= Björk Orkestral =

2021–23 concert tour by Björk

- Tour by Björk
- Promotional poster from the Reykjavik shows
- Associated album: Various
- Start date: 11 October 2021
- End date: 23 April 2023
- No. of shows: 11 in Europe; 4 in North America; 3 in South America; 2 in Asia; 20 total

Björk concert chronology
- Cornucopia (2019–23); Björk Orkestral (2021–23)

Björk Orkestral was an "unplugged" concert series by Icelandic musician Björk. Originally announced for the summer of 2020, all concert dates were delayed due to the COVID-19 pandemic. A four-part concert series was later announced for August 2020 at the Harpa concert hall in Reykjavík, then rescheduled to October and November 2021 due to new restrictions against the pandemic by the Icelandic government. Each date featured different musicians, instrumentation and set lists and all four concerts were live streamed to raise money for Kvennaathvarfið, a women's shelter in Reykjavík. Over 100 Icelandic musicians joined Björk on stage across the four matinee performances, which were some of the first live performances with an audience by a major international singer since COVID-19 crippled the live music industry.

After the shows in Iceland, Björk embarked on a global tour of acoustic concerts, which saw her headline music festivals such as Bluedot Festival and Primavera Sound.

== Background and concept ==
After touring her "theatrical" stage production, Cornucopia, in 2019, Björk announced a new concert series called Björk Orkestral (originally spelled Björk Orchestral) in February 2020. The original dates were scheduled for summer 2020 in France, England, Russia, Finland and Germany, and the tour was billed as acoustic, strings-only shows in celebration of Björk's "orchestral arrangements of works so far". Shortly after these dates were announced, however, the coronavirus pandemic put a crippling halt on live concerts and Björk had to postpone the show until summer 2022.

Measures the Icelandic government took to contain the virus proved to be one of the most effective throughout the world, and by mid-May 2020 the country had slowed the spread of the coronavirus to two new cases a week, effectively eradicating COVID-19 from its shores.

Recognizing the unique position Iceland was in but also the devastating global economic impact COVID-19 left in its wake, along with the world-wide Black Lives Matter protests in response to the police murder of George Floyd in the United States, Björk decided it was the right time to bring her orchestral concerts to live audiences in her home country. "There are many musicians out of work right now... Many of them live by playing concerts because they no longer earn revenue from record sales." She credits her father's role in Iceland unions for her desire to fight for musician's wages. The proceeds from the concerts went to Kvennaathvarfið, a women's shelter dedicated to refugees in Iceland, though Björk revealed that due to the isolation experienced during lock down, Icelandic women in general are in need of Kvennaathvarfið's services. In addition to concert ticket sales, each matinee performances was followed by an evening of food and beverages with the proceeds also going to Kvennaathvarfið. In addition to the funds raised in Iceland, the concerts were live streamed throughout the world to raise money for charity with donations being sent to non-profit organizations in each country the shows are streamed in.

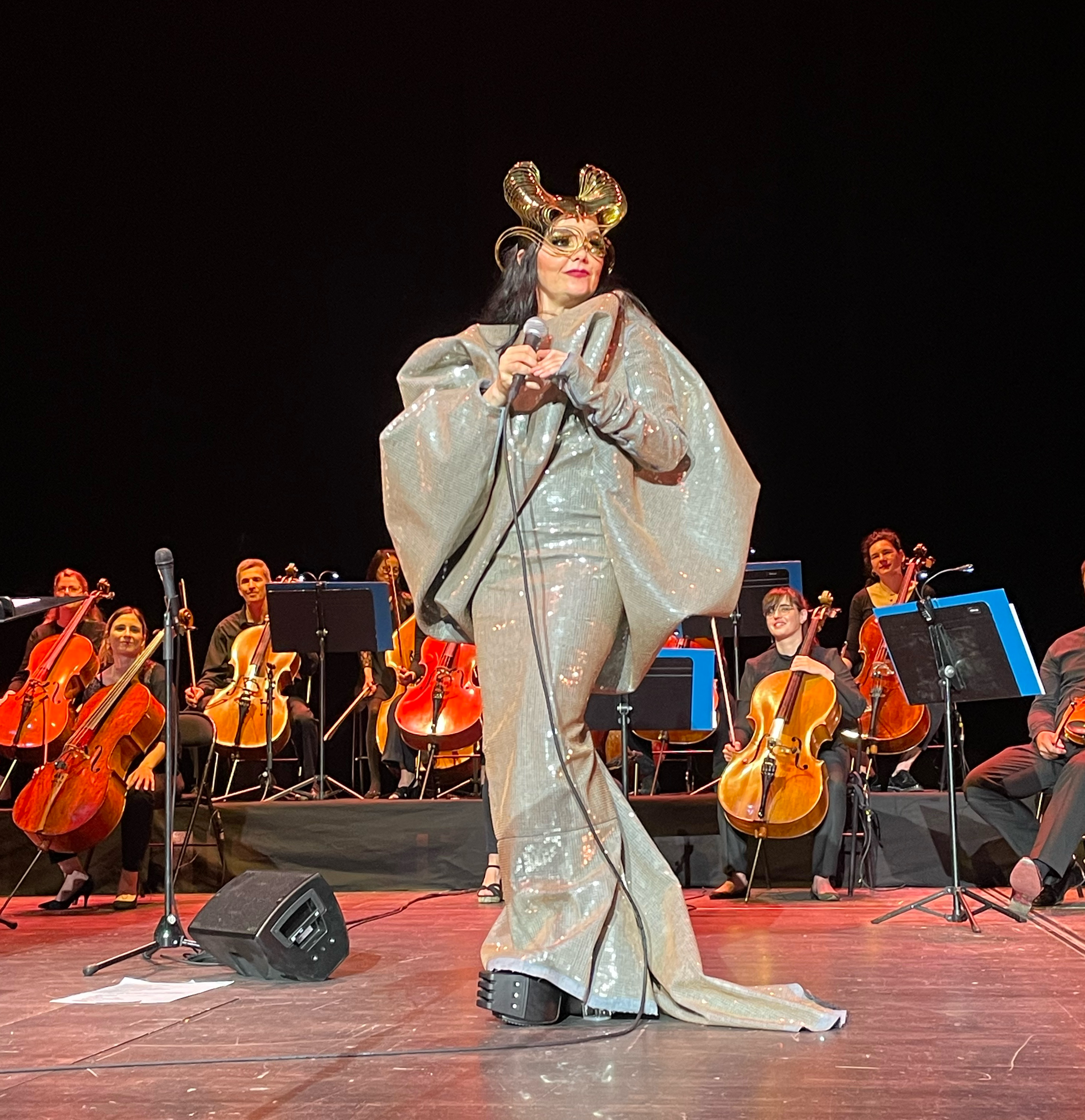
Björk at La Seine Musicale in Paris on 21 June 2022, for the second leg of the European tour.

As for the concerts themselves, Björk has wanted to hold these acoustic-only shows since publishing her first collection of sheet music in 2017. 34 Scores for Piano, Organ, Harpsichord and Celeste features acoustic arrangements created in collaboration with her longtime accompanist Jónas Sen which covers her entire discography. Björk Orkestral saw Björk reunite with over 100 Icelandic musicians, Sen included, that have contributed to her studio albums and live concerts. Initially only three concerts were announced, but on 13 July 2020 a fourth show was added to the schedule. Each concert featured a different set of musicians and instruments and a unique set list.The 11 October 2021 show featured the strings section of the Icelandic Symphony Orchestra, conducted by Viktor Orri Árnason, in addition to the harpist Katie Buckley. Árnason replaces Bjarni Frimann Bjarnason who was originally announced as conductor. The performance drew the bulk of its material from Björk's albums, Post (1995) and Vespertine (2001) plus the 2000 soundtrack album Selmasongs.

The 24 October 2021 show featured the 50-person Hamrahlíð Choir conducted by Þorgerður Ingólfsdóttir and musician Bergur Þórisson on organ and featured songs primarily from Björk's album Medúlla (2004). Both The Hamrahlíð Choir and Þórisson featured on the album Utopia and performed on the New York and EU dates of the Cornucopia tour.

The 31 October 2021 show featured the brass section of the Icelandic Symphony Orchestra in addition to the flute septet Viibra. The members of Viibra played the flutes on Björk's 2017 album Utopia and officially formed as a group to tour with Björk throughout the Utopia and Cornucopia tours. In addition to brass and flutes, the night saw American-born harpist Katie Buckley return in addition to pianist and long-time collaborator Jónas Sen. Material was drawn from the albums Vespertine, Volta (2007) and Utopia.

These concerts were held in collaboration with Iceland Airwaves, RÚV, Harpa, Promote Iceland, and Icelandair. Recordings of performances at Harpa in 2021 were compiled in the live album Björk Orkestral With the Hamrahlíð Choir, released in May 2026.

== Songs performed ==
During each concert in Iceland, Björk performed a different set of songs to fit the different musicians invited to perform with her.

11 October 2021 show
1. "Stonemilker"
2. "Aurora"
3. "I've Seen It All"
4. "Sun in My Mouth"
5. "You've Been Flirting Again"
6. "Isobel"
7. "Hyperballad"
8. "Harm of Will"
9. "Bachelorette"
10. "Unison"
11. "Generous Palmstroke"
24 October 2021 show
1. "Show Me Forgiveness"
2. "Pleasure Is All Mine"
3. "Hidden Place"
4. "Cosmogony"
5. "Sonnets/Unrealities XI"
6. "Unravel"
7. "Vertabræ by Vertabræ"
8. "Oceania"
9. "Who Is It"
10. "Mouth's Cradle"
11. "Where Is the Line"
12. "Human Behaviour"
13. "New World"
31 October 2021 show
1. "Tabula Rasa"
2. "Utopia"
3. "The Gate"
4. "Courtship"
5. "Pagan Poetry"
6. "Losss"
7. "Sue Me"
8. "Generous Palmstroke"
9. "Aeroplane"
10. "Wanderlust"
11. "Mutual Core"
12. "The Anchor Song"
15 November 2021 show
1. "Jóga"
2. "Come to Me"
3. "Hunter"
4. "Lionsong"
5. "History of Touches"
6. "Black Lake"
7. "Mouth Mantra"
8. "5 Years"
9. "Quicksand"
10. "Pluto"
11. "Notget"

For the touring shows, Björk performs with a 22 piece string orchestra, combining songs from the 4 original Reykjavík shows.

Touring set list

This set list is representative of the show on 24 July 2022, in Cheshire.

1. "Stonemilker"
2. "Aurora"
3. "Come to Me"
4. "Lionsong"
5. "I've Seen It All"
6. "History of Touches"
7. "Black Lake"
8. "Hunter"
9. "You've Been Flirting Again"
10. "Isobel"
11. "Bachelorette"
12. "Jóga"
13. "Quicksand"
14. "Hyperballad"

Encore

15. "Overture"
16. "Pluto"
- During the first show in Miami, "5 Years", "Mouth Mantra" and "Notget" were performed instead of "You've Been Flirting Again", "Hyperballad" and "Overture".
- Starting from the show in Bergen, "Black Lake" and "Bachelorette" are not performed.
- After the release of Fossora, "History of Touches" was replaced by "Ovule" during the show in São Paulo and by "Freefall" for subsequent dates.
- "Notget" was added back to the setlist after "Quicksand" starting from the show in Buenos Aires.

== Tour dates ==
List of 2021 concerts
Date (2021)	City	Country	Venue	Players	Conductor
11 October (Note: The concert of 11 October 2021, in Reykjavík was previously scheduled for 15 August 2020, 28 September 2020, 18 April 2021, and 29 August 2021.)	Reykjavík	Iceland	Harpa	Iceland Symphony Orchestra, Katie Buckley (harp)	Viktor Orri Árnason
24 October (Note: The concert of 24 October 2021, in Reykjavík was previously scheduled for 9 August 2020, 19 September 2020, 25 April 2021, and 5 September 2021.)	Reykjavík	Iceland	Harpa	Hamrahlíð Choir, Bergur Þórisson (electronics, organ) Bjarni Frímann Bjarnason (piano, organ, accordion)	Þorgerður Ingólfsdóttir
31 October (Note: The concert of 31 October 2021, in Reykjavík was previously scheduled for 23 August 2020, 13 September 2020, 2 May 2021, and 12 September 2021.)	Reykjavík	Iceland	Harpa	Iceland Symphony Orchestra (brass), Viibra (flute septet), Katie Buckley (harp), Bergur Þórisson (electronics)	Björg Brjánsdóttir
15 November (Note: The concert of 15 November 2021, in Reykjavík was previously scheduled for 29 August 2020, 9 May 2021, and 19 September 2021.)	Reykjavík	Iceland	Harpa	Iceland Symphony Orchestra	Viktor Orri Árnason

List of 2022 concerts
Date (2022)	City	Country	Venue	Players	Conductor
13 February	Miami	United States	Adrienne Arsht Center for the Performing Arts	The Aym Ensemble	Bjarni Frímann Bjarnason
16 February	Miami	United States	Adrienne Arsht Center for the Performing Arts	The Aym Ensemble	Bjarni Frímann Bjarnason
17 June (Note: The concert of 17 June 2022, in Berlin was previously scheduled for 9 July 2020, and 18 June 2021.)	Berlin	Germany	Waldbühne Open Air	Berlin Radio Symphony Orchestra	Bjarni Frímann Bjarnason
21 June (Note: The concert of 21 June 2022, in Paris was previously scheduled for 17 July 2020, and 25 June 2021.)	Paris	France	La Seine Musicale	Pasdeloup Orchestra	Bjarni Frímann Bjarnason
24 June (Note: The concert of 24 June 2022, in Paris was previously scheduled for 20 July 2020, and 28 June 2021.)	Paris	France	La Seine Musicale	Pasdeloup Orchestra	Bjarni Frímann Bjarnason
3 July	Montreux (Note: The concert in Montreux was part of the Montreux Jazz Festival.)	Switzerland	Montreux Music & Convention Centre	Sinfonietta de Lausanne	Bjarni Frímann Bjarnason
24 July (Note: The concert of 24 July 2022, in Cheshire was previously scheduled for 26 July 2020, and 25 July 2021.)	Cheshire (Note: The concert in Cheshire was part of the Bluedot Festival.)	England	Jodrell Bank Observatory	The Hallé	Bjarni Frímann Bjarnason
30 July	Trondheim (Note: The concert in Trondheim was part of Olavsfestdagene.)	Norway	Kristiansten Fortress	Trondheim Soloists	Bjarni Frímann Bjarnason
3 August	Bergen	Norway	Bergenhus Festningen	Trondheim Soloists	Bjarni Frímann Bjarnason
5 November	São Paulo (Note: The concert in São Paulo was part of Primavera Sound São Paulo.)	Brazil	Anhembi Convention Center	Fundação Bachiana	Bjarni Frímann Bjarnason
9 November	Buenos Aires (Note: The concert in Buenos Aires was part of the Primavera Sound Buenos Aires.)	Argentina	Costanera Sur	Orquesta Teatro Colón	Bjarni Frímann Bjarnason
13 November	Santiago (Note: The concert in Santiago was part of the Primavera Sound Santiago de Chile.)	Chile	Parque Bicentenario de Cerrillos	Fundación de Orquestas Juveniles e Infantiles de Chile	Bjarni Frímann Bjarnason

List of 2023 concerts
Date (2023)	City	Country	Venue	Players	Conductor
20 March	Tokyo	Japan	Tokyo Garden Theatre	Muroya Strings	Bjarni Frímann Bjarnason
25 March	Kobe	Japan	World Memorial Hall	Muroya Strings	Bjarni Frímann Bjarnason
16 April	Indio (Note: The concerts in Indio were part of the Coachella Festival.)	United States	Empire Polo Club	Hollywood String Ensemble	Bjarni Frímann Bjarnason
23 April	Indio	United States	Empire Polo Club	Hollywood String Ensemble	Bjarni Frímann Bjarnason

Festival performances

Cancelled shows

8 June 2022 (Note: The concert of 8 June 2022, in Moscow was previously scheduled for 2 July 2020, and 14 June 2021.)	Moscow, Russia	Crocus City Hall	Russo-Ukrainian War
12 June 2022 (Note: The concert of 12 June 2022, in Helsinki was previously scheduled for 6 July 2020, and 10 June 2021.)	Helsinki, Finland	Hartwall Arena	Russo-Ukrainian War (Hartwall Arena is Russian-owned)

Reschedulations
The tour has been marred by repeated shows' rescheduling due to the ongoing COVID-19 pandemic.
