= Vulnicura Strings =

Vulnicura Strings (The Acoustic Versions – Strings, Voice and Viola Organista Only)

Remix album by Björk
- Released: 6 November 2015
- Genres: Acoustic; chamber
- Length: 64:00
- Label: One Little Indian
- Producer: Björk

Björk chronology
Vulnicura (2015)	Vulnicura Strings (The Acoustic Versions – Strings, Voice and Viola Organista Only) (2015)	Vulnicura Live (2015)

Vulnicura Strings (The Acoustic Versions – Strings, Voice and Viola Organista Only), or simply Vulnicura Strings, is an acoustic album released by Icelandic singer-songwriter Björk as a companion to her 2015 album, Vulnicura. Vulnicura Strings has been described as a more uncompromising and intimate take on Björk's breakup album, featuring strings-only versions of the Vulnicura tracks, with the omission of "History of Touches". Also the version of "Family" omits the vocals.

== Background and concept ==
On 20 January 2015, Björk rush-released Vulnicura, her eighth studio album, after the album leaked online just days after being announced. Vulnicura was a critical success, with praise centering on Björk's strong and intimate lyrics, her powerful string arrangements, and the beats created by Björk and her co-producers Arca and The Haxan Cloak.

On 5 October 2015, Vulnicura Strings was officially announced after some online shops listed the item with few details other than the name. Björk described the genesis of the project on her official Facebook page: "While I was working on Vulnicura, it became one of the most magical thing(s) both musically and spiritually to unite the electronics and the acoustic instruments in an almost romantic way: to prove they can coexist!!... But while working on it I felt somehow for the first time, this was an album that could take another version: a reveal, to simply have the acoustics stand on their own for the folks who wanna indulge even further into the wooden timeless side of this music. With no techno."

She elaborated elsewhere, "For me, strings stand for the nerves of the human bodies. The voice and wind instruments are the lungs. Beats are for dancing and your heart pumping, but when you stroke stringed instruments, it's like your nerves vibrating. It's why we sympathise so easily with strings, I think, especially when you're going through painful stuff. You just want to grab a clip-on mic and get that... 'urrrrrrrrr'. It creates this angsty, almost uncomfortable sound – the sound of really raw emotion."

For the stripped-down versions of the Vulnicura songs, Björk kept the vocal takes of the original studio album but decided to use alternate takes of the acoustic instruments recorded during the original recording sessions, stating, "I dug out the more close-up pick up miked versions, other sonic point-of-views...". The album includes additional string solos by Una Sveinbjarnardóttir, who was a part of the Icelandic String Octet that joined Björk on stage for her 1998 Homogenic tour.

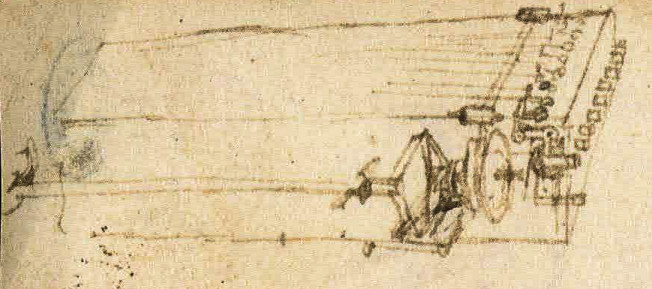
Viola organista (Codex Atlanticus, 1488–1489)

In addition, several songs feature the Viola organista, a unique instrument designed by Leonardo da Vinci but built for the first time centuries later by Polish musician Sławomir Zubrzycki. Björk described how the instrument works: "...(it) uses a friction belt to vibrate individual strings (similar to a violin), with the strings selected by pressing keys on the keyboard (similar to an organ)." Björk first contacted Zubrzycki by email in 2013 after discovering him on YouTube. She stated, "...like everyone else (I) was just completely blown away. Obviously I wanted to run to Poland, like, NOW, and just record whatever. But I've learned over the years that it's good to not be too impatient." Björk's commitment to her Biophilia tour, followed immediately by composing and recording duties on Vulnicura, delayed their collaboration until mid-2015, when Björk contacted Zubrzycki again asking him to take part in this new version of Vulnicura.

But they did not meet in person. Björk simply sent him the score. "He's an incredibly talented musician," Björk revealed, "and he has more love for that instrument than the rest of us put together. It was clear that the best thing was just to pass it over to him." Zubrzycki recorded his parts in Kraków, Poland and sent the recordings to London. Days later, Björk sent the musician flowers as a thank you.

In addition to appearing on the tracks "Atom Dance", "Notget" and "Family", the Viola Organista performs a solo instrumental of "Black Lake", Vulnicura's 10-minute-long centerpiece. Björk described why that song and instrument went well together: "I'm glad I waited until after we'd played the album live to record it. After some time had passed, it became obvious that "Black Lake" in particular was just this weird ghost of a song. It doesn't matter what mood you're in, what concert hall you're in: (performing this song was) always like going back to the Middle Ages. So I thought, OK, this is a little ancient song that would probably have a good relationship with the Viola Organista."

In describing why she returned to writing for strings after years of experimental instruments and orchestrations, she offered, "It was kind of perfect timing – I mean, I'd given strings a 12 year break. When I came back to them, I felt a lot more confident, and arranging and transcribing felt much more natural. It's the first time I've really done all the arrangements myself: coming up with the melodies, but also distributing the parts and printing out the scores." She said doing Medúlla, an all-vocal album, helped develop her composing skills, adding, "...I did the choir arrangements totally myself. Maybe it was easier for me, because I know the instrument much better – I've been singing since I was a kid. During Medúlla I sat with the choir working out the music, the harmonies, the Italian – you know, forte, piano, sforzando, that stuff."

Vulnicura Strings was mixed by Björk and Chris Elms and stands as Björk's first companion project to one of her studio albums that wasn't a traditional remix album or a collection of live recordings. It is also her first completely acoustic studio effort. The cover artwork features a live photo by Brooklyn-based photographer Santiago Felipe and a dress by Geoffrey Mac.

Just like the original release of Vulnicura, Vulnicura Strings leaked online in inferior mono sound mere days after being announced. Unlike the original album, however, Vulnicura Strings was not rush-released digitally to head off potential losses in sales. The album was released on 6 November 2015 on CD and digitally, to be followed a month later by the vinyl edition on 4 December, though North America did not see a vinyl release until 8 January 2016.

== Critical reception ==
Professional ratings
Aggregate scores
Source	Rating
AnyDecentMusic?	7.5/10
Metacritic	80/100
Review scores
Source	Rating
The Line of Best Fit	9/10
musicOMH	4/5 stars
Pitchfork	6.8/10
Record Collector	5/5 stars

Vulnicura Strings received general acclaim from music critics. At Metacritic, which assigns a normalised rating out of 100 to reviews from mainstream critics, the album received an average score of 80, which indicates "generally favorable reviews", based on six reviews.

== Live performances ==
On 19 July 2016, Björk announced her first live show since abruptly ending the Vulnicura tour in 2015, a special performance at London's historic Royal Albert Hall on 21 September 2016 to coincide with the London premiere of her VR show Björk Digital. It was her first show in London in three years but no other details were given. A month later on 15 August 2016, after instantly selling out the Royal Albert Hall, Björk announced a second London show for 24 September, this time at the Eventim Apollo in Hammersmith.

On 21 September 2016 Björk took to the Royal Albert Hall stage, performing a set of strings-only songs, starting with the first six songs from Vulnicura and then debuting strings-only interpretations of many of her most popular songs including “Pagan Poetry” and “Pluto”. Over two-dozen members of the Aurora Orchestra and conductor Andrew Gourlay joined her on stage in a performance that The Guardian described as “startlingly, punishingly direct.” Of the Vulnicura songs "History of Touches" saw the greatest reinvention in its acoustic form, having been omitted from Vulnicura Strings entirely: the electronic synths of the original album version were replaced with high-pitched strings.

On 26 September 2016, the organizers of the 2016 Iceland Airwaves music festival announced Björk would perform two shows at the Harpa concert hall. These were held on 5 and 8 November 2016 and coincided with the debut of Björk Digital in her native Iceland. The previous year Björk cancelled two shows at Iceland Airwaves due to vocal issues, thus these 2016 performances were her live debut of Vulnicura in her homeland.

On 9 January 2017, it was announced that Björk would perform an exclusive show in Mexico City at the Auditorio Nacional on 29 March 2017. It was her first time performing in Mexico City and her third concert in Mexico overall. The concert followed the acoustic format set by her 2016 shows to promote Björk Digital which played in Mexico City at the same time. A second appearance in Mexico was confirmed on 16 January when it was announced that Björk would headline Toluca's Ceremonia Festival on 1 April 2017 where Arca, the electronic co-producer of Vulnicura, joined her for a strings and beats-type show similar to her 2015 Vulnicura tour.

On 3 March 2017, Björk and the LA Philharmonic Association announced the west coast debut of Björk Digital as well as a special concert at the Walt Disney Concert Hall which was held on 30 May. Bjarni Frímann Bjarnason served as guest conductor for the show that capped off the L.A. Phil's spring 2017 Reykjavík Festival. Her debut performance at the venue sold out in minutes, and during the show Björk announced that it would be her final Vulnicura concert, ending her 7-month tour of the Vulnicura Strings album.

== Track listing ==
All tracks written by Björk, except where noted.

No.	Title	Writer(s)	Length
1.	"Mouth Mantra"		6:10
2.	"Lionsong"		6:23
3.	"Black Lake"		10:10
4.	"Atom Dance" (featuring Anohni)	lyrics: Björk, Oddný Eir	7:44
5.	"Stonemilker"		6:50
6.	"Quicksand"	music: Björk, Spaces	4:03
7.	"Notget"	music: Björk, Arca	4:40
8.	"Family"	music: Björk, Arca	7:00
9.	"Black Lake" (Viola Organista Version)		11:00
Total length:			64:00

Japanese and Argentinian editions
No.	Title	Length
9.	"Mouth Mantra" (The Haxan Cloak Mix)	6:30
10.	"Black Lake" (Bloom Remix)	3:11
Total length:		73:41

Vinyl edition
No.	Title	Length
1.	"Lionsong"	6:23
2.	"Black Lake"	10:14
3.	"Mouth Mantra"	6:13
4.	"Atom Dance"	7:49
5.	"Stonemilker"	6:54
6.	"Family"	7:00
7.	"Notget"	4:54
8.	"Quicksand"	4:15
Total length:		53:01

Notes

- The digital release features "Black Lake (Viola Organista Version)" as a bonus track while the CD edition features it as a hidden track tagged onto the end of the final track, "Family".

== Charts ==
Chart (2015-2016)	Position
UK Independent Albums (OCC)	37
US Classical Albums	9
US Classical Crossover Albums	8
