= Vulnicura =

2015 studio album by Björk

Studio album by Björk
- Released: 20 January 2015
- Recorded: 2012–2014
- Genres: Electronic; avant-garde; ambient
- Length: 58:40
- Label: One Little Indian
- Producers: Björk; Arca; The Haxan Cloak

Björk chronology
Biophilia Live (2014)	Vulnicura (2015)	Vulnicura Strings (2015)

Deluxe edition cover

Vulnicura is the eighth (Note: Vulnicura is officially considered to be her eighth album. However, it is considered her ninth album by sources that include her self-titled 1977 album in this number. It can be also her tenth album, counting in her 1990 jazz output Gling-Gló.) studio album by Icelandic musician and singer Björk. It was produced by Björk, Arca and The Haxan Cloak, and released on 20 January 2015 by One Little Indian Records. Björk said the album expresses her feelings before and after her breakup with American contemporary artist Matthew Barney and the healing process.

Vulnicura was originally scheduled for release in March 2015, in conjunction with the Björk: Archives book and an exhibition about Björk's career at the Museum of Modern Art in New York City; following an internet leak, it was released digitally two months early. No singles were released to promote the album but a series of innovative music videos were created, culminating in the 360-degree virtual reality exhibit Björk Digital. Vulnicura received widespread acclaim from critics, with many considering it one of her most honest and personal albums as well as her best output in a decade. It peaked at number 20 on the US Billboard 200 and received a nomination for Best Alternative Music Album at the 58th Grammy Awards.

The companion album Vulnicura Strings was released on 6 November 2015. It features strings-only interpretations of the Vulnicura tracks and utilises an instrument designed by Leonardo da Vinci called the viola organista. By October 2015, the album had sold 250,000 copies worldwide.

== Background and recording ==
After completing the tour for her previous project Biophilia (2011), which featured a series of apps and instruments created especially for the live show, Björk expressed interest in using the same instruments for her next project. She told The Independent: "I happen to know some of the best app programmers in the world, and I have the instruments I can just plug straight into the iPad and play whatever I have. So it seems kind of natural to work on an album where I don't have three years of prepping. But at the same time, it is a kind of extreme project."

In May 2013, Björk told the San Francisco Bay Guardian that she was in the early stages of a new album. In the same month, she told the San Francisco Chronicle she had "enough songs that I'm ready to see the next thing".

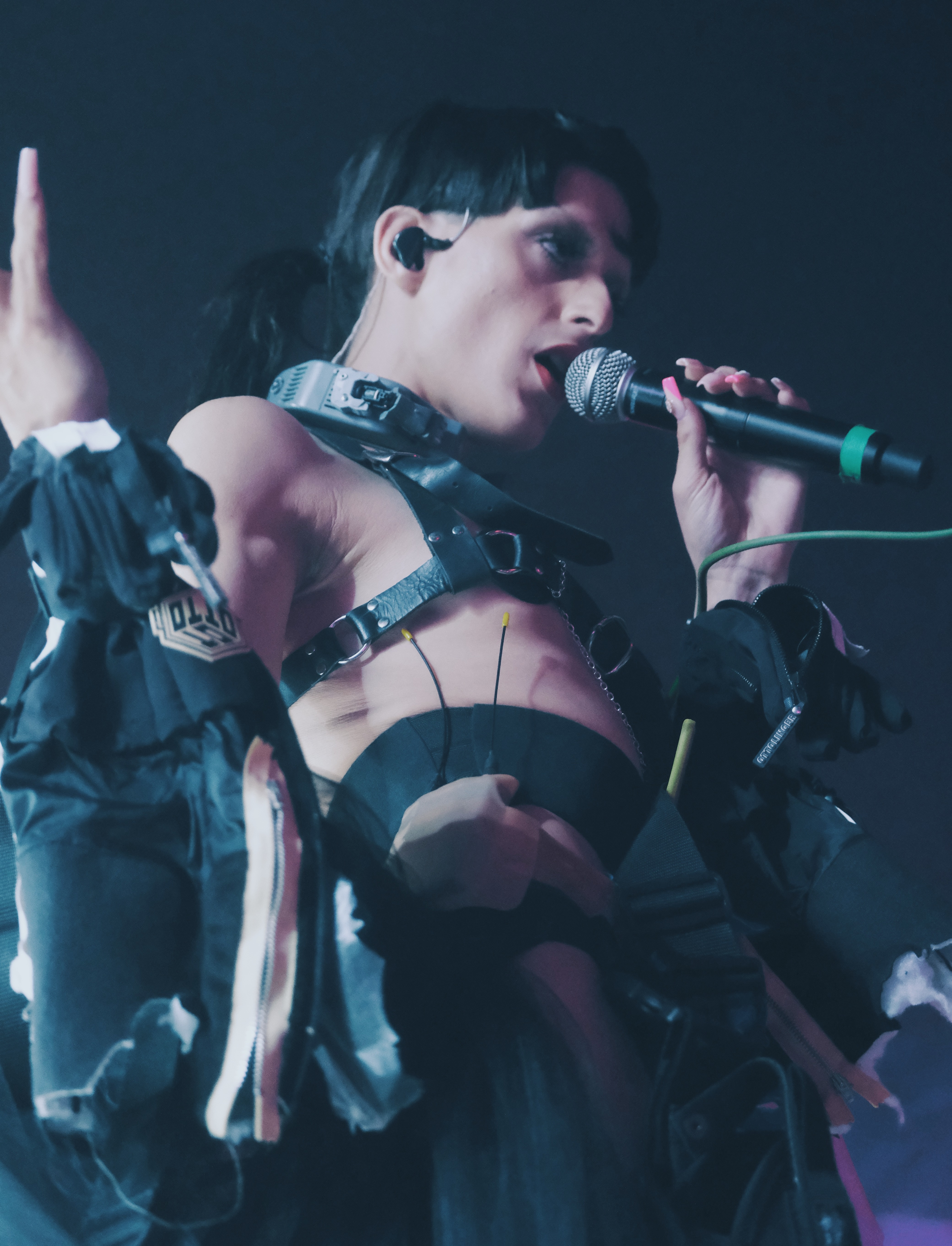
Venezuelan artist Arca co-produced the album with Björk.

Venezuelan producer Arca co-produced Vulnicura. Björk approached Arca after her manager sent her Arca's mixtape &&&&& (2013); Arca then DJ'ed at Björk's Biophilia tour afterparty and the two started working together afterwards. Björk was not aware of Arca's work with Kanye West and FKA Twigs (on Yeezus and EP2, 2013) but she soon appreciated it along with Arca's knowledge of her own discography. Arca described working with Björk, whom she has called a musical inspiration, as "healing", and said: "The way she exists as a human is a big influence on the way I exist as a human."

On 7 October 2014, Björk announced on her Facebook page that she would not attend the British premiere of her concert film Björk: Biophilia Live at the BFI London Film Festival because she was too busy working on the album, and confirmed a 2015 release date. British musician and producer The Haxan Cloak announced on Twitter on 6 January 2015 that he had worked on the album, calling the collaboration "an honour".

On 14 January 2015, Björk posted a handwritten note on her Facebook page announcing the album's title, Vulnicura, its track list and a March 2015 release date. Vulnicura means "Cure for Wounds" (Vulnus + Cura) in Latin, and Björk described it as "a more traditional album than Biophilia for what concerns songwriting. It's about what may come to a person at the end of a relationship. It talks about the dialogues we may have in our heads and in our hearts, the healing processes."

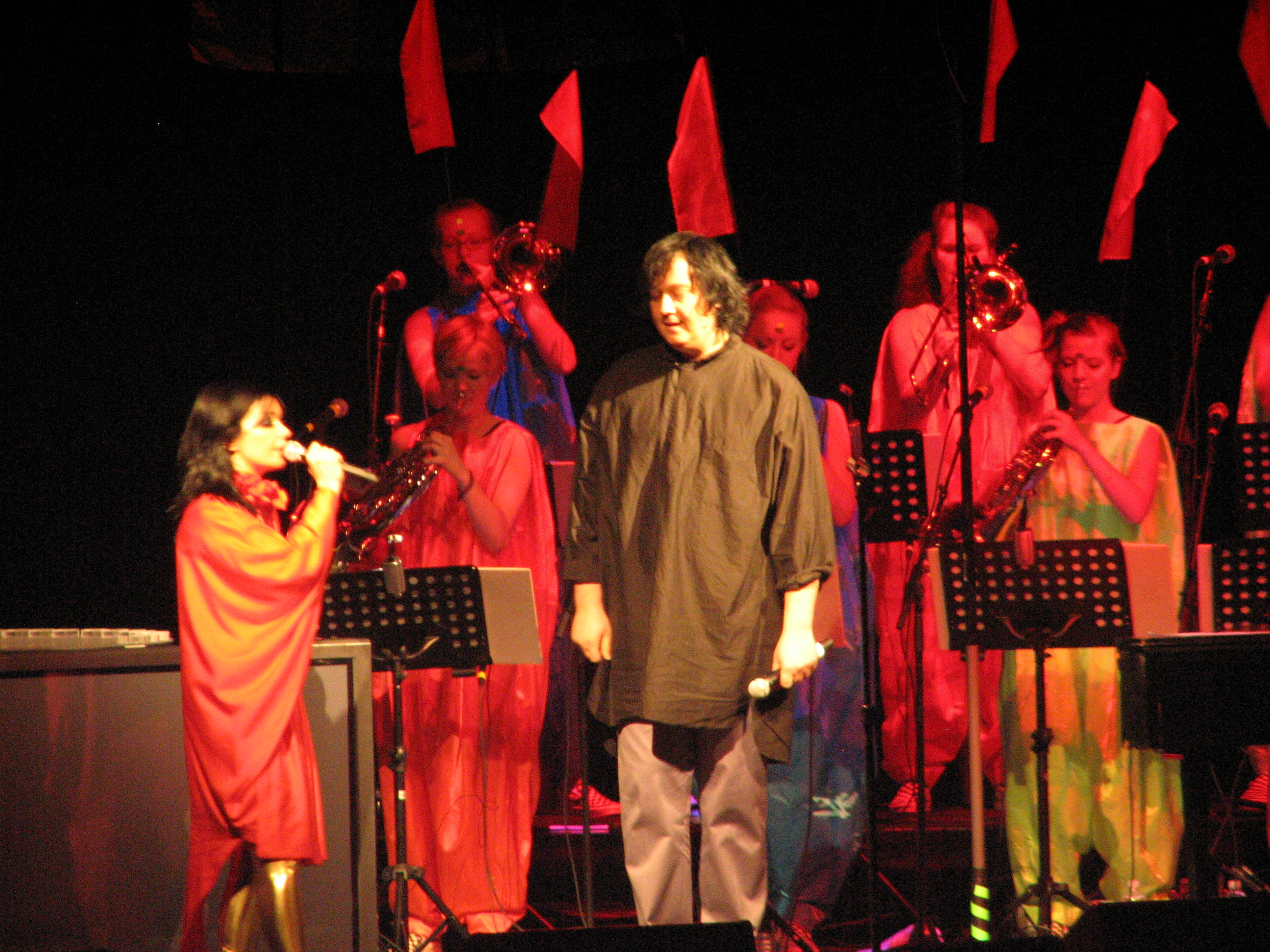
Björk performing with Anohni (right), who performs guest vocals on "Atom Dance".

The music on Vulnicura has been described by critics as incorporating electronic, avant-garde, and ambient music.

The album is primarily composed of string arrangements and electronic beats, as a return to the sound Björk pursued on her 1997 album Homogenic. In an interview with Pitchfork, Björk exposed how working on string arrangements served as a way to keep her mind busy after her breakup: "The only way I could deal with that was to start writing for strings; I decided to become a violin nerd and arrange everything for 15 strings and take a step further."

The involvement of Arca came in late stages of the writing process, which Björk described as "such a contrast, the most fun music-making I've ever had, with the most tragic subject matter [...] I just sat next to [Arca] for weeks, and we did the whole album. It's the quickest I've ever worked [...] It's one of those crazy things in life where people from opposite ends meet, and you've got so much to teach each other."

== Release and artwork ==
On 18 January 2015, just days after being publicly announced, and two months ahead of its scheduled release, a supposed full version of the album leaked online. At the time, no official release date or cover art was confirmed, nor was Anohni's featured participation in "Atom Dance". The illegal leak was compared to the one that happened to Madonna and her album Rebel Heart, whose several songs in their demo form were leaked online during late 2014.

The album's release date was pushed up to 20 January, becoming available as a digital download.

The artwork was designed by longtime collaborators M/M (Paris). The digital cover was photographed by also longtime collaborators Inez and Vinoodh: "She said she wanted to have a wound on her body, on her heart area, in an abstract way [...] Imagine you're Mata Hari, a seductress, but you're wounded, and there is an incredibly alluring softness around you." On the cover, Björk wears a black latex suit, a wound on her chest and a headpiece made of quills, which she already wore during the last stages of her Biophilia tour. Björk clarified that, during the time in between the two albums, the Vulnicura cover character started surfacing. The main color of the artwork is yellow, since Björk links this color to the "healing" process. The photo shoot was filmed and transformed into a music video to accompany the album track "Lionsong".

For the physical release, a second cover art was made by Andrew Thomas Huang. In the deluxe edition, the artwork comes in the shape of an acetate slipcase. This artwork was also transformed into a short music video for the track "Family".

To coincide with all of Björk's previous albums being reissued on limited edition colored vinyl for the MoMA retrospective, Vulnicura was later issued in a limited run of double neon yellow LPs.

== Promotion ==
=== Media coverage ===
Being the follow-up to Biophilia after more than three years, Vulnicura's release was highly anticipated. Online music publications like Music Times, Time Out, FasterLouder, Gigwise, Fact, Dazed Digital, Pitchfork and Billboard included it in their list of the most anticipated albums of 2015, with Diffuser and Stereogum ranking it as the seventh and tenth most anticipated album of 2015, respectively. DIY listed the upcoming release as one of the eleven reasons to get excited about 2015, while NME included Björk in their list of 40 most anticipated comebacks for 2015.

Although not initially intended, the album was included in the Björk retrospective exhibition at the Museum of Modern Art (MoMA). Music videos for the tracks "Lionsong" and "Black Lake" were premiered there. The video for "Stonemilker" premiered at MoMA PS1 on 22 March.

On 17 December 2015, Björk appeared on the podcast Song Exploder (Episode 60) where she detailed the creation of Vulnicura's opening track, "Stonemilker". "It's about someone who's trying to get emotions out of another person," she said. "I think it's equally hard for all of us and we're just all doing our best but I think there's also a choice. Do you want to try and then maybe fail half of the time and then succeed half of the time or whatever your odds are? Or is it your choice to not even try?" On the creation of the song: "I was walking on a beach, and I was kind of walking back and forth and the lyrics kind of came along kind of without me really editing them.... (They're) probably the most obvious lyrics I've ever written. I actually wrote a whole other lyric to this song, which was really maybe a bit too clever for its own good but something in me said, 'No, don't touch it. It has to be, like, almost clumsy or naive.' That's sort of the strength and weakness of the song at the same time." When talking about the string arrangements for "Stonemilker", Björk said, "For me it was very important... that the strings were kind of cyclical; this chord cycle that kind of gives you this feeling it can go on and on in circles and gives you this feeling of equilibrium. Like the person who's singing this song is showing some sort of harmony to someone as an example... I had 30 players, and then I would do 2 sets of arrangements so basically there are, in theory, 60 because it needed that sort of panoramic feeling to have that sort of smooth, cream-like perfection." On her collaboration with beat maker and co-producer Arca, "... it was very obvious that song was very simple so we didn't really need a crazy beat thing going on. It just had to be really supportive of the song, and almost acoustic like it's a symphony orchestra playing and the beat would come from the kettledrum or something. You know? Like a very soft support which Alejandra (Arca) provided."

=== Music videos ===
The first video produced for Vulnicura was "Black Lake", directed by Andrew Thomas Huang who previously collaborated with Björk on Biophilia's "Mutual Core" video in 2012. It was announced that the video would debut at MoMA's Björk retrospective in March 2015 in an elaborate video installation. A trailer for the retrospective premiered on the MoMA's YouTube channel on 13 February 2015. The trailer is a single shot of a nude Björk lying on a black dirt field with her body literally split in half, while the official video has her walking through a black Icelandic cave in an original Iris Van Herpen dress. In explaining the evolution of the "Black Lake" video project, Björk said, "I think me and Andrew kept wanting the song to be rawer and rawer and more and more without special effects: to go totally "Ingmar Bergman" on it. So the "book cover" ended up being a book cover....." While the MoMA "Black Lake" installation consisted of 2 screens showcasing complementary edits of the 10-minute video, the final music video version, which debuted on Dazed Digital on 10 June 2015, is a composite of both videos. The installation also comprises the special room where the video is projected, which has speakers all over its walls, reproducing a surrounding version of the song mixed by The Haxan Cloak, who co-produced the Vulnicura track "Family".

To celebrate the opening of the MoMA show and the upcoming physical release of the album, Björk announced on Facebook the "Stonemilker" 360-degree virtual reality music video. It utilized the Oculus Rift, a VR head-mounted display, and featured her on the same Icelandic beach where she originally wrote the song. The video premiered at MoMA's sister location, the MoMA PS1 on 22 March and was briefly made available to customers of the record shop Rough Trade in London and Brooklyn, NY who purchased the physical album. The VR head-set version of the video featured a strings only mix of the song. Björk explained, "I had recorded the strings with a clip-on mike on each instrument. We have made a different mix where we have fanned this in an intimate circle around the listener." It was later released as a 360-degree YouTube video on 6 June 2015 featuring the original album mix.

Also, at the Cinema room of the MoMA retrospective, as part of Björk's videography, the "Lionsong" video was premiered by surprise. The video, directed by the Dutch creative duo Inez & Vinoodh, directors of Björk's "Hidden Place" and "Moon" videos, was later made available to the general public through Noisey. "Lionsong" was conceived of spontaneously during the Vulnicura album cover photo shoot.

On 16 March 2015, the day of Vulnicura's physical release, a "moving album cover" video premiered online featuring the CGI character of the deluxe edition artwork created by Huang. Björk conceived of the video, which is set to a condensed edit of the track "Family", as the completion of the "Black Lake" video. Huang explained, "She came back to me because she (felt) that (what was shown in Black Lake) was only 50% of that character, and that there's another 50% of this persona that she's been in for this past year-and-a-half to two years, that is much more positive and resolved in itself."

In December 2015, the music video for "Mouth Mantra" – directed by Arca's longtime collaborator Jesse Kanda – was revealed. Much of the video takes place inside Björk's mouth with the help of hi-tech mouth models and a special camera. And, like "Stonemilker", the video will soon be made available for 360-degree viewing.

On 4 June 2016, the virtual reality video for the song "Notget" debuted at the Carriageworks Festival in Sydney, Australia for the premiere of the VR exhibition Björk Digital. As Björk Digital traveled the world, new videos would debut, such as "Quicksand" in October 2016 at Montreal and a full VR version of "Family" in November 2016 in Reykjavik.

On 3 April 2017, the 2D version of the VR video for "Notget" debuted on YouTube. "Quicksand" and the full version of "Family" have not premiered in 2d or VR online and are only available to view at Björk Digital though in an interview with Starpro in Mexico, Björk revealed there are still plans to offer the full "Vulnicura VR" experience for download on mobile devices. She also revealed no further VR videos are being planned, meaning the songs "History of Touches" and "Atom Dance" will not receive accompanying music videos.

On 20 May 2017, Björk upload a 10-second preview clip to Facebook of surprise brand new 2d music video for "Notget", directed by long-time collaborators Warren du Preez and Nick Thornton, which debuted in full in the cinema room of Björk Digital in Los Angeles. The full video was made available 2 days after the VR exhibit closed in LA, debuting online at Creators, VICE's arts and culture platform, on 6 June 2017. Speaking to the website, co-director Thornton said, "Björk definitely wanted more of a claustrophobic, confined environment, and to then be able to switch that up. The switch to elation was very much driven by how she wants to see things." Added du Preez, "We made the decision to submerge it into almost what we almost call an inner earth or into a place that could house that decay and bruising."

While videos were made for the above songs to promote the album, no official singles were released.

=== Vulnicura remix series ===
On 9 July 2015, Dazed Digital unveiled the first of a 3 part series of Vulnicura remixes. Series 1 features the first of two Lotic remixes of the track "Notget" (the Keptsafe version), a "Family" remix by Katie Gately, a remix of "History of Touches" by Krampfhaft, and a remix of "Lionsong" by Mica Levi. Levi explained her karaoke-inspired version: "I did a karaoke version more than a remix, because I love her string arrangements and thought it would be an opportunity to draw attention to them."

The second series debuted on 22 July and features a Choral mix of "Lionsong" created by Björk herself. She sampled an early track by UNTOLD and utilized the Icelandic female choir Graduale Nobili, which had previously performed on Björk's Biophilia. The 2nd wave also includes "History of Touches", the Rabit Naked Mix, and The Haxan Cloak's remix of "Mouth Mantra". The Haxan Cloak co-produced and mixed Vulnicura, and stated, "When it came time to start thinking about prepping for the live shows, Björk asked me if there were any songs I'd like to remix for playing live – instantly I thought of (Mouth Mantra). I wanted to keep the core of the song but just really amp up the drama and intensity to 11... I then decided to refine the live remix for a more studio/headphone listening environment, so that's what you hear now." A fourth remix, Lotic's Fromdeath version of "Notget" was later released as a vinyl exclusive mix.

The final Vulnicura remix series debuted on 2 October and features 4 new remixes: "Black Lake" and "Family" remixes by Bloom, "Lionsong", the Juliana Huxtable Remix, and "Stonemilker", the Patten Rework. Björk capped off the Vulnicura remix series by stating, "I would like to thank especially Robin Carolan for co-curating this with me. Its been such a pleasure!!!" in a note published on Dazed with the 3rd wave's digital release.

Eventually all 12 remixes were released on vinyl through One Little Indian in 12 limited edition single-sided etched translucent 12" records in die-cut sleeves. The third vinyl remix series was released on 20 November 2015. Each vinyl single managed to chart on the Official Charts Company Physical Singles and Vinyl Singles Sales in the UK. On the physical single chart "History of Touches" peaked at No. 20, "Mouth Mantra" peaked at No. 30, "Black Lake" peaked at No. 31, "Stonemilker" at No. 35, "Family" at No. 18 and the highest peaking "Lionsong" at No. 12. On the vinyl singles chart "History of Touches" peaked at No. 12, "Mouth Mantra" at No. 16, "Black Lake" at No. 17, "Stonemilker" at No. 21, "Lionsong" at No. 10, and "Family" at No. 13.

== Vulnicura Strings ==
On 6 November 2015, Vulnicura Strings (Vulnicura: The Acoustic Version – Strings, Voice and Viola Organista Only), or simply Vulnicura Strings, was released, featuring eight of Vulnicura's nine tracks in strings only renditions in what has been described as a more uncompromising and intimate take on Vulnicura. It features the same vocals as the studio album but without the beats of co-producers Arca and The Haxan Cloak. The album includes additional string arrangements by Una Sveinbjarnardóttir, who was a part of the Icelandic String Octet that joined Björk on stage for her 1998 Homogenic tour, as well as alternate takes of string arrangements recorded during Vulnicura's original recording sessions that Björk felt were more appropriate for the far more delicate atmosphere of Vulnicura Strings. Additionally, several songs utilize the Viola Organista, a unique instrument designed by Leonardo da Vinci but built for the first time centuries later by the Polish musician Sławomir Zubrzycki.

Björk stated on her Facebook page, "While I was working on Vulnicura, it became one of the most magical thing(s) both musically and spiritually to unite the electronics and the acoustic instruments in an almost romantic way: to prove they can coexist!!... But while working on it I felt somehow for the first time, this was an album that could take another version: a reveal, to simply have the acoustics stand on their own for the folks who wanna indulge even further into the wooden timeless side of this music. With no techno." This project is Björk's first completely acoustic studio album.

== Live performances ==
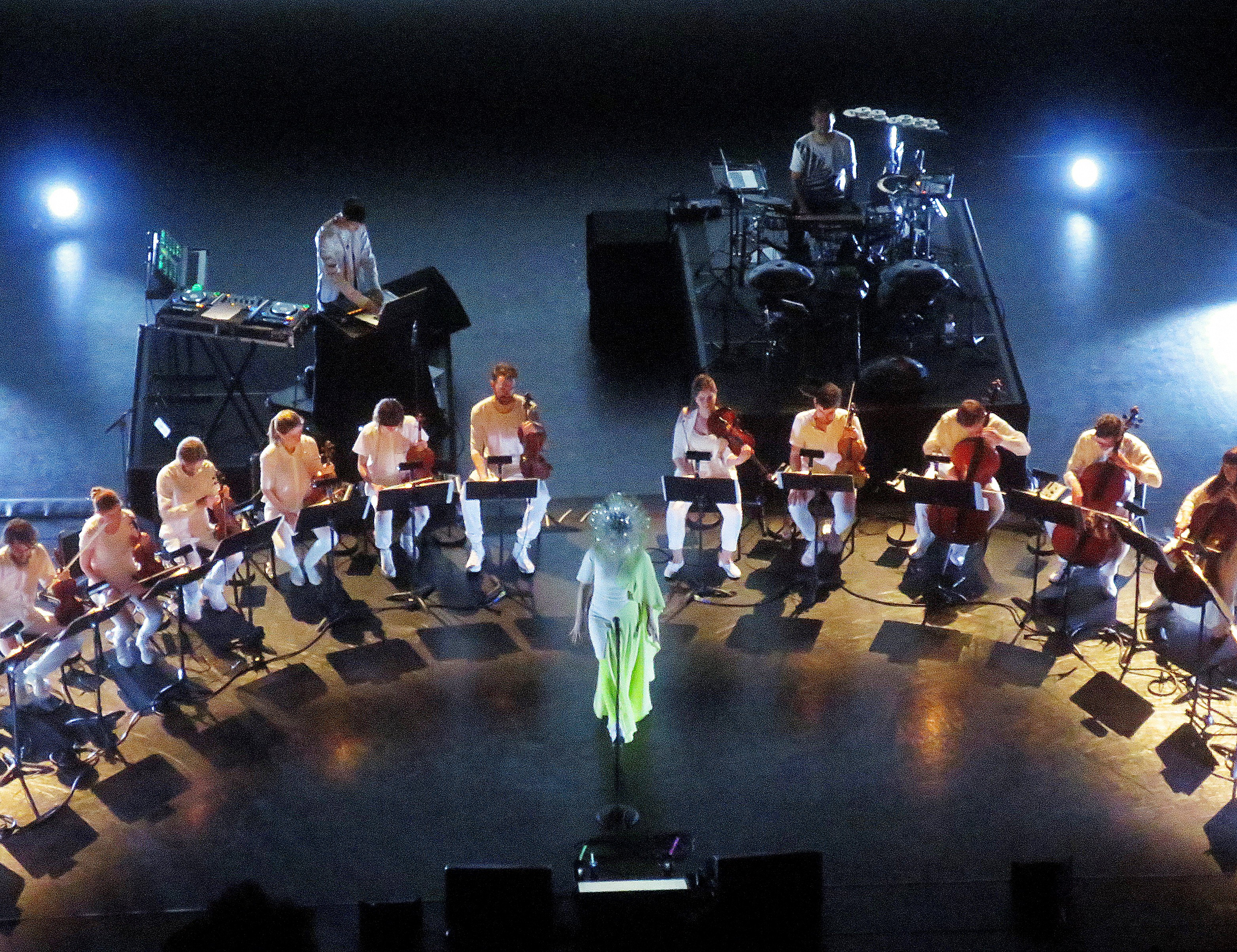
Björk performing at the New York City Center, accompanied by Alarm Will Sound, Arca and Manu Delago

On 7 January 2015, Björk was announced as one of the performers of the 2015 Governors Ball. It was her first confirmed appearance since the conclusion of the Biophilia tour and her first concert in New York City since 2012. On 16 January 2015, she confirmed the upcoming Vulnicura tour by announcing six dates through March and April in New York, where she performed at the Stern Auditorium at Carnegie Hall and the New York City Center. She later added two shows at Brooklyn's Kings Theatre sandwiched in between the Carnegie Hall and City Center shows.

On 8 August 2015, Björk officially announced the abrupt end of the Vulnicura tour, stating, "These have truly been some of my most sublime moments!! Singing this album has been intense and the internal clock of it different to the other ones. It has sort of had to behave in its own little way. Both the urgency of the leak and now this sudden closure for reasons beyond my control is characteristic of that. I hope through the years I have earned enough tourkarma points to get your support for this." She added, "I have started writing new songs and feel the best most natural pathway to go is to let this beast flow its natural course and start anew." Four upcoming shows were cancelled, making the Vulnicura tour her first concert not to travel to her native Iceland.

Björk did not do any televised or radio performances to promote Vulnicura and none of the 16 Vulnicura tour shows are known to have been taped, marking it the only tour of her career not be documented visually.

On 21 September 2016, Björk gave her first of 6 acoustic-only live concerts, beginning at the Royal Albert Hall in London and ending at the Walt Disney Concert Hall in Los Angeles. These shows follow the format of the original Vulnicura tour with the first six songs from the album performed uninterrupted with the second half of the show featuring mostly songs from her back catalogue. Other stops on the brief acoustic tour included Iceland and Mexico City. She performed electronic sets at festivals at the same time, including FYF Fest in Downtown LA and Ceremonia in Toulca, Mexico.

The visual aesthetics of Vulnicura were marked with masks, prominently made by James T. Merry.

== Vulnicura VR ==
Vulnicura VR
- Artwork used on Steam

Video by Björk
- Released: September 6, 2019
- Recorded: 2014–2018
- Label: One Little Indian
- Directors: Andrew Thomas Huang; Inez and Vinoodh; Björk; James Merry; Warren Du Preez and Nick Thornton Jones; Jesse Kanda; Dentsu Lab Tokyo

Björk chronology
Björk: Biophilia Live (2014)	Vulnicura VR (2019)	Cornucopia Live (2025)

On 31 May 2016, Björk announced on her official Facebook page Björk Digital, an 18-month world traveling VR experience that debuted at Carriageworks in Sydney, Australia, on 3 June 2016. The VR music video for Vulnicura's final narrative track, "Notget" debuted at the festival, which also showcased the VR videos for "Stonemilker" and "Mouth Mantra", the latter of which also debuting in VR after premiering months earlier in 2D on YouTube in December 2015. On 27 June 2016, Björk made history by appearing in the first ever virtual reality live stream. Broadcast on YouTube, she performed Vulnicura's final song, "Quicksand", before a small audience and the footage was incorporated into the "Quicksand" VR music video later on during Björk Digital.

In addition to the VR experience, attendees of Björk Digital experienced a recreation of the "Black Lake" installation, which debuted at MoMA's Björk retrospective in March 2015. Other carryovers from MoMA included the Cinema Room showcasing the majority of her music videos in HD and the Biophilia app, although the innovative instruments from that 2011 album were not on display at Björk Digital.

The opening nights of Björk Digital in Sydney saw Björk DJ for 5 hours. This opening night party continued at the Miraikan in Tokyo, Japan, for the second leg of the Björk Digital VR experience and at several other opening night dates. For select dates in London, Reykjavik, Mexico City and Los Angeles, Björk performed special orchestral concerts rather than DJing to promote the VR exhibit.

In June 2017, "Notget VR" won Cannes Lions Grand Prix Award for its "Real Time Virtual Reality Experience". It was also nominated for a UK Music Video Award for Best Interactive Video in 2017.

On 24 September 2018, Music Week published an interview with Andrew Melchior, technical adviser on Björk Digital, where he said that the full Vulnicura VR album will be out before Christmas 2018 via One Little Indian and will be available across all VR platforms. On 6 September 2019, Vulnicura VR album was released on Steam, featuring all the VR videos with additional visualisers for "History of Touches" and "Atom Dance" made by Stephen Malinowski.

In December 2024, it was announced that Vulnicura VR would be remastered by PulseJet Studios, which would upgrade and enhance it to Meta Quest and Apple Vision Pro platforms and re-release it in 2025.

== Vulnicura Live ==
On 22 October 2015, record shop Rough Trade announced an exclusive release entitled Vulnicura Live, a collection of 14 songs selected and mixed by Björk that were recorded throughout her 2015 Vulnicura tour. The 2xCD and 2xLP sets are limited to 1000 copies per format and available exclusively through Rough Trade. The CD edition was released on 13 November 2015 and comes with 4 photo prints in a clear plastic sleeve. The LP set consisted of 2 picture discs and was released on 20 November 2015, 2 weeks ahead of its originally announced date of 4 December.

Both sets sold out online in less than a week but limited quantities of both formats were available at Rough Trade shops throughout London and Brooklyn, NY on release date. The first 100 people to preorder the vinyl received a wristband that got them into a special DJ set with Björk and Arca at the Rough Trade East store in London. The event took place on Halloween night, 2015.

On 15 July 2016, a standard "commercial" release of Vulnicura Live was released by One Little Indian featuring 13 of the same tracks as the Rough Trade exclusive (excluding "All Neon Like") on both CD and 2xLP sets, as well as a Luxury Edition Boxset featuring both formats and extras in September 2016.

== Critical reception ==
Professional ratings
Aggregate scores
Source	Rating
AnyDecentMusic?	8.2/10
Metacritic	87/100
Review scores
Source	Rating
AllMusic	5/5 stars
The A.V. Club	B+
Chicago Tribune	3.5/4 stars
The Daily Telegraph	4/5 stars
The Guardian	4/5 stars
Los Angeles Times	3.5/4 stars
NME	8/10
Pitchfork	8.6/10
Rolling Stone	4/5 stars
Spin	8/10

Vulnicura was met with widespread critical acclaim. At Metacritic, which assigns a normalised rating out of 100 to reviews from mainstream publications, the album received an average score of 87, based on 40 reviews. Many critics have referred to it as her best work in the last decade and the boldest move after 2011's Biophilia. It has also been compared stylistically to her critically acclaimed albums Homogenic and Vespertine.

Praise has centered around the "emotional honesty and musical daring" used to portray the album's deeply personal themes. The lyrics have been described as some of her "strongest and most moving" and Björk's voice "miraculously expressive". On the less positive side, longtime music critic Robert Christgau claimed, "I always thought she was too lifelike for him anyway." He cited "Stonemilker" and "Atom Dance" as standout tracks.

=== Accolades ===
Rough Trade named it their album of the year for 2015, calling it "a truly extraordinary work of art" and describing Björk herself as "an inspirational game-changer, someone we hugely respect and admire."

Rolling Stone also included it in their list of favourite albums of the year, describing it as "the most heart-rending music she's ever made."

Consequence of Sound named it in their list, "Highest Rated Albums of 2015", at number twenty-one, whilst Vice named Vulnicura the 38th best album of 2015, calling it an "interactive art piece".

It placed fifth in a countdown of the year's best albums in The Guardian, who praised Björk's "harrowingly expressive compositions".

The album was described as "brave, beautiful and affecting" by NME and was positioned at number twenty-five on their "Albums of the Year 2015" list.

Cosmopolitan ranked it at number eight on their "The 15 Best Albums of 2015" year-end survey, commenting that the album is "downright uplifting".

Newsday called the album "a singular artistic work to stand against other 'breakup albums' for years to come" and it made it to number thirteen on their "Best Albums of 2015" list.

It also appeared on the "Albums That Defined 2015" list by Chart Attack.

Björk won the International Female Solo Artist at the Brit Awards; this was her 5th prize at the annual ceremony.

Vulnicura was nominated for the Best Alternative Music Award at the 58th Annual Grammy Awards; this is Björk's seventh nomination in the category.

It was also nominated for the Album of the Year Award at the AIM Independent Music Awards.

Björk was nominated for the International Producer of the Year award for Vulnicura by The Music Producers Guild.

Moreover, Vulnicura was nominated for the Best Album of 2015 for The Phonofile Nordic Music Prize.

At the Icelandic Music Awards, Vulnicura won Best Album while Björk was named Best Female Artist, Best Songwriter and Best Producer.

Year-end accolades (2015) for Vulnicura
Publication	Accolade	Year	Rank	Ref.
The 405	The 30 Best Albums of 2015	2015	3	
ABC News	50 Best Albums of 2015	2015	1	
Bleep	Albums of the Year 2015	2015	4	
Clash	Albums Of The Year 2015	2015	4	
Consequence of Sound	Top 50 Albums of 2015	2015	16	
Cosmopolitan	The 15 Best Albums of 2015	2015	8	
Crack Magazine	Albums Of The Year 2015	2015	2	
Dazed	The top 20 albums of 2015	2015	5	
Double J	The 50 best albums of 2015	2015	4	
Drowned in Sound	Albums Of The Year: 2015	2015	3	
Exclaim!	Top 20 Pop & Rock Albums	2015	6	
Fopp	The best albums of 2015	2015	5	
Gigwise	Albums Of The Year	2015	15	
The Guardian	Best Albums of 2015	2015	5	
The Irish Times	50 Best Albums of 2015	2015	5	
Mashable	The 30 best albums of 2015	2015	20	
musicOMH	Top 50 Albums Of 2015	2015	5	
The New York Times	Best Albums of 2015	2015	5	
Newsday	Best Albums of 2015	2015	13	
NME	NME'S Albums of the Year 2015	2015	25	
Pitchfork	The 50 Best Albums of 2015	2015	15	
Resident Advisor	Top 20 albums of 2015	2015	5	
Reverb	The ten best albums of 2015	2015	9	
Rough Trade	Albums of the Year 2015	2015	1	
The Skinny	The 50 Best Albums of 2015	2015	10	
Slant Magazine	The 25 Best Albums of 2015	2015	19	
Slate	Best of 2015: Top 25 Albums	2015	n/a	
Spin	The 50 Best Albums of 2015	2015	28	
StarPulse	25 Best Albums Of 2015	2015	9	
Stereogum	The 50 Best Albums of 2015	2015	38	
The Sydney Morning Herald	Top 10 albums of 2015	2015	5	
Time Out New York	25 best albums of 2015	2015	2	
Tiny Mix Tapes	2015: Favorite 50 Music Releases	2015	9	
Uncut	The Best Albums Of 2015	2015	11	
The Vinyl Factory	The 50 best LPs of 2015	2015	7	
The Wire	2015 Rewind: Best Records of the Year	2015	13	

Decade-end accolades (2010–2019) for Vulnicura
Publication	Accolade	Year published	Rank	Ref.
AllMusic	The AllMusic Decade in Review	2019	N/A	
Consequence of Sound	Top 100 Albums of the 2010s	2019	42	
Crack Magazine	The Top 100 Albums of the Decade	2019	21	
The Independent	The 50 Best Albums of the Last Decade	2019	32	
Pitchfork	The 200 Best Albums of the 2010s	2019	56	
Resident Advisor	2010-19: Albums of the Decade	2019?	N/A	
Slant Magazine	The 100 Best Albums of the 2010s	2019	N/A	
Stereogum	The 100 Best Albums of the 2010s	2019	73	

== Track listing ==
All lyrics written by Björk, except "Atom Dance", written with Oddný Eir Ævarsdóttir.

Vulnicura
No.	Title	Music	Producer(s)	Length
1.	"Stonemilker"	Björk	Björk	6:49
2.	"Lionsong"	Björk	Björk; Arca	6:08
3.	"History of Touches"	Björk	Björk; Arca	3:00
4.	"Black Lake"	Björk	Björk; Arca	10:08
5.	"Family"	Björk; Arca	Björk; The Haxan Cloak; Arca	8:02
6.	"Notget"	Björk; Arca	Björk; Arca	6:26
7.	"Atom Dance" (featuring Anohni)	Björk	Björk; Arca	8:10
8.	"Mouth Mantra"	Björk	Björk; Arca	6:09
9.	"Quicksand"	Björk; Spaces	Björk	3:45
Total length:				58:36

Sample credits

- "Quicksand" samples "Apologies" written and performed by John Flynn (also known as Spaces).

== Personnel ==
Credits adapted from the liner notes of Vulnicura.

=== Musicians ===
- Björk – vocals, programming, string arrangements, vocal arrangements
- Arca – programming
- John Flynn (aka Spaces) – programming
- The Haxan Cloak – programming
- Anohni – vocals (track 7)
- U Strings – strings
- Choir
  - Ásta Ægisdóttir, Auður Albertsdóttir, Ásdís Björg Gestsdóttir, Ásdís Eva Ólafsdóttir, Bergljót Rafnar Karlsdóttir, Drífa Örvarsdóttir, Elín Edda Sigurðardóttir, Erla María Markúsdóttir, Fífa Jónsdóttir, Gígja Gylfadóttir, Gígja Haraldsdóttir, Guðrún Matthildur Sigurbergsdóttir, Sigrún Ósk Jóhannesdóttir, Unnur Sigurðardóttir

=== Technical personnel ===
- Björk – production
- Arca – production (tracks: 2–8)
- The Haxan Cloak – production (track 5); mixing
- Chris Elms – mixing, recording, engineering
- Frank Arthur Blöndahl Cassata – recording, engineering
- Bart Migal – engineering
- Michael Pärt – recording supervising (tracks: 4, 7, 8)
- Mandy Parnell – mastering
- James Merry – album coordination, research, personal assistance
- Mani Þorkelsson – string recording assistance
- Biggi – string recording assistance
- Joel Davies – string mix session assistance
- Graeme Baldwin – string mix session assistance

=== Artwork ===
- Björk – cover character
- Inez van Lamsweerde and Vinoodh Matadin – photography
- M/M Paris – design
- Mel Ottenberg – styling
- Christiaan – hair
- Dick Page – makeup

== Charts ==
=== Weekly charts ===
Weekly chart performance for Vulnicura
Chart (2015)	Peak position
Australian Albums (ARIA)	26
Austrian Albums (Ö3 Austria)	19
Belgian Albums (Ultratop Flanders)	12
Belgian Albums (Ultratop Wallonia)	4
Canadian Albums (Billboard)	12
Croatian Albums (HDU)	42
Czech Albums (ČNS IFPI)	8
Danish Albums (Hitlisten)	3
Dutch Albums (Album Top 100)	10
French Albums (SNEP)	10
Finnish Albums (Suomen virallinen lista)	14
German Albums (Offizielle Top 100)	11
Hungarian Albums (MAHASZ)	22
Icelandic Albums (Tónlist)	1
Irish Albums (IRMA)	12
Irish Independent Albums (IRMA)	2
Italian Albums (FIMI)	25
Japanese Albums (Oricon)	30
New Zealand Albums (RMNZ)	30
Norwegian Albums (VG-lista)	4
Polish Albums (ZPAV)	48
Russian Albums (2M)	3
Scottish Albums (Official Charts)	22
South Korean International Albums (Gaon)	50
Spanish Albums (Promusicae)	16
Swedish Albums (Sverigetopplistan)	26
Swiss Albums (Schweizer Hitparade)	6
UK Albums (Official Charts)	11
UK Independent Albums (Official Charts)	3
US Billboard 200	20
US Independent Albums (Billboard)	3
US Top Alternative Albums (Billboard)	5
US Top Rock Albums (Billboard)	6

=== Year-end charts ===
2015 year-end chart performance for Vulnicura
Chart (2015)	Position
Belgian Albums (Ultratop Flanders)	116
Belgian Albums (Ultratop Wallonia)	142
French Albums (SNEP)	127
US Independent Albums (Billboard)	34

2016 year-end chart performance for Vulnicura
Chart (2016)	Position
Icelandic Albums (Tónlistinn)	89

== Sales ==
Region	Certification	Certified units/sales
France	—	30,000

== Release history ==
List of release dates, showing region, release format, and label
Region	Date	Format(s)	Label	Ref
Worldwide	20 January 2015	Digital download	One Little Indian (UK); Megaforce (US); Sony Music (Indonesia); Embassy of Music (Germany)	
Worldwide	16 March 2015	CD; LP	One Little Indian (UK); Megaforce (US); Sony Music (Indonesia); Embassy of Music (Germany)	
Worldwide	24 July 2015	Limited edition yellow LP	One Little Indian (UK); Megaforce (US); Sony Music (Indonesia); Embassy of Music (Germany)	
