= Vulnicura Live =

- Standard edition

Live album by Björk
- Released: 6 November 2015 (Rough Trade exclusive); 15 July 2016 (commercial release)
- Recorded: 2015
- Genre: Electronica; chamber pop; experimental
- Length: 84:00 (Rough Trade exclusive); 78:47 (commercial release)
- Label: One Little Independent Records
- Producer: Björk

Björk chronology
Vulnicura Strings (2015)	Vulnicura Live (2015)	Utopia (2017)

Alternative cover
- Rough Trade exclusive package

Vulnicura Live is a live album by Icelandic singer-songwriter Björk featuring 14 songs performed during her 2015 Vulnicura tour featuring The Heritage Orchestra. The original release was available exclusively through Rough Trade record shops in very limited quantities and is published by One Little Indian. Its online allotment quickly sold out but a limited number of CDs and LPs were available at Rough Trade brick and mortar stores on release day. The sets are now out of print. The album was followed 8 months later by a standard commercial release featuring an altered track order and new artwork taken during the Vulnicura tour.

== Background ==
On 21 October 2015, the official Rough Trade website posted an early listing of separate 2 x CD / 2 x LP sets entitled Vulnicura Live, a collection of 14 songs recorded on Björk's 2015 tour to promote her critically acclaimed album, Vulnicura. The live album was mixed and put together by Björk herself with help from Arca, in which she produced a new version of "Come to Me" for the Vulnicura tour and The Haxan Cloak, her co-producers on Vulnicura. The sets were officially announced the following day, and were limited to 1000 copies for each format and available exclusively through Rough Trade. Initial reports incorrectly stated that the double album would feature 7 Vulnicura songs and 7 songs from Björk's previous albums.

The CD edition was released on 6 November 2015 and comes with 4 photo prints in a clear plastic sleeve, with the LP following on 20 November 2015. The vinyl set omits one song, "All Neon Like", and the records are presented as double-sided picture discs in place of the photo prints. The Rough Trade exclusive vinyl is the first official picture disc in Björk's discography. The vinyl sold out within 2 days followed by the CD edition 3 days later, but limited quantities of the album were made available at Rough Trade stores throughout London and in Brooklyn, NY on their respective release dates. However, the Rough Trade East store made their CD copies available in stores nearly a week early, and due to a much faster production turnaround, the vinyl release was moved up by 2 weeks from its initial December 4 release date.

The first 100 people that preordered the vinyl received a wristband that allowed them entry into a special DJ set with Björk and Arca at the Rough Trade East store in London that took place on Halloween night, 2015. Although only a limited number of copies were produced the vinyl edition of the album managed to enter the UK Official Vinyl Albums Chart at #12.

Rumors of a standard release of Vulnicura Live began when Amazon Japan put up a listing for a 2 disc edition of Vulnicura Live slated for release in January 2016. The release never materialized. Months later Amazon US put up a pre-order page for Vulnicura Live with little information. Soon after a track list was uploaded. On 14 June 2016 Björk officially announced the set on her Facebook page, slated for a July 2016 release.

The 2016 commercial release of Vulnicura Live features 13 tracks approximating the Rough Trade vinyl track list although the order of the tracks is slightly altered. The tracks themselves use the same elements/performances as the previous edition though this 2016 release was mastered by Björk, Arca and Chris Elms, who mixed the original studio version of Vulnicura and the complementary album Vulnicura Strings in 2015, where as the Rough Trade exclusive was mixed by Björk with input from Vulnicura co-producers Arca and The Haxan Cloak. The Vulnicura tour version of "All Neon Like" remains exclusive to the Rough Trade CD edition.

In addition to the standard 2xLP and single CD sets, there will be a Luxury Edition Boxset which features both the CD and vinyl editions, a 320 kbit/s mp3 download card, a set of 6 photo prints housed in a glassine sleeve, plus an exclusive 3D low polygon Björk moth paper mask in pieces to build with a set of instructions included. The mask was developed in collaboration with Wintercroft and is based on a James Merry original design Björk first wore at the Governor's Ball festival in June 2015.

The single format editions was released on 15 July 2016 while the Luxury Edition was released on 23 September 2016.

== Track listing ==
Rough Trade exclusive
No.	Title	Writer(s)	Original version on:	Length
1.	"Stonemilker"	Björk	Vulnicura	7:24
2.	"Lionsong"	Björk	Vulnicura	6:35
3.	"History of Touches"	Björk	Vulnicura	3:19
4.	"Black Lake"	Björk	Vulnicura	10:45
5.	"Family"	Björk; Arca	Vulnicura	7:50
6.	"Notget"	Björk; Arca	Vulnicura	5:10
7.	"Come to Me"	Björk	Debut	5:17
8.	"Undo"	Björk; Thomas Knak	Vespertine	6:11
9.	"I See Who You Are"	Björk; Mark Bell	Volta	3:52
10.	"All Neon Like"	Björk	Homogenic	5:54
11.	"Quicksand"	Björk; Spaces	Vulnicura	4:05
12.	"Wanderlust"	Björk; Sjón	Volta	6:18
13.	"Mutual Core"	Björk	Biophilia	4:59
14.	"Mouth Mantra"	Björk	Vulnicura	6:29
Total length:				84:00

Rough Trade exclusive vinyl edition
No.	Title	Writer(s)	Length
1.	"Stonemilker"	Björk	7:24
2.	"Lionsong"	Björk	6:35
3.	"History of Touches"	Björk	3:19
4.	"Black Lake"	Björk	10:45
5.	"Family"	Björk; Arca	7:50
6.	"Notget"	Björk; Arca	5:10
7.	"Come to Me"	Björk	5:17
8.	"Undo"	Björk; Knak	6:11
9.	"I See Who You Are"	Björk; Bell	3:52
10.	"Quicksand"	Björk; Spaces	4:05
11.	"Wanderlust"	Björk; Sjón	6:18
12.	"Mutual Core"	Björk	4:59
13.	"Mouth Mantra"	Björk	6:29
Total length:			78:06

Standard edition
No.	Title	Writer(s)	Original version on:	Length
1.	"Stonemilker"	Björk	Vulnicura	7:25
2.	"Lionsong"	Björk	Vulnicura	6:36
3.	"History of Touches"	Björk	Vulnicura	3:18
4.	"Black Lake"	Björk	Vulnicura	10:44
5.	"Family"	Björk; Arca	Vulnicura	7:51
6.	"Notget"	Björk; Arca	Vulnicura	5:14
7.	"Undo"	Björk; Knak	Vespertine	6:13
8.	"Come to Me"	Björk	Debut	5:23
9.	"I See Who You Are"	Björk; Bell	Volta	4:05
10.	"Wanderlust"	Björk; Sjón	Volta	6:20
11.	"Quicksand"	Björk; Spaces	Vulnicura	3:59
12.	"Mutual Core"	Björk	Biophilia	5:09
13.	"Mouth Mantra"	Björk	Vulnicura	6:29
Total length:				78:47

== Charts ==
Rough Trade exclusive
Chart (2016)	Peak position
UK Vinyl Albums (OCC)	12

Commercial release
Chart (2016)	Peak position
Belgian Albums (Ultratop Wallonia)	180
French Albums (SNEP)	116
UK Independent Albums (OCC)	27
