= Lionsong =

- Mica Levi remix artwork

Promotional single by Björk

from the album Vulnicura
- Released: 2015
- Genre: Electronic; avant-garde
- Length: 6:08
- Label: One Little Indian
- Songwriter: Björk
- Producers: Björk; Arca

Music video
- "Lionsong" on YouTube

"Lionsong" is the second song by Icelandic singer and musician Björk from her eighth studio album, Vulnicura. It was written and composed by Björk and features beats by Venezuelan musician Arca, who co-produced the track with her.

"Lionsong" was released as a promotional single to radio stations in some territories, including the US, by One Little Indian Records in late 2015 and received limited airplay in a shortened radio version. Vulnicura saw no official commercial singles, digital or physical, the first for a Björk studio album, though several versions of "Lionsong" exist due to the various supplementary projects that accompanied the original Vulnicura album.

== Background and composition ==
In late 2013, a 14-second video clip appeared on Instagram showing a close up of a computer monitor with software running and recording a melody for strings. The video teased it was new music from Björk, but after 2011's innovative and experimental Biophilia many doubted the lush string arrangement came from Björk. The video was in fact a snippet of the melody of "Lionsong". The video was apparently recorded in the Nordic House in Reykjavík, Iceland and uploaded by a sound engineer but was quickly taken down. It can, however, still be found on other video sharing sites such as YouTube.

"Lionsong" was written 5 months before Björk's breakup with American contemporary artist and filmmaker Matthew Barney, and the breakup fueled most of the material on Vulnicura. In "Lionsong", Björk describes being stuck in an uncertain place in their relationship. "Maybe he will come out of this loving me / maybe he won't," she sings, before coming to the conclusion, "Somehow I'm not too bothered / either way." She demands clarity while her partner seemingly wants things foggy and unresolved.

Björk recalled the genesis of the song to Rolling Stone magazine, which occurred shortly after recovering from vocal cord surgery in 2013: "I couldn't speak for three weeks… But the album was a new beginning. The chorus in "Lionsong" – I was in this forest outside Reykjavík, warming up, opening my throat like a bird. It was cathartic."

The public first heard "Lionsong" when Vulnicura leaked in full on 18 January 2015. The album was rush released on iTunes on 20 January, and "Lionsong" has remained a favorite of fans and critics alike.

== Remixes and alternate versions ==
While no singles were released to promote Vulnicura, Björk did release several companion projects to the original studio album, the first of which was the three-part Vulnicura Remix Series. "Lionsong" is the most oft remixed song from Vulnicura and a remix of it was released during every wave of the Vulnicura Remix Series.

The first is a karaoke-inspired remix by Mica Levi, an English singer, songwriter and composer. Björk described her relationship to Levi's music on Dazed Digital's exclusive premiere of the remix series: "Mica is someone I have been following growing since 2008. Like a proud aunt, I might even have been at her first concert? Sooo exciting to witness her grow into a full on composer carry(ing) the weight of such things as (the soundtrack to) "Under the Skin." For her part, Levi stated, "I did a karaoke version more than a remix, because I love her string arrangements and thought it would be an opportunity to draw attention to them. I hope Björk isn't offended that I took her voice out, [but] you can hear it in your head – or sing along."

The second remix, released as part of the second wave of the Vulnicura Remix series, was created by Björk herself featuring Graduale Nobili, the Icelandic choir that joined her on the Biophilia tour (2011–2013). Its beat samples an early track from UNTOLD called "Flexible". UNTOLD revealed that he learned the remix would be officially released after one of Björk's 2015 New York City Center shows in early 2015.

The final remix for "Lionsong" is by Juliana Huxtable, an American DJ and poet. Huxtable described her emotional connection to "Lionsong" on Dazed in October 2015: "I really just fell for the album in general but "Lionsong" specifically went straight to this really guttural and spiritual place for me. I was dealing with a lot at the time – doing a lot of healing after a really difficult love and this song brought me through. I started playing it in my club sets and it works to take people to this really insane place. Even after I've mended, it's one of the most powerful songs I've heard in so long and when Björk asked if I'd like to do a remix I naturally freaked out. I tried to think through what elements would take the song to a 'catch the holy ghost' experience in the context of a body in motion - dancing or exorcising. I worked with my friend and frequent collaborator false witness in the studio to really perfect the vision I had for this track and I hope that it does it honor."

All three remixes were released digitally and on limited edition translucent vinyl. Only 5,000 copies were made for the first 2 and only 1,000 copies made for the Juliana Huxtable Remix (and wave 3 in general).

Following the Vulnicura Remix Series, Björk released Vulnicura Strings, a collection of acoustic only versions of the Vulnicura songs. "Lionsong" received a strings-only version with an additional violin solo done by Una Sveinbjarnardóttir, who was a part of the Icelandic String Octet that joined Björk on stage for her 1998 Homogenic tour.

The final commercially released version of "Lionsong" can be found on Vulnicura Live, a collection of performances done during the Vulnicura tour throughout 2015. The performance is taken mostly from her 22 March 2015 gig at the Kings Theater in Brooklyn, NY though a different opening taken from elsewhere on the tour was edited in.

Like "Stonemilker", "Lionsong" also received a radio edit for airplay. However, "Lionsong" received more airtime as it was the most commercially viable and popular track from Vulnicura. The "Lionsong" (Radio Edit) was made available for play on American radio stations on 9 December 2015 via One Little Indian Records.

== Critical reception ==
"Lionsong" has proven itself one of Vulnicura's most popular songs and has been described as "majestic and sad" by Spencer Kornhaber of The Atlantic and "tense" by The Telegraph. Noisey called it, "One of the most unforgettable and foreboding tracks," on Vulnicura.

== Music video ==
"Lionsong" was the first music video from Vulnicura to be shown publicly outside of the Museum of Modern Art. It premiered online via Noisey on 12 March 2015 before showing at the MoMA's Björk retrospective that same month. It played in the Cinema Room as part of her nearly complete videography.

The video was directed by Björk's frequent collaborators Inez van Lamsweerde and Vinoodh Matadin. They first worked together in 1999 when creating the cover art for Volumen, Björk's then complete collection of music videos on DVD.

Speaking to Artsy, Inez described the creation of the video, which began as the photo shoot for the Vulnicura album cover: "Björk sent a beautiful video of a spider molting out of its own skin and becoming translucent, and then filling up with color again. For her, that was really the basis of the imagery around this album, this transformation and soft, waxy, yellow-pink coloring… She said she wanted to have a wound on her body, on her heart, in an abstract way. From there, we worked with our stylist Mel Ottenberg on the character, and that's when he found this black latex suit and the headpiece by a Japanese designer [Maiko Takeda], which she'd already worn once on stage…" during the summer of 2013 while touring Biophilia.

"Björk's character for "Lionsong" had to be smooth like a spider waiting in her web and seductive like a Balinese dancer cast in bronze," the duo told Noisey. "She is seen as if under a microscope, baring her heart while luring us inside the bloody galaxy of her own wound."

It was during the album cover's photo shoot that Inez came up with the idea of shooting a music video for one of Vulnicura's songs, a similar practice that resulted in the "Moon" music video from 2011's Biophilia. Visual effects production house Framestore created the special effects, namely the pulsating chest wound, the galaxy inside Björk's wound, and the extension of Björk's legs to further liken her to a spider.

== Charts ==
Chart (2015)	Peak position
Iceland (RÚV)	21
