= 34 Scores for Piano, Organ, Harpsichord and Celeste =

2017 book by Björk

- Author: Björk
- Genre: Sheet music
- Publisher: Wise Publications
- Publication date: 5 June 2017
- ISBN: 978-1-78558-551-7

34 Scores for Piano, Organ, Harpsichord and Celeste is a song book by Icelandic singer Björk, published by Wise Publications on June 5, 2017. Björk worked on the book, which includes arrangements of songs from Debut (1993), Post (1995), Homogenic (1997), Selmasongs (2000), Vespertine (2001), Medúlla (2004), Drawing Restraint 9 (2005), Volta (2007), and Vulnicura (2015), in collaboration with Icelandic pianist Jónas Sen, the art and design partnership M/M Paris, and the engraving company Notengrafik Berlin, over the course of six years.

== Scores ==
Following is a complete list of scores in 34 Scores:

- "All Is Full of Love" – Homogenic (for Celeste)
- "The Anchor Song" – Debut (for Organ)
- "Atom Dance" – Vulnicura (for Organ)
- "Atom Dance" – Vulnicura (for Piano)
- "Aurora" – Vespertine (for Harpsichord)
- "Bachelorette" – Homogenic (for Piano)
- "Black Lake" – Vulnicura (for Organ)
- "Cover Me" – Post (for Organ)
- "Declare Independence" – Volta (for Piano)
- "Desired Constellation" – Medúlla (for Organ) (includes an alternate ending)
- "The Dull Flame of Desire" – Volta (for Organ)
- "Gratitude" – Drawing Restraint 9 (for Celeste)
- "I've Seen It All" – Selmasongs (for Organ)
- "Immature" – Homogenic (for Piano)
- "Isobel" – Post (for Organ)
- "Jóga" – Homogenic (for Organ)
- "Mother Heroic" – Vespertine (B-side to "Hidden Place") (for Celeste)
- "My Juvenile" – Volta (for Harpsichord)
- "New World" – Selmasongs (for Piano)
- "Notget" – Vulnicura (for Piano)
- "Notget" – Vulnicura (for Piano - easy version)
- "Oceania" – Medúlla (for Piano)
- "Oceania" – Medúlla (for Piano - easy version)
- "Oceania" – Medúlla (for Two Pianos)
- "Pagan Poetry" – Vespertine (for Harpsichord)
- "Pleasure Is All Mine" – Medúlla (for Organ)
- "Pneumonia" – Volta (for Piano or Organ)
- "Stonemilker" – Vulnicura (for Piano)
- "Stonemilker" – Vulnicura (for Piano - easy version)
- "Sun in My Mouth" – Vespertine (for Celeste)
- "Unravel" – Homogenic (for Organ)
- "Venus as a Boy" – Debut (for Harpsichord)
- "Vertebrae by Vertebrae" – Volta (for Piano)
- "Where Is the Line" – Medúlla (for Organ)
