= Eternal Dragonz =

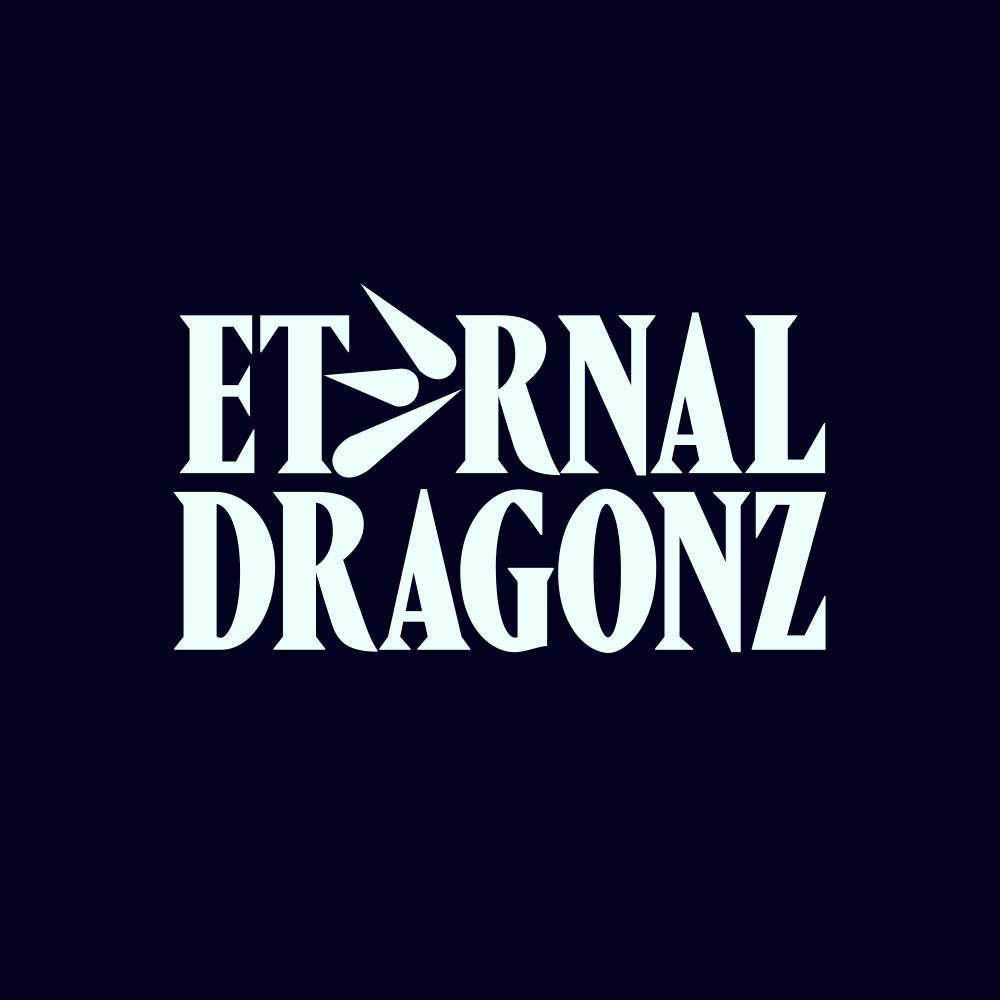
- Founded: 2015
- Founder: Lucy Chinen, Eric Hu, Justin Tam, Jason Wong, Jenny Yoo
- Distributor(s): Alpha Pup
- Genre: Electronic; Experimental; R&B
- Location: International
- Official website: www.eternaldragonz.bandcamp.com

Eternal Dragonz is an independent record label and artist collective, founded in Los Angeles in 2015 by Lucy Chinen, Eric Hu, Justin Tam (also known as Tzekin / V Kim), Jason Wong and Jenny Yoo with Angela Lin joining in 2017. It has released music and visual projects from Andrew Thomas Huang, Organ Tapes, x/o, Tzekin, Scintii, Le Makeup and FOTAN LAIKI.

== History ==
Originally, the collective came together to explore the work of artists of East, South and South East Asian artists across the English-speaking diaspora in the United States and Australia. The group has since grown to represent and work with artists across Asia and pair Asians artists working between Asia and those working in the west.

Many of the group’s early projects engaged issues of diaspora identity, such as participating in the art exhibition 'In Search of Miss Ruthless' at Para Site, Hong Kong, the short film ‘Fire Cock’ by visual artist Andrew Thomas Huang with a soundtrack by musician Organ Tapes, the bootleg compilations Karaoke Vol. 1 and Karaoke Vol. 2, which remixes popular Asian karaoke songs, and a “micro-grant” from online magazine Rhizome (organization) to document early Chinese-American net imagery.

The collective host a monthly online radio show on the Mexico-based station Internet Public Radio. The show was previously aired monthly on London online radio station Radar Radio.

== See also ==
- List of record labels
- List of electronic music record labels
