= Andrew Melchior =

British-German creative technologist and producer

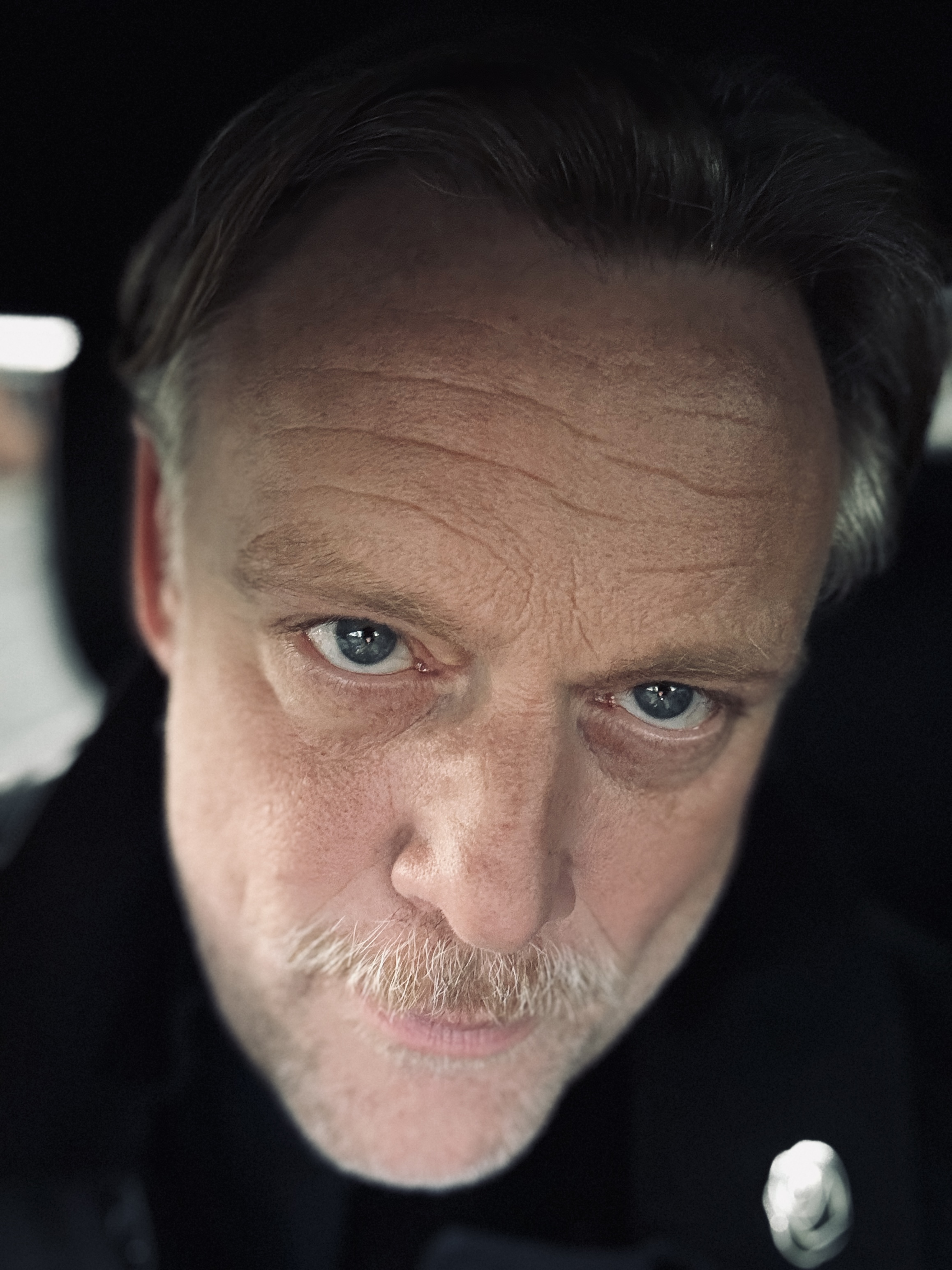
- Melchior in 2024
- Born: April 4, 1972 (age 53); Wiesbaden, West Germany
- Occupation(s): Artist and producer

Andrew Melchior (born 4 April 1972, Wiesbaden, West Germany) is a British-German artist, creative technologist and producer who has worked extensively with Björk, and is chief technical officer of the band Massive Attack. He was named as one of Creative Review's "Creative Leaders 50" in 2017.

== Career ==
His early career was spent at EMI and, in 1998, helped David Bowie set up the ISP, BowieNet, and initiated the first partnership between a mobile phone manufacturer and a recording artist, where Bowie's music and images were pre-loaded on a device. He managed the British band Elbow in their nascent years, playing on their song Powder Blue.

=== Work with Timothy Morton ===
In August 2024, he released his first single 'Come Fast From The Dark / FRB180916.J0158+65' in a collaboration with the philosopher and ecologist Timothy Morton. The A and B side both feature the first sonification ever created of an 8 billion year old Fast Radio Burst, which he made in a collaboration with MIT and the CHIME Radio Telescope.

=== Work for Björk ===
In 2014, he began work as technical advisor for Björk’s career retrospective and her “immersive” virtual reality exhibition Björk Digital, working with the artist and her label, One Little Indian, to translate Björk's music into a virtual space. The exhibition debuted at Carriageworks in Sydney, Australia and has toured the world for over three years. He is the producer of her first VR single 'Stonemilker' which was premiered as MOMA's first ever VR exhibit in April 2015 and released for iOS on the App Store in December of that year in addition to the 2019 Vulnicura VR album, an integrated app version of the Björk Digital VR content from her Vulnicura album.

=== Work for Massive Attack ===
In 2016 he began a series of projects for the Bristol-based band Massive Attack, beginning with Fantom, an app that created unique interactive remixes of the band's new release Ritual Spirit based on facial expressions, location, movement, and various other user inputs.

In celebration of the 20th anniversary of Massive Attack’s album Mezzanine he acted as producer on a number of projects for the band. These included Fantom Mezzanine, a new version of the Fantom app that created remixes of Mezzanine’s songs, and, in 2018, a "remastering" of the album where music data from the record was converted into synthetic DNA molecules mixed with paint, with the “album” then being released as a spray can. His recent work has included creation of convolutional neural networks based on del Naja's artworks, controlling robots to create new kinds of AI artworks.

In 2019, an endless version of the same album, generated by a custom neural network, was exhibited at the Barbican Centre in London.

=== Work for other artists ===
In 2019, he worked with American producers Seth Troxler and Phil Moffa on their Lost Souls of Saturn project to produce an augmented reality app which contains "a constantly evolving portal connected to a real-life object," which, when viewed via the app, reveals exclusive music and interactivity.
