= Andrew Thomas Huang =

American visual artist and film director

- Born: 1984; Los Angeles, California, U.S.
- Education: University of Southern California
- Occupations: Filmmaker, artist
- Website: andrewthomashuang.com

Andrew Thomas Huang (born 1984) is an American visual artist and film director known for his music videos for artists Björk, FKA twigs and Atoms for Peace. In 2019, Huang was nominated for a Grammy for his music video for FKA twigs, "Cellophane." He is the grandson of the Chinese scholar and libertarian socialist activist Huang Wenshan.

== Early life ==
Huang grew up in a Christian household, which heavily influenced his vulnerability on open queer expression and self-identity. He cites his religious upbringing as a motive for investigating spirituality in tandem with personal and sexual experiences.

He first began drawing and creating puppets from a young age, which sparked his interest in the arts.

Huang's family is Toisanese, and his grandfather immigrated to the U.S. after World War II. His mother was born in Los Angeles and his father was born in Hong Kong but immigrated to New York as an infant. He identifies as queer.

== Career ==
Huang graduated with a degree in Fine Art and Animation from the University of Southern California.

In 2005, Huang's short film "Doll Face" gained hundreds of thousands of views of YouTube, launching his career. Following the success of the video, Huang was invited to the Google Creator Summit.

His films and videos have been commissioned by and exhibited at The Museum of Modern Art, NYC; MoMA PS1; The Sydney Opera House, Sydney; The Pacific Asia Museum; The Somerset House; and the Museum of Contemporary Art, Los Angeles.

Huang has collaborated with the Bjork many times after catching the artist's attention through "Solipsist", a video uploaded on Vimeo. He collaborated with her to creatively direct her immersive VR exhibition Bjork Digital. This also catalyzed him to start working on music videos for various well known artists.

With his strength in world-building, Huang continues his foray into narrative with his first feature film Tiger Girl which has received support from Sundance and Film Independent. His narrative short "Kiss of the Rabbit God" premiered at Tribeca Film Festival 2019. "Kiss of the Rabbit God" was also his first film that addressed his Asian and queer identity.

In 2025, he began working "The Deer of Nine Colors", a Buddhist sci-fi film that is set to premiere at the Thailand Biennale.

== Themes and Style ==
Huang mainly mixes puppetry, visual effects, and animation to achieve his film aesthetics. For photography and exhibitions, he has used 3D to mock his prosthetics and brought them to life through sculpture.

His work mainly touches upon themes of the Chinese-American and queer experience using inspiration from Asian mythology, animism, and futurism. Weaving in fantastical elements, Huang frequently references Chinese deities and spiritual iconography in his art.

== Videography ==
=== Music videos ===
- Björk - "Mutual Core" (2012)
- Atoms for Peace - "Before Your Very Eyes..." (2013)
- Sigur Rós - "Brennisteinn" (2013)
- Björk - "Black Lake" (2015)
- Björk - "Stonemilker" (2015)
- Björk - "The Gate" (2017)
- Kelela - "LMK" (2017)
- Perfume Genius - "Slip Away" (2017)
- serpentwithfeet - "bless ur heart" (2018)
- FKA Twigs - "Cellophane" (2019)
- Björk - "Ancestress" (2022)
- Eartheater - "Crushing" (2023)
- Sasami - "Honey Crash" (2024)
- Yaeji - "Pondeggi" (2025)
- Katseye - "Gabriela" (2025)

=== Short films ===
- Doll Face (2005)
- Solipsist (2012)
- Interstice (2016)
- Flesh Nest (2017)
- Kiss of the Rabbit God (2019)
- Lily Chan and The Doom Girls (2020)
- Tiger Girl (2020)
- The Deer of Nine Colors (2025)

== Awards ==
- Nominee at Annecy International Animated Film Festival for Doll Face (2006)
- Winner of "Best SciFi Super Short Film" at Shriekfast (2009)
- Winner of "Best Film - Super Short" at Shriekfast (2009)
- Nominee for "Best Music Video" at Grammy's for "Cellophane" by FKA twigs (2020)
