= Björk Digital =

Virtual reality exhibit by Björk

- Promotional poster for the exhibition
- Date: June 4, 2016 – March 13, 2020
- Location: Oceania; Asia; Europe; North America; South America
- Type: virtual reality exhibition
- Theme: Vulnicura (2015); Biophilia (2011); Björk videography

Björk Digital was an "immersive" virtual reality exhibition by Icelandic musician Björk featuring 360-degree VR music videos from her eighth studio album, Vulnicura. The exhibit debuted at Carriageworks in Sydney, Australia as part of Vivid Sydney on June 4, 2016 and has traveled across the globe. Originally announced as an 18 month tour the exhibit ran until 2020, where it was last presented at the Centro Cultural Banco do Brasil of Rio de Janeiro, Brazil.

Björk has promoted the traveling exhibit with a series of DJ sets and intimate strings-only concerts during her Vulnicura tour, premiering at London's famous Royal Albert Hall on 21 September 2016. Her debut at the Walt Disney Concert Hall, with the Los Angeles Philharmonic Orchestra, took place on 30 May 2017.

The virtual reality videos premiered during the exhibition went on to form Vulnicura VR, which was released on Steam for Oculus Rift, Valve Index, HTC Vive on September 6, 2019.

== Background and development ==
Björk first began experimenting with virtual reality technology in 2014 when she and director Andrew Thomas Huang made "Stonemilker", the first song from the singer's critically acclaimed 2015 album Vulnicura. "I feel the chronological narrative of the album is ideal for the private circus virtual reality is," Björk said, calling VR, "a theatre able to capture the emotional landscape of (Vulnicura)."

90 Samsung Gear VR headsets were utilized for Björk Digital, and the VR project was ported to 60 HTC Vive "for a more immersive experience that comes with full room tracking." The experience was developed by her label One Little Independent Records in association with 3rd Space Agency and Manchester International Festival.

On 17 March 2016 Björk Digital was announced as one of the headlining events at Vivid Sydney 2016, an annual music and arts festival in Sydney, Australia. In addition, Vivid Sydney announced that Björk herself would DJ the opening night party of the VR exhibit on 3 June 2016. Tickets to the opening night DJ set quickly sold out, leading to a second DJ set being added for the following day.

A "work in progress", Björk Digital premiered, free of charge, to Vivid Sydney attendees at Carriageworks with four virtual reality music videos. Carried over from 2015's Museum of Modern Art Björk retrospective was the MoMA commissioned "Black Lake" video installation. Another previously available VR experience, "Stonemilker", was also on display. Two VR music videos premiered at Carriageworks: "Mouth Mantra," which had its 2D debut at the end of 2015, and "Notget" though in an unfinished form. The final "Notget" video would not be complete until September 2016.

Björk Digital borrows additional elements from the 2015 Björk retrospective, specifically the "Cinema" room showcasing the majority of the singer's music videos from 1993-2015 in HD and the "Biophilia" room with several touchscreen devices loaded with the apps from Björk's 2011 album, Biophilia. Unlike MoMA's show, however, the innovative and unique instruments created and utilized for Biophilia were not on display.

Björk Digital ran in Sydney from 4 June 2016 to 18 June 2016 before making its second stop in Tokyo, Japan at Miraikan, which previously hosted Björk's Biophilia Tokyo residency in 2013. No new VR videos were added though Björk again played an opening night DJ set on 29 June, with an encore set the following night. Björk Digital ran in Tokyo from 29 June 2016 to 18 July 2016. During the Miraikan residency, Björk made history by featuring in the world's first ever virtual reality live stream, broadcast on YouTube. She gave a live performance of Vulnicura's final song, "Quicksand", and the footage was later incorporated into the "Quicksand" VR experience which debuted months later.

The next stop for Björk Digital was London, England. News of the VR exhibit's arrival in Europe was eclipsed by the announcement of a special acoustic, strings-only concert at the Royal Albert Hall. Tickets quickly sold out, prompting a second acoustic concert at the Eventim Apollo in Hammersmith.

Björk Digital opened at the Somerset House in London on 1 September 2016 and ran until 23 October 2016. Björk made broadcast history by streaming herself as her virtual reality avatar into the press interview using the latest real time technology from Unity and Autodesk, hosted by director of Somerset House Jonathan Reekie John Leah was appointed Technical Director of Björk Digital and tasked with turning the show into the largest touring virtual reality roadshow in the world.

The final version of "Notget" premiered at Somerset House and during the opening night party VIP guests were given the opportunity to see the work-in-progress version of the "Family" VR experience. Björk made her debut at the Royal Albert Hall on 21 September 2016. Her performance earned rave reviews, with The Telegraph writing, "The tension between the rawness of the emotion, the alluring beauty of the string arrangements and the formal elegance of the classical presentation was utterly hypnotic." The Hammersmith show took place a few days later, on 24 September and was equally well received.

Björk Digital next traveled to Montreal, Canada for the Red Bull Music Academy festival where two additional VR videos were unveiled: "Quicksand" and "Family", the latter having been co-commissioned by the Red Bull Music Academy. Björk did not perform live in Montreal but she gave two DJ sets during the middle of the exhibit's run. Björk Digital opened in Montreal on 15 October 2016 and ran until 12 November.

Björk next took the VR exhibit to her native Iceland where she also announced two acoustic concerts to be held at Harpa. The first of these concerts, on 5 November 2016, was part of the Iceland Airwaves festival. Björk Digital ran from 2 November to 30 December 2016. Björk Digital made its North American debut in Houston, Texas during the Day for Night festival from 16–18 December 2016. Björk DJ'd on the 16th and 18th.

After a few months' hiatus, Björk Digital made its debut in Mexico on 21 March 2017. Björk held another acoustic concert at Mexico City's 10,000 seat Auditorio Nacional on 29 March. Björk played a second date in Mexico, this time in Toluca, on 2 April 2017 as part of the Ceremonia Festival. DJ and Vulnicura co-producer Arca joined Björk on stage for a strings-and-beats concert similar to her 2015 Vulnicura tour sets. Ceremonia was almost cancelled due to poor weather but was pushed back a day in a scaled back form. Björk Digital ran in Mexico City at the Fotomuseo Cuatro Caminos until 7 May 2017.

On 6 March 2017 it was announced that Björk would bring her VR exhibit to Los Angeles with a special debut performance at the Walt Disney Concert Hall scheduled for 30 May 2017, where the singer announced on stage that it would be her final Vulnicura concert. Björk Digital played at the Magic Box at the Reef in Downtown LA from 19 May to 4 June 2017. Her long-awaited songbook, 34 Scores for Piano, Organ, Harpsichord and Celeste, Björk's first ever collection of sheet music for her songs, was available early exclusively at the LA Björk Digital gift shop several weeks ahead of its official release date.

One month after its time in Los Angeles, Björk Digital traveled to Barcelona for the 2017 Sónar Festival, where the singer celebrated the opening night with a 4-hour DJ set at Fira Montjuïc's SonarHall stage. The VR show is expected to run from 14 July to 24 September 2017 at Barcelona's Centre for Contemporary Culture. Additionally, Björk also gave a talk at Sónar + D, a congress of digital culture and creative technologies, which in 2017 will focus on the latest advances in artificial intelligence and virtual reality applied to the arts.

On 19 September 2017, Björk Digital had its official opening in Russia, at the 7th Moscow International Biennale of Contemporary Art. The show ran for four months and was housed at the New Tretyakov Gallery. Björk Digital played alongside work from American artist Matthew Barney, whose breakup with Björk is the focus of much of the material from Vulnicura.

On 20 September 2017, Björk Digital played at the 2017 Ciudad Emergente festival in Buenos Aires, Argentina for four days and then continued in the city until the 30 December. It ran alongside the Michel Gondry exhibition Usina de Peliculas Amateurs. Three days later, Björk Digital continued its South America run as part of the Colombia 4.0 festival in the capital city of Bogotá. The show was free to the public. The VR show then travelled to Poznań, Poland for the 11th annual Arts & Fashion Forum. It ran from 3 October to 31 October 2017.

Björk Digital returned to Mexico City, this time at the Centro Nacional de les Artes, on 22 March 2018 and played until 24 June the same year.

On 23 January 2019, Björk Digital was announced to run at the Museu da Imagem e do Som in São Paulo, Brazil. The show ran 18 June - 18 August 2019 and is the first stop for the traveling VR exhibit in a year. It was then confirmed to be presented in the Centro Cultural Banco do Brasil (CCBB) of Brasília, Rio de Janeiro and Belo Horizonte. While it was running at the CCBB of Rio de Janeiro, the museum closed due to the COVID-19 pandemic. The remaining dates of the exhibition were cancelled.

On October 5, 2020, a digital version of the exhibition was made available online, accompanied by an exhibition catalogue, audioguides and Instagram filters created by James Merry inspired by Björk's looks in "Notget", Utopia and Cornucopia.

== Vulnicura Virtual Reality Album ==
On 24 September 2018, Music Week published an interview with Andrew Melchior, technical adviser on Björk Digital, where he said that the full Vulnicura VR album will be out before Christmas 2018 via One Little Indian Records and will be available across all VR platforms but the release did not materialize in 2018. Nearly a year later on 14 August 2019, while thanking MIS San Paulo for hosting Björk Digital's first run in Brazil, Björk wrote that those who have not had a chance to experience the VR exhibit can look forward to the upcoming Vulnicura VR app. The VR album was released on September 6, 2019.

== Exhibition dates ==
Dates	City	Country	Venue
June 4 – 18, 2016 (Note: Part of Vivid Sydney.)	Sydney	Australia	Carriageworks
June 29 – July 18, 2016 (Note: Part of the VR in Music – 18 Days Experiment exhibition.)	Tokyo	Japan	Miraikan
September 1 – October 23, 2016	London	England	Somerset House
October 15 – November 12, 2016 (Note: Part of Red Bull Music Academy.)	Montreal	Canada	PHI Centre
November 2 – December 30, 2016 (Note: Part of Iceland Airwaves.)	Reykjavík	Iceland	Harpa
December 16 – 18, 2016 (Note: Part of Day for Night.)	Houston	United States	Barbara Jordan Post Office
March 21 – May 7, 2017 (Note: Part of the WARP11 celebrations.)	Mexico City	Mexico	Foto Museo Cuatro Caminos
May 19 – June 4, 2017 (Note: Special addition to the Los Angeles Philharmonic's Reykjavík Festival.)	Los Angeles	United States	Magic Box at the Reef
July 14 – September 24, 2017 (Note: Part of Sónar.)	Barcelona	Spain	Centre de Cultura Contemporània de Barcelona
September 19, 2017 – January 12, 2018 (Note: Part of Moscow Biennale.)	Moscow	Russia	New Tretyakov Gallery
September 20 – 24, 2017 (Note: Part of the Ciudad Emergente festival.)	Buenos Aires	Argentina	Usina del Arte
September 23 – October 8, 2017 (Note: Part of the Colombia 4.0: Donde el mundo digital conecta festival.)	Bogotá	Colombia	Corferias
October 3 – 31, 2017 (Note: Part of the Arts & Fashion Forum.)	Poznań	Poland	Stary Browar
March 22 – August 15, 2018	Mexico City	Mexico	Centro Nacional de les Artes
June 18 – August 18, 2019	São Paulo	Brazil	Museu da Imagem e do Som
December 3, 2019 – February 9, 2020	Brasília	Brazil	Centro Cultural Banco do Brasil
March 11 – 13, 2020 (Note: The exhibition was scheduled to run until May 18, 2020, but on March 13 the CCBB closed due to COVID-19 pandemic. The subsequent stop in Belo Horizonte, where it was planned to run from June 10 to August 28, 2020, was cancelled.)	Rio de Janeiro	Brazil	Centro Cultural Banco do Brasil

== See also ==
- 2016 in art
