= Black Lake (song) =

- Bloom remix artwork

Song by Björk

from the album Vulnicura
- Released: 20 January 2015
- Studio: Baltic Place (London); Black Saloon Studios (London); Sundlaugin (Mosfellsbær)
- Genre: Electronic; avant-garde
- Length: 10:08
- Label: One Little Indian
- Songwriter: Björk
- Producers: Björk; Arca

Music video
- "Black Lake" on YouTube

"Black Lake" is a song by Icelandic musician Björk for her eighth studio album, Vulnicura (2015). At ten minutes and eight seconds, it is the longest song to appear on one of her studio albums. Written by Björk in the aftermath of her separation from contemporary artist Matthew Barney, the lyrics of "Black Lake" detail her heartbreak, anger, and attempts to forgive Barney — her emotions grow as each verse progresses in time, leading up to the final lines describing her "return home". The track was released alongside the rest of the album on 20 January 2015, by One Little Indian Records. Featuring additional production and programming by Arca, mixing by The Haxan Cloak, string and vocal arrangements by Björk, and a four-person group of cellists, "Black Lake" consolidates a dramatic sound with cellos and electronic beats that fade and reappear throughout the song.

"Black Lake" received critical acclaim for its lyrical depth, sonically tense and vivid beats, and lively pace, thus leading to several finding it to be the focal point of Vulnicura and a departure for Björk amidst a career that was often found to have previously been more detached thematically. Though its parent album did not feature any commercially released singles, "Black Lake" and the rest of the album were promoted via the Vulnicura tour and an exhibition at the Museum of Modern Art (MoMA).

The accompanying music video for "Black Lake" was directed by filmmaker Andrew Thomas Huang and represents Björk's sorrow and timeline of emotions as she travels through Iceland's barrens from a dark and volcanic chasm to a lush basin. Premiering at the aforementioned MoMA exhibit in March 2015, it was released to the public the following June. Since being featured at several Björk Digital exhibits, Björk has performed "Black Lake" on two of her tours, the most recent of which having been Björk Orkestral.

== Background ==
Following the end of promotion for her previous album Biophilia (2011) in 2012, Björk began recording Vulnicura the next year. In the midst of the album's recording, she separated from her then-partner, American contemporary artist Matthew Barney, and the months following this event would influence the conception of "Black Lake" and the album as a whole. The song's writing commenced three months after the separation, during a trip by Björk to Japan; she remarked in an interview with The Reykjavík Grapevine that she was "insanely jetlagged" when she began writing the lyrics, working in Icelandic time and often spending time in hot springs at a health retreat with her assistant and his boyfriend.

Björk produced "Black Lake" alongside Venezuelan recording artist Arca and programmed it with her and the song's mixer, British producer The Haxan Cloak. On its recording sessions, The Haxan Cloak stated that it was "important that the vocal remains very up-front", yet remaining "intimate rather than overpowering", while Arca added that she "cried like a baby" when she first heard "Black Lake" and "Family" in their demo versions. The Haxan Cloak mixed the song at the Baltic Place studio in London, and following several revisions of Björk's vocals at the Sundlaugin studio in Mosfellsbær, Iceland, the recording of "Black Lake" concluded by the beginning of spring in 2014. After not attending the British premiere of her Björk: Biophilia Live film on 7 October 2014 due to working on Vulnicura, Björk confirmed a 2015 release date for the album, and thus "Black Lake" as well.

== Composition ==
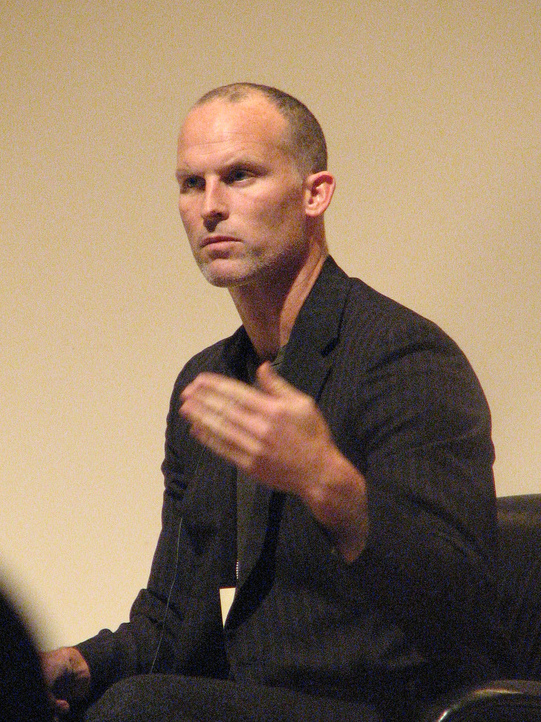
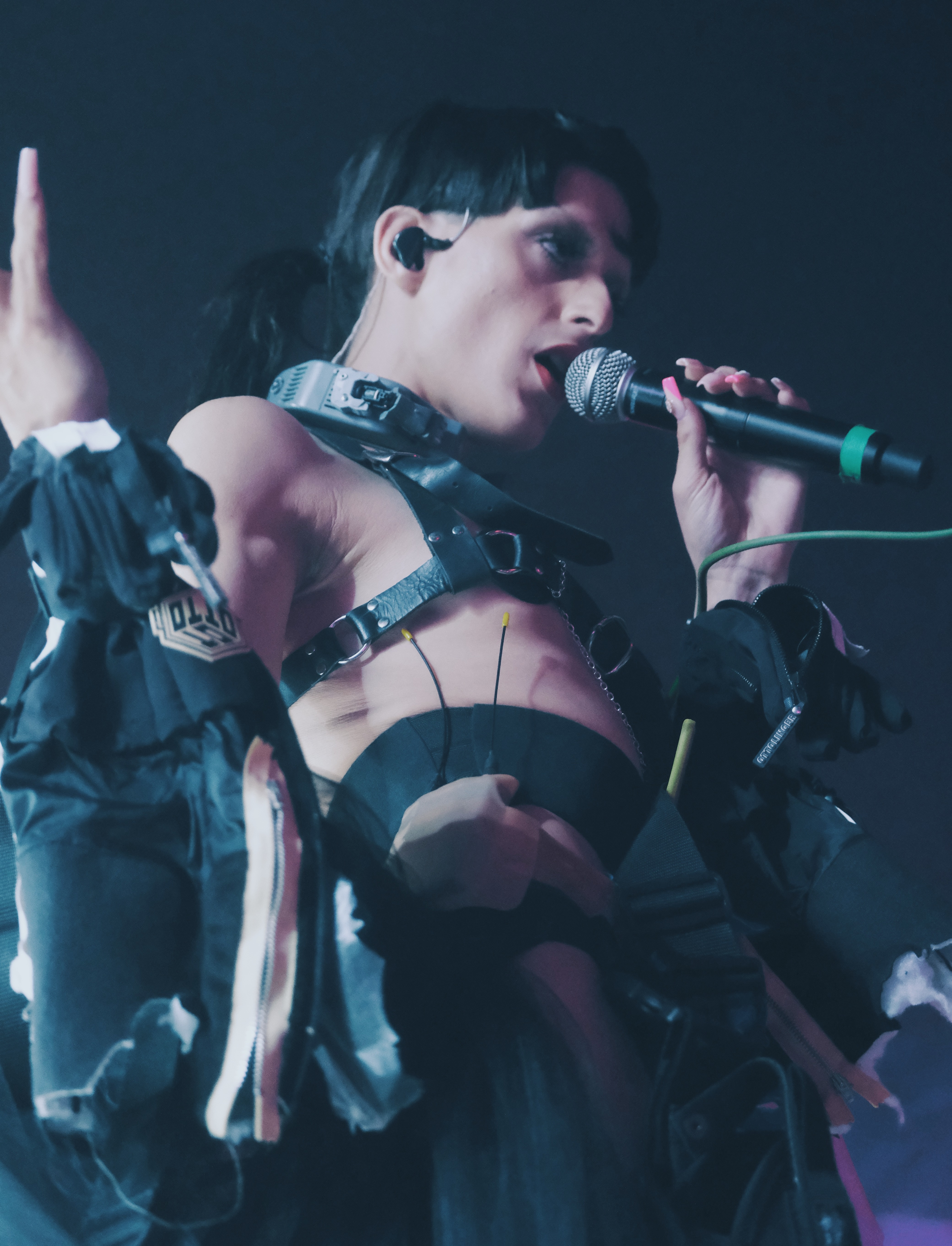
The song's subject, Matthew Barney (left, pictured in 2007), and co-producer, Arca (right, pictured in 2019).

The longest song of its parent electronic and avant-garde album Vulnicura, "Black Lake" has been described as having folk influences, as well as being a torch song. Its lyrical composition describes the aftermath of her separation from ex-partner Matthew Barney, with verses including lines such as "My soul torn apart / My spirit is broken" and "Family was always / Our sacred mutual mission / Which you abandoned". Björk herself has characterized the song as representing "forgiveness" and says she perceived the concept as the "only way to move forward emotionally" in the situation, also describing how each verse represents a different moment in time, in a similar fashion to her 1996 song "Possibly Maybe", though the song is broadly described in the liner notes as being "two months after". Several lyrics additionally have their origin in nature and the wilderness. The final verse of "Black Lake" describes her mental restoration whilst trilling her R's by comparing herself to a rocket "returning home" via entering the atmosphere, burning off "layer by layer".

Between each verse are fermatas that occasionally last up to nearly thirty seconds following a stiff suspension of the strings, which, according to Björk, represent "that one emotion when you’re stuck", adding that although difficult, "it’s also the only way to escape the pain, just going back and having another go, trying to make another verse." The song initially begins with only a simple string accompaniment before electronic beats seep in and out of the audio, in addition to a "pounding" and "gasping" rhythm appearing throughout its middle portion. It ends and fades out with a rehash of the more barren strings heard at the beginning.

== Release and promotion ==
Alongside the rest of Vulnicura, "Black Lake" was originally set to be released in March 2015 prior to the entire album leaking on 18 January of the same year. Due to the leak, the album was officially released early two days afterward, though no commercial singles were released. A music video for the song premiered at Björk's eponymous exhibit at the Museum of Modern Art (MoMA) in March 2015, and was released online three months later. On 1 October, a remix of "Black Lake" was released on SoundCloud featuring Northern Irish producer Bloom, preceding a physical release of it and three other remixes from the album on 20 November. The song was included on the set list for Björk's 2015 Vulnicura tour, which began on 7 March of the same year and featured a concert residency at New York City Center from 25 March–1 April. The traveling virtual reality exhibit Björk Digital additionally exhibited "Black Lake" in video format throughout its itinerary from 2016–2020. Her 2021–23 Björk Orkestral tour over six years later included the song on its set list as well.

== Critical reception ==
"Black Lake" was acclaimed by critics, with many deeming it a highlight of Vulnicura. Katherine St. Asaph and Jessica Hopper of Pitchfork considered the song to be the centerpiece of the album, referring to it as a "masterwork of balancing elements" and "a litany of incompatibilities over rising strings", respectively. The New York Times' Jon Pareles additionally stated that the song's "long-sustained chords" evoked "stretches of unbearable solitude", and that "Black Lake" was "harrowing and deliberate", as well as the "bleakest, bravest song" on the album. Will Hermes of Rolling Stone praised the "knife-twist" lyricism of "Black Lake", and opined that it was Vulnicura's "most devastating number" as it unfolded "in slow-mo", while Jason Lipshutz of Billboard remarked that with the song, Björk let out "the fluid fury of a woman scorned." Vogue's Alex Frank found that the "descending strings and bubbling techno beats" of "Black Lake" could make one "imagine falling into a body of water as dark as a computer screen."

The Line of Best Fit's Robby Ritacco highlighted the song's "brooding tension" and praised it for "unleashing all five stages of grief in near unison", whereas Vox's Kelsey McKinney commended Arca's beats that she found to "sonically stab" throughout "Black Lake", alongside the following tracks "Family" and "Notget". Lindsay Zoladz of Vulture praised both how "stingingly precise" each verse was in its detail, given how Björk's character was typically "distant" and "eccentric", as well as how she perceived the song as "soaring heart-first into an explosive crescendo". Sam C. Mac of Slant Magazine found the song to be a "frigid pasture of Homogenic's glacial continent", its violinic sound "reminiscent of Mihály Víg’s hauntingly cyclical scores for Hungarian filmmaker Béla Tarr", and its 10-minute length "summoning the apocalyptic expansiveness of epics like The Turin Horse and Sátántangó."

== Music video ==
=== Development and release ===
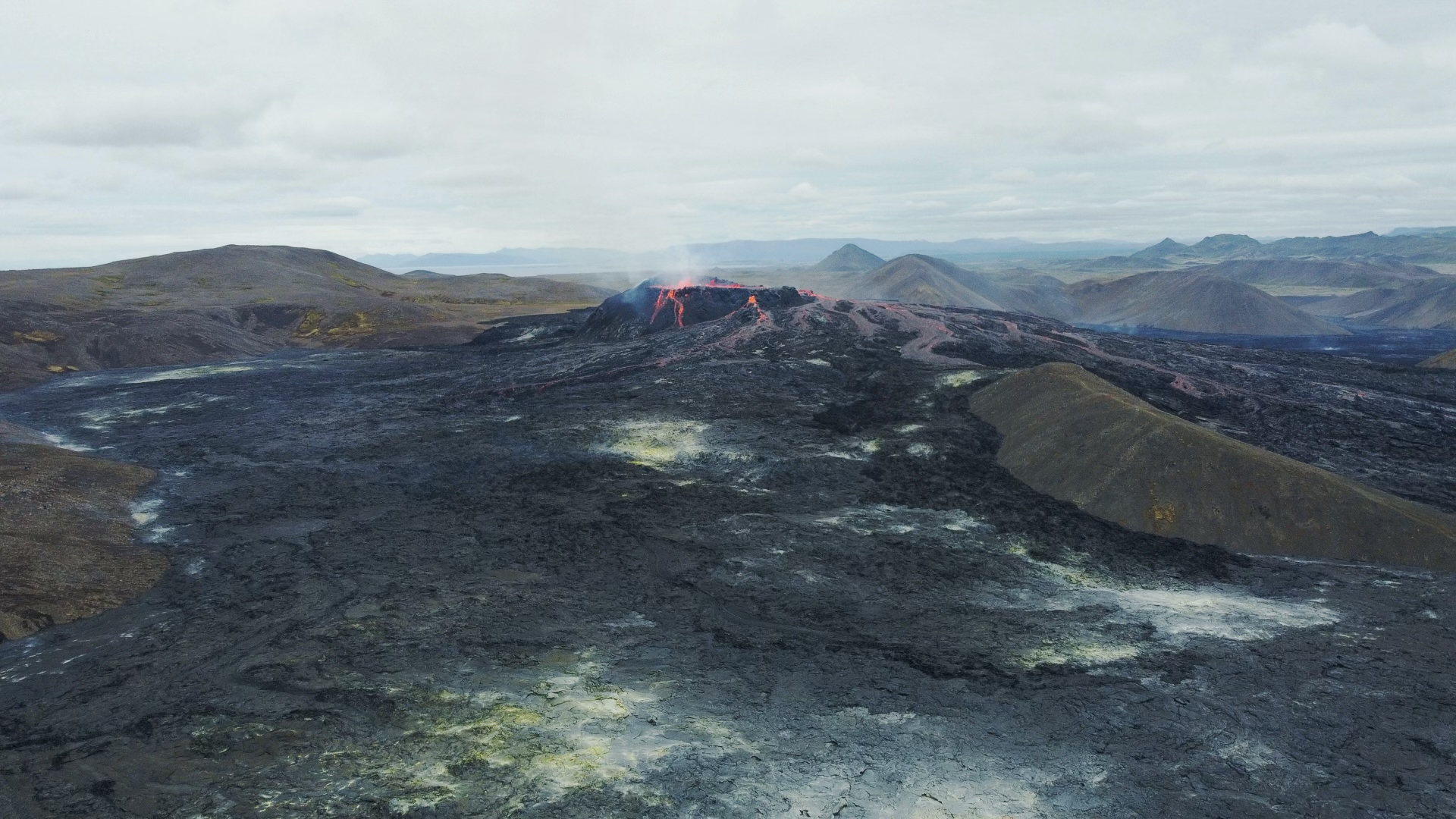
The video was shot at the Fagradalsfjall volcano (above), including the scene of blue lava erupting at its height (below).

The music video for "Black Lake" was directed by Andrew Thomas Huang, commissioned by the Museum of Modern Art (MoMA), and filmed in Iceland over three days in July 2014 at the Fagradalsfjall volcano (approximately half an hour from Björk's home), in the middle of the night. On the video's filming, Huang stated that "it was shot in a very traditional, Ingmar Bergman-stark way", and that the decision to tape it in a more traditional fashion was related to how the song was seen as being "about the death of her relationship and who she was." He additionally stated that some of his early conceptualizations for the video were similar to the video for "Mutual Core" (his first collaboration with Björk), in that they were both "designed to have all of these ‘dark fantasy’ moments." Sketches were made by both Björk and Huang to further illustrate the video's storyline in its developmental stage; to maintain high resolution for the volcanic ruptures from the first scenes of the video, drones were deployed to render images of the area approximately every two feet, and one of the final scenes featured an animated version of a petal-like cape (designed by Iris van Herpen) fraying into the air whilst Björk spun on a chair.

The video itself first depicts Björk singing in a crevice in the volcanic wilderness while moving in a sluggish, halfhearted manner. Following scenes of her tripping and falling, she regains the ability to walk upright and beats her fist towards the ground and her chest while bursts of blue lava erupt in the background and the beats of the song gain speed. The video then fades and restarts with her wearing a pink cape and new costume in broad daylight. A scene near the climax shows the petals of her cape unraveling into the air, and prior to the ending, the video returns to the daytime, where she walks into the middle of a foggier and more vegetated valley.

The video originally appeared exclusively in a theater at its respective MoMA exhibit, with dark cones covering the walls in a fashion intended to seem "cave-like" and reminiscent of the environment the video was shot in. The theater's walls and ceiling were additionally covered in a waveform pattern of the octaves and volume of "Black Lake" using Autodesk software. Leading up to its wider release on YouTube, a trailer for the video was published, displaying Björk lying in a dirt patch with her body split in half from right side to left, in addition to a wound laid on her chest and coral-like Icelandic fungi growing on the sides, both made with 3D printing.

=== Reception ===
The video was generally well-received by critics. Liv Siddall of Dazed said it was "the lovechild of a guild of some of the most talented and Björk-ready artists working today," while Rolling Stone's Jon Blistein called it "beautifully intense" and expanding of her "long line of striking music videos". Jamieson Cox of The Verge additionally remarked that the video made "for a draining, memorable viewing experience", and Stereogum's Gabriela Tully Claymore added that the lack of any mask on Björk's face affixed "an extra layer of exposure to the already raw song". The Atlantic's James Parker also considered the video to be "a dark and velvety blowhole for the world’s pain."

On the first screening of it at the prior MoMA exhibition, Kristin Iversen of Brooklyn Magazine found the video "utterly remarkable" and able to "transport me to a head space that felt light years away", whereas Fact's Claire Lobenfield found the video to be a "molten end" to touring the showing, in contrast to its "wide-eyed beginning". Ryu Spaeth of The Week perceived Björk's performance to be "refreshingly bare", as he found her emotions to be "distraught, pale, and regal", likening it to an "ice queen in exile," though Jason Farago of The Guardian found that the video gained nothing from "either its black-box projection or its two-channel format," additionally stating that he found it to be a work of melodrama. Vulture's Jerry Saltz found the work unfit for "museum or gallery standards" in a more negative review, panning the exhibition alongside it.

== Credits and personnel ==
Credits are adapted from the liner notes of Vulnicura.

- Björk – vocals, songwriter, producer, composer, programming, vocal arranging, string arranging
- Arca – producer, programming
- The Haxan Cloak – mixing, programming
- Mandy Parnell – mastering
- Bart Migal – engineering
- Chris Elms – engineering, recording
- Frank Arthur Blöndahl Cassata – engineering, recording
- Michael Pärt – recording supervisor
- U Strings – strings
- Júlía Mogensen – cello
- Margrét Árnadóttir – cello
- Sigurður Bjarki Gunnarsson – cello
- Sigurgeir Agnarsson – cello
