= Stonemilker =

- Patten rework artwork

Promotional single by Björk

from the album Vulnicura
- Released: 2015
- Genre: Baroque pop; avant-garde
- Length: 6:49
- Label: One Little Indian
- Songwriter: Björk
- Producer: Björk

Music video
- "Stonemilker" on YouTube

"Stonemilker" is a song recorded by Icelandic singer and musician Björk for her eighth studio album, Vulnicura, in 2015. It was written and produced by Björk with beats by Venezuelan musician Arca. "Stonemilker" is Vulnicura's opening track and the first of a six-part narrative that details the devastating end of Björk's relationship with American contemporary artist Matthew Barney. Björk wrote the lyrics on the same Icelandic beach where the innovative 360-degree music video was later shot.

"Stonemilker" was released as a promotional single in some territories in 2015 and received very limited airplay in a shortened radio edit. Unlike her previous studio albums, Vulnicura saw no commercially released singles. Despite this fact, several versions of the song have been released across various media.

== Background and composition ==
Vulnicura was leaked online on 17 January 2015, two months ahead of its then unspecified March 2015 release date. Two days later the album was rush released digitally on iTunes where it was accompanied by a digital booklet featuring not just lyrics and credits, but a narrative timeline accompanying the first 6 songs on the album, detailing to the month how long before or after the breakup each song was written. "Stonemilker", the first song on the album, was written "9 months before".

On 17 December 2015, Björk appeared on the podcast Song Exploder (Episode 60) where she revealed the meaning and backstory behind "Stonemilker": "It's about someone who's trying to get emotions out of another person…. I was walking on a beach, and I was kind of walking back and forth and the lyrics kind of came along kind of without me really editing them..."

She revealed that at one point the song had more complex, less obvious lyrics, but "it was really maybe a bit too clever for its own good but something in me said, 'No, don't touch it. It has to be, like, almost clumsy or naive.' That's sort of the strength and weakness of the song at the same time."

Björk composed the song entirely for strings, her first use of string instruments since 2001's Vespertine. She revealed how working on 2004's all-vocal album, Medúlla, refined her composing skills and helped her distribute the parts: "...I did the choir arrangements totally myself. Maybe it was easier for me, because I know the instrument much better – I've been singing since I was a kid. During Medúlla I sat with the choir working out the music, the harmonies, the Italian – you know, forte, piano, sforzando, that stuff."

"So I would sit down at a keyboard and just work out the chords. And then when I'm ready with the chord structure because I knew it would be for strings, I would take it to violins, violas, (and) cellos because I kind of wanted a lot of it to be in the strings. We actually saved it 'til last and I did several days of recording the strings. I had 30 players, and then I would do 2 sets of arrangements so basically there are, in theory, 60 because it needed that sort of panoramic feeling to have that sort of smooth, cream-like perfection."

She described how the music needed to feel cyclical, "that it could go on forever" as a way to create "equilibrium, like the person who's singing this song is showing some sort of harmony to someone as an example."

Vulnicura's co-producer and principle beat-maker Arca came in after the music and lyrics were already written. However, Björk realized that "Stonemilker" didn't need an extravagant beat. "It just had to be really supportive of the song, and almost acoustic like it's a symphony orchestra playing and the beat would come from the kettledrum or something... a very soft support which Alejandra provided." Though as revealed in the Song Exploder podcast via isolated snippets of the beats, there are soft, nearly inaudible electronic noises accompanying them, but they are nearly inaudible in the final mix.

"I think "Stonemilker" is one big question," Björk summarized. "You're asking someone a question… but you don't want to push too hard, trying… in the most harmonious way possible… to prove a point… Staying emotionally open (is) a choice… Do you want to try and then maybe fail half of the time and then succeed half of the time or whatever your odds are? Or is it your choice to not even try?"

== Remixes and alternate versions ==
While no singles were released to promote Vulnicura, Björk released several companion projects to the original studio album. However, the first alternate version of "Stonemilker" debuted during the Museum of Modern Art's 2015 Björk exhibition. The retrospective housed the "Black Lake" installation and Songlines exhibit in its main building while the MoMA PS1 showcased the "Stonemilker" VR music video for Oculus Rift. The innovative video featured a strings-only version of the song accompanied by gentle waves from the beach where the video was shot. When the VR video was released for Apple and Android devices later that year, it was revealed that the VR video version of "Stonemilker" was an exclusive mix different from the strings-only version that would later be released on Vulnicura Strings.

The second alternate version of "Stonemilker" debuted with the third and final wave of the Vulnicura Remix Series in October 2015. "Stonemilker" (The patten Rework) is the only official, traditional remix of "Stonemilker" and was released digitally and on limited edition translucent vinyl, limited to 1,000 copies worldwide.

6 November 2015 saw the release of Vulnicura Strings, an acoustic companion project to Vulnicura featuring strings-only interpretations of 8 of Vulnicura's 9 tracks. Björk revealed during the project's official announcement, "While I was working on Vulnicura, it became one of the most magical thing(s) both musically and spiritually to unite the electronics and the acoustic instruments in an almost romantic way: to prove they can coexist!!... But while working on it I felt somehow for the first time, this was an album that could take another version: a reveal, to simply have the acoustics stand on their own for the folks who wanna indulge even further into the wooden timeless side of this music. With no techno."

The Vulnicura Strings version of "Stonemilker" is a different acoustic mix than the one featured on the VR app. The Strings version features a more lush and fuller sounding orchestra and does not feature the crashing ocean sound effect.

The final officially released version of "Stonemilker" is found on Vulnicura Live, a collection of performances from Björk's 2015 Vulnicura tour.

Though not commercially released, a radio edit of "Stonemilker" exists and runs less than half the length of the original album version, combining the first half of the first verse with the second half of the second verse and the second chorus. The musical coda is severely truncated and fades out shortly after the chorus ends. It has been confirmed that the radio edit is official but it remains largely unheard.

== Critical reception ==
"Stonemilker" was universally acclaimed by music critics and is regarded as one of the finest tracks off Vulnicura. The Guardian noted its "high-drama string arrangements" and said, "the chorus is a kind of gorgeous sigh, with beautiful melodies frequently sitting alongside moments of real audacity." PopMatters called it "one of her most stunning creations, deftly straddling the line between the avant-garde and the immensely accessible, the direct and the obtuse" and said, "The lavish strings, provided by the ensemble U Strings, are a welcome reminder of her sublime orchestral arranging talents."

"Stonemilker" has also been called "tragic," and the "saddest song Björk has ever written," by Moze Halperin for Flavorwire. "It bears the weight of the potentiality of the black lake that will become her heart with a hopefulness that the rest of the album exposes as crushingly misguided: Björk here bravely makes dramatic irony of her own pain."

"Stonemilker" ranked 149th on Pitchfork's "200 Best Songs of the 2010s" list.

== Music video and "Stonemilker" app ==
The music video for "Stonemilker" was shot on the same Icelandic beach where Björk originally wrote the song's lyrics and was directed by Andrew Thomas Huang, who previously directed Björk's 2012 music video "Mutual Core" in addition to directing the "Black Lake" video installation that premiered at the Museum of Modern Art's Björk retrospective in March 2015.

"Stonemilker" was conceived of and shot in an afternoon using 360-degree cameras to create one of the first virtual reality music videos by a major contemporary recording artist. Björk and Huang settled on 360-degree video for its "potential for intimacy" but the video's panoramic view forced the film crew to hide behind rocks for the several takes it took to capture the performance.

The video was produced by Here Be Dragons while the special effects were created by Digital Domain, and it premiered at the MoMA PS1, MoMA's sister location, on 22 March as part of the museum's Bjork exhibit and was also briefly made available to customers of Rough Trade record shops in London (Rough Trade East) and Brooklyn, NY who purchased the physical album. The MoMA & Rough Trade experiences were created by Rewind and The New Chromantics for iPhone6 using the FreeFly VR headset. A GearVR version was created but never used.

The video features an exclusive strings-only mix of the song. Björk explained, "I had recorded the strings with a clip-on mike on each instrument. We have made a different mix where we have fanned this in an intimate circle around the listener. So as you watch the virtual reality headset it will be as if you are on that beach and with the 30 players sitting in a circle tightly around you." It was later released as a 360-degree YouTube video on 6 June 2015 featuring the original album mix.

The "Stonemilker" Virtual Reality App was made available to purchase on iOS devices on 21 December 2015 and later made available to Android users. The app was created by Third Space Agency, Rewind, and 2 Big Ears and retains both the 360-degree visual and auditory experience.

The video is currently touring the world as part of the Björk Digital exhibit.

== Personnel ==
Credits adapted from Vulnicura's liner notes.

- Björk – writer, composer, producer
- Arca – programming
- The Haxan Cloak – programming

== Charts ==
Chart (2015)	Peak position
Belgium (Ultratip Bubbling Under Flanders)	84
Iceland (RÚV)	8
