= Björk (exhibition) =

Art exhibition about the singer of the same name

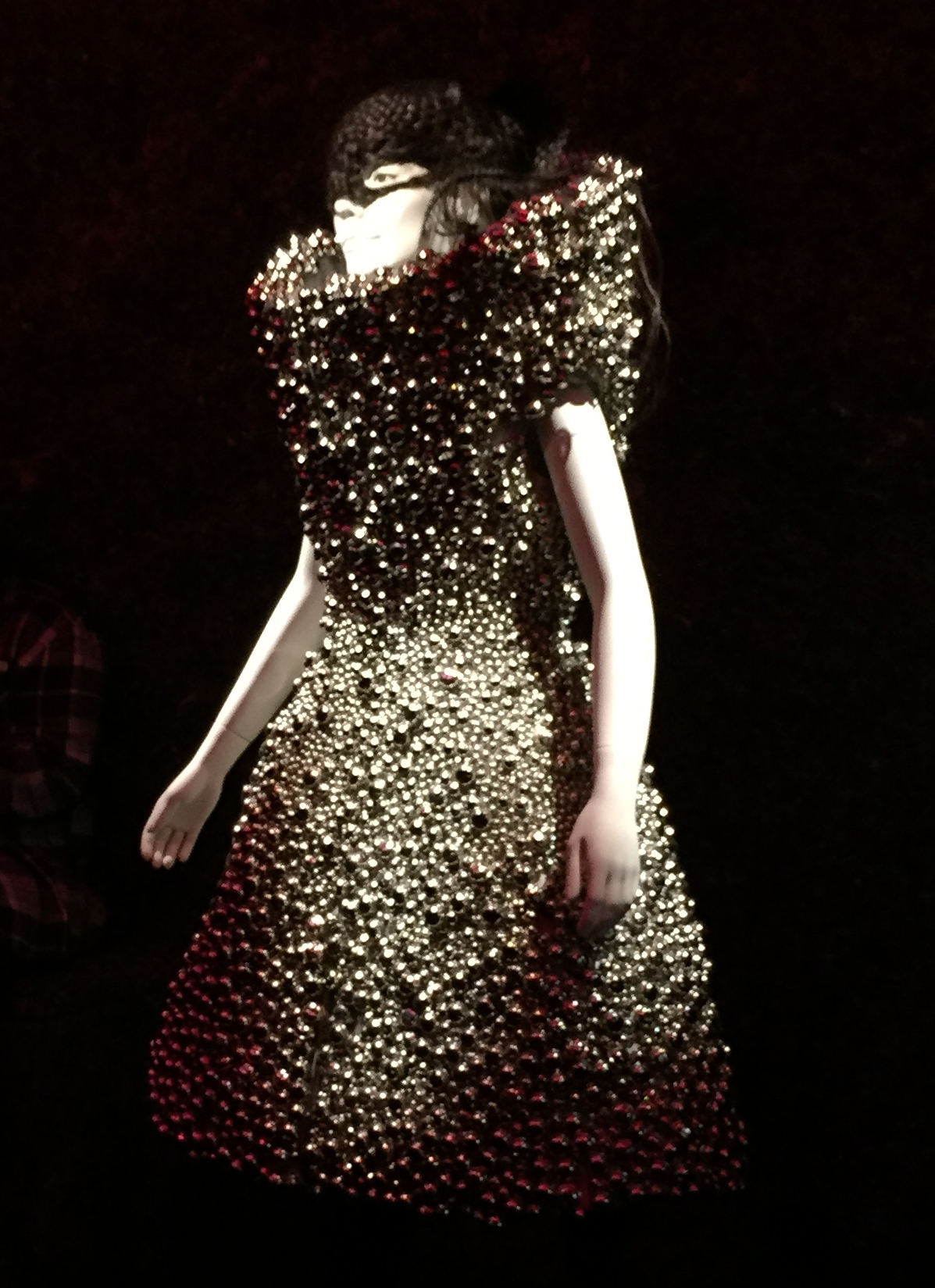
Alexander McQueen-designed bell dress from the music video for "Who Is It"

Björk was an exhibition at the Museum of Modern Art (MoMA) in New York City about the Icelandic singer of the same name. Exhibited at MoMA from March 8 to June 7, 2015, Björk was a "retrospective" showing comprising audio, video, fashion, instruments, and other objects pertaining to her career.

Björk received generally negative reviews from critics, many of whom labelled the exhibition as either unambitious, incomplete, or similar to other MoMA exhibitions.

== Background and development ==
On June 12, 2014, it was announced that the Biophilia apps were to be featured as part of the permanent collection of the Museum of Modern Art (MoMA) in New York City, thus becoming the first app to be part of the museum collection. A week later, the museum announced that a retrospective exhibition of the singer's work would take place beginning on March 8, 2015, and lasting until June 7, 2015.

== Description ==
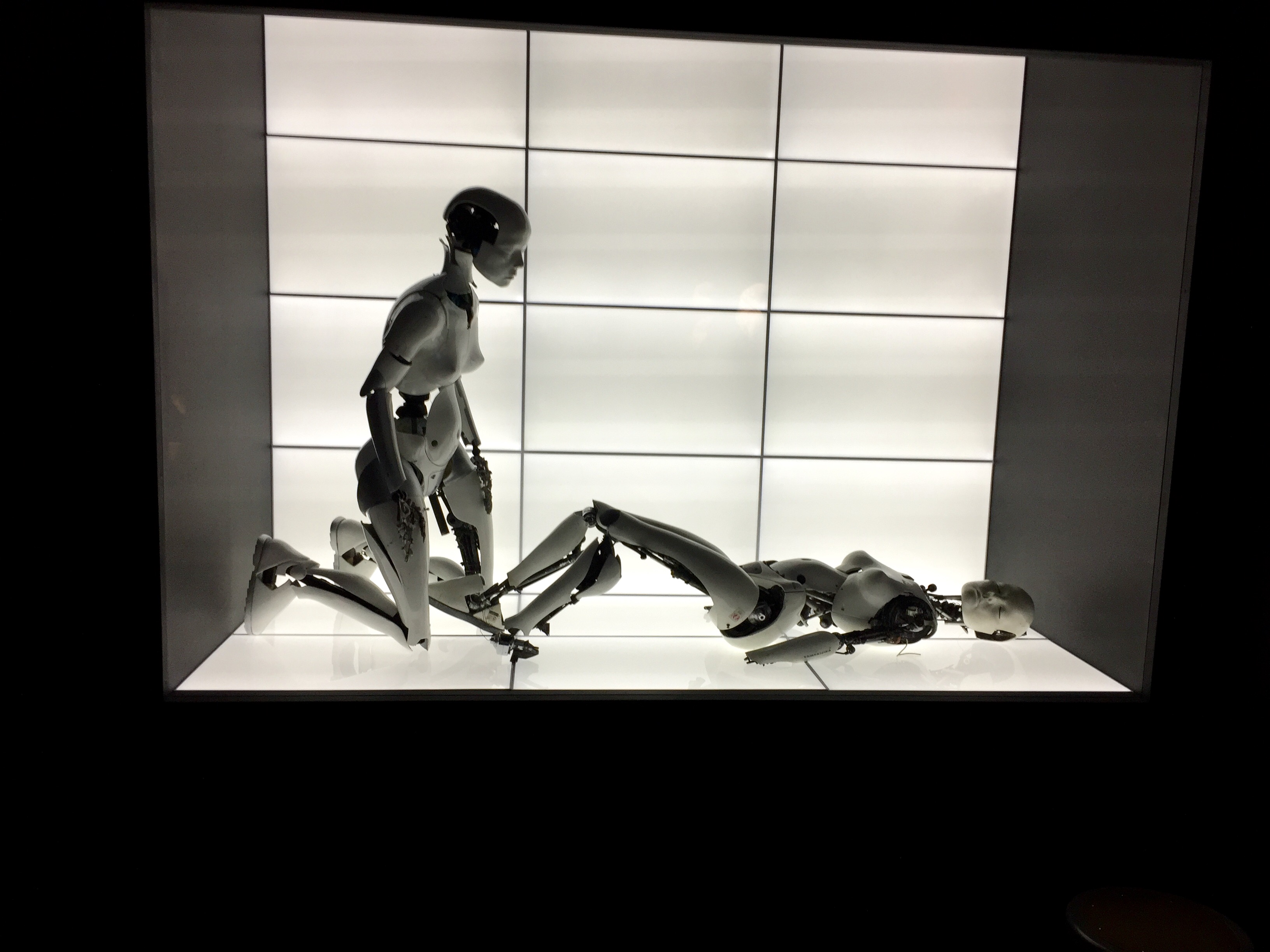
Replicas of the robots from the "All Is Full of Love" music video on display

Björk was curated by the director of MoMA PS1, Klaus Biesenbach, who commented on the exhibition: "Björk is an extraordinarily innovative artist whose contributions to contemporary music, video, film, fashion, and art have had a major impact on her generation worldwide, this highly experimental exhibition offers visitors a direct experience of her hugely collaborative body of work".

The exhibit incorporated a new commission from MoMA, which saw Björk reunited with award-winning video director Andrew Thomas Huang ("Mutual Core"), presenting the then-new music video for "Black Lake". In addition, elements from her previous seven studio albums (excluding her 1977 juvenilia work Björk) and her multiple collaborations with fashion designers, video directors, and photographers were presented as part of the mid-career "retrospective" titled "Songlines". Childhood friend of Björk, theatrical director, and actress Margrét Vilhjálmsdóttir and lyrical collaborator and Icelandic poet Sjón contributed to an audio narrative for visitors to the exhibit.

== Critical reception ==
Björk received generally negative reviews from critics. Roberta Smith of The New York Times stated that the exhibition "[lacked] the ambition to do [Björk's] ambition justice" and that it stood as an overt sign "of the museum’s urge to be all things to all people, its disdain for its core audience, its frequent curatorial slackness and its indifference to the handling of crowds and the needs of its visitors." In a mixed-to-negative review, The Guardian's Jason Farago remarked that Björk was "one part Rock and Roll Hall of Fame exercise, one part science lab, one part synesthesia experiment, one part Madame Tussaud’s [sic] parody – but [not] two parts anything", but additionally noted that the exhibition was still worth visiting to visualize how Björk "built a cooperative artistic practice that spanned media and registers, high and low, to unprecedented public effect."

Jerry Saltz of Vulture also negatively reviewed the show, stating that he found it to be a "discombobulated mess" and that it was "not yet up to museum or gallery standards." Ryu Spaeth of The Week additionally stated that there wasn't "enough in [the] cramped, snaking rooms to hold your interest" for the 40-minute audio tour, while ARTnews' M. H. Miller opined that the exhibition was "hardly a retrospective—it’s starfucking, something increasingly familiar at MoMA, and a failure even at that." In a more positive review, Claire Lobenfield of Fact stated that Björk was meant to be about "processing", and that the show worked best if allowing oneself to process as well. Lobenfield additionally observed that when touring the exhibition from the audio tour for "Songlines" to the screening room for the "Black Lake" music video, "a romance from its wide-eyed beginning to its molten end fully comes together." Colleen Nika of Dazed further noted that the exhibition seemed to be only the beginning of discussion over the singer's impact.

== See also ==
- 2015 in art
