= 1982 in Nordic music =

The following is a list of notable events and releases that happened in Nordic music in 1982.

== Events ==
- 24 April – At the 27th Eurovision Song Contest, held in the UK, the top-performing Scandinavian country is Sweden, which finishes in 8th place. Norway finish 12th, Denmark 17th and Finland 18th (with no points).
- 3 December – The most successful group of the 1970s, Sweden's ABBA, release their final original single before their break-up, "Under Attack".
- Unknown date – Norwegian synth-pop band A-Ha is formed in Oslo.

== Classical works ==
- Hans Abrahamsen – Nacht und Trompeten
- Aulis Sallinen – Shadows

== Hit singles ==
- ABBA
  - "The Day Before You Came" (#1 Finland; #3 Belgium, Netherlands; #4 Switzerland)
  - "Under Attack" (#2 Belgium; #5 Netherlands)
- Chips – "Dag efter dag" (#4 Sweden; #5 Norway)
- Freestyle – "Ögon som glittrar" (#3 Sweden)
- Gyllene Tider – "Sommartider" (#3 Norway; #6 Sweden; #12 Finland
- Laban – "Hvor ska' vi sove i nat" (#6 Denmark)
- Tomas Ledin – "Sommaren är kort" (#7 Sweden)
- Jahn Teigen & Anita Skorgan – "Adieu" (#3 Norway)
- Þeyr – "The Fourth Reich" (EP)

== Eurovision Song Contest ==
- Denmark in the Eurovision Song Contest 1982
- Finland in the Eurovision Song Contest 1982
- Norway in the Eurovision Song Contest 1982
- Sweden in the Eurovision Song Contest 1982

== Film and television music ==
- Asser Fagerström – Aidankaatajat eli heidän jälkeensä vedenpaisumus
- Jo Tore Bæverfjord & Hans Rotmo – Krypskyttere
- Rolf Sersam & Giuseppe Verdi – Den enfaldige mördaren

== Musical films ==
- Ebba the Movie (documentary), featuring Ebba Grön & Dag Vag
- Rokk í Reykjavík (documentary), featuring Tappi Tíkarrass, Einar Örn Benediktsson, Egó, Fræbbblarnir, and others.

== Births ==
- January – Yukimi Nagano, Swedish singer and songwriter (Little Dragon)
- 3 January – Chisu, Finnish singer-songwriter
- 5 January – Kristín Anna Valtýsdóttir, Icelandic musician
- 15 January – Ari Pulkkinen, Finnish pianist and composer, best known for his music on the Angry Birds series
- 31 January
  - Helena Paparizou, Greek-Swedish singer, winner of the Eurovision Song Contest 2005
- 26 May – Morten Breum, Danish DJ and music producer
- 23 June – Martin Rolinski, Swedish musical artist
- 28 July – Ágústa Eva Erlendsdóttir, Icelandic singer, known for portraying Silvía Night.
- 15 September – Sofia Jannok, Swedish musical artist
- 22 November – Steve Angello, Greek-Swedish DJ
- 30 November – Medina, Danish musician
- 27 December – Terji Skibenæs, Faroese guitarist (Týr)

== Deaths ==
- 16 January – Harald Agersnap, Danish classical musician, 92
- 26 May – Nanny Larsén-Todsen, Swedish operatic soprano, 97
- 12 August – Helvi Leiviskä, Finnish composer, 80
- 28 September – Ragnar Hasselgren, Swedish born singer, 78
- 11 October – Gösta Törner, Swedish jazz trumpeter and bandleader, 70
- 21 October – Radka Toneff, Norwegian jazz singer, 30 (suicide)

== See also ==
- 1982 in Denmark
- 1982 in Iceland
- 1982 in Norwegian music
- 1982 in Sweden
