= Þeyr =

Icelandic rock band

- Þeyr featuring in Rokk í Reykjavík

Background information
- Origin: Reykjavík, Iceland
- Genres: New wave, post-punk, punk rock
- Years active: 1980–1983, 2006
- Labels: Eskvímó, Fálkinn, Gramm, Mjöt, Shout, SG-Hljómplötur
- Past members: Magnús Guðmundsson; Guðlaugur Kristinn Óttarsson; Þorsteinn Magnússon; Hilmar Örn Agnarsson; Sigtryggur Baldursson; Elín Reynisdóttir; Jóhannes Helgason

Þeyr (Icelandic pronunciation: [ˈθeiːr̥]) was an Icelandic new wave band from the early 1980s.

== Origins ==
The origins of Þeyr date back to the late 1970s when singer Magnús Guðmundsson, bassist Hilmar Örn Agnarsson and Hilmar Örn Hilmarsson (drums and synthesizer) were playing in a garage band called Fellibylur (Hurricane). The band was expanded with vocalist Elín Reynisdóttir, who at the time was singing at a church choir, guitarist Jóhannes Helgason from a rock band called Piccolo, and drummer Sigtryggur Baldursson from Hattimas. They called themselves Frostrósir (Frostroses) and played rock music and some Icelandic songs at dancehalls in Reykjavík and its surroundings.

After a while they decided to change the band's name and came up with Þeyr, which was drawn from a poem by Skuggi and it means Wind or Thaw in old Icelandic. Þeyr is exactly pronounced as þeir, which means they (male gender).

== History ==
=== First release and internal changes ===
By 1979, they introduced two of their songs to Svavar Gests, owner of SG-Hljómplötur, who sent them to Sigurður Árnason, a record producer from Tóntækni, the studio of SG-Hljómplötur, and the recording sessions started in January 1980 but were interrupted in February when the band decided to take a long break to come back in September with new wave music. "There was a concert in Iceland with the group Clash which had a lot of effect on us, specially Magnús. That was the turning point as we started the new wave rock, and the band was taking a roller-coaster in music searching for something out of the ordinary", says Sigtryggur Baldursson.

The band also recorded other works which were not published, like a song to Hindin, a poem by Davíð Stefánsson, sung by Elín and Eiríkur Hauksson and with some backing vocals added by Magnús. Svavar Gests was reluctant to publish the record as he did not like the music nor even the cover design, however, his wife persuaded him to release it.

The album, titled Þagað í Hel, was heavily influenced by progressive rock, disco music and late 1970s pop. The pressing of the vinyl was flawed when it arrived in Iceland, and only about 500 copies were released in December 1980. Þagað í Hel has never reissued because a few years later, the masters and other recordings were lost in a fire at Tóntækni, making this record widely unavailable today. The only song to survive from the album was the opening track "En...", which resurfaced later on Nælur, a compilation album of Icelandic new wave bands released in 1998.

Right after this album, they were joined by guitarist and polytechnic engineer Guðlaugur Kristinn Óttarsson. They played together for a while, but Jóhannes withdrew from the band in order to finish with his aeronautical studies. Elín followed him and withdrew from the music scene to work at Impra.

Guitarist Þorsteinn Magnússon, from the band Eik joined the band and Magnús remained as the lead vocalist.

=== Starting anew ===
As time passed by and thanks to the final line-up, Þeyr developed an experimental rock, punk, heavy metal and pop style with preponderance of guitars and drums. Musical influences spanned over a wide range of seminal artists such as Joy Division, Holger Czukay, The Birthday Party, Killing Joke, Siouxsie and the Banshees, Nina Hagen, David Byrne, Yes, Genesis, Grateful Dead, and John McLaughlin.

On January 28, 1981 Þeyr played at Hótel Saga, a date referred to as the reincarnation of Þeyr, where free haircuts were offered to the audience during the break. The band started to be acclaimed not only for their stage performances, but also by their accessible and at the same time creative music. The band was strengthened with the management of Guðni Rúnar Agnarsson, who was the host of the radio show Áfangar, and Hilmar Örn Hilmarsson, who also collaborated with the lyrics, some art works and served as an influential figure whose interest on obscurantism was embodied in the lyrics.

=== Popularity and success beyond Iceland ===
The band's following release was a 7-inch vinyl called Life Transmission (also known as Útfrymi), which was released through their own label, Eskvímó in 1981. It contained two songs: the title song, which was the first work they sang in English, and "Heima er Bezt". Later, they collaborated on the soundtrack to Brennu-Njálssaga, a film about the Njáls saga which was directed by Friðrik Þór Friðriksson, toured Iceland and played along with Þursaflokkurinn and Baraflokkurinn in Akureyri. After these concerts, they went back to the recording studio and prepared Iður til Fóta, a 10-inch vinyl single which contained four tracks.

By December and after 140 hours of recording sessions in studio Hljóðriti, Þeyr released their second album, Mjötviður Mær, in which songs like "Iss", "Þeir" and "2999" were outstanding examples of their attempts to create a futuristic pop style with use of voice distortions, keyboards and additional rhythms. The track "Úlfur" stands out due to having a more angry style of singing and "Rúdolf", an antifascist rock song, became into one of the most popular songs. This album received good reviews by the critics who said it fulfilled the expectations.

When speaking about the LP, it's perhaps more correct to talk about "state of mind". These recordings are the product, or rather the preservation of the feelings and mental state of mind of the band for the last few months. And what months! We've verified that asceticism does indeed enrich the spirit, and the spirit is being recorded on a steel-thread which in turn will be put into vinyl which will be released as Þeyr's second LP in the middle of next month, God and a certain somebody in that company willing.

— Þeyr in an interview with Þjóðviljinn on October 11, 1981

By 1982, singer and keyboardist Jaz Coleman from Killing Joke had visited Iceland many times, and become an acquaintance of Þeyr. This resulted in an opportunity for the Icelandic band to travel to London in November where they were offered a support slot with The Cure on a six-month tour. However, Þeyr felt that they were not yet ready, and returned to Iceland to sign a record deal with label Shout instead. In the spring of 1982, As Above... was released. The album contains mixed versions of previous songs, as well as the new song "Killer Boogie" and "Rúdolf", which was misinterpreted and lead to accusations of nazism. After this, Þeyr went on with a series of gigs throughout Scandinavia and were featured on Friðriksson's documentary Rokk í Reykjavík, performing two songs: "Killer Boogie" and "Rúdolf", along many important bands like Purrkur Pillnikk and Tappi Tíkarrass among others.

Jaz Coleman decided to move to Iceland with guitarist Kenneth 'Geordie' Walker, with the ambition of resurrecting the Icelandic rock scene. While there, Coleman and Þeyr, with the exception of Magnússon, formed a new band originally called Iceland, but later named Niceland by Guðlaugur Óttarsson. After rehearsing for weeks Niceland was ready to record 5 songs in Hljóðriti in 1983, but two of them were never finished; the three songs recorded were: "Guess Again", "Catalyst" and "Take What’s Mine". But as Þeyr decided to write their own songs, Jaz moved away and joined guitarist Árni Kristjánsson and drummer Þórarinn Kristjánsson from the band Vonbrigði for a while, before returning to England to reestablish Killing Joke. The songs recorded by Niceland remain unpublished.

Magnússon returned to Þeyr, and the band toured Scandinavia. By this point, Guðni and Hilmar decided to leave the band's management, and were replaced by Guðmundur Sigurfreyr Jónason. With the tour, the band gained more popularity and even managed to appear on radio and television in Denmark, they also went to a studio and recorded a few songs which were released on the 12-inch EP The Fourth Reich, in memory of Wilhelm Reich whose books had been banned by the Nazi regime. The image cover was alleged Nazi incitation because it depicted Wilhelm Reich wearing a Nazi-styled armband and the British label Shout was obligated to change the cover. However, it should be said, that the armband shown on the cover contained the symbol of the orgone physics, which represented duality and its origins in unity, referred by Reich as functionalism. On The Fourth Reich the use of percussions and rhythmical efforts were far more important than in earlier works. In this respect, the song "Zen" was particularly important due to its marked rock style, but the album did not have the impact of earlier works because the music was less accessible. The Icelandic version of this EP was released by label Mjöt, which had been created by Magnús.

The band began to fall apart when Þorsteinn Magnússon left. He released a solo album Líf in 1982, under the name Stanya. The remaining four members continued playing together; however, the band broke up in June 1983. Soon after, a small EP was released through label Gramm, with the title Lunaire, which featured the title song as well as two other tracks recorded in Copenhagen. In 1992, Þeyr albums were about to be reissued by Smekkleysa, but the negotiations were abandoned. However, a CD titled Mjötviður til Fóta was released in 2001. This compilation featured tracks taken from Mjötviður Mær and Iður til Fóta and is currently the only CD released by Þeyr.

Þeyr's earlier releases have never been reissued since the masters are lost. Their original records have become rare collector's items, all of them currently out of public reach.

=== Þeyr thinking: in search of absolute truth ===
Þeyr wanted to cause a change on the Icelandic society and their means varied from straight messages to subliminal persuasion. The band worked with Zeitgeist to bring about those changes and several tools were employed, including experiments from guitar strings made to vibrate in the "atmosphere of Jupiter" to recording studios underwater. Guitarist Guðlaugur created all sort of devices aimed to affect the audience in a wide range of forms.

The Scriabin was one of them. It was named after Russian composer Alexander Scriabin. The music was used as organized sound. The Scriabin was programmed with a 13-note chord (some of them microtonal, for example, out of the ordinary 12-tone scale) and this chord could be displaced either above or below the range of human perception. The instrument would sound at an ultrasonic level before each concert, thus creating a subtle unity among the audience. A later Shout Records press release calls the Scriabin "The Fourier". It sums up:

If there is any word which might serve as a key to the philosophical and practical aims of Þeyr it is "symmetry". They combine their belief in an inherent structure behind the manifestation of matter with intense experimental fervour that aims at unravelling at least a few practical applications of this "divine proportion" that determines the extent and amplitude of our aesthetic experience [....] The second study deals with the harmonic build up of music, and this has led to a study of the Russian composer Alexander Scriabin (1872-1915) whose work aimed at breaking up all classical rules of harmonic composition and ultimately at the founding of a new music that would escape the straitjacket of the 12-tone scale [...] He further sought to unite sensations such as smell, sight and hearing into one, and some of his later works were interpreted in colour as well as sound. This fascinating study is being pursued by Þeyr whose concerts have been known to reek of exotic incense and to be lighted by a certain blending of root colours. Ultimately these things will be married under the one heading which forms their third study, FOURIER. The Fourier as they jokingly refer to it is basically a machine that is being worked upon by one of the bands members who has a background in theoretical mathematics, physics and electrical engineering. However it has through time of construction (several proto-types of its main parts have already been constructed and some already discarded in favour of new ideas currently being worked on) come to represent an entirely new approach to the basic laws which underlie natural structures as ranging from the formation of crystals to harmonic scales that can be worked out of logarythmic spirals, these building in the scales 12. 17, 31, 55...n. making use of the basic laws and axioms supplied by the French mathematician and physicist J. B. Fourier. He has come up with a machine that makes use of the newest advances in computer technology but is controlled through a simple set of symbols which are ultimately part of the Fourier philosophy (as they jokingly refer to it) that is slowly but steadily being constructed by the band. The future user of the Fourier will need and extensive background in the writings of such diverse personalities as R. Buckminster Fuller, Giordano Bruno, the alchemical writings of Newton, not to mention Nyquist, Walsh and others which have worked upon the mathematics of music. See also under Life Transmission for their earlier explanation.

Their philosophy was transmitted through both tonal and verbal means, whose basis was obscure to those who were not familiar with this band. Þeyr considered themselves as a "state within the state", a position considered elitist as it excluded those who did not lend their ears and minds to what Þeyr had to say and play.

"We were very keen on all kinds of conspiracy theories and tales of lost knowledge and lost worlds. We were certain that some awful truth was laying hidden somewhere; that we were being brainwashed by the state, schools and church" says Guðlaugur Óttarsson. The band held interest into ancient Norse wisdom, as well as alchemy, paganism, magic, Ancient Egypt, the secret society of the Illuminati, the Pythagorean School and the Galilean/Newtonian thinking complemented with the present era of Einstein/Heisenberg. But the press release quotes:

No sooner has their audience built up a definition (and following that, certain expectations) of Þeyr, when the band turns into the least expected direction and does something totally out of tune with their former work. It is only when their work is being observed over longer periods of time when the harmony behind their work begins to emerge: for instance Þeyr has always been a thorn in the eye of the Icelandic audience who wants to be able to define their groups as being political or apolitical, or serious (i.e. showing some social responsibility dealing with everything from "save the whales" to drinking problems) or just totally irresponsible (i.e. showing only affection for transient pleasures of life such as whaling, money.....or how to spend that money). On their first Icelandic album they defined their standpoint as being totally removed from arbitrary directive concepts such as left/right, East/West, up/down.

Þeyr bolstered a stance against fascism and performed along various antifascist groups in the United Kingdom like Crass and The Fall.

They only take a stand against a thing if it involves a restriction of any sort and seen from that point the view the majority of their lyrics can be seen as dealing with fascism of every conceivable sort [.......] Homo-Gestalt is a tongue-in-cheek handling of the newly emerging Neuro-Fascism, Techno-Logos deals with God as he appears in the Microchip-Cosmos, Rudolf deals with Political Fascism where diverse elements are united through a common object of hate etc.....

The funds gathered by the band were intended to finance the scientific projects of Guðlaugur, who has worked not only as a polytechnic engineer but as an inventor and as a mathematics expert.

=== After the break-up ===
Magnús Guðmundsson continued running his record label Mjöt and later he started the band Með Nöktum (With the Naked), which released an album titled Skemmtun in 1985. He collaborated on Hjálpum Þeim, a charity album recorded in 1986 to fight child poverty in Africa and withdrew from the music scene until late 2005 when he collaborated on Guðlaugur's solo album. Magnús has also worked for an insurance company and has been raising Icelandic ponies. He currently works for the insurance division of Landsbankinn (the National Bank).

Guðlaugur Kristinn Óttarsson and Sigtryggur Baldursson joined singer Björk Guðmundsdóttir from Tappi Tíkarrass, trumpet player and vocalist Einar Örn Benediktsson from Purrkur Pillnikk, keyboardist Einar Arnaldur Melax from Medúsa and bassist Birgir Mogensen from Spilafífl and dived into gothic rock with the band Kukl in August 1983.
After Kukl, Sigtryggur followed up with the Sugarcubes achieving big success abroad. Other music projects followed such as Bogomil Font, and by 1993 he moved with his wife to Madison, Wisconsin, where he collaborated with some local bands and from Chicago, set up a sublabel for Bad Taste, called Bad Taste USA, created his own drum session studio called The Slaughterhouse and recorded a few sampler discs at Laughing Cat and Æthen and Butch Vig's Smart studios. He collaborated with Jóhann Jóhannsson and released an album called Dip, then with Emilíana Torrini on her album Love in the Time of Science. He also played in Grindverk with Einar Örn and Hilmar Örn Hilmarsson, and more recently in a duet called Steintryggur with Steingrímur Guðmundsson.
Sigtryggur has also written articles for the radiostation Bylgjan, and newspapers Mannlif, Morgunblaðið, Vísir and Bleikt og Blátt.

Guðlaugur and Björk also worked together in a parallel project to KUKL known as the Elgar Sisters. Guðlaugur currently works as a session player and has as well released a few albums as a solo player, like Dense Time in 2005. His scientific activities have also taken an important part of his life, with theoretical research on subatomic particles, several inventions and the creation of Varmaraf, a thermoelectric company.

After leaving Þeyr, Þorsteinn Magnússon's attention was fixed on his solo project Stanya, which evolved into a band playing along with Haraldur Þorsteinsson, Ásgeir Óskarsson, Birgir Baldursson, Hjörtur Howser, and Kjartan Valdimarsson. He worked with different bands like Með Nöktum, Upplyfting, Frakkarnir, and Bubbi & MX-21, among others. He is currently playing in his band Stanya, and works as a session player.

Hilmar Örn Agnarsson went to Germany to study music and church organ, and he is currently working as an organist at the Cathedral of Skálholt, as a music teacher and as a choir conductor.

=== Reunion ===
After almost 23 years, the five-member band was reunited on April 15, 2006, at the Cathedral of Skálholt to play thirteen psalms taken from Passíusálmar, a fifty-psalm poetry work by Hallgrímur Pétursson. The band was joined by singer Megas, who had composed the music for the psalms back in 1973, a choir, guitarist and engineer Guðmundur Pétursson, and eleven other instrumentalists.

== Performances ==
Þeyr had hundreds of gigs throughout Iceland and abroad. Here is a list with some of the known gigs and tours.

Date	Place - Tour/Concert	Other artists
November 18, 1980	???	-
December 16, 1980	Gamla bíó	Utangarðsmenn, Fræbbblarnir
January 28, 1981	Hótel Saga	Jói á hakanum
1981	The Young Man Icelandic Tour	???
April 18, 1981	Austurbæjarbíó	Utangarðsmenn, Start, Purrkur Pillnikk, Grýlurnar, and Fræbbblarnir
April 23, 1981	Hótel Borg	Purrkur Pillnikk
July 3, 1981	Laugardalshöll	Fræbbblarnir, Englaryk, Fan Houtens Kókó, Taugadeildin, Box, Spilafífl, Exodus, Tappi Tíkarrass, Clitoris, Nast, Bruni BB
October 1, 1981	Selfossbíó	Purrkur Pillnikk
December 19, 1981	NEFS	Spegillspegill, Grenj, Purrkur Pillnikk, Þursum, Sjalfsfróun, Orghestum, and Vonbrigði
1982	Rehearsal place - Rokk í Reykjavík	Vonbrigði, Egó, Fræbbblarnir, Purrkur Pillnikk, Q4U, Bodies, Tappi Tíkarrass, Baraflokkurinn, Spilafífl, Þursaflokkurinn, Friðryk, Start, Grýlurnar, Mogo Homo, Jonee Jonee, Sjálfsfróun, Bruni BB, and Sveinbjörn Beinteinsson
April 12, 1982	Félagsstofnun Stúdenta	(Vonbrigði)
June 4, 1982	Hafnarbíó	Purrkur Pillnikk and Vonbrigði
May 6, 1983	Austurbæjarbíó	w/ the Fall and Iss.
1983	The Scandinavian Tour	???
???	???	???
April 15, 2006	Skálholt Cathedral	with Megas and Guðmundur Pétursson

== Discography ==
Albums:

- 1980 - Þagað í Hel (SG-Hljómplötur)
- 1981 - Mjötviður Mær (Eskvímó)
- 1982 - As Above... (Shout)
- 2001 - Mjötviður til Fóta (Esquimaux Management), anniversary compilation.

Singles/EPs:

- 1981 - Life Transmission (Fálkinn/Eskvímó)
- 1981 - Iður til Fóta (Eskvímó)
- 1982 - The Fourth Reich (Mjöt/Shout)
- 1983 - Lunaire (Gramm)

Unpublished material - Niceland:

- 1983 - Three songs were recorded: "Guess Again", "Catalyst" and "Take What’s Mine".

Featuring:

- 1981 - Brennu-Njálssaga (Íslenska kvikmyndasamsteypan), soundtrack to the film directed by Friðrik Þór Friðriksson.
- 1981 - Northern Lights Playhouse (Fálkinn), Icelandic compilation.
- 1982 - Rokk í Reykjavík (Hugrenningur), soundtrack to the documentary directed by Friðrik Þór Friðriksson.
- 1987 - Geyser - Anthology of the Icelandic Independent Music Scene of the Eighties (Enigma Records), Icelandic compilation.
- 1996 - Cold Fever (Iceland Film Corporation), soundtrack to the film directed by Friðrik Þ. Friðriksson.
- 1998 - Nælur (Spor), Icelandic compilation.

Films:

- 1982 - Rokk í Reykjavík (Íslenska kvikmyndasamsteypan), documentary directed by Friðriksson.

Video clip:

- 1982 - "Blood"

== See also ==
- Music of Iceland
