= Rokk í Reykjavík (soundtrack) =

Soundtrack album by miscellaneous
- Released: April 1982
- Recorded: 1981/1982
- Genre: Punk, rock, new wave, pop
- Length: 84:18
- Label: Hugrenningur; Cat. No.: HUG 001
- Producer: various

Rokk í Reykjavík is the soundtrack to the Icelandic TV documentary directed by Friðrik Þór Friðriksson during 1981-82 winter and released in 1982.
The soundtrack, which was released in April 1982 as a 2 LP released through Hugrenningur, features the performances of several Icelandic bands of the post-punk/new wave scene.
Bands such as Þeyr, Tappi Tíkarrass (a band led by singer Björk), Purrkur Pillnikk (with Einar Örn Benediktsson as the front-man), among others, were considered some of the most important bands at the moment. The image cover for this release is a picture of singer Björk performing with Tappi Tíkarrass.
The record sold over 2000 copies. Ira Robbins from Trouser Press stated that the album is a good compilation album to get to know Icelandic music.

== Reissue ==
- October 1993 - Rokk í Reykjavík. Label: Bad Taste. Catalogue number: SME2.

== LP 1 ==
Side A - length: 17:12
Side B - length: 20:37
Total length: 37:49

== Track listing ==
Track	Title	Length	Artist
Side A
01	Ó Reykjavík	02:25	Vonbrigði
02	Seig Heil	01:10	Egó
03	Gotta Go	01:45	Fræbbblarnir
04	Óvænt	01:07	Purrkur Pillnikk
05	Rúdolf	02:49	Þeyr
06	Creeps	01:48	Q4U
07	Breyttir Tímar	02:20	Egó
08	Where are the Bodies	05:08	Bodies
Side B
01	Hrollur	02:25	Tappi Tíkarrass
02	Moving Up to a Motion	03:15	Baraflokkurinn
03	Talandi Höfuð	02:55	Spilafífl
04	Í Speglinum	03:25	Þursaflokkurinn
05	Í Kirkju	02:42	Friðryk
06	Lífið og Tilveran	03:25	Start
07	Gullúrið	03:10	Grýlurnar

== LP 2 ==
Side C - length: 18:35
Side D - length: 20:34
Total length: 39:09

== Track listing ==
Track	Title	Length	Artist
Side C
01	Sat ég Inni á Klepp	03:42	Egó
02	Gluggagægir	03:00	Purrkur Pillnikk
03	Dúkkulísur	02:40	Tappi Tíkarrass
04	Bereft	03:18	Mogo Homo
05	Hver er Svo Sekur	02:35	Jonee Jonee
06	Killer Boogie	02:45	Þeyr
07	Kick Us Out of the Country	01:55	Bodies
Side D
01	Af Því Pabbi Vildi Það	01:43	Jonee Jonee
02	Í Nótt	01:48	Fræbbblarnir
03	Guðfræði	03:00	Vonbrigði
04	Stórir Strákar	02:40	Egó
05	Gonna Get You	01:26	Q4U
06	Toys	01:57	Q4U
07	Lollipops	02:50	Sjálfsfróun
08	Antichrist	01:10	Sjálfsfróun
09	Sjálfsfróun	01:30	Sjálfsfróun
10	Af Litlum Neista Verður Mikið Mál	02:30	Bruni BB
11	Rímur	02:00	Sveinbjörn Beinteinsson

== Credits ==
=== Personnel ===
Recording engineers from studio Þursabit: Júlíus Agnarsson, Tómas Magnús Tómasson, Þórður Árnason.
Sound: Jón Karl Helgason.
Executive board: Þorgeir Gunnarsson.
Mixing: Alan Snelling, Þórður Árnason.
Sound production: Anvil Studios, Abber Road, London.
Vinyl master cutting and vinyl pressing: Mayking Records, London.
Film processing and lithography: Prentsmiðjan Oddi.
Album design: Árni Páll Jóhansson.
Distribution: Steinar.

- Tracks recorded on an 8-track Dolby-Stereo recorder.

=== Artists ===
- Sveinbjörn Beinteinsson

Concert place: Menntaskólinn í Hamrahlið.

- Vonbrigði: Jóhann Vilhjámsson - vocals. Gunnar Ellertsson - bass. Árni Kristjánsson - guitar. Þórarinn Kristjánsson - drums.

Concert place: Hafnarbíó.

- Friðryk: Pétur Hjaltested - vocals, keyboards. Pálmi Gunnarsson - bass, vocals. Tryggvi J. Hübner - guitar. Sigurður Karlsson - drums. Björgvin Gíslason - guitar.

Concert place: Top of the Rock, U.S. NATO Base, Keflavík.

- Egó: Asbjörn Morthens - vocals. Bergþór Morthens - guitar. Þorleifur Guðjónsson - bass. Ragnar Sigurðsson - guitar. Magnús Stefánsson - drums.

Concert place: Hótel Borg and Æfingahúsnæði.

- Start: Pétur W. Kristjánsson - vocals. Eiríkur Hauksson - vocals, guitar. Nikulás Róbertsson - keyboards. Jón Ólafsson - bass. Davíð Karlsson - drums. Kristján Edelstein - guitar.

Concert place: Broadway.

- Tappi Tíkarrass: Björk Guðmundsdóttir - vocals. Eyþór Arnalds - vocals. Eyjólfur Jóhannsson - guitar. Jakob Smári Magnússon - bass. Oddur F. Sigurbjörnsson - drums.

Concert place: Ársel Community Centre.

- Þursaflokkurinn: Egill Ólafsson - keyboards, vocals. Þórður Árnason - guitar. Tómas Magnús Tómasson - bass. Ásgeir Óskarsson - drums. Júlíus Agnarsson - Mix.

Concert place:Studío Grettisgat.

- Baraflokkurinn: Ásgeir Jónsson - vocals. Þór Freysson - guitar. Jón Arnar Freysson - keyboards. Baldvin H. Sigurðsson - bass. Árni Henriksen - drums.

Concert place: Hótel Borg.

- Purrkur Pillnikk: Einar Örn Benediktsson - vocals. Bragi Ólafsson - bass. Friðrik Erlingsson - guitar. Ásgeir Bragason - drums.

Concert place: Menntaskólinn við Hamrahlið and rehearsal place.

- Q4U: Berglind G. Garðarsdóttir - vocals. Elínborg Halldórsdóttir - vocals. Gunnþór Sigurðsson - bass. Steinþór Stefánsson - guitar. Kormákur Geirharðsson - drums.

Concert place: Rehearsal place and Hótel Borg.

- Spilafífl:Sævar Sverrisson - vocals. Birgir Mogensen - bass. Örn Hjálmarsson - guitar. Halldór Lárusson - drums.

Concert place: NEFS club at University of Iceland.

- Þeyr: Magnús Guðmundsson - vocals. Guðlaugur Kristinn Óttarsson - guitar. Þorsteinn Magnússon - guitar. Hilmar Örn Agnarsson - bass. Sigtryggur Baldursson - drums.

Concert place: Rehearsal place.

- Bruni BB: Helgi Friðþjófsson - vocals. Ámundi Sigurðsson - vocals. Kristján E. Karlsson - vocals. Hörður Bragason - keyboards. Björn Roth - bass. Finnbogi Ásgeirsson - guitar. Sigurður Ingólfsson - guitar. Ómar Stefánsson - drums.

Concert place: Nýlistasafnið.

- Bodies: Michael D. Pollock - guitar. Daniel Pollock - guitar. Magnús Stefánsson - drums. Rúnar Erlingsson - bass.

Concert place: Hótel Borg.

- Grýlurnar: Ragnhildur Gísladóttir - vocals. Inga Rún Pálmadóttir - guitar. Linda Björk Hreiðarsdóttir - drums. Herdís Hallvarðsdóttir - bass.

Concert place: Óðal.

- Sjálfsfróun: Bjarni Þ. Þórðarson - vocals, bass. Sigurður Ágústsson - guitar. Jónbjörn Valgeirsson - drums.

Concert place: Hafnarbíó.

- Jonee Jonee: Þorvar Hafsteinsson - vocals. Bergsteinn Björgólfsson - bass. Heimir Barðason - drums.

Concert place: NEFS.

- Fræbbblarnir: Valgarður Guðjónsson - vocals. Stefán K. Guðjónsson - drums. Steinþór Stefánsson - bass. Tryggvi Þór Tryggvason - guitar. Kristinn Steingrímsson - guitar.

Concert place: Fellahellir.

- Mogo Homo: Óskar Þórisson - vocals, keyboards. Óðinn Guðbrandsson - bass.

Concert place: Bereft.

== See also ==
- 1982 - Rokk í Reykjavík (Íslenska kvikmyndasamsteypan), the TV documentary.
