= List of Bad Taste artists =

This is a list of notable artists signed by Bad Taste, and have Wikipedia articles.

== Artists ==
=== A ===
- Ásgerður Júníusdóttir
- Atli Heimir Sveinsson

=== B ===
- Bellatrix a.k.a. Kolrassa Krókríðandi
- Björk
- Bogomil Font
- Borko
- Botnleðja

=== D ===
- Daníel Bjarnason
- Didda
- Dikta

=== E ===
- Eberg
- Egill Ólafsson
- Einar Örn Benediktsson
- Emilíana Torrini

=== F ===
- Fræbbblarnir

=== G ===
- Gabríela Friðriksdóttir
- GusGus

=== H ===
- HAM
- Haukur Tómasson
- Hilmar Örn Hilmarsson
- Hljómar

=== J ===
- Jagúar
- Jóhann Jóhannsson

=== K ===
- Kimono

=== L ===
- Lárus H Grímsson
- Lárus Sigurðsson
- Leaves

=== M ===
- Magnús Blöndal Jóhannsson
- Maus
- Megas
- Mínus
- Mugison
- Mammút.

=== P ===
- Paul Óscar
- Pax
- Purrkur Pillnikk.

=== Q ===
- Q4U
- Quarashi.

=== R ===
- Risaeðlan a.k.a. Reptile

=== S ===
- Sigur Rós
- Singapore Sling
- Sjón
- Skakkamanage
- Ske
- Skúli Sverrisson
- Slowblow
- Spoon
- Stafrænn Hakon
- Steindor Andersen
- Sveinbjörn Beinteinsson

=== T ===
- The Hamrahlid Choir
- The Sugarcubes
- Tómas R. Einarsson
- Trabant
- Trúbrot
- TV Pow.

=== U ===
- Unun
- Utangarðsmenn.

=== Þ ===
- Þeyr
- Þór's Hammer
- Þorkell Sigurbjörnsson.

== See also ==
- List of record labels
- Bad Taste
