= Island (HÖH and Current 93 album) =

Studio album by: HÖH; Current 93
- Released: November 1991
- Recorded: 1986–1991
- Studio: Stúdíó Sýrland; Hot Ice
- Length: 1:00:20
- Language: English
- Label: Durtro
- Producer: HÖH

Island is a studio album by HÖH and Current 93, released in November 1991 through Durtro. It differs from much of Current 93's output due to its prominent use of synthesizers and ambient music. Some of the compositions also appear on HÖH's soundtrack for the film Children of Nature. The CD release of Island includes humorous bonus tracks.

== Background ==
In the late 1980s, David Tibet of the British band Current 93 considered moving permanently to Iceland. He knew Icelanders such as Sveinbjörn Beinteinsson, leader of the Icelandic neopagan organisation Ásatrúarfélagið, and the composer HÖH, full name Hilmar Örn Hilmarsson, who also was active in Ásatrúarfélagið and eventually became its leader in 2003. Although Tibet never moved to the country, he made a number of visits, released an album with Sveinbjörn's rímur singing titled Edda and collaborated with HÖH over several years. Among his works with HÖH are the 1987 spoof album The Aryan Aquarians Meet Their Waterloo, conceived when they were inebriated, and the more serious album Island. Island was recorded from 1986 to 1991 over several studio sessions in Iceland. HÖH booked studio time every time Tibet visited the country, without any plan for what the album would contain or what it would be called.

== Music and lyrics ==
Island combines HÖH's work with synthesizers, ambient music and influences from classical music with Current 93's interest in religion, mortality and humour. Some of HÖH's compositions for the album were also used on his soundtrack for the 1991 Icelandic film Children of Nature, directed by Friðrik Þór Friðriksson. "The Dream of a Shadow of Smoke" uses quotations from the 17th-century treatise The Rule and Exercises of Holy Dying by the philosopher Jeremy Taylor. "Anyway, People Die" features a Buddhist Lama as a guest musician.

The CD version of Island includes five humorous and more synth-pop oriented bonus tracks. "Crowleymass Unveiled" originally appeared on the 1987 EP Crowleymass and pokes fun at Tibet's previous interest in Aleister Crowley. "The Fall of Christopher Robin" is about how the children's book character Christopher Robin becomes morally corrupted. Tibet later said he regretted not creating a clear demarcation between the first eight tracks and the lightweight bonus tracks, and that "Island was an interesting album but the trouble with any keyboard or synthesizer-based album is that they date rapidly".

== Reception ==
Andreas Diesel and Dieter Gerten wrote that Island stands out in Current 93's discography due to HÖH's musical influence, characterised by "symphonic synthesizer sounds and hypnotic percussion". David Keenan complimented Tibet's lyrics and highlighted "The Dream of a Shadow of Smoke" and "Falling", writing that Tibet's songwriting successfully merges with HÖH's arrangements and Björk's backing vocals on those tracks. Otherwise, Keenen said the album suffers from "a nasty new age sheen, complete with a Lou Reed-like bass sound redolent of the mating calls of whales", and that the bonus tracks from the CD drag it down.

== Track listing ==
No.	Title	Length
1.	"Falling"	4:22
2.	"The Dream of a Shadow of Smoke"	5:21
3.	"Lament for My Suzanne"	4:19
4.	"Fields of Rape (Sightless Return)"	2:51
5.	"Passing Horses"	4:26
6.	"Anyway, People Die"	7:04
7.	"To Blackened Earth"	4:14
8.	"Oh Merry-Go-Round"	3:45

CD bonus tracks
No.	Title	Length
9.	"Crowleymass Unveiled"	7:38
10.	"Paperback Honey"	4:53
11.	"The Fall of Christopher Robin"	5:52
12.	"Fields of Rape and Smoke"	2:49
13.	"Merry-Go-Round and Around"	3:46
Total length:		1:00:20

== Personnel ==
- David Tibet – vocals
- HÖH – keyboards, acoustic guitar, bass guitar, harp, percussion
- Björk Guðmundsdóttir – backing vocals on "Falling"
- Akiko Hada – backing vocals on "Falling"
- Thór Eldon – guitar on "Crowleymass"
- Godkrist – guitar on "Passing Horses" and "Crowleymass"
- Liz Aster – backing vocals on "Fields of Rape" and "Merry-Go-Round"
- Bogomil Font – backing vocals on "Merry-Go-Round"
- Ása Hlín Svavarsdóttir – vocals on "The Dream of a Shadow of Smoke"
- Birgir Baldursson – drums and percussion on "Paperback Honey"
- The Venerable 'Chimed Rig'dzin Lama, Rinpoche – bells and drums on "Anyway, People Die"
- Johnny Triumph – backing vocals on "Merry-Go-Round" and "Crowleymass"
- Joolie Wood – violin on "Anyway, People Die" and "Merry-Go-Round"
- Rose McDowall – backing vocals on "Paperback Honey" and "Fields of Rape and Smoke"
- Einar Örn – backing vocals on "Fields of Rape and Smoke" and "Crowleymass"
- Tómas M. Tómasson – bass guitar on "The Dream of a Shadow of Smoke", "Fields of Rape and Smoke" and "To Blackened Earth"
