= As Above... =

Studio album by Þeyr
- Released: 1982
- Genre: New wave
- Length: 32:24
- Labels: Shout; Cat. No.: LX001
- Producers: Þeyr and Tony Cook

Þeyr chronology
Mjötviður Mær (1981)	As Above... (1982)	The Fourth Reich (EP) (1982)

As Above... is an album released in 1982 by Þeyr, an Icelandic new wave and rock group. It was issued through the Shout record label on a 12" vinyl record.

Consisting of 12 tracks, As above... contained English versions of the band's hits. A song that stands out from the rest is "Killer Boogie", a work which has been considered an attempt by the group to break through on the international market.

"Killer Boogie" and "Rúdolf" are featured again in Rokk í Reykjavík (Rock in Reykjavík), a concert compilation released in 1982 with the presence of other renowned Icelandic bands. There is also a video for this compilation which was edited on VHS format only.

"Rúdolf" contains a sample of Hitler saying "Around us is Germany. In us Germany marches. And behind us Germany follows". It was a fragment taken from Triumph des Willens (Triumph of the Will), a propaganda film directed by Leni Riefenstahl in 1934. However, the record inserts credit A. Schicklgruber as the impersonator of Hitler's voice.

The title of the album is thought to be inspired by Killing Joke's What's THIS For...! from 1981. It sarcastically refers either to the band's name or to their previous works (in the sense that "as above" is written on application forms). It is sometimes also considered to be half of the occult maxim "as above, so below," which originates in the second line of the medieval alchemical text called the Tabula Smaragdina or Emerald Tablet.

The remaining songs of this album were never reissued since the masters are believed to be lost. By 2001 Þeyr's members and friends released a CD titled Mjötviður til Fóta which included songs from their second album, Mjötviður Mær and the single Iður til Fóta, both releases from 1981.

== Track listing ==
Track	Title	Length	Lyrics	Audio clips
Side A
01	Homo Gestalt	03:31	-	-
02	Killer Boogie	02:58	-	-
03	Dead/Undead	03:22	-	-
04	Wolf	02:51	-	-
05	Technologos	01:58	-	-
06	Poème	02:48	-	-
Side B
01	Current	03:21	-	-
02	Rúdolf	02:49	-	-
03	Are You Still There	03:08	-	-
04	Enough	02:23	-	-
05	Shout	03:00	-	-
06	Mjötviður	02:55	instrumental	-

== Track notes ==
- "Homo Gestalt" is another version of "Life Transmission" which appeared on Life Transmission (1981).
- "Dead/Undead" is the English version of "Bás 12" which appeared in Iður til Fóta (1981).
- "Wolf" is the same as "Úlfur", from Mjötviður Mær (1981).
- "Technologos" is the same as "2999" from Mjötviður Mær.
- "Are You Still There" is the English version of "Tedrukkinn" from Mjötviður Mær.
- "Enough" is the same as "Það er Nóg" from Mjötviður Mær.
- "Shout" is the English version of "Ópið" from Mjötviður Mær.

== Controversy over Rúdolf ==
The meaning of the song "Rúdolf" was the focus of controversy among many who thought it was an allegory to Nazism. Þeyr was an anti-fascist group. Several years later, drummer Sigtryggur Baldursson said: "The song 'Rúdolf' was supposed to be a criticism, but was really interpreted as we were Nazis. We also adopted some Nazi things like clothing, but we were never real Nazis. We were just showing off, just like today."

== Credits ==
Production: Þeyr and Tony Cook.
Music: all tracks by Þeyr.
Lyrics: Hilmar Örn Hilmarsson, with the exception of "Killer Boogie" whose lyrics were created by Þeyr.
Backing vocals: A. Schichelgruber is credited on the song "Rúdolf".
Album and sleeve design: Hilmar Örn Hilmarsson.
