= Guðlaugur Kristinn Óttarsson =

Icelandic musician (born 1954)

- Born: 1954 (age 71–72)
- Origin: Iceland
- Occupations: Researcher, composer
- Website: www.islandia.is/gko/

Guðlaugur Kristinn Óttarsson (born 11 December 1954) is an Icelandic researcher and composer.

== Music career ==
=== Early bands ===
Steinblóm (Stone Flowers) (1969) was his first group. It was a trio formed by Guðlaugur (electric and acoustic guitars), Haraldur Johannessen (acoustic guitar) and Gunnar Magnússon (acoustic bass). Steinblóm played Guðlaugur originals and folk songs. At that time, he was experimenting with homemade electro-acoustic guitars and amplifiers. Steinblóm played gigs in Reykjavík and the suburbs.

Lótus was created while he was at Laugarvatn high school in 1972. In 1974 and 1975 and played all over Iceland in 1974 when the country celebrated its 1,100th anniversary. Lótus was basically a rock band whose members were Guðlaugur, Guðjón Sigurbjörnsson, both on electric guitars, Böðvar Helgi Sigurðsson (electric bass), Guðmann Þorvaldsson (drums) and Sigurður Ingi Pálsson (vocals). Lotus' music was contemporary rock and Guðlaugur originals, including arrangements to Mozart and Beethoven in a rock style. Lótus did not release any record, but they did some two-track recordings believed to be lost.

He joined Sextettinn (Sextet) (1977) when he was at University. He joined Sveinbjörn Baldvinsson (guitarist), Gunnar Hrafnsson (bass), Stefán Stefánsson (saxophone), Guðjón Hilmarsson (drums), and Kristín Jóhannsdóttir (vocals). The music of Sextettinn was original themes performed in several different styles from country-rock and pop-rock to pop-jazz. Sextettinn gigged throughout Iceland and had a presentation at the local TV station. Guðlaugur stayed for a short time, as his studies were taking most of his time. The remaining members of the group continued under a different name: Ljósin í Bænum, (The Lights of the City) and released an album still popular in Iceland.

Guðlaugur then joined a group called Galdrakarlar & Wilma Reading (The Wizards & Wilma Reading) (1977). This band consisted of brass, keyboards, guitars, bass and drums. The band toured Iceland and gave around 30 concerts. Wilma Reading (vocals), was the group leader. She was an Australian singer and actress with roots in Broadway and Hollywood. Their music style was mainly jazz-oriented with influences from George Gershwin, Louis Armstrong, Oscar Hammerstein II to Duke Ellington. The other members of Galdrakarlar & Wilma Reading, besides were: Birgir Einarsson (trumpet), Hlöðver Smári Haraldsson (keyboards), Hreiðar Sigurjónsson (clarinet and saxophone baritone), Pétur Hjálmarsson (electric bass), Sófus Jón Björnsson (drums) and Stefán Stefánsson (saxophone soprano and flute).

=== Þeyr ===
In January 1981, Guðlaugur joined Þorsteinn Magnússon on guitar, Hilmar Örn Agnarsson (electric bass), Magnús Guðmundsson (lead vocals) and Sigtryggur Baldursson, (drums/percussion).

By spring 1981 their first single was on the streets. It was "Life Transmission", the band's first work sung in English. By autumn they came up with Iður til Fóta, a four-track EP. Its cassette version featured "Brennu-Njálssaga", the soundtrack to the eponymous film by Friðrik Þór Friðriksson about Njál's saga.
In late 1981 Þeyr released an album titled Mjötviður Mær.

In 1982, Þeyr released their last album with the title of As Above.... This work contains English versions of the group's hits. The most notable song of this record was "Killer Boogie" since it is considered as an attempt to achieve an international position. In 1982 the group performed on a concert in Reykjavík that was recorded and went out as a live concert release named Rokk í Reykjavík (Rock in Reykjavík). This concert gathered some of the important Icelandic bands including Purrkur Pillnikk and Tappi Tíkarrass. Þeyr appeared in this compilation with two songs: "Killer Boogie" and "Rúdolf". That year the group released an EP titled The Fourth Reich.

In 1982, Jaz Coleman, the singer of Killing Joke, had moved to Iceland because he feared that the end of the world was looming. He collaborated with several music bands, but above all with Þeyr, and created a group originally called Iceland, but subsequently renamed Niceland. Although this group was formed by Coleman and Þeyr's musicians, it did not include Þorsteinn Magnússon, the other guitarist. After rehearsing, Niceland was ready to record 5 songs in 1983, but two were not finished; the three recorded songs were: "Guess Again", "Catalyst" and "Take What's Mine". They were published in the movie "Death and Resurrection Show" in 2015

In 1983, Þeyr released the last single: "Lunaire".

In 2001, thanks to the support of family and friends, he released a CD to commemorate Þeyr's 20th anniversary. This CD contained newly discovered mixes of Iður til Fóta y Mjötviður Mær, and was named Mjötviður til Fóta.

=== Kukl and the Elgar Sisters ===
Following Þeyr, Guðlaugur and Sigtryggur joined Einar Örn Benediktsson, the vocalist of Purrkur Pillnikk, Einar Arnaldur Melax keyboardist from Medúsa, Björk Guðmundsdóttir, vocalist of Tappi Tíkarrass and bassist Birgir Mogensen from Spilafífl when Ásmundur Jónsson from Gramm (then Iceland's most important record company) wanted to create a band with cutting-edge artists to perform for the last edition of the radio program Áfangar which had been cancelled. After composing and rehearsing for two weeks the group appeared under the name of Kukl ("Sorcery", in Medieval Icelandic).

Although Kukl's style was a type of dark gothic rock in the style of Killing Joke and innovative references to the Fall's post-punk, it was later defined by Björk as "existential jazz-punk-hardcore".

While touring Iceland, they performed with the pro-anarchy group Crass and subsequently visited the United Kingdom in a series of gigs with Flux of Pink Indians.

Their first release was the single "Söngull" in 1983, a version of "Dismembered", corresponding to their following release of The Eye, an album released in 1984. With respect to this work, Sounds magazine gave it 5 stars (excellent) for expanding the music imposed by Crass Records. With decaying metals, disrupted rock sounds and vocal inflections of "Assassin" that show the essence of this album. Other songs include "The Spire" that stands out with central phrases overlapped to background lines and the song "Anna", maker of a threatening environment.

On 14 September 1984 Kukl performed in Paris, where they recorded a cassette edited by French independent record label V.I.S.A. with the title of KUKL à Paris 14.9.84. Kukl continued with another album titled Holidays in Europe (The Naughty Nought) in 1986. It was released through Crass Records. This work is far more complex and all wind instruments were replaced by keyboards and bells. Songs like "A Mutual Thrill" are a mélange of pop and experimental post-indie music.

Þór Eldon Jónsson, the guitarist of Medúsa had been dating Björk when she became pregnant, so Kukl became an exhausting task. Einar Örn was studying in London and when he came back to Iceland in summer 1986 decided that Kukl was over and a new project should be set up in order to deal with the group's expenditures. The Sugarcubes band soon followed, ending Kukl. Guðlaugur and Birgir Mogensen were the only musicians who did not continue on the new project.

Guðlaugur and Björk created the Elgar Sisters, which coexisted with Kukl, although it lasted longer. This group released no albums, but did record 11 songs from 1984 to 1986. Guðlaugur (electric and acoustic guitarist) and composed most of the songs. Björk (vocals), composed three songs (two with Guðlaugur). The Elgar Sisters could be seen as their duo project. The other musicians were Birgir Mogensen (electric bass), Einar Melax (keyboards), Hilmar Örn Hilmarsson (HÖH) (keyboards and synthetic drums), Sigtryggur Baldursson (drums/percussion and Þorsteinn Magnússon (electric guitar).
A few songs recorded by the Elgar Sisters came to light via Björks's solo career and on Guðlaugur's solo album released in late 2005.

=== Other music projects ===
Hættuleg Hljómsveit ("The Dangerous Orchestra") was a group in which he participated along Magnús Þór Jónsson (Megas), Björk, Birgir Baldursson, and Haraldur Þorsteinsson. This group, which was active from 1990–1991 was established after the release of Hættuleg hljómsveit & glæpakvendið Stella, an album by Megas in 1990. The band did many concerts in southwestern Iceland, in the outskirts of Reykjavík and later in rural areas of Northern Iceland. By this period Björk was no longer a member. Hættuleg Hljómsveit never released a record.

MÖK Trio was a group formed by bassist Tómas Magnús Tómasson (mainly known by his work in Stuðmenn), Hilmar Örn Hilmarsson and Guðlaugur. In fact, the name stemmed from the initials corresponding to the middle name of each member. Their first gig was approximately in 1992. MÖK Trio did not play regularly and they never released an album. Their last presentation was in August 2001 at Galdrahátíðin á Ströndum, Reykjavík.

INRI was a project of Magnús Jensson. Guðlaugur joined Magnús and played extensively through Iceland in irregular periods from 1993. Some tracks were recorded in 1995.

Gvdl was a group created in 2001 with Hilmar Örn Hilmarsson and bassist Georg Bjarnason for the arrival of the American band Fuck. In fact, the sequence Gvdl corresponds to Fuck with each letter switched to the next one in the alphabet.

=== Collaborations ===
==== Psychic TV ====
In 1984 Guðlaugur added guitars on Psychic TV's album Those Who Do Not. This work was produced by Hilmar Örn Hilmarsson and Guðlaugur and used one of his inventions, the P-Orridgemeter. It was a device that could be programmed with any given frequency and was activated to make an identical structure and pattern for other sampled sound. By this means, digital or sound samples were "played" by individuals who were not physically present. For instance, a vocalist could activate a bell sound. This could be recorded as an identical pattern and then the voice was erased.
In 1987 these tracks were reissued with a different name, Live in Reykjavik, an album that was released by Temple Records, the record label owned by Genesis P-Orridge.

==== Megas ====
Guðlaugur contributed to multiple albums by Megas, the Icelandic rock father, as a guitarist, arranger and composer. His first contribution was in 1987 for the album Loftmynd and in 1988 he appeared again on Höfuðlausnir, which featured Björk and Rose McDowell as backing vocalists. In 1990 Guðlaugur added guitars on Hættuleg Hljómsveit & Glæpakvendið Stella, an album featuring The Sugarcubes. In 1992 appeared on Þrír Blóðdropar, an album with the addition of Bubbi Morthens, Móeiður Júníusdóttir, and drummer Sigtryggur Baldursson. Drög að Upprisu followed in 1994.

In 2002, Guðlaugur's contributions were featured on the compilation Megas 1972–2002. The same year he joined Megas playing the song "Edge and Over" for Fálkar, the soundtrack to Friðriksson's film Falcons.

=== Bubbi Morthens ===
In 1989 Guðlaugur worked with singer Bubbi Morthens for the 10 track album Nóttin Langa. Part of this work is featured on Bubbi's Sögur 1980–1990, a 1999 compilation.

=== Björk ===
In August 1993 Björk released Venus as a Boy featuring an Elgar Sisters song, "Stígðu Mig" on the second CD. In November Big Time Sensuality went out featuring other Elgar songs, "Síðasta Ég" and "Glora". On 4 November 2002 Björk released a CD box titled Family Tree, containing three songs featuring Guðlaugur, "Síðasta Ég" and "Fuglar".

=== Other artists ===
In 1987 he worked on Crowleymass, an album by Current 93, the band led by David Tibet (ex Psychic TV), with the collaboration of HÖH who at that time was in Nyarlathotep's Idiot Flute Players. It was a single edited by Maldoror in a limited edition of 2,000 copies in the United Kingdom.

In 1990 Guðlaugur played on Crusher of Bones, an album released by Reptilicus. Produced by HÖH, it was an example of darkwave/industrial of the early 1990s.

In 1994 he worked with Neol Einsteiger on the album Heitur Vindur and by 1995 added guitars on the song "Eftirmáli og Ályktarnir" which appeared on Kjöttromman, an album released by EXEM, the band led by Einar Melax and poet Þorri Jóh. In 1998 he played on Ull by Súkkat, a band formed by Hafþór and Gunnar Ólafsson.

In 2003 Guðlaugur played with Graveslime on their album Roughness and Toughness. He played on the song "American Sleeper".

=== Solo career ===
With a free style and influences from Frank Zappa and Duke Ellington he performed on national TV and radio stations accompanied by other musicians or just solo concerts. In 2002 he released an album called Alone with Guitar that contained arrangements to five pieces of Bach. It was followed by another CD containing tracks from the Elgar Sisters and some of his live performances.

On 23 October 2004 he was asked to compose a song to be performed by the belfry of Hallgrímskirkja (the Icelandic cathedral). The song was performed by the church organist during the Iceland Airwaves festival.

On 9 December 2005 he released Dense Time, his first solo album. It is a review of his music work, including new songs and featuring Icelandic musicians including Björk, Megas, Agnar Wilhelm Agnarsson, Ragnhildur Gísladóttir, Guðmundur Jónsson (an operatic singer and Guðlaugur's stepfather), Guðmunsson, and others. It was produced by Guðlaugur with Arni Guðjónsson (leader of the band Leaves), and guitarist Guðmundur Pétursson.

== Personal life ==
Besides his musical work, Guðlaugur Kristinn Óttarsson has been highly involved in his family company "Gull og Silfursmiðjan Erna" from early age, and at 15 years old he was sent to Denmark to learn the technique of "Lost Wax" to implement in the company.

Beside his work in precious metals, at an early age he started to work on hydroelectric power plants and was a student of electrical engineering under his master Sigfús Vigfússon, so he enrolled in the University of Iceland to study polytechnical engineering and mathematical physics and for the last 27 years has solely worked as a technical teacher and innovator and has written over 40 papers published in international depositaries such as IEEE and Research Gate.

== Discography ==
=== Discography with Þeyr (1981–1983) ===
Albums:

- 1981 – Mjötviður Mær (Eskvímó)
- 1982 – As Above... (Shout)
- 2001 – Mjötviður til Fóta (Esquimaux Management), 20th anniversary release.

Singles / EPs:

- 1981 – Iður til Fóta (Eskvímó)
- 1981 – Life Transmission (Fálkinn/Eskvímó)
- 1982 – The Fourth Reich (Mjöt)
- 1983 – Lunaire (Gramm)

Featuring:

- 1981 – Brennu-Njálssaga (Íslenska kvikmyndasamsteypan), film directed by Friðrik Þór Friðriksson.
- 1981 – Northern Lights Playhouse (Fálkinn), Icelandic compilation.
- 1982 – Rokk í Reykjavík (Hugrenningur), soundtrack to the documentary directed by Friðriksson.
- 1987 – Geyser - Anthology of the Icelandic Independent Music Scene of the Eighties (Enigma Records), Icelandic compilation.
- 1996 – Cold Fever (Iceland Film Corporation), soundtrack to the movie directed by Friðrik Þór Friðriksson.
- 1998 – Nælur (Spor), Icelandic compilation.

Video clips:

- 1983 – Blood

Featuring on films:

- 1982 – Rokk í Reykjavík (Íslenska kvikmyndasamsteypan), documentary directed by Friðrik Þór Friðriksson.

=== Discography of Kukl (1983–1986) ===
Single:

- 1983 – Söngull (Gramm)

Albums:

- 1984 – The Eye (Crass Records)
- 1985 – KUKL à Paris 14.9.84 (V.I.S.A.)
- 1986 – Holidays in Europe (The Naughty Nought) (Crass Records)

Featuring and collaborations:

- 1984 – V.I.S.A. Présente (Bondage Records / V.I.S.A.), European compilation.
- 1987 – Geyser - Anthology of the Icelandic Independent Music Scene of the Eighties (Enigma Records), Icelandic compilation.
- 2002 – Family Tree (One Little Indian), CD box by Björk.

=== Solo career ===
- 2002 – Alone with Guitar (RÚV-Rás 2)
- 2002 – Misc. Music, (Pronil Holdings)
- 2005 – Dense Time (Pronil Holdings)

=== Collaborations ===
- 1984 – Those Who Do Not (Gramm), album by Psychic TV.
- 1987 – Live in Reykjavik (Temple Records), album by Psychic TV.
- 1987 – Loftmynd (Gramm), album by Megas.
- 1987 – Crowleymass (Maldoror), single by Current 93.
- 1988 – Höfuðlausnir (Gramm), album by Megas.
- 1989 – Nóttin Langa (Geisli), album by Bubbi Morthens.
- 1990 – Hættuleg hljómsveit & glæpakvendið Stella (Megas), album by Megas.
- 1990 – Crusher of Bones (8 Product), album by Reptilicus.
- 1992 – Þrír Blóðdropar (Skífan), album by Megas.
- 1993 – Big Time Sensuality (One Little Indian), single of Debut, album by Björk.
- 1993 – Venus as a Boy (One Little Indian), [CD 2], single of Debut, album by Björk.
- 1994 – Debut Box Set – The CD Singles Collection from Debut (One Little Indian), singles box by Björk.
- 1994 – Drög að Upprisu (Japis), album by Megas and Nýdönsk.
- 1994 – Heitur Vindur (Minningarsjóður Pétur Inga Þorgilssonar), album by Neol Einsteiger.
- 1995 – Kjöttromman (Bad Taste), album by EXEM.
- 1998 – Ull (Súkkat), album by Súkkat.
- 1999 – Sögur 1980–1990 (Íslenskir Tónar), greatest hits by Bubbi Morthens.
- 2001 – Haugbrot (Ómi), album by Megas.
- 2001 – Far... Þinn Veg (Ómi), album by Megas.
- 2002 – Megas (???), compilation by Megas.
- 2002 – Megas 1972–2002 (Skífan), compilation by Megas.
- 2002 – Family Tree (One Little Indian), CD box by Björk.
- 2002 – Fálkar (Smekkleysa), soundtrack to the film directed by Friðrik Þór Friðriksson.
- 2003 – Roughness and Toughness (GS-Dolphins), album by Graveslime.
- 2005 – Hús Datt (Smekkleysa), album by Megasukk.
