= Jóhannes Helgason =

Icelandic guitar player (born 1958)

Jóhannes Helgason (born 16 June 1958) is an Icelandic guitar player known for his work in the band Þeyr. He currently works as a pilot for Icelandair.

== Early bands ==
Jóhannes was born in Reykjavík. In the winter of 1972 he joined vocalist Guðmundur Eyjólfsson, drummer Hilmar Örn Hilmarsson, and bassist Birgir Ottóson to form a school band called Fatima. By 1974 Eiríkur Hauksson had replaced Guðmundur as a vocalist and guitarist Sigurgeir Sigmundsson had joined the group. Fatima disbanded in 1975, and it was followed by another band called Piccolo, which broke up two years later, but Eiríkur later achieved success with the Norwegian band Artch. Jóhannes joined singer Magnús Guðmundsson, bassist Hilmar Örn Agnarsson and Hilmar Örn Hilmarsson (in drums and synthesizer) who had been playing in a band called Fellibylur. Two new members joined the band: vocalist Elín Reynisdóttir, and drummer Sigtryggur Baldursson. They formed a band called Frostrósir (Window frost) and played in Reykjavík and surroundings. Frostrósir led the way for a more ambitious project.

== Þeyr ==
In 1979 Frostrósir changed its name to Þeyr and Hilmar Örn Hilmarsson collaborated with some lyrics and managed the band with Guðni Rúnar Agnarsson. The same year they contacted Svavar Gestsson from label SG-Hljómplötur and showed him two tracks. After getting a record deal they started to record their debut album in January 1980 until February when they took a break during which the band was influenced by the new wave and started to experiment with their music. The recording sessions were resumed in September, with new material which brought about certain concern within the label.

The album was named Þagað í Hel (Silenced to Death) and was released in December 1980. Þeyr had some promotional gigs and were joined by guitarist Guðlaugur Kristinn Óttarsson. By early 1981 Jóhannes decided to leave the band so that he could continue with his aeronautical studies and Elín left the band soon after. Magnús became the leading singer and guitarist Þorsteinn Magnússon joined the band.

In 1998, record label Spor released a compilation CD titled Nælur, which contained three songs by Þeyr, including “En”, from Þagað í Hel, which became into the only song reissued because the remaining tracks of this album were lost in a fire at the Tóntækni studios a few years after the debut album was released.

== Aeronautical studies ==
In February 1978, after finishing high school at Menntaskólinn við Sund, Jóhannes started to take flight lessons at Flugtak. In December 1980 he withdrew from Þeyr to focus on his studies and obtained the commercial flying license and the flight instructor license. He started to work at Flugtak for two years, and later as a flight instructor for Hnit Consulting Engineers.
He has been flying for the company Icelandair, since February 1983.

Jóhannes Helgason is married to Unnur Einarsdóttir and has two sons: Helgi (1982), and Atli Jóhannesson (1988).

== Discography ==
=== Early bands ===
Fatima

- No official releases.

Piccolo

- No official releases.

Frostrósir

- No official releases. This band evolved into Þeyr.

=== Discography with Þeyr ===
Album:

- 1980 - Þagað í Hel (SG-Hljómplötur)

Featuring:

- 1998 - Nælur (Spor), Icelandic compilation.
