= Þagað í Hel =

Studio album by Þeyr
- Released: December 1980
- Recorded: January–February/September 1980
- Genre: Pop rock, disco, new wave
- Length: 32:05
- Label: SG - hljómplötur SG-139
- Producer: Hilmar Örn Agnarsson

Þeyr chronology
Þagað í Hel (1980)	Life Transmission (1981)

Þagað í Hel is the first album released by Icelandic band Þeyr in December 1980 through label SG-hljómplötur. An album of pop, soft rock and disco compositions, It showcases the early musical style of the band before they became influenced by the burgeoning punk scene in Iceland, and is hardly representative of their trademark avant-garde and aggressive post-punk sound which quickly followed.

By late 1979 Þeyr members contacted Svavar Gestsson, the owner of SG-Hljómplötur, and introduced him a few songs of disco music. Svavar sent them to studio Tóntækni and the recording sessions began in January 1980 and were concluded in February when the band decided to take a break, which was extended until September, when the album was finished. Over the long break, new wave music was hitting Iceland and Þeyr got heavily influenced by it. Therefore, part of the recorded album featured two different music styles. The album was titled Þagað í Hel, which means Silenced to Death and it was introduced to Svavar, who felt reluctant to release it because he didn't like the music nor even the album design, but his wife, Elly Vilhjálms (a renowned singer from the 1960s and 1970s), did like it and persuaded him to release it.

Thus, Þagað í Hel came out to the streets by December 1980, on limited edition because the vinyl printing was defected and only 500 low quality copies were released. After the release of Þagað í Hel, Þeyr gained popularity in Iceland thanks to the critic reviews and the band underwent internal changes with the departure of guitarist Jóhannes Helgason and vocalist Elín Reynisdóttir.
About a year later, Tóntækni studios were caught in a fire and the masters and all unpublished recordings of Þeyr up to that moment were lost forever.
The only song to survive was "En…", which was featured on Nælur, a compilation released by label Spor in 1998. Þagað í Hel is currently out of availability and has become a collector’s item.

== Track listing ==
=== Side 1 ===
1. "En…" (Music: Magnús Guðmundsson, Lyrics: Hilmar Örn Hilmarsson) – 04:48
2. "…Nema Jói" (Music: Hilmar Örn Agnarsson, Lyrics: Hilmar Örn Hilmarsson) – 03:20
3. "Hringt" (Music: Sverrir Agnarsson, Lyrics: Hilmar Örn Hilmarsson) – 03:30
4. "Heilarokk" (Music: Hilmar Örn Agnarsson, Lyrics: Guðni Rúnar Agnarsson) – 05:38

=== Side 2 ===
1. "Svið" (Music: Þeyr, Lyrics: Hilmar Örn Hilmarsson) – 04:48
2. "Eftir Vígið" (Music: Hilmar Örn Agnarsson, Lyrics: Jóhann Sigurjónsson and Skuggi Þýddi) – 04:26
3. "Vítisdans" (Music: Sverrir Agnarsson, Lyrics: Skuggi Þýddi) – 03:40
4. "555" (Music: Þeyr, Lyrics: Hilmar Örn Hilmarsson) – 04:00

== Credits ==
=== Performers ===
==== Band members ====
- Magnús Guðmundsson – Vocals, guitar, keyboards and additional sounds.
- Elín Reynisdóttir – Vocals, backing vocals and screams.
- Hilmar Örn Agnarsson – Bass and keyboards.
- Jóhannes Helgason – Guitar.
- Sigtryggur Baldursson – Drums and percussion.

==== Collaborators ====
- Eiríkur Hauksson – Vocals (side 2, track 3)
- Vilborg Reynisdóttir – Background vocals
- Þorsteinn Magnússon – Guitar (side 1, track 3 and side 2, tracks 2 and 4)
- Sigurður Long and Daði Einarsson – Horns
- Eiríkur Örn Pálsson – Horns and Horn arrangement

=== Production ===
- Sigurður Árnason – Recording
- Hilmar Örn Agnarsson – Production
- Gunnar Vilhelmsson – Photography
- Kristján Einvarður Karlsson – Album design
- Kristján Einvarður Karlsson – Acknowledgement for his inspiring ideas on the songs development

== Notes ==
The track-listing translates to English as 1) But..., 2)...Except Joe, 3) Rung (or "Phoned"), 4) Brain-Rock, 5) Singed (sheep's head, an Icelandic delicacy), 6) After the Kill, 7) Hell-Dance, and 8) 555.
