= Niceland (band) =

Icelandic heavy metal band

Niceland, formerly Iceland, was an Icelandic heavy metal band established in 1983 by Jaz Coleman from Killing Joke and Icelandic band Þeyr.

== Origins ==
In 1982, Jaz Coleman, the leading vocalist of Killing Joke, moved to Iceland next to his guitarist Geordie Walker in pursuit of resurrecting the Icelandic rock scene. There, they contacted some musicians and started playing with Þeyr, which was an accomplished new wave group not only in Iceland, but in Scandinavia as well.
By 1982, Þeyr's lineup consisted of singer Magnús Guðmundsson, guitarists Guðlaugur Kristinn Óttarsson and Þorsteinn Magnússon, bassist Hilmar Örn Agnarsson, and drummer Sigtryggur Baldursson.

However, Þorsteinn Magnússon left the band to begin his own solo project, Stanya, soon releasing an album titled Líf. Singer Magnús took his place in the group.

== The establishment of Niceland ==
In 1983, Þeyr and Jaz Coleman formed a group called Iceland, but later the name was changed to Niceland by guitarist Guðlaugur Óttarsson.
Niceland rehearsed for a few weeks and after creating five songs they went to Hljóðriti studios and recorded only three. The group was dissolved after the recording sessions because Jaz had problems with alcohol and the band decided to write their own songs. Jaz joined guitarist Árni Kristjánsson and drummer Þórarinn Kristjánsson from the band Vonbrigði and played for a while until he reassembled Killing Joke with bassist Birgir Mogensen, and guitarists Guðlaugur and Geordie. They played for about two months, and then Jaz returned to Great Britain to reestablish Killing Joke.

Þorsteinn Magnússon returned to Þeyr and toured Scandinavia, but Þeyr broke up in July 1983 and its members followed different paths. The three tracks recorded by Niceland have remained as unpublished material up to present times.

== Recordings ==
- "Catalyst" (04:07)
- "Guess Again" (04:53)
- "Take What's Mine" (03:50)
