= Carl Moller =

Carl Moller may refer to:

- Carl Møller (1887–?), Danish rower and Olympic gold medalist
- Carl Möller (1857–1933), Swedish architect and public official
- Carl Moller (musician) on List of Bad Taste artists
