= Mjötviður Mær =

Studio album by Þeyr
- Released: 1981
- Genre: New wave
- Length: 32:38
- Label: Eskvímó; Cat. No.: ESQ 2
- Producer: Þeyr and Tony Cook

Þeyr chronology
Iður til Fóta (1981)	Mjötviður Mær (1981)	As Above... (1982)

Mjötviður Mær, released in 1981, is the second album by Icelandic new wave/rock group Þeyr. It was edited through Eskvímó in 12” vinyl.

Mjötviður Mær was Þeyr's most important work, according to the media. Formed by 12 songs, "Iss", "Þeir" and "2999" could be deemed as attempts to create a futuristic pop style thanks to voice distortions, keyboards and additional rhythm. “Úlfur” is a track that outstands due to its angry mood and thus became into one of the most famous.
Also important are, “Mjötviður”, an instrumental track and “Rúdolf”, a song loaded with rock anger and constitute an antifascist lampoon of Adolf Hitler.

This record was never reissued. However, some of its recordings appeared in Mjötviður til Fóta (2001), a special release to commemorate the 20 anniversary of Þeyr's reincarnation. This CD also featured recordings from the single Iður til Fóta (1981).

== Cover design and inserts ==
This album and their second work, As Above... had both exactly the same front covers, the only difference was the title. The image cover depicted a pentagram with the naked drummer inside it. It is a symbol that represents the interest in magic that their members had, and it is also a representation of the five-member band, and the perfect proportions of the human being, as defined by Leonardo da Vinci's Vitruvian Man.
The background photograph portrayed Keilir, a cone-shaped mountain located at the outskirts of Reykjavík and which is believed to have magic powers. The road shown on the image is Suðurgata.
This image is accompanied by runic writings which were taken from Völuspá.

The title refers to Scandinavian mythology, where the word Mjötviður, also known as Yggdrasil, means The Tree of Destiny, whose roots penetrate the three Underworld wells, and whose branches and foliage stretch throughout the whole Universe. The word Mær means Fair or Good.

The inserts of this album contain the lyrics to the songs and also feature several images related to magic and mathematics. Drawings of Pythagoras taken from Theorica Musica, by F. Gaffurio, represent the discovery of numeric relationships between harmonic sounds, known as Pythagorean tuning (see drawings). This is also complemented by other illustrations such as fragments of music writings from Alexander Scriabin’s Piano Sonata No. 3 in F sharp minor, Op. 23, engravings by Theodor de Bry from Robert Fludd's Utriusque Cosmi, and several pentagram illustrations, including Heinrich Cornelius Agrippa's pentagram taken from Three Books of Occult Philosophy which represents the golden symmetry of the human body. Other symbols featured are images of the Yggdrasil, drawings from Ancient Egypt, and satanic symbols, among others.

== Track listing ==
Track	Title	Length	Lyrics	Mp3
Side A
01	Úlfur	02:03	-	-
02	Iss	03:12	-	-
03	Current	03:15	-	-
04	2999	02:00	-	-
05	Mjötviður	02:55	-	-
06	Ópið	03:00	-	-
Side B
01	Þeir	03:35	-	-
02	Rúdolf	02:53	-	-
03	Never Suck (on Fun-Days)	02:40	-	-
04	Það er Nóg	02:28	-	-
05	Hva-Than	03:07	-	-
06	Ónefnt	02:50	-	-

== Track notes ==
- ”2999” is the same as “Technologos” in As Above... (1982).
- The tracks translate to English as 1. Wolf, 2. Duh! 3. Current, 4. 2999, 5. World Tree, 6. The Shout, 7. They, 8. Rudolf, 9. Never Suck, 10. That is Enough, 11. Hva-Than, 12. Unnamed.

== Credits ==
- Vocalist: Magnús Guðmundsson.
- Guitars: Guðlaugur Kristinn Óttarsson and Þorsteinn Magnússon.
- Bass: Hilmar Örn Agnarsson.
- Drums: Sigtryggur Baldursson.

Tracks:
1: Music: Þeyr. Lyrics: Magnús Guðmundsson.
2: Music: Hilmar Örn Agnarsson. Lyrics: Hilmar Örn Hilmarsson.
3: Music: Hilmar Örn Agnarsson. Lyrics: Hilmar Örn Hilmarsson.
4: Music and lyrics: Þorsteinn Magnússon.
5: Music: Þeyr.
6: Music and lyrics: Þorsteinn Magnússon.

7: Music: Hilmar Örn Agnarsson. Lyrics: Hilmar Örn Hilmarsson.
8: Music: Magnús Guðmundsson. Lyrics: Hilmar Örn Hilmarsson.
9: Music: Þeyr.
10: Music: Hilmar Örn Agnarsson. Lyrics: Hilmar Örn Hilmarsson.
11: Music and lyrics: Þorsteinn Magnússon.
12: Music and lyrics: Hilmar Örn Hilmarsson.

Characters on the record label: Sigga Vala.
Album, design and the wolf logo featured on the record label: Robert Guillemette.
Photographs: Gunnar Vilhelmsson.

Acknowledgement: Eyjólfur and Jóhannes Vestdal.
