= Fálkar (soundtrack) =

Soundtrack album by miscellaneous
- Released: 2002
- Genre: Pop
- Length: 42:22
- Label: Smekkleysa
- Producer: various

Fálkar is the soundtrack to Falcons (Fálkar is the Icelandic word for Falcons), which was directed by Friðrik Þór Friðriksson in 2002. With 12 tracks, this album contains a variety of Icelandic artists, from Hilmar Örn Hilmarsson, who was in charge of the music composition of the soundtrack, to Mínus, Múm, and Daníel Ágúst Haraldsson (member of GusGus), among others.

Megas appears in this album with the song "Edge and Over", his first English song which counted with the accompaniment of his long-time collaborator, Guðlaugur Kristinn Óttarsson in guitars. The film protagonist, Keith Carradine is featured here with two tracks of "Northern Light", one of them instrumental.

== Track listing ==
Track	Title	Artist	Length	Lyrics	Audio clips
01	Descent	Hilmar Örn Hilmarsson	02:17	-	-
02	Grasi Vaxin Göng	Múm	04:57	-	-
03	Northern Light	Keith Carradine	04:14	instrumental	-
04	Chimera	Mínus	02:28	-	-
05	Edge and Over	Megas	04:24	-	-
06	Epitaph	Leaves	05:12	-	-
07	Something Wrong	Bang Gang	02:54	-	-
08	Terra Firma	Hilmar Örn Hilmarsson	02:53	-	-
09	Virgin	Atingere	04:58	-	-
10	Sparks Fly	Daníel Ágúst Haraldsson	03:47	-	full
11	Northern Light	Keith Carradine	04:47	-	-
12	Ascent	Hilmar Örn Hilmarsson	02:11	-	-

== Credits ==
- Music composed, arranged and produced by: Hilmar Örn Hilmarsson
- Guitar: Guðlaugur Kristinn Óttarsson, Jón Þór Birgisson, Kristján Edelstein, and Orri Hardarson
- Bass: Georg Bjarnason, and Tómas Magnús Tómasson
- Percussion: Birgir Baldursson
- Cello: Stefán Örn Arnarson
- Sound Engineers: Georg Bjarnason, and Tómas Magnús Tómasson

Music recorded at the People’s Studio, Reykjavík

== See also ==
- Falcons, the movie directed by Friðrik Þór Friðriksson.
