= Sparks Fly =

Sparks Fly may refer to:

== Music ==
- Sparks Fly (album), a 2010 album by Miranda Cosgrove
- "Sparks Fly" (song), a 2011 song by Taylor Swift
- "Sparks Fly", a song by Daníel Ágúst Haraldsson from the Fálkar soundtrack album
- "Sparks Fly", a song by David Crowder Band from Illuminate
- "Sparks Fly", a song by Tiffany Giardina from No Average Angel
- "Sparks Fly", a song by Widespread Panic from Ball
- "Sparks Fly", a song by Waxahatchee from the 2017 album "Out in the Storm"

== Television ==
- "Sparks Fly", an episode of Million Dollar Listing Los Angeles
- "Sparks Fly", an episode of Astro Farm
- "Sparks Fly", an episode of Hart of Dixie

== Literature ==
- Sparks Fly, a 1948 children's novel by Helen O'Clery
- Sparks Fly, a 2012 novel in the Light Dragons series by Katie MacAlister
