= Haukur Morthens =

Icelandic singer

- Born: 17 May 1924; Reykjavík, Kingdom of Iceland
- Died: 13 October 1992 (aged 68)
- Occupation: Singer
- Labels: Faxafón; Fálkinn; HSH; SG-hljómplötur; Steinar

Gústav Haukur Morthens (17 May 1924 – 13 October 1992) was an Icelandic singer. He was one of the most beloved singers in Iceland in the second half of the 20th century. He began his singing career at Góðtemplarahúsið in 1944 before performing with several bands over the next years.

Haukur formed his own band in 1958 and then sang with it for the longest time. He went on singing tours to Denmark, Norway, Sweden, Finland, England, the Soviet Union, Canada, the United States and Austria and won prizes and recognition in several song competitions abroad.

== Personal life ==
Haukur was born at Þórsgata in Reykjavík, the son of Edvard Morthens, a Norwegian, and Rósa Guðbrandsdóttir. He had eight siblings. He was married to Ragnheiður Magnúsdóttir with whom had three children.

Haukur died on 13 October 1992 after prolonged illness.
