= Ragna Sigurðardóttir (author) =

Icelandic writer, translator and artist

Ragna (Ragnheiður) Sigurðardóttir (born in Reykjavík on 10 August 1962) is an Icelandic writer, translator and artist. She studied at the Jan Van Eyck Academie in the Netherlands and also spent time in Denmark. In addition she studied French and fine arts at Aix-en-Provence. In 1987 she debuted with a collection of her short stories and poems titled Stefnumót ("Date"), followed in by Fallegri en flugeldar ("More beautiful than fireworks", 1989), 27 herbergi ("27 rooms", 1991). Her debut novel Borg ("City", 1993), was nominated for the Icelandic Literature Prize, followed by Skot ("Shot", 1997), Strengir ("Strings", 2000), Hið fullkomna landslag ("The Perfect Landscape", 2009; translated into English by Sarah Bowen and published by Amazon Publishing in 2012), Bónusstelpan ("The Cashier", 2011), Vinkonur ("Girlfriends", 2016) and Þetta rauða, það er ástin (2022). In 2019, she published a collection of short stories, Vetrargulrætur ("Winter Roots"), which received unanimous praise from critics. In her career she has been long-listed for the International Dublin Literary Award.

She was married to the musician and allsherjargoði Hilmar Örn Hilmarsson from 1998-2024. They have two daughters together.

Ragna has worked as an art critic and as a literary translator from several languages (including Dutch, English and Danish) into Icelandic.
