= The Fourth Reich (EP) =

EP by Þeyr
- Released: 1982
- Genre: New wave
- Length: 13:10
- Label: Mjöt; Cat. No.: MJÖT 1
- Producer: Þeyr and Tony Cook

Þeyr chronology
| As Above... (1982) | The Fourth Reich (1982) | Lunaire (1983) |

The Fourth Reich was an EP released by the Icelandic new wave group Þeyr through Mjöt in 12" vinyl format.

For this work Þeyr recurred to a stronger use of percussion and rhythmic efforts than previous works, where the songs "Metamorphosis" and "Blood" outstands due to their deep percussive orientation.
This single was released in the UK through Shout.

== Banning in the UK ==
This EP was released in the UK through the label Shout but its original front cover was banned and replaced by a new one with black-colored background and just the title in red gothic characters. The name The Fourth Reich could lead to confusion because the title seems to suggest a continuation of the Third Reich. Actually, the image cover depicts Austrian psychiatrist and psychoanalysis Wilhelm Reich with a red armband similar to that used by the Nazis, but in this case, the armband had the symbol of the orgone physics, which represented duality and its origins in unity, referred by Reich as functionalism.
As a matter of fact, this release was a tribute to Reich, since Þeyr members were interested in his works. The back cover of this record also featured an image of Reich being escorted from the courthouse in Portland, Maine when he was arrested in 1956.

This image is accompanied by a German inscription which reads the following:
Gemäss der Verordung des Reichspräsidenten vom 28. Februar 1933 ist die Verteilung aller ausländischen Veröffentlichungen der politisch-psychologischen Reiche der Verleger für Sexualpolitik (Verlag für Sexualpolitik, Kopenhagen, Dänemark, ebenso, Prag, Tchechoslowakei und Zürich, Schweiz) im Reich bis auf weiteres verboten.*

Translation: According to the order by the Reich’s president on February 28, 1933 the distribution of all foreigners' publications pertaining the polito-psychological topics (Publishers for sexual politics, Copenhagen, Denmark, the same as Prague, Czechoslovakia and Zurich, Switzerland) has been forbidden from now on in the Reich.

The fragment refers to Reich’s book Mass Psychology of Fascism (1933), in which he claimed that fascism was the result of sexual repression. This book was banned soon after its publication in the same year that the Nazis took power.

== Track listing ==
| Track | Title | Length |
|---|---|---|
| 01 | Public | 03:25 |
| 02 | Metamorphosis | 03:43 |
| 03 | Zen | 03:42 |
| 04 | Blood | 03:00 |

== Credits ==
Performers:

- Vocalist: Magnús Guðmundsson
- Guitars: Guðlaugur Kristinn Óttarsson and Þorsteinn Magnússon
- Bass: Hilmar Örn Agnarsson
- Drums: Sigtryggur Baldursson
- Lyrics:
  - Track 1: lyrics by Magnús Guðmundsson
  - Tracks 2, 3 and 4: lyrics by Hilmar Örn Hilmarsson and Hilmar Örn Aganarsson
- Music: all songs by Þeyr.

== Video clip of "Blood" ==
In 1982 Þeyr did a television performance that has been considered as their first and unique clip. This video shows the band playing on the set accompanied by red-colored war footage that is intended to highlight the lyrics of the song. Magnús Guðmundsson, the vocalist appeared wearing make up and a cap, while bassist Hilmar Ö. Agnarsson is twisting around out of control. Guitarist Guðlaugur K. Óttarsson was frenziedly dancing at left of screen wearing a nightgown, while the other guitarist, Þorsteinn Magnússon was absent and replaced with a dummy. Drummer Sigtryggur Baldursson appeared in the back.
This video clip was widely unavailable until it was uploaded in MPEG2 format on the Internet in 2005.
