= Esquimaux Management =

Icelandic independent record label

Esquimaux Management (or Eskvímó) was an Icelandic independent record label created around 1981 by renowned composer Hilmar Örn Hilmarsson and Gunnar Ruðni Agnarsson, manager of new wave band Þeyr.
The company was in charge of the release of Þeyr’s records and books. Its owners performed with British bands in Iceland such as Eyless in Gaza.

Esquimaux cease operations in 1983 with the breakup of Þeyr. In 2001 the name of the company appeared in Mjötviður til Fóta, Þeyr’s 20th anniversary album. This was in order to reflect management's role in the history of the band. The commemorative album was produced under the direction of former Þeyr members and friends.

== Þeyr releases through Esquimaux ==
Year	Catalogue number	Title	Format	Notes
1981	EF 1	Life Transmission	7" vinyl	Jointly released with Fálkinn
1981	ESQ 1	Iður til Fóta	10" vinyl / cassette	-
1981	ESQ 2	Mjötviður Mær	12" vinyl / cassette	-
2001	Aleph 0	Mjötviður til Fóta	CD	Distributed by Edda

== See also ==
- List of record labels
