= Life Transmission =

EP by Þeyr
- Released: 23 April 1981
- Recorded: January – April 1981
- Genre: New wave
- Length: 7:54
- Label: Fálkinn/Eskvímó; Cat. No.: EF 1
- Producer: Þeyr and Tony Cook

Þeyr chronology
Þagað í Hel (1980)	Life Transmission (1981)	Iður til Fóta (1981)

Life Transmission, also known in Icelandic as Útfrymi (Ectoplasm) was a single released by Icelandic band Þeyr in 1981 through label Eskvímó.

It was formed by two songs: "Life Transmission", which was originally conceived as a "word sculpture" around the phrase "Life Transmission", although it is the final result of automatic writing and it was also the first song in English by the band. "Heima er Bezt", which means "Home is Best", was sung in Icelandic and is loaded with the reichian ravings of a young man trying to have sex with his female partner.

The tracks of this single were featured on Northern Lights Playhouse, a compilation released by label Fálkinn.
The record was dedicated to Ian Curtis of Joy Division (the title itself can be referred back to the Joy Division lyric "Radio...live transmission" from their own debut single).

== Track listing ==
Track	Title	Length	Lyrics	Audio clips
Side A
01	Life Transmission	03:43	-	-
Side B
02	Heima er Bezt	04:11	-	-

== Manifesto and the Scriabin ==
On 23 April 1981 Þeyr had a promotional concert at Hótel Borg. The gig included the use of a device called Scriabin which was designed by guitarist Guðlaugur Óttarsson. Therefore, the single came along with a plastic bag and information sheets explaining Þeyr purposes and the work of this device. Here is a translation from Icelandic:

Translation to page one:

Today, 23 April, is the official publishing day for a little vinyl record of the band Þeyr.

The publishing day, which is also the 1st day of summer, has a deeper meaning, as we have contemplated to introduce summer into the Icelandic music scene, through the chords and rhythms of this record: It is a document of the band’s efforts and subjects during the last four months, as well as an indication to the direction the band is aiming at.

However, in all modesty, we want to point out the fact, that all categorization or classification of Þeyr and their subjects, is not encouraged, and indeed very doubtful, as Þeyr have emphasized to see themselves in the broadest spectrum possible, and in the widest context possible; as we trace our roots into the Rada-music of Africa - through the Russian composers of the early 19th century - up to the four guys from Liverpool.

As we develop these primal elements at different speeds, one newer knows what will surface in the band’s next projects.

This little record is the result of four months of Þeyr’s work: ahead are still more months and still more plans.

With friendly regards and respect,
Þeyr.

Translation to page two:

Útfrymispoki
Ectoplasmic bag

Here tonight, there will be conducted an extraordinary experiment in both musical and mental innovation.
A specially designed machine will constantly broadcast a 13 note chord (F, D, F^{#}, A, C^{#}, F, A, C, E, A_{b}, C, E_{b}, G) one octave above the hearing range of the average human. Persons with extraordinary sensitive hearing do not have to worry, as the chord is very beautiful to listen to, - although dogs get tired after an hour or so. This chord is to be the background for the concert, and thus meant to create a unified mode among the guests - and to form an "invisible" connection among listeners. Because this chord and the mode of the concert as a whole can ignite a latent medium capacity in some people, we feel right to include a bag for ectoplasm with the tickets.

WARNING: DO NOT EXPOSE THE ECTOPLASM TO BRIGHT LIGHT

== Credits ==
Performers:
Vocalist: Magnús Guðmundsson.
Guitars: Guðlaugur Kristinn Óttarsson and Þorsteinn Magnússon.
Bass: Hilmar Örn Agnarsson.
Drums: Sigtryggur Baldursson.

Tracks:
1: Music: Hilmar Örn Agnarsson. Lyrics: Hilmar Örn Hilmarsson.
2: by Magnús Guðmundsson.
