= The Elgar Sisters =

Icelandic music duo

The Elgar Sisters was an Icelandic duo formed by singer Björk Guðmundsdóttir and composer Guðlaugur Kristinn Óttarsson in 1984. The Elgar Sisters coexisted with Kukl, another group they were part of.

The origin of the duo's name dates back to the recording sessions when engineer Mel Jefferson named the duo after English composer Edward Elgar.
From 1984 to 1986 the duo recorded 3 songs at Hjóðriti and 8 songs at Grettisgat studios (which later turned into Sýrland) which are known as The Elgar Sessions.

Nine songs were composed by Guðlaugur, one by Björk and one by the band. Besides Guðlaugur on electric and acoustic guitars and Björk as vocalist, some of the songs featured other musicians: Sigtryggur Baldursson (drums), Birgir Mogensen (bass), Einar Arnaldur Melax (keyboards), Hilmar Örn Hilmarsson (keyboards, percussion), and Þorsteinn Magnússon (guitars).
Some of the lyrics were taken from Dauðaljóðin (The Death Poems), a poetry book written by guitarist Þór Eldon Jónsson.

With the break-up of Kukl by mid 1986, the Elgar Sisters project was suspended, or up until the solo careers of Björk and Guðlaugur commenced.

== Recorded songs ==
Year of recording	Title	Music	Performers	Featured On
1984	Critical Mass^{1}	G. K. Óttarsson	Björk, G. K. Óttarsson, Siggi Baldursson, Birgir Mogensen and Einar Melax
1984	Patré	G. K. Óttarsson & Björk	Björk, G. K. Óttarsson, Hilmar Ö. Hilmarsson, and Þorsteinn Magnússon
1985	Dense Time	G. K. Óttarsson	Björk, G. K. Óttarsson, Siggi Baldursson, Birgir Mogensen and Einar Melax
1985	Horizontal^{2}	G. K. Óttarsson & Björk	Björk, G. K. Óttarsson, Siggi Baldursson, Birgir Mogensen and Einar Melax
1985	Zymphony	G. K. Óttarsson	G. K. Óttarsson
1986	Glóra	Björk	Björk	1993 - Big Time Sensuality (One Little Indian), single by Björk.
1986	Stígðu Mig	G. K. Óttarsson & Björk	Björk and G. K. Óttarsson	1993 - Venus as a Boy (One Little Indian), single by Björk.
1986	Síðasta Ég	G. K. Óttarsson & Björk	Björk and G. K. Óttarsson	1993 - Big Time Sensuality (One Little Indian), single by Björk.
1986	Quintessence	G. K. Óttarsson & Björk	Björk, G. K. Óttarsson and Hilmar Ö. Hilmarsson
1986	Sue	G. K. Óttarsson	Björk, G. K. Óttarsson, and Þorsteinn Magnússon
1986	Green	G. K. Óttarsson, Björk, Siggi Baldursson, Birgir Mogensen and Einar Melax	G. K. Óttarsson, Björk, Siggi Baldursson, Birgir Mogensen and Einar Melax

Track notes:
1: Renamed as “Mass” when it was performed by KUKL in 1985 with Einar Örn.
2: Also known as “Zontal” when rerecorded in 2005 for the Dense Time album.

== Alternate versions ==
- ”Sue”, with drums.
- ”Síðasta Ég”, with drums and no vocals.

== Featured On ==
- 1993 - Big Time Sensuality (One Little Indian), single by Björk.
- 1993 - Venus as a Boy (One Little Indian), single by Björk.
- 2002 - Family Tree (One Little Indian), CD box by Björk.
- 2005 - Dense Time (Academy of Industry and Arts), album by Guðlaugur K. Óttarsson.
