= Screaming Masterpiece =

2005 Icelandic documentary

- Directed by: Ari Alexander Ergis Magnússon
- Written by: Ari A. E. Magnússon
- Cinematography: Lance Bangs; Bergsteinn Björgúlfsson
- Music by: Björk; Hilmar Örn Hilmarsson; Mugison; Múm; Sigur Rós; Slowblow; Steindór Andersen; Ghostigital
- Release date: 2005
- Running time: 87 min.
- Country: Iceland
- Language: Icelandic

Screaming Masterpiece (Icelandic: Gargandi snilld) is a 2005 documentary film directed and written by Ari Alexander Ergis Magnússon about the music scene in Iceland. It attempts to explore the reasons why Iceland has such a rich variety of musical talent.

The film itself shows mostly live performances and interviews by some of Iceland's biggest musicians, including Björk, Sigur Rós, Slowblow, múm, Ghostigital, Quarashi, Singapore Sling amongst others, over the backdrop of Icelandic scenery. It contains also interview clips with the musician and goði Hilmar Örn Hilmarsson of the Íslenska Ásatrúarfélagið, the official Ásatrú religious organization of Iceland.

== See also ==
- Rokk í Reykjavík (1982) an earlier documentary on Iceland's music scene.
