= Með nöktum =

- Origin: Reykjavík, Iceland
- Genres: New wave, post-punk
- Years active: 1985
- Labels: Mjöt
- Past members: Magnús Guðmundsson; Halldór Lárusson; Ágúst Karlsson; Þorsteinn Magnússon; Birgir Mogensen; Lárus Grímsson; Halldór Jörgen Jörgensson; Björn Vilhámsson; Skúli Sverrisson

Með nöktum (With The Naked) was a short-lived Icelandic new wave band from the 1980s. After the demise of the occult post-punk band Þeyr, their vocalist Magnús Guðmundsson went on to form a group which continued the musical style of Þeyr. They only released one album in 1985 titled Skemmtun and split up just a short time afterwards.

Musically it follows the path of Þeyr's The Fourth Reich and the "Lunaire" single.
