= Mjötviður til Fóta =

Compilation album by Þeyr
- Released: 2001
- Recorded: 1981
- Genre: Rock
- Length: 34:58
- Labels: Esquimaux Management; Cat. No.: ALEPH 0
- Producers: Þeyr and Tony Cook

Þeyr chronology
Lunaire (1983)	Mjötviður til Fóta (2001)

Mjötviður til Fóta is an album released in 2001 to commemorate the 20th anniversary of the creation of Þeyr, one of Iceland’s most important bands of the early eighties.

Mjötviður til Fóta contains songs recovered from the album Mjötviður Mær and the single Iður til Fóta, two records released in 1981.
The material was originally recorded in 1981 at Studio Hljóðriti and it was digitized and mastered on October 25, 2001 at Stafræna Hljóðupptökufélaginu when guitarist and scientist Guðlaugur Kristinn Óttarsson took helm in the hot and cold thermal curating process where only analog thermometers were used.

Þeyr never reissued the other records, since the masters are believed to be lost and thus, the only recorded material of the band currently available is this release, as well as some other Icelandic compilations where few of their tracks are featured.

== Track listing ==
Track	Title	Length	Lyrics	Audio clips
01	Maggasýn	03:16	-	-
02	Bás 12	03:48	-	-
03	Tedrukkinn	03:27	-	full
04	Þeir	03:38	-	-
05	Úlfur	02:54	-	-
06	Ópið	02:58	-	-
07	Iss	03:13	-	-
08	Ónefnt	02:54	-	-
09	Það er Nóg	02:23	-	-
10	Current	03:24	-	-
11	Rúdolf	02:52	-	-
12	Mjötviður	02:51	instrumental	-

== Credits ==
Vocalist: Magnús Guðmundsson.
Guitar and electronic sounds: Guðlaugur Kristinn Óttarsson.
Guitar and vocals: Þorsteinn Magnússon.
Bass, keyboards, background vocals: Hilmar Örn Agnarsson.
Drums and background vocals: Sigtryggur Baldursson.

Production: Þeyr and Tony Cook.
Recording engineer: Tony Cook.
Artistic currents: Sigga Vala.
Prime time engineer and slogansmith: Hilmar Örn Hilmarsson.
Recording at: Stafræna Hjóðupptökufélaginu.
Under the direction of: Svein Kjartansson.
Digitizing supervisors: Guðlaugur Kristinn Óttarsson, Hilmar Örn Agnarsson and Hilmar Örn Hilmarsson.
Consultants: Guðmundur Bjarnason and Gunnar Smári Helgason.
Hot and cold thermal curation: Guðlaugur Kristinn Óttarsson.
Album, design and the wolf logo: Robert Guillemette.
Art direction: Hilmar Örn Hilmarsson.
Photographs: Gunnar Vilhelmsson.
Direction: Guðni Rúnar Agnarsson.
Acknowledgement: Vivan Hrefna Óttarsdóttir for her gastronomical heights and encouragements.
