= Drög að Upprisu =

Studio album by Megas
- Released: 1994
- Recorded: ???
- Genre: Pop/Rock
- Length: 75:26
- Label: Japis
- Producer: ???

Megas chronology
Paradísarfuglinn (1993)	Drög að Upprisu (1994)	Til Hamingju með Fallið (1996)

Drög að Upprisu is an album released in 1994 by Icelandic singer Megas. Formed by 16 tracks, this work counted with the collaboration of guitarist Guðlaugur Kristinn Óttarsson.

== Track listing ==
Track	Title	Length	Lyrics	Audio clips
01	Kór úr Joshua	03:02	-	-
02	Aðeins Smekksatriði	03:38	-	-
03	Silfur Egils	03:40	-	-
04	Þóttú Gleymir Guði	03:25	-	-
05	Orfeus og Evridís	05:30	-	-
06	Fegurðardrottning Fiskiðjuversins	05:09	-	-
07	Litlir Sætir Strákar	04:03	-	-
08	Ef Þú Smælar Framaní Heiminn	06:22	-	-
09	Undir Rós	05:28	-	-
10	Þóra	06:18	-	-
11	Krókudílamaðurinn	04:38	-	-
12	Paradísarfuglinn	05:07		-
13	Vörutalningarblús	04:11	-	-
14	Horfðu til Himins	04:19	-	-
15	Spáðu í Mig	05:27	-	-
16	Fatlafól	07:09	-	-
