= Reykjavik City Band =

Icelandic marching band

The Reykjavik City Band (Icelandic: Lúðrasveit Reykjavíkur) is a wind and marching band based in Reykjavík, Iceland. It is the oldest wind band in Iceland, founded on July 7, 1922, with the merger of the two wind bands in Reykjavik at the time, Harpa and Gígja. The band's headquarters are in a building called Hljómskálinn, situated by the lake Tjörnin, in downtown Reykjavík. Its current conductor is Lárus Halldór Grímsson.
