= Sateenkaarifilmi =

Finnish film production company

Sateenkaarifilmi Oy is a defunct Finnish film production company. It produced several films in the early 1980s, including Aidankaatajat eli heidän jälkeensä vedenpaisumus in 1982. The company was founded in 1979 and ceased to exist in 1999. It was part of the North Finland Film Commission.

== Production filmography ==
- 1980 – Lasse Viren
- 1980 – Täältä tullaan, elämä!
- 1981 – Elämän puolesta
- 1981 – Syöksykierre
- 1982 – Aidankaatajat eli heidän jälkeensä vedenpaisumus
- 1982 – Iso vaalee
- 1983 – Koomikko
