= Rokk í Reykjavík =

1982 Icelandic film by Friðrik Þór Friðriksson

- Directed by: Friðrik Þór Friðriksson
- Produced by: Hugrenningur
- Starring: Several Icelandic bands
- Music by: Various
- Distributed by: Íslenska kvikmyndasamsteypan
- Release date: April 1982 (Iceland)
- Running time: 83 min
- Country: Iceland
- Language: Icelandic

Rokk í Reykjavík is a documentary directed by Icelandic Friðrik Þór Friðriksson during the Icelandic winter of 1981-1982 and released for the local television in 1982.

With this documentary, Friðriksson showcases the alternative music scene through several performances of the post-punk/new wave most important bands at that time, taken from different concerts and sometimes accompanied by short interviews with musicians. The documentary portrays the lifestyle of young Icelanders opposing the establishment and advocating anarchy, as they try to find their own identity.

Rokk í Reykjavík is today considered one of the most important documentaries ever made about Icelandic music culture. It includes several bands who would go on to influence the music scene, such as Tappi Tíkarrass, a punk/pop band led by vocalist Björk Guðmundsdóttir performing two of their works: “Hrollur” and “Dúkkulísur”. The new wave band Þeyr, today considered one of the legendary Iceland bands of the early 1980s, is also featured with their songs “Rúdolf” and “Killer Boogie”, as is Einar Örn Benediktsson’s punk group Purrkur Pillnikk, also with two tracks: “Ovænt” and “Gluggagægir”.

Other important artists featured include Bubbi Morthens with his band Egó, Fræbbblarnir, Grýlurnar, and the renowned Sveinbjörn Beinteinsson with his chanting poem “Rímur”, among others.

As this film was the first Icelandic work in Dolby Stereo, it brought innovation to the Icelandic film industry. With Íslenska kvikmyndasamsteypan as the distributor, Rokk í Reykjavík was released in VHS format. The soundtrack to this film was released as a double LP compilation by Hugrenningur in April 1982.

The cover artwork depicts singer Björk performing with Tappi Tíkarrass.

In July 2008 the movie was released on DVD by Sena in Iceland only.

== Songs ==
Track	Title	Length	Artist
01	Ó Reykjavík	02:25	Vonbrigði
02	Sieg Heil	01:10	Egó
03	Gotta Go	01:45	Fræbbblarnir
04	Óvænt	01:07	Purrkur Pillnikk
05	Rúdolf	02:49	Þeyr
06	Creeps	01:48	Q4U
07	Breyttir Tímar	02:20	Egó
08	Where are the Bodies	05:08	Bodies
09	Hrollur	02:25	Tappi Tíkarrass
10	Moving Up to a Motion	03:15	Baraflokkurinn
11	Talandi Höfuð	02:55	Spilafífl
12	Í Speglinum	03:25	Þursaflokkurinn
13	Í Kirkju	02:42	Friðryk
14	Lífið og Tilveran	03:25	Start
15	Gullúrið	03:10	Grýlurnar
16	Sat ég Inni á Kleppi	03:42	Egó
17	Gluggagægir	03:00	Purrkur Pillnikk
18	Dúkkulísur	02:40	Tappi Tíkarrass
19	Bereft	03:18	Mogo Homo
20	Hver er svo sekur?	02:35	Jonee Jonee
21	Killer Boogie	02:45	Þeyr
22	Kick Us Out of the Country	01:55	Bodies
23	Af Því Pabbi Vildi Það	01:43	Jonee Jonee
24	Í Nótt	01:48	Fræbbblarnir
25	Guðfræði	03:00	Vonbrigði
26	Stórir Strákar	02:40	Egó
27	Gonna Get You	01:26	Q4U
28	Toys	01:57	Q4U
29	Lollipops	02:50	Sjálfsfróun
30	Antichrist	01:10	Sjálfsfróun
31	Sjálfsfróun	01:30	Sjálfsfróun
32	Af Litlum Neista Verður Mikið Mál	02:30	Bruni BB
33	Rímur	02:00	Sveinbjörn Beinteinsson

== Credits ==
=== Personnel ===
Direction: Friðrik Þór Friðriksson.
Cinematography and lightning: Ari Kristinsson.
Other shooting personnel: Árni Páll Jóhannsson, Baldur Hrafnkell Jónsson, Friðrik Þór Friðriksson, Jón Karl Helgason, Magnús Magnússon, Peter Auspin, Richard Crowe, Sigurður Grímsson, Sigurður Snæberg Jónsson, Sigurjón Sighvatsson, Vilhjálmur Knudsen and Þorgeir Gunnarsson.
Recording engineers from Þursabit recording studio: Júlíus Agnarsson, Tómas Magnús Tómasson, Þórður Árnason.
Sound: Jón Karl Helgason.
Edition: Ari Kristinsson, Kristín Pálsdóttir, Peter Auspin, Richard Crowe, Sigurður Grímsson, Sigurður Jón Ólafsson, Sigurður Snæberg Jónsson.
Executive board: Þorgeir Gunnarsson.
Mixing: Alan Snelling, Þórður Árnason.
Sound production: Anvil Studios, Abbey Road, London.
Video production: Johan Ankerstjerne a/s, Kaupmannahöfn.
Distributor: Íslenska kvikmyndasamsteypan.

Soundtrack: Title: Rokk í Reykjavík. Label: Hugrenningur in 1982. Reissue: in 1993 by Bad Taste.

== See also ==
- 1982 - Rokk í Reykjavík (Hugrenningur), the soundtrack.
- 2005 Screaming Masterpiece documentary about Iceland's music scene.
