= Crowleymass =

EP by Current 93
- Released: 1987
- Recorded: 1987
- Genre: Hip hop, industrial
- Length: 13:44
- Label: Maldoror
- Producer: Hilmar Örn Hilmarsson

Current 93 chronology
| Happy Birthday Pigface Christus (1987) | Crowleymass (1987) | The Red Face of God (1988) |

Crowleymass is an EP released in 1987 by the English group Current 93, led by David Tibet. Crowleymass originally appeared on a 12” vinyl record through Maldoror and was later reissued in 1997 on CD format through Durtro, the record company owned by David Tibet. This reissue contained a bonus track titled “I Arise”.
With four songs, this record was produced by Icelandic renowned musician Hilmar Örn Hilmarsson and had the collaboration of guitar player Guðlaugur Kristinn Óttarsson; former Strawberry Switchblade backing vocalist Rose McDowall, J. Sen and Nyarlathotep's Idiot Flute Players.

With a more danceable orientation as compared with previous works (excepting the uncharacteristically heavy metal-like "I Arise"), Crowleymass is considered a cult collectible by gothic rock and industrial music followers.

== 12" track listing ==
| Track | Title | Length | Lyrics | Audio clips |
|---|---|---|---|---|
| 01 | "Crowleymass" | 4:17 | - | - |
| 02 | "As for the Other Side (Christmassacre)" | 2:17 | - | - |
| 03 | "Crowleymass (Mix Mix Mix)" | 7:05 | - | - |

== CD track listing ==
| Track | Title | Length | Lyrics | Audio clips |
|---|---|---|---|---|
| 01 | "Crowleymass" | 4:17 | - | - |
| 02 | "As for the Other Side (Christmassacre)" | 2:17 | - | - |
| 03 | "Crowleymass (Mix Mix Mix)" | 7:05 | - | - |
| 04 | "I Arise" | 11:36 | - | - |
