= Nóttin Langa =

Studio album by Bubbi Morthens
- Released: 1989
- Genre: Pop/rock
- Length: 43:52
- Label: Geisli
- Producer: Lamarnir Ógurlegu

Bubbi Morthens chronology
Hver er Næstur? (1989)	Nóttin Langa (1989)	Sögur af Landi (1990)

Nóttin Langa is an album released on 15 November 1989 by Icelandic working class singer Bubbi Morthens. This pop album went to the market from Geisli.
Formed by 12 songs Nóttin Langa counted with the participation of guitarist Guðlaugur Kristinn Óttarsson.

== Track listing ==
Track	Title	Length	Lyrics	Audio clips
01	Háflóð	04:00	-	-
02	Sagan Endurtekur Sig	04:44	-	-
03	Friðargarðurinn	04:37	-	-
04	Sextíu og Átta	03:18	-	-
05	Tíu Fingur Ferðast	02:52	-	-
06	Stríðsmenn Morgundagsins	03:14	-	-
07	Þau Vita Það	04:47	-	-
08	Skrifað Í Snjóinn	03:56	-	-
09	Þú Varst Svo Sæt	03:36	-	-
10	Ég er Að Bíða	03:44	-	-
11	Mér Stendur Ekki	03:51	-	-
12	Ég Vil Fá Þína Sál	3:53		-
