= Lárus Halldór Grímsson =

Icelandic composer and musician (born 1954)

Lárus Halldór Grímsson (born December 13, 1954) is an Icelandic composer and musician. He is known mostly for his electronic compositions with traditional instruments but he has been writing more non-electronic works since 1990. He has composed much of his music for theatre and television.

Lárus began studying the flute in the Skólahljómsveit Vesturbæjar children's wind band and music school in Western Reykjavík (now Skólahljómsveit Vesturbæjar og Miðbæjar) when he was ten. He attended the Reykjavík College of Music from 1972 to 1977. There he concentrated mostly on the flute, but also learned to play keyboards. He played on both instruments with several bands in the 1970s, the most famous being Eik, one of the first Icelandic bands to write all their own songs.

In 1979 he began studies at the Institute of Sonology (Instituut voor Sonologie) in Utrecht, in the Netherlands. After finishing his studies there in 1984, he worked at the institute for some time.

Lárus' compositions include many works for theatre and television, including the play Næturgalann, which has been performed at most primary schools in Iceland, and films including Hringurinn (The Ring Road) and Skammdegi (Dark Season). He is the only composer working in Iceland who uses elements of jazz and pop idioms in a classical context.

He has been director and conductor of the Skólahljómsveit Vesturbæjar og Miðbæjar since 1994, and conductor of the Reykjavik City Band (Lúðrasveit Reykjavíkur) since 1998, and has composed five major works for the latter. He also headed the Association of Icelandic Wind and Brass Bands (Samband Íslenskra lúðrasveita) for six years. He teaches flute, clarinet and saxophone at the Skólahljómsveit Vesturbæjar og Miðbæjar and the Seltjarnarnes School of Music.
