= Iður til Fóta =

EP by Þeyr
- Released: 1981
- Recorded: 13:46
- Genre: New wave
- Length: ??:??
- Label: Eskvímó; Cat. No.: ESQ 1
- Producer: Þeyr and Tony Cook

Þeyr chronology
Life Transmission (1981)	Iður til Fóta (1981)	Mjötviður Mær (1981)

Iður til Fóta was a single released in 1981 by the Icelandic group Þeyr through Eskvímó and it was edited in 10" format.
The title translates as "Moving Your Feet" but in Icelandic also forms a pun which can equally translate as "Guts at Your Feet".

This record was never reissued since the masters are believed to be lost. However, in 2001 some of its recordings appeared in Mjötviður til Fóta, a CD to commemorate the 20th anniversary of the creation of Þeyr. The title of this CD also combined the name of Mjötviður Mær (1981), the other album included.

== The front and back covers ==
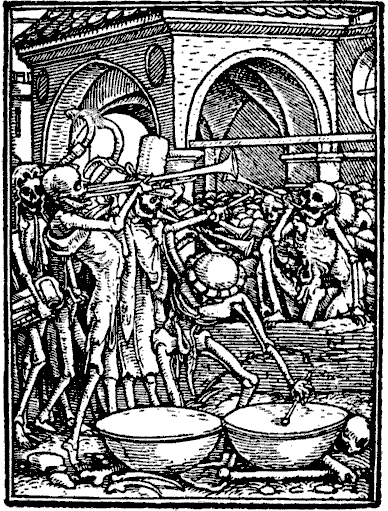
Beinhaus from the Totentanz (Dance of Death).

The front cover, which was designed by Hilmar Örn Hilmarsson, depicts a dancer being hypnoptized by a man who points at her and shows a geometric shape on her head. This illustration was intended to represent the hypnotizing effect of Þeyr's music towards the audience.

The back cover depicts a German inscription, here translated:
The fall of Asgard on Atlantis.
The Ragnarök of the Edda and "the thousand-year empire of God on Earth" according to Daniel, Ezekiel and John's Book of Revelation.

This text is followed by two quotations from the Bible written in Latin:
Væ væ væ habitantibus in terra. Apocalypsis VIII

Cuncta in quibus spiraculum vitæ est mortua sunt. Genesis VII

Where the first quotation refers to The Seventh Seal and means Woe! Woe! Woe to the inhabitants of the earth (Apocalypsis 8:13). The second quotation refers to The Flood and translates as follows: Everything on dry land that had the breath of life in its nostrils died. (Genesis 7:22)

These writings are complemented by an illustration of the Beinhaus (House of Bones) taken from a series of drawings of the Totentanz (Dance of Death).

== 10" record track listing ==
Track	Title	Length	Lyrics	Audio clips
01	Bás 12	03:48	-	-
02	Maggasýn	03:16	-	-
03	Tedrukkinn	03:27	-	full
04	Ariareggae	03:55	-	-

== Cassette track listing ==
Length time: 28:32

Track	Title	Length	Lyrics	Mp3
Side A
01	Bás 12	03:48	-	-
02	Maggasýn	03:16	-	-
03	Tedrukkinn	03:27	-	full
04	Ariareggae	03:55	-	-
Side B
01	Brennu-Njálssaga	14:46	-	-

== Credits ==
Music and lyrics:
1 Magnús Guðmundsson.
2: Hilmar Örn Agnarsson and Magnús Guðmundsson.
3: Hilmar Örn Agnarsson.
4: Þeyr.

Performers: Vocalist: Magnús Guðmundsson.
Guitars: Guðlaugur Kristinn Óttarsson and Þorsteinn Magnússon.
Bass: Hilmar Örn Agnarsson.
Drums: Sigtryggur Baldursson.

Other collaborators:
Cover design: Hilmar Örn Hilmarsson.

== Notes ==
- The tracks Bas 12 and Tedrukkin are the same as Dead / Undead and Are you Still There? that appear on the later album As Above, only here the vocal tracks were recorded in English.
- The titles translate as 1.Booth Twelve, 2.Magga's Vision, 3. Tea-Drunk (or "Drunk on Tea") and 4. Aryan Reggae.
