= Aidankaatajat eli heidän jälkeensä vedenpaisumus =

- Directed by: Olli Soinio
- Written by: Olli Soinio
- Produced by: Tapio Suominen
- Starring: Erkki Pajala
- Cinematography: Pekka Aine
- Music by: Asser Fagerström
- Distributed by: Suomi-Filmi
- Release date: 20 August 1982
- Running time: 104 minutes
- Country: Finland
- Language: Finnish

Aidankaatajat eli heidän jälkeensä vedenpaisumus is a 1982 Finnish comedy film drama directed and written by Olli Soinio. Starring Erkki Pajala, Martti Kainulainen and Toivo Tuomainen.

The film was premiered on 20 August 1982 in Finland. The film premiered in Sweden in March 1983.

The film was produced by Sateenkaarifilmi and distributed by Suomi-Filmi.

== Cast ==
- Erkki Pajala as Tauno Hartman
- Martti Kainulainen as Oiva Vaittinen
- Toivo Tuomainen as Onni Akseli Kurki
- Anselmi
- Matti Aro as Distinguished guest
- Helen Elde
- Tuija Ernamo
- Asser Fagerström
- Susanna Haavisto as Kirsti
- Aulis Hämäläinen
- Heikki Holopainen
- Heikki Huopainen as Male nurse
- Seija Kareinen
- Lilga Kovanko
- Matti Kuortti
- Martin Kurtén as City legislator
- Soli Labbart as Old housemaid
- Kauko Laurikainen as Policeman
- Paavo Liski as Psychiatrist
- Olavi Naaralainen
- Voitto Nurmi
- Arja Pessa
- Tuija Piepponen
- Paavo Piskonen
- Erik Pöysti
- Aulis Rosendahl
- Ismo Saario as Stepson
- Elvi Saarnio
- Antti Tarkiainen
- Matti Tuominen
- Uolevi Vahteristo
- Matti Varjo
- Arno Virtanen
- Pauli Virtanen

== See also ==
- List of Finnish films
