= Þursaflokkurinn =

Icelandic rock band

- Origin: Reykjavík, Iceland
- Genres: Progressive rock; psychedelic rock; jazz fusion; folk rock; new wave
- Years active: 1978–1984; 1991; 2008
- Labels: Steinar; Spor
- Past members: Egill Ólafsson; Tómas Tómasson; Ásgeir Óskarsson; Rúnar Vilbergsson; Þórður Arnason; Karl Sighvatsson

Þursaflokkurinn (English: the group of hobgoblins), often written in a simplified way ("Thursaflokkurinn"), were an Icelandic progressive rock group that was mainly active in the late 1970s and early 1980s. Similar to the Dutch band Focus, Þursaflokkurinn combined rock music with influences of classical music and jazz, enhancing their sound by adding elements of Scandinavian folk music and sometimes eccentric vocals resembling the Rock in Opposition work of, for instance, the Swedish band Samla Mammas Manna.

Since their foundation in Reykjavík in 1978, the group consisted of Egill Ólafsson (vocals, keyboards) and acoustic guitar, guitarist Þórður Arnason, bassoonist Rúnar Vilbergsson, bassist Tómas Magnús Tómasson and drummer Ásgeir Óskarsson.

Between 1978 and 1980, the band mainly played progressive rock with influences of folk, psychedelic and jazz rock. Most of the songs are based on Icelandic folk songs; especially the debut album includes many traditional folk tunes which have all been given a progressive rock arrangement.

The second album Þursabit has more psychedelic influences than the 'folkier' debut album and also features more prominent keyboards, for example the Hammond organ (played by the newly recruited keyboarder Karl Sighvatsson) and the electric piano.

The band's 1980 tour is documented by the live album Á hljómleikum and imports jazz influences into the band's music. A punk rock track at the end of the album became a popular and well-known song in Iceland.

On their fourth album, Gæti eins verið... from 1982, the band had switched style completely into playing new wave music. The acoustic instruments were nearly completely substituted by synthesizers; keyboarder Karl Sighvatsson and bassoonist Rúnar Vilbergsson had left the band.

After some recording sessions for a new album in 1983 and 1984, the band split. One reason was that the band's success did not spread outside Iceland. Egill Ólafsson started working as a writer and was a member of the band Stuðmenn in which other Þursaflokkurinn musicians also played.

Sometimes the band met again for one-off performances, for example for the memorial for Karl Sighvatsson, who died in 1991.

For the band's 30th anniversary in February 2008, all their albums were reissued in a mini-vinyl-box with a CD full of previously unissued tracks and live versions. In addition, there was a tour through Iceland in early 2008 with the Caput chamber orchestra; a live CD-DVD was issued in late November 2008 with the title Hinn íslenski Þursaflokkur og Caput.

== Discography ==
- Hinn íslenzki Þursaflokkur (1978)
- Þursabit (1979)
- Á hljómleikum (1980)
- Gæti eins verið... (1982)
- Nútíminn - Bestu lög Þursaflokksins 1978-1982 (best of collection) (2000)
- Þursar (all the four albums from 1978 to 1982) (2008)
  - includes: Ókomin forneskjan (outtake collection)
- Hinn íslenski Þursaflokkur og Caput (2008)
