= Egó =

- Origin: Reykjavík, Iceland
- Genres: Rock; Blues; Punk
- Years active: 1981–1984
- Members: Bubbi Morthens; Bergþór Morthens; Þorleifur Guðjónsson; Magnús Stefánsson; Tómas Magnús Tómasson
- Past members: Jóhann Ridar; Ragnar Sigurðsson

Egó was a musical band founded in Reykjavík, Iceland), in the fall of 1981 by Bubbi Morthens with his younger brother and guitarist Bergþór Morthens and their friend, bassist Þorleifur Guðjónsson. Egó's first drummer was Jóhann Richards (aka "Motorhead"), and for a while guitarist Ragnar Sigurðsson played along with them. Jóhann and Ragnar were replaced by drummer Magnús Stefánsson and Tómas Magnús Tómasson. Bubbi Morthens, the frontman and main lyricist in the band had been part of influential punk/rock/reggie band Utangarðsmenn, but had been fired from the band for reportedly having a "big ego", which was also allegedly the reason for the band name "Egó".

== History ==
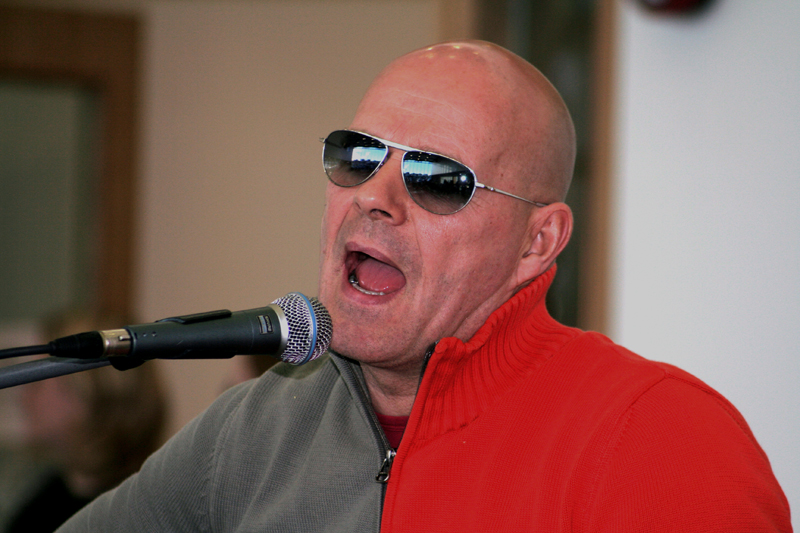
Bubbi Morthens, founder and lead singer of Egó

Egó's first tour was in Reykjavík. Their debut album, Breyttir Tímar was released on April 1, 1982, and it quickly became one of the best selling albums in Icelandic music history. It reached second place on the Icelandic album chart and stayed in the top ten for 19 weeks straight. During the promotional tour for the album, Þorleifur quit the band and was replaced by former Utangarðsmenn bassist, Rúnar Erlingsson.

Egó's second album Í Mynd, came out in late 1982. It was considered by most people to be better than the previous album. However, they lost a big part of their sound when Magnús Stefánsson decided to leave the band on tour in Scandinavia. He was replaced by Jökull Úlfsson. Also, the keyboard player Gunnar Rafnsson joined the band. Both Bubbi and Magnús have said in interviews that they don't have any recollections or memories whatsoever from this time period; mostly because they were all in deep drug use at the time.

Finally it was internal conflicts within the band that led to its demise. The relationship between Egó and their record label had also gotten to the point where Egó had broken up as a group, but still recorded one more album due to the contract they had previously signed. According to this contract, they were obligated to release one more album, which did not get very good reviews. Most people believe that at this point in their career, Egó were fed up with each other and only did the third album to satisfy the record label, not out of their own willingness or excitement to make a new record.

After the release of the self-titled third album (released under the working title "Bless" or "Goodbye") the band broke up. However, in 2001, the members of Egó reunited to release a compilation under the title of Frá Upphafi til Enda.

Later in 1984, Bubbi returned to Iceland and formed a rock and roll band called Das Kapital and released an album called Lili Marlene. Only he has had any success or fame since Egó broke up, as he to this day has released many solo albums, mostly with acoustic guitar oriented pop / rock music. Also, it should be mentioned that Magnús Stefánsson has been credited by many people as the best Icelandic punk rock drummer ever. A few years after leaving Egó on tour in Scandinavia, he joined one of Iceland's most successful pop/rock/funk bands; Sálin hans Jóns míns.

== Discography ==
=== Albums ===
- 1982: "Breyttir Tímar"
- 1982: "Í Mynd"
- 1984: "Egó"
- 2009: "6. október"

=== Singles ===
- 2009: "Í hjarta mér" (7 weeks in Iceland No. 1 on Tónlist)
- 2009: "Eyjan græna" (1 week in Iceland at No. 1 on Tónlist)
