= Fræbbblarnir =

Icelandic band

Fræbbblarnir (Note: A deliberate misspelling of fræflarnir (the stamens).) is an Icelandic punk-pop musical group. They were formed in Iceland in 1978 and released a number of records until they quit early in 1983. A punk-pop band playing short, melodic songs fast and raw, they were inspired by the Ramones, Clash, Stranglers, Jam, Sex Pistols, Damned, Alberto Y Lost Trios Paranoias, Stiff Little Fingers, Undertones, Buzzcocks, Crass, Elvis Costello, Ian Dury and the rest of the early punk and New Wave scene, as well as 1960s bands like the Kinks and Troggs. They appeared in the documentary Rokk í Reykjavík, and the album “Viltu nammi væna?” is regarded as a classic.

Its members continued playing on and off under various names until a compilation album was released by Smekkleysa (“Bad Taste”) in 1996, when the original band was re-formed.

The band is still active.

== Members ==
Current

- Valgarður Guðjónsson: lead vocals, guitar (1978–present)
- Arnór 'Assi' Snorrason: guitar (1981, 1996–present)
- Ríkharður H. Friðriksson: guitar (1978-1979, 2012-present)
- Helgi Briem: bass guitar (2001–present)
- Guðmundur Þór Gunnarsson: drums (2009–present)
- Iðunn Magnúsdóttir: vocals (1996–present)

Former

- Stefán Karl Guðjónsson: drums (1978-2009)
- Kristín Reynisdóttir: backing vocals (1996-2005)
- Brynja Scheving: backing vocals (1996-2005)
- Dagný Zoëga: backing vocals (1978)
- Óskar Þórisson: vocals (1978)
- Ellert Ellertsson: bass guitar (1996-2000)
- Tryggvi Þór Tryggvason: guitar (1980-1982, 1996-2000)
- Steinþór Stefánsson: bass guitar (deceased) (1980-1983)
- Kristinn Steingrímsson: guitar (1981-1982)
- Þorsteinn Hallgrímsson: bass guitar (1978-1980)
- Ari Einarsson: guitar (1979-1980)
- Hálfdán Þór Karlsson: guitar (1978)
- Barði Valdimarsson: guitar (1978)

== Discography ==
- False Death, EP, (1980)
- Viltu Nammi Væna, album, (1980)
- Bjór, EP, (1981)
- Poppþéttar melódíur í rokkréttu samhengi, album, (1982)
- Warkweld In The West, EP, (1982)
- Viltu Bjór Væna, compilation album, (1996)
- Dásamleg sönnun um framhaldslíf , album, (2000)
- Heaven Needed a Lead Singer, song on compilation album, (2001)
- Dót, album, (2004)
- Í hnotskurn, album, (2015)
