= Bad Taste (record label) =

Icelandic record label

Bad Taste Ltd.
- Founded: 1986; 40 years ago
- Founder: Ásmundur Jónsson; Einar Örn Benediktsson; Bragi Ólafsson; Friðrik Erlingsson; Þór Eldon; Ólafur Engilberts; Sigtryggur Baldursson; Björk Guðmundsdóttir
- Genre: Various
- Country of origin: Iceland
- Location: Reykjavík, Iceland
- Official website: smekkleysa.net

Bad Taste (known as Smekkleysa in Icelandic, literally Tastelessness) is an Icelandic independent record label located in Reykjavík, that also publishes poetry books, short films, greeting cards and Icelandic gifts. It is home to The Sugarcubes.

== History ==
After the bankruptcy of Gramm Records, and the demise of Kukl, Einar Örn Benediktsson, one of the vocalists of Kukl and Ásmundur Jónsson from Gramm, with some of the former musicians from Kukl and members of surrealistic group called Medúsa, convened to create a record company called Smekkleysa in 1986. Later, it was renamed to its English translation, Bad Taste, after Pablo Picasso's manifesto: "Good taste and frugality are the enemies of creativity".

Smekkleysa's first work was a postcard drawn by Friðrik Erlingsson, who at that time was the guitar player of Sykurmolarnir (Icelandic for The Sugarcubes), a band led by Einar Örn and Björk. This piece of art contained the faces of Mikhail Gorbachev and Ronald Reagan, a map of Iceland and the flags of the USSR and the United States as background, due to the Reykjavík Peace Summit that was to take place by October, 1986. Around 5,000 copies of this image were sold and the funds were used by the group to release their first record, a 7" vinyl single by Sykurmolarnir titled Einn Mol'á Mann ("One Cube per Person") which contained the Icelandic versions of "Birthday" and "Cat", two songs that would appear later on their first album, Life's Too Good in 1987 through Elektra Records; an album that served to boost the international acclaim of The Sugarcubes. However, Einn Mol'á Mann did not sell as expected, because alternative music had always had difficulty reaching the public and most of the bands from the underground scene used to sell their works at cafés. Until 2000, this single was still available from the Ordering Department created in 1992.

When The Sugarcubes achieved an agreement with One Little Indian Records, a new record company created by Derek Birkett, their incomes increased with the release of Birthday, the first single published in England, which was chosen as single of the week by Melody Maker.

All the money earned by The Sugarcubes was primarily used for more projects and to support new bands to escort The Sugarcubes when touring. But by the end of the eighties, it was clear that the end of The Sugarcubes was coming, and Björk released a jazz record in 1990 titled Gling-Gló in a short-lived group called Björk Guðmundsdóttir & Tríó Guðmundar Ingólfssonar.

The growth of Bad Taste slowed after The Sugarcubes broke up in 1992, and even though it had a subsequent contract with Sigur Rós, the band moved to an English label (although Bad Taste still handles their Icelandic market). This was because Bad Taste's contracts allowed artists' freedom to choose to record their next work in another label. Today, things are different and Bad Taste has first rights to the next album of any artist they produce, although they give full artistic freedom.

Other Bad Taste projects were to include a radio station called Skratti ("Devil"), a restaurant called Drullupytturinn ("The Mud Pit"), but neither of these became reality. A record store named after the company exists in midtown Reykjavík, and the Smekkleysa mail order service has been running for over 15 years. The mail order handles all available Smekkleysa titles, plus selected Icelandic music released by other labels.

== See also ==
- List of record labels
- List of Bad Taste artists
