= Fálkinn =

Icelandic record label

Fálkinn (Icelandic pronunciation: [ˈfaul̥cɪn], lit. 'The Falcon') was an Icelandic record label. The label's only well known original release was Björk's 1977 eponymous juvenile album Björk. The record led to national success and recognition for Björk, acting as the starting point for her musical career. Fálkinn is sometimes used as the title for the album as the album did not have an official title.

Fálkinn was also the local distributor of EMI, Polygram, and Island Records releases.
