= Sigtryggur Baldursson =

Icelandic musician

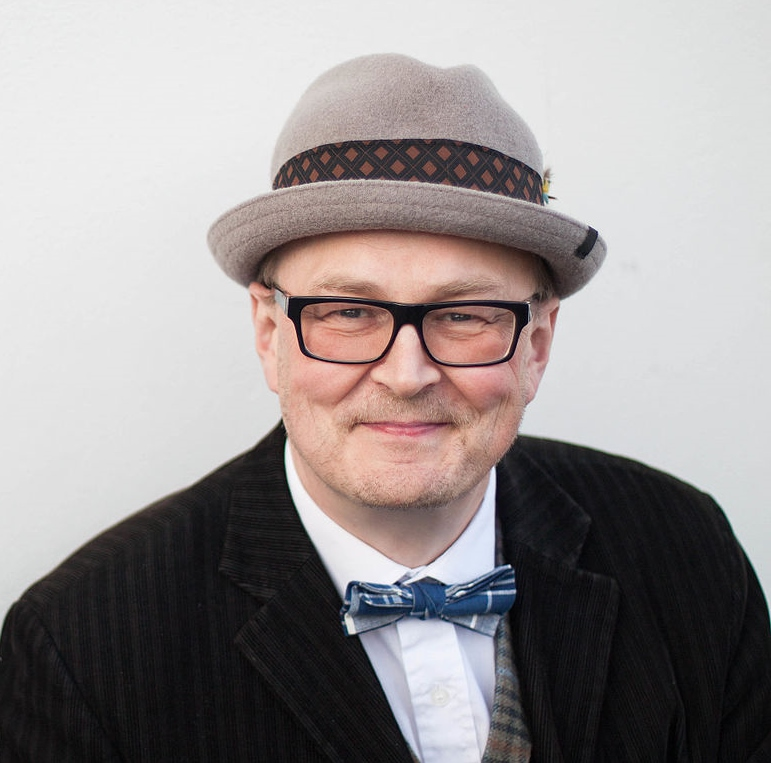
- Sigtryggur in 2012

Background information
- Born: 2 October 1962 (age 63); Norway
- Occupations: Drummer; singer
- Instrument: Drums
- Years active: 1975–present
- Formerly of: The Sugarcubes; Þeyr; Kukl; Reptile Palace Orchestra

Sigtryggur Baldursson (born 2 October 1962) is an Icelandic drummer and singer.

Sigtryggur was born in Norway to Icelandic parents. He was a founding member of the Sugarcubes and has been a longtime fixture on the Icelandic punk and alternative music scene. Other bands he has played in have included Þeyr, Kukl, Emiliana Torrini, Ben Frost, Kippi Kaninus, SJS BIGBAND, Headpump, Bradley Fish and the Reptile Palace Orchestra. He has played on numerous recording with many artists, Howie B, and Les Negresses Vertes to name a few. He also has recorded under the name of Bogomil Font, his own crooner alter ego.

Sigtryggur made a record with the late Jóhann Jóhannsson in 1999, the project was called Dip and the record was "Hi- camp meets lo - fi.

He made two records under the name of Steintryggur with Steingrímur Guðmundsson. The two also had a percussion group called Parabolur from 2005, along with longtime collaborator Guðmundur Vignir Karlsson of Kippi Kaninus.

Sigtryggur also has a number of filmography-related accomplishments to his credit, including soundtracks for Rokland (Stormland) 2011, One Point O (2004) and Takedown (2000), acting as the Drummer in Monkey Drummer (2000) by English director Chris Cunningham, and working as a sound recordist for an episode of the documentary television series Naked Science. He has also produced "Hljómskálinn", a TV series on Icelandic music for RUV, the Icelandic national television station.

He has written music for theater productions in Iceland, namely Enron (2010) and Chekov's The Cherry Orchard (2011) in the Reykjavik City Theatre.

From 2012 he has been the managing director for ÚTÓN / Iceland Music (formerly Iceland Music Export (IMX))
