= Björk: Sonic Symbolism =

- Genre: Music
- Format: Talk show; Conversation podcast
- Language: English; Icelandic

Creative team
- Created by: Björk; Asi Jónsson; Oddný Eir; Ian Wheeler; Julie Douglas; Christian Koons

Cast and voices
- Hosted by: Björk; Oddný Eir; Ásmundur Jónsson

Production
- Production: Mailchimp; Talkhouse
- Length: 40-50 min (per episode)

Publication
- No. of episodes: 9
- Original release: September 1, 2022 – October 13, 2022

Related
- Website: mailchimp.com/presents/podcast/sonic-symbolism/

Björk: Sonic Symbolism is a podcast featuring Icelandic singer-songwriter and actress Björk in conversation with philosopher and writer Oddný Eir and musicologist Ásmundur Jónsson. The series provides Björk's creative process for the creation of each of her album.

Each episode focuses on a specific album, beginning with the release of her first album, and continues chronologically through her discography. The first three episodes, covering Debut (1993) Post (1995) and Homogenic (1997) were released simultaneously on September 1, 2022, with subsequent episodes following weekly. The podcast lead up to the release of Björk's tenth studio album, Fossora (2022).

The podcast was made in a collaboration between Mailchimp and Talkhouse, and was produced by Christian Koons and edited by Koons and Anna Gyða.

== Background and development ==
The conception of the podcast emerged during the COVID-19 pandemic. Björk collaborated with friends, including philosopher and writer Oddný Eir, with whom she co-wrote "Thunderbolt" on Biophilia (2011) and "Atom Dance" from Vulnicura (2015), and musicologist Ásmundur Jónsson, who helped her compile her Live Box compilation (2003).

The podcast series was structured to provide a chronological exploration of Björk's discography, beginning with her 1993 album Debut and progressing through subsequent releases. Each episode focuses on a specific album. The podcast was first announced on August 25, 2022, and the first three episodes covering Debut, Post and Homogenic were released simultaneously on September 1, 2022, with subsequent episodes following on a weekly basis.

To promote Sonic Symbolism, Björk appeared in the August 31, 2022 episode of the fellow Mailchimp-promoted podcast Listening, where she debuted an original composition made up of two live performances from her Björk Orkestral tour, "Hidden Place" from Vespertine (2001) and "New World" from Selmasongs (2000), accompanied by The Hamrahlid Choir and mixed with field recordings by Chris Watson.

== Reception ==
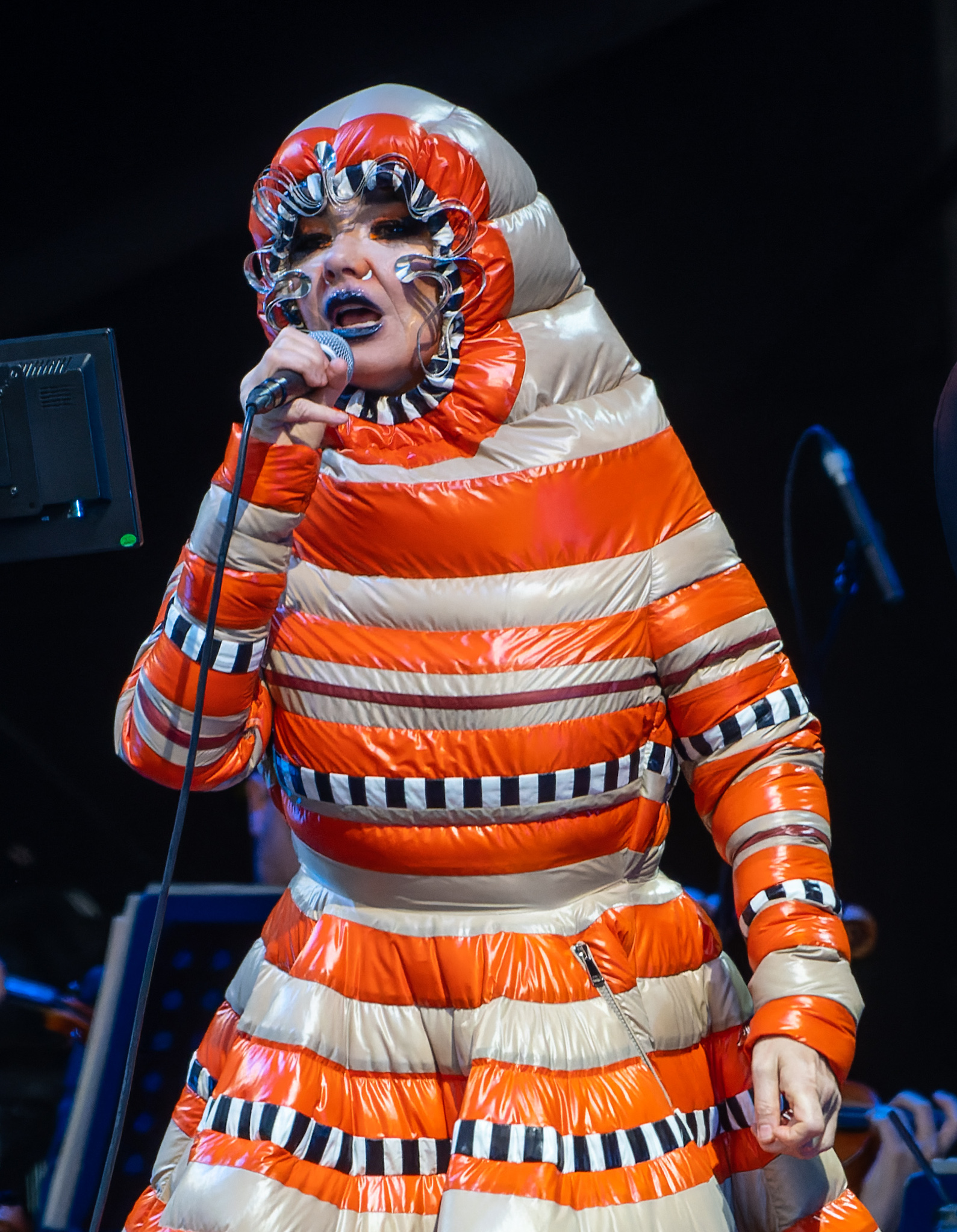
Björk at Bluedot Festival

The podcast was received positively by critics. In a review for Pitchfork, writer Eric Torres describes the podcast as "an intimate, worthy deep dive". Torres notes that the podcast is "equally designed for Björk diehards and recent converts".

The Guardian's review by Rachel Aroesti calls the podcast mesmerizing with "chirping, whirring, soaring and shimmering snippets of Björk’s music snake around the artist’s slow, deliberate and joy-suffused musings". Aroesti also describes the podcast being "frequently surprising enough to stop you in your tracks". The Times included the podcast in its list of "10 best music podcasts".

Hit The North's review praises Björk as she "continues to delight and confound in equal measure".

Jezebel's author Rich Juzwiak calls the podcast "for the most part subdued, clear, and adept at articulating the rationale behind her most alien of sounds". Juzwiak also praises the albums in the podcast as they "were reflections of where she was in life, the podcast doubles as a memoir, but one with limitations".

The Journal of Popular Music Studies published an academic analysis of the podcast, discussing the distinct speaking and singing voice from Björk and how the podcast serves as a metahphor for authorial control.

The New Yorker's review by Rachel Syme, calls the podcast "a rare chance to listen in as one of the most mysterious and mystical artists working today explains herself".

=== Accolades ===
The Björk: Sonic Symbolism podcast series received a Webby Award nomination in the category of Best Partnership or Collaboration. The podcast won a Signal Award for Most Innovative Audio Experience – Limited Series & Specials, and a bronze prize from the Clio Awards in the Streaming/Downloadable Content category.

== Episodes ==
No.	Title	Length	Original release date
1	"Debut"	50:40	September 1, 2022
Shy, beginner, humility, virgin, beige, silver, mohair, the messenger.
2	"Post"	48:15	September 1, 2022
Urban, greedy, promiscuity, euphoric, absorb, orange, pink.
3	"Homogenic"	46:16	September 1, 2022
Warrior, active, volcanic beats, confrontational, icelandic octet, beats, cosmopolitan/icelandic contrast, green, patriotic.
4	"Vespertine"	41:34	September 8, 2022
Winter world, paradise, frozen, celestial, whispered vocals, microbeats, loyal, swans, harps, music boxes, laptops, orchestra, glockenspiels, salvation, choir.
5	"Medúlla"	44:47	September 15, 2022
Primordial, motherhood, black braided hair, breastfeeding, passive, pre-civilisation, goth, folk, archeology, bones, family around campfire.
6	"Volta"	39:13	September 22, 2022
Justice, fire, anthropology, wanderlust, activist, brass, boats, feminist, red, neon green, electric blue, flags, trumpets, tribal beats, bombastic.
7	"Biophilia"	42:51	September 29, 2022
Equilibrium, synchronising opposites, electric blue, copper, pedagogic, cosmic, atom, element table, no human scale, galaxies, nasa, not narrative, pacifist, nature/technology, solutions, kofi annan.
8	"Vulnicura"	54:14	October 6, 2022
Confessional, victimhood, lieder-songs, moss tundra, greek tragedy update, man-woman-conflict, chamber orchestra, lavender wax, the ritual of mourning, sewing wound, recovery narrative, heartbreak, shock, neon, yellow, lava.
9	"Utopia"	50:47	October 13, 2022
Sci-fi island in the clouds, plant-human-bird mutant, post-apocalyptic optimism, air, flutes, synths, pacifist, #metoo, matriarchal, peach, mint, idealistic, women and children surviving violence, manifesto the future, sensuality.
