= Atopy (philosophy) =

Impracticality of being assimilated to a topic

Atopy (Greek ατοπία, atopía; Socrates has often been called "átopos") is a concept describing the ineffability of things or emotions that are rarely experienced, which are outstanding and original in the strict sense. It is a certain quality (of experience) that can be observed within oneself or within others, differing from the ideal quality which is conceptualized, not experienced.

== History ==
=== Roland Barthes ===
French literary theorist Roland Barthes discussed and reevaluated the concept of atopy numerous times in his work. In A Lover's Discourse: Fragments, Barthes defined it as "unclassifiable, of a ceaselessly unforeseen originality", referring to the circumstance, an atopia, in which atopy is intercommunicated in interest and love. Previously, in The Pleasure of the Text, he regarded pleasure itself as atopic, saying that "the pleasure of the text is scandalous: not because it is immoral but because it is atopic."

== In popular culture ==
Icelandic singer Björk credited Barthes' interpretation of atopy as a main inspiration for the lyrics of her 2022 song "Atopos".
