= Björk: Archives =

- Language: English
- Subject: Björk
- Published: 2015 (Thames & Hudson)
- Media type: Print (hardcover, paperback)
- Pages: 192
- ISBN: 978-0-500-29194-8

Björk: Archives is a retrospective book covering Björk's career, published by Thames & Hudson, which was released on March 30, 2015.

== Development and description ==
Björk: Archives covers the artist's seven studio albums—beginning with Debut (1993) and followed by Post (1995), Homogenic (1997), Vespertine (2001), Medúlla (2004), Volta (2007), and Biophilia (2011)—and "the personas surrounding each through poetry, academic analysis, philosophical texts, and stunning visuals". The book was announced in November 2014 and released in conjunction with the Museum of Modern Art's (MoMA) exhibition chronicling Björk's career, which ran from March 7 to June 7, 2015. It marks Björk's first publication in more than ten years, following her 2001 eponymous autobiography.

Archives was overseen by Björk and MoMA curator Klaus Biesenbach, who wrote the book's introduction; together they recruited writing participation from some of Björk's collaborators, including Chris Cunningham, musicology professor Nicola Dibben, Spike Jonze, and Sjón, among others. The book also includes photographs of Björk by Araki, Nan Goldin, Inez van Lamsweerde and Vinoodh Matadin, and Jürgen Teller, along with images of costumes worn by the singer by Hussein Chalayan, Sophia Kokosalaki and Alexander McQueen. Accompanying Archives are five booklets and a poster featuring artwork of all seven studio albums. The book has been officially billed as "a real celebration of creativity... packed Full of Love and Wanderlust, Possibly Maybe guaranteed to make you Violently Happy", incorporating Björk's lyrics and song titles into the description.

== Reception ==
Building on the book's use of lyrics and song titles in its description, i-D magazine wrote, "Put simply, this is definitely one to add to your reading list! Once It's in Our Hands, we're never going to let it go." Archives has been called "meaty" and "luxurious".

== See also ==
- 2015 in literature
