= Björk (book) =

Book published by the singer of the same name

Björk/Björk as a book
- The cover text is titled Wardrobe
- Author: Björk
- Cover artist: Stéphanie Cohen
- Language: English
- Genre: Photography, biography
- Publisher: Bloomsbury USA
- Publication date: September 20, 2001
- Media type: Print (paperback)
- Pages: 192
- ISBN: 1-582-34226-1
- OCLC: 48045180

Björk or Björk as a book is a 192-page coffee table book published by the Icelandic singer and composer Björk Guðmundsdóttir (2001), designed by M/M Paris.

== Background ==
To coincide with the release of Björk's fourth studio album Vespertine (2001), Björk released a photo-book. The eponymous book has been created by Björk and has been edited and designed by celebrated Paris based design firm M/M (Paris) who, along with photographers Inez van Lamsweerde and Vinoodh Matadin, have also created the artwork for Vespertine and directed the video for the first single off the album, "Hidden Place". The photograph on the rear cover of the book is an early test shot for the video. The book is non-chronological and all the images have been specifically chosen to illustrate this creative process.

The book is divided into 3 sections:

1. Photography - a series of photographs of Björk
2. Words – text pieces, including an interview conducted by Björk with David Attenborough.
3. Contributions ("Four Pages for Björk") – Björk asks her collaborators to contribute 4 pages to illustrate her belief that her public self is the result of many great and creative minds and not just a personal product.

The book features a dust jacket made in fabric. It has been designed as a transportable working manual rather than a traditional, hardback, coffee-table book.

== Credits ==
Credits taken from M/M (Paris) website.

=== Contributions by ===
- Nobuyoshi Araki
- Martin Argles
- Jane Bown
- Comme des Garçons
- Anton Corbijn
- Hussein Chalayan
- Chris Cunningham
- Gabríela Friðriksdóttir
- Kate Garner
- Andrea Giacobbe
- Michel Gondry
- Haraldur Jonsson
- Irmelie Krekin
- Nick Knight
- Inez van Lamsweerde
- Vinoodh Matadin
- Glen Luchford
- M/M (Paris)
- Stefan Malzkorn
- Graham Massey
- Craig McDean
- Toby McFarlan Pond
- Me Company
- Jean-Baptiste Mondino
- Bjørn Opsahl
- Rankin
- Mark Ryden
- Jeremy Scott
- Stéphane Sednaoui
- David Sims
- Sjón
- Snorri Bros
- Stephen Sweet
- Juergen Teller
- Benni Valsson
- Lars von Trier
- Kevin Westenberg

=== Words by ===
- Björk & Sir David Attenborough
- introduced by Jefferson Hack
- Stéphanie Cohen
- Philippe Parreno
- Rick Poynorand
- Won Tchoi
