= Ovule (song) =

Single by Björk

from the album Fossora
- Released: 14 September 2022
- Genre: Orchestral; glitch pop
- Length: 3:37
- Label: One Little Independent
- Songwriter: Björk
- Producers: Björk; El Guincho^{[a]}; Sideproject^{[a]}

Björk singles chronology
"Atopos" (2022)	"Ovule" (2022)	"Ancestress" (2022)

Music video
- "Ovule" on YouTube

"Ovule" is a song by Icelandic musician Björk, released on 14 September 2022 as the second single from her tenth studio album Fossora. The song was written and produced by Björk, who also arranged the trombones and timpani. Musically, "Ovule" is an orchestral and glitch pop ballad with elements of jazz and reggaeton.

== Background and release ==
Björk announced the song's release date on her social media on 14 September 2022, describing it as "a meditation about us as lovers walking around this world." Its instrumentation features trombone played by Bergur Þórisson and timpani by Soraya Nayyar, with both parts arranged by Björk). "Ovule" is a "rhythmically fluid" orchestral and glitch pop ballad, that contains elements of jazz and reggaeton. The track also features percussion from Reykjavík trio Sideproject who were instructed to "channel the lurid sounds of Star Wars' Mos Eisley cantina band." A remix of "Ovule" by Irish music producer Sega Bodega featuring English rapper and singer Shygirl was released on 20 January 2023. Described by Björk as "chill-bassdrum-gabba", it explores a sprawling deep house sound.

== Music video ==
The music video was also released on 14 September 2022. It was directed by Nick Knight, whom Björk worked with for the music video of her song "Pagan Poetry" video in 2001 and the Homogenic album cover in 1997.

== Track listings ==
Digital download

1. Ovule – 3:38

Digital download - Sega Bodega Remix

1. Ovule (Sega Bodega Remix) [featuring Shygirl] – 3:44

== Personnel ==
Credits adapted from Fossora's official website.

- Björk – vocals, production, beat, arrangements
- Soraya Nayyar – timpani
- Bergur Þorrison – trombone
- Sideproject – percussion

== Charts ==
Chart performance for "Ovule"
Chart (2023)	Peak position
UK Singles Sales (OCC)	39

== Notes ==
- ^{^[a]} Credited as an additional producer.
