= Atopos (song) =

Single by Björk featuring Kasimyn

from the album Fossora
- Released: 6 September 2022
- Genre: Experimental techno; dembow
- Length: 4:46 (album version); 3:48 (video version)
- Label: One Little Independent
- Songwriters: Björk; Kasimyn
- Producer: Björk

Björk singles chronology
"Arisen My Senses" (2018)	"Atopos" (2022)	"Ovule" (2022)

Music video
- "Atopos" on YouTube

"Atopos" is a song by Icelandic musician Björk featuring Kasimyn of Indonesian duo Gabber Modus Operandi, released on 6 September 2022 as the lead single from Björk's tenth studio album Fossora. The song was co-written by Björk and Kasimyn, and premiered on BBC Radio 6 Music.

== Background ==
Björk announced the song's release date on her social media on 5 September 2022, calling it "like Fossora's passport" and describing it as "Sonically a heavy bottom-ended bass world. We have 6 bass clarinets, punchy sub drilling, nesting and digging us into the ground."

The song's title comes from the Greek word for "strange, or out of place" and with lyrics about "hope" and "collective optimism", takes inspiration from French theorist Roland Barthes' interpretation of the concept of atopy.

== Critical reception ==
Shaad D'Souza of The Guardian described the song as "an apocalyptic almost-dance track which pairs experimental techno with pulsing clarinets". Eric Torres of Pitchfork called it a "strange, ecstatic balance of honking bass clarinets, cooing background vocals, and forceful beats" from Kasimyn with the "kinetic looseness of 2007's Volta" and a "vertigo-inducing percussive breakdown".

== Music video ==
The music video was also released on 6 September 2022, and was directed by Viðar Logi. Madison Bloom and Jazz Monroe of Pitchfork described the video as a "party at a mushoom rave" in a "fungal underworld, where a masked Björk, a bass clarinet sextet, and Gabber Modus Operandi's DJ Kasimyn gear up for a rave showdown".

== Track listings ==
Digital download

1. Atopos – 4:46

Digital download - Sideproject Remix

1. Atopos (Sideproject Remix) – 3:39
