= Ancestress (song) =

Single by Björk

from the album Fossora
- Released: 22 September 2022
- Length: 7:17
- Label: One Little Independent
- Songwriter: Björk
- Producer: Björk

Björk singles chronology
"Ovule" (2022)	"Ancestress" (2022)	"Fossora" (2022)

Music video
- "Ancestress" on YouTube

"Ancestress" is a song by Icelandic musician Björk, featuring backing vocals from her son Sindri Eldon. The song was released on 22 September 2022 as the third single from her tenth studio album Fossora. A music video directed by Andrew Thomas Huang was also released alongside the single.

== Background ==
"Ancestress" was written as a tribute to Björk's mother, who died in 2018. In an interview with Pitchfork, she stated: "If I was a priest, it's what I would've said at the funeral." The song was "written in an epitaph in an Icelandic folk style" and features heavy use of strings and features vocals by Björk's son, Sindri Eldon. Eldon participated in the arrangement of the vocals alongside his mother. Like other tracks on Fossora, Soraya Nayyar contributes percussion to the song.

== Reception ==
"Ancestress" was named the 18th best song of 2022 by Pitchfork. The music video was also nominated at the 2023 Icelandic Music Awards in the Music Video of the year category.

== Personnel ==
Credits adapted from Björk's official website:

- Björk – vocals, string arrangement, percussion arrangement, vocal arrangement, beat, programming, production
- Sindri Eldon – vocals, vocal arrangement
- Soraya Nayyar – percussion
- Una Sveinbjarnardóttir – strings
- Helga Þóra Björgvinsdóttir – strings
- Laura Liu – strings
- Ingrid Karlsdóttir – strings
- Geirþrúður Ása Guðjónsdóttir – strings
- Þórunn Ösk Marinósdóttir – strings
- Lucia Koczot – strings
- Sigurður Bjarki Gunnarsson – strings
- Júlía Mogensen – strings
- Xun Yang – strings
- Ragnheiður Ingunn Jóhannsdóttir – conducting
- Jake Miller – programming
