= Um Úrnat frá Björk =

Icelandic fairy tale and poetry book by Bjork

Um Úrnat frá Björk (in English, About Úrnat from Björk) is an Icelandic fairy tale and poetry book by Björk.

It was released by Smekkleysa, a publishing company created by Björk's friends, in 1984, but there are some doubts about its accurate year of publication.

The book has only 16 pages hand-written and illustrated by Björk using crayons and water-colours. There are only 100 copies, so they are special collectors' editions. Their price varies between US$10,000 and US$15,000.
