= Pterourus bjorkae =

New England tiger swallowtail

Scientific classification
- Kingdom: Animalia
- Phylum: Arthropoda
- Clade: Pancrustacea
- Class: Insecta
- Order: Lepidoptera
- Family: Papilionidae
- Genus: Pterourus
- Species: P. bjorkae

Binomial name
- Pterourus bjorkae Pavulaan, 2024

Synonyms
- Papilio bjorkae (Pavulaan, 2024), per DeRoller et al. 2025.

Species of butterfly

Pterourus bjorkae (or Papilio bjorkae in some schemes), known as the New England tiger swallowtail, is a species of butterfly belonging to the swallowtail family (Papilionidae), discovered and described in 2024 by entomologist Harry Pavulaan. The species name, bjorkae, honors Icelandic singer, songwriter, and environmentalist Björk, to recognize her artistic influence and her contributions to environmental awareness.

== Discovery ==
The identification of Pterourus bjorkae emerged from studies of the Pterourus glaucus complex in southern New England, United States. Researchers observed distinct phenotypic differences in early spring populations, leading to the classification of this univoltine (single-brooded) taxon as a separate species. However, another report considers these differences to be inconclusive, noteing that P. bjorkae may actually be conspecific with either P. glaucus or P. canadensis.

The holotype (female) and allotype (male) specimens of Pterourus bjorkae are deposited at the McGuire Center for Lepidoptera and Biodiversity in Gainesville, Florida.

== Appearance ==
Pterourus bjorkae is notable for its large size, with an average wingspan of approximately 8.5 centimeters, making it the largest subspecies within its complex. The butterfly exhibits a striking yellow coloration adorned with dark patterns and orange spots. Its caterpillar stage resembles a small snake, a form of mimicry that may deter some predators. Adults are commonly found at flower gardens.

== Habitat ==
Pterourus bjorkae primarily inhabits deciduous forests in the eastern regions of North America. Its presence in these ecosystems contributes to the biodiversity and ecological complexity of the area.

== See also ==
- List of organisms named after famous people (born 1950–1974)
