= Ingibjörg Þorbergs =

Icelandic composer (1927–2019)

Ingibjörg Þorbergs (full name Ingibjörg Kristín Þorbergsdóttir, also spelled Thorbergs; 25 October 1927 – 6 May 2019) was an Icelandic composer, singer, and program director. She was among the first women songwriters in Iceland, writing songs that have remained popular and been recorded many times by various artists.

== Career ==
Ingibjörg Þorbergs was born in Reykjavík. As a child, she sang in children's choirs and first sang publicly on national radio aged 12. She began clarinet studies at the Reykjavík College of Music, graduating in 1952 with a soloist diploma. She was the first female wind player to graduate with a diploma in Iceland. She also studied music theory, music history, and piano, and in 1957 she completed a teacher's diploma at the Reykjavík Teacher's College.

Ingibjörg began to sing publicly with local orchestras around 1950, and made her first commercial recording in 1953. She was the first Icelandic woman to record her own music, and to conduct the accompanying orchestra in her own arrangements. Her first hit composition, Hin fyrstu jól (The First Christmas) was released in 1954. This is considered the first Icelandic Christmas song, apart from church hymns. She wrote the music for the National Theater's play Ferðin til Limbó (Journey to Limbo, 1966) and also wrote popular children's songs to Christmas texts, such as Jólakötturinn (The Christmas Cat). In 1987, an album of her Christmas songs ("Hvít er borg og bær") was released. On it, Björk performs her song Jólakötturinn. Another widely popular song in Iceland is Aravísur, to a poem by Stefán Jónsson about a curious boy named Ari.

Ingibjörg Þorbergs began working at the Icelandic National Radio in 1946, and worked there until 1985. In 1949, she became a producer in the music department, and was for a long while the presenter of the radio children's program. From 1981–85, she was Assistant Program Director, and later Program Director, of the National Radio, which at that time only broadcast on one channel. She was also a music critic for the Icelandic newspapers Tíminn and Vísir.

== Awards ==
Ingibjörg Þorbergs received the Honorary Lifetime Award at the Icelandic Music Awards in 2003. In 2008, she was made Commander of the Order of the Falcon for her contribution to Icelandic music. In 2012, she was given an Honorary Lifetime Award by her hometown of Kópavogur.

== Selected recordings ==
- Hin fyrstu jól. Ingibjörg Þorbergs and orchestra, 1954.
- Ingibjörg Þorbergs syngur Aravísur. Íslenzkir tónar, 1954.
- Hvít er borg og bær. Björk Guðmundsdóttir, Egill Ólafsson, Iceland Symphony Orchestra, et al. Hljóðaklettur, 1987.
- Hin fyrstu jól. On Ljósin heima. Páll Óskar Hjálmtýsson and Monika Abendroth. Skífan, 2003.
- Útvarpsperlur: Ingibjörg Þorbergs (radio performances by Ingibjörg Þorbergs). RÚV, 2005.
