= Toby McFarlan Pond =

English still life photographer

Toby McFarlan Pond is an English still life photographer who works in fashion, music, and advertising.

Pond was raised in the South Coast of England and currently lives in Connecticut, United States.

He mainly photographs luxury goods, such as jewelry, handbags, and heels, in addition to photography of people and landscapes, often in bright, vivid color.

He has photographed for The New York Times, W Magazine, Vogue Hommes International, The Face, Pop Magazine, and Big Magazine.

Pond has also done cover art for the Icelandic musician Björk.
