= Fossora =

2022 studio album by Björk

Studio album by Björk
- Released: 30 September 2022
- Recorded: 2021–2022
- Studios: Háteigskirkja, Stúdíó Sýrland (Reykjavík); Víðistaðakirkja (Hafnarfjörður)
- Genres: Avant-pop; techno; industrial noise
- Length: 54:14
- Languages: English; Icelandic
- Label: One Little Independent
- Producer: Björk

Björk chronology
| Country Creatures (2019) | Fossora (2022) | Cornucopia Live (2025) |

Singles from Fossora
- 1. "Atopos" Released: 6 September 2022; 2. "Ovule" Released: 14 September 2022; 3. "Ancestress" Released: 22 September 2022; 4. "Fossora" Released: 27 September 2022

Fossora is the tenth (Note: Fossora is officially considered to be Björk's tenth album and contrary to previous works, the album is completely produced by her. However, this is the eleventh solo album if her self-titled 1977 album is included, or her twelfth album if her 1990 jazz album Gling-Gló with tríó Guðmundar Ingólfssonar is also included.) studio album by Icelandic singer-musician Björk. It was released on 30 September 2022 through One Little Independent Records. The album was recorded mainly during the COVID-19 pandemic and centers around the theme of isolation, loss, and grief, mainly of the death of her mother, Hildur Rúna Hauksdóttir, in 2018. Björk chose an 'earthy' sound palette built around bass clarinet and industrial techno beats. The album entered the UK Albums Chart at number 11 and the US Billboard 200 at number 100. It received a nomination for Best Alternative Music Album at the 65th Annual Grammy Awards, becoming Björk's ninth consecutive nomination in the category.

== Background ==
Fossora was partially inspired by the 2018 death of Björk's mother, Hildur Rúna Hauksdóttir; the songs "Sorrowful Soil" and "Ancestress" are about her, as well as how Björk dealt with her grief. In the album's liner notes, the former is subtitled "a eulogy for Hildur Rúna", and the latter is subtitled "an epitaph for Hildur Rúna". The album was conceptualized during the COVID-19 lockdowns after Björk travelled to Iceland to record. Keeping with the album's themes, its title is the ungrammatical feminine version of the Latin word for "digger". The album features contributions from American singer Serpentwithfeet, Björk's two children Sindri and Ísadóra, Indonesian dance duo Gabber Modus Operandi, and clarinet sextet Murmuri. The album was also set to feature contributions from the Venezuelan producer Arca like Björk's previous two albums Vulnicura (2015) and Utopia (2017), but due to the pandemic, Björk was unable to visit her in Barcelona or to welcome her at home.

"Allow" is an outtake from the sessions for Utopia, that was rearranged for Fossora. Per an interview with Pitchfork's Jazz Monroe, Björk says the album began as "very conceptual, like: 'This is the clarinet album!' Then halfway through, I was like, 'Fuck that.'" She described it as an "'Iceland album': often uninhibited and volatile, but also steeped in the country's choral and folk traditions, with strings Björk programmed at her local coffee shop." Her interest in mushrooms "unified the record's themes of survival, death, and ecological meditation." She frames the album in contrast to her previous Utopia, with that album being "a skybound haven after her traumatic divorce" from longtime partner Matthew Barney and Fossora being her return to Earth. She describes the fungus metaphor as "something that lives underground, but not tree roots. A tree root album would be quite severe and stoic, but mushrooms are psychedelic and they pop up everywhere."

== Promotional campaign and release ==
The lead single, "Atopos", along with its cover art, was announced on 24 August. The release date was later confirmed for 6 September, with the song premiering on BBC Radio 6 Music. The second single, "Ovule", was released without any prior announcement on 14 September, along with a music video directed by Nick Knight, who had also worked on Björk's own "Pagan Poetry" music video in 2001. The third single, "Ancestress", featuring Björk's son, Sindri Eldon, was released on 22 September. The title track was released as the fourth single on 27 September 2022. The music video for "Sorrowful Soil" premiered on 2 December. On 30 March 2023, the music video to the title track was released. Premiering at one of Björk's Cornucopia shows in Lisbon, Portugal, the "Victimhood" music video was not officially released until 5 September 2023, alongside an interview with the music video's director, Gabríela Fridriksdóttir.

Fossora was released as a digisleeve CD, deluxe hardbound book CD, limited clear and silver 'spore' glitter cassette, and double LP; a turquoise variant of the LP exclusive to her official website and record label; a green variant of the LP being exclusive to indie record stores; standard black and 4 other color variants (burgundy, lime, silver, and clear) were also available from other specific retailers. A second cassette edition released with a turquoise tape shell was released in November 2022, in addition to full 2023 represses of several colour vinyl editions with the updated master audio that was finished after the first 2022 pressings had gone in to production. On 7 November 2023, on Björk's website, a Fossora boxset was announced as a pre-order (to ship later, in November 2023). This boxset includes two 10-inch records on crystal clear vinyl, with five "re-imagined" tracks from the Fossora album, a 100% silk oversized scarf, two fine art pigment prints, an "Atopos" score book, an illustrated booklet, a music notebook, a Fossora alphabet poster, and a certificate of authenticity. This boxset was priced at £200.00; roughly US$245.

=== The Fossora Remixes ===
On 9 December 2022, Icelandic electronic trio Sideproject unveiled their remix of "Atopos". On 20 January 2023, Irish-Scottish producer Sega Bodega released a remix of "Ovule". The remix features vocals from English rapper and DJ Shygirl, and Sega "exploring chill-bassdrum-gabba". On 22 April 2023, the Record Store Day, Björk released a double A-side 12" of both remixes. The reversible two image sleeve featured Nick Knight and Viðar Logi imagery with black metallic hotfoil lettering designed by M/M Paris and crystal-clear vinyl.

== Critical reception ==
Professional ratings
Aggregate scores
| Source | Rating |
|---|---|
| AnyDecentMusic? | 7.9/10 |
| Metacritic | 85/100 |
Review scores
| Source | Rating |
| AllMusic | 4.5/5 stars |
| Clash | 8/10 |
| Evening Standard | 4/5 stars |
| The Guardian | 4/5 stars |
| The Independent | 4/5 stars |
| The Line of Best Fit | 9/10 |
| Mojo | 4/5 stars |
| NME | 4/5 stars |
| Pitchfork | 8.4/10 |
| Rolling Stone | 4/5 stars |

Fossora was met with acclaim from critics upon its release. At Metacritic, which assigns a normalised rating out of 100 to reviews from mainstream publications, the album received an average score of 85, based on 22 reviews. Aggregator AnyDecentMusic? gave it 7.9 out of 10, based on their assessment of the critical consensus.

Concluding the review for AllMusic, Heather Phares declared that "On this soul-nourishing tour de force, her one-of-a-kind mix of innovation and emotion is as inspiring as it's ever been over her decades-long career." At Clash, David Weaver claimed that, "there is no doubt that with Fossora, Björk is restating her individuality, thematically examining her place in the world as a 56-year old musician, whilst assuredly pushing sonic boundaries from neo-classical to industrial noise." Paul Bridgewater shared similar sentiments in the review for The Line of Best Fit; "Fossora does indeed bang harder than any of her albums have for a long time and yet it's not an abrasive record at heart."

In a review of the album for NME, Emily MacKay declared it "An album of reinfatuation and reaffirmation, Fossora is invigorating in its drive, if there's little of real surprise here; hard as the mushroom-gabber beats are, if you've heard 'Pluto' or 'Mutual Core', you won't be shocked." Pitchfork reviewer Jill Mapes described Björk's performance as being "grounded back on earth, searching for hope in death, mushrooms, and matriarchy, and finding it in bass clarinet and gabber beats." Will Hermes at Rolling Stone stated that "Fossora zooms in Google Map-style, looking at people on the ground and in the room, measuring distances between them. The sonic landscape is still huge—awesome, as alien as it is familiar, full of otherworldly arrangements, tectonic beats, and craggy melodies that conjure the terrain of her native Iceland. The artist described it as something of her 'mushroom' album, using metaphors about burrowing in the dirt. In short, it's Björk at her absolute Björkiest."

Amongst the few reviewers that were more critical of the album, Slant Magazine writer Sam C. Mac wrote that, "The Icelandic iconoclast's compositional sense is as unbound as ever, her songs amoeba-like organisms transfiguring from one second to the next across the album, in line with a logic that's defiantly hers alone, both for better and worse." Austin Saalman compared the album less favorably to Björk's oeuvre, in the review for Under the Radar; "Fossora is less engaging than Utopia, Vulnicura, and Biophilia, and except for 'Ovule', 'Ancestress', and 'Allow', cannot compete with her 1990s and early 2000s output." At Paste, Max Feedman called it "a dense, challenging experiment that gradually coheres into an immersive and sometimes unsettling experience," but also noted that it wasn't without its "occasional missteps along the way."

The album's third single, "Ancestress", was named the 18th best song of 2022 by Pitchfork.

=== Accolades ===
==== Awards and nominations ====
Awards and nominations for Fossora
| Organization | Award | Status | Ref. |
|---|---|---|---|
| Grammy Awards | Best Alternative Music Album | Nominated | |
| Icelandic Music Awards | Alternative Album of the Year | Won | |
| Icelandic Music Awards | Recording Direction of the Year | Won | |
| Icelandic Music Awards | Album Cover of the Year | Nominated | |
| Libera Awards | Best Pop Record | Nominated | |

==== Year-end lists ====
Fossora on year-end lists
| Publication | # | Ref. |
|---|---|---|
| Albumism | 10 | |
| AllMusic | —N/a | |
| Exclaim! | 28 | |
| The Line of Best Fit | 5 | |
| Louder Than War | 18 | |
| Mojo | 59 | |
| Mondo Sonoro | 25 | |
| The New York Times (Jon Pareles) | 8 | |
| Paste | 50 | |
| Pitchfork | 12 | |
| Uncut | 46 | |

== Track listing ==
All tracks produced by Björk, except for "Ovule" additionally produced by el Guincho and Sideproject.

Fossora track listing
| No. | Title | Lyrics | Music | Length |
|---|---|---|---|---|
| 1. | "Atopos" (featuring Kasimyn) | Björk | Björk; Kasimyn | 4:46 |
| 2. | "Ovule" | Björk | Björk | 3:38 |
| 3. | "Mycelia" | Björk | Björk | 2:00 |
| 4. | "Sorrowful Soil" | Björk | Björk | 3:15 |
| 5. | "Ancestress" (featuring Sindri Eldon) | Björk | Björk | 7:17 |
| 6. | "Fagurt Er í Fjörðum" | Látra-Björg | Traditional | 0:44 |
| 7. | "Victimhood" | Björk | Björk | 6:57 |
| 8. | "Allow" (featuring Emilie Nicolas) | Björk; Nicolas | Björk | 5:26 |
| 9. | "Fungal City" (featuring Serpentwithfeet) | Björk | Björk; Kasimyn | 4:45 |
| 10. | "Trölla-Gabba" (featuring Kasimyn) | Björk | Björk; Kasimyn | 1:57 |
| 11. | "Freefall" | Björk | Björk | 4:31 |
| 12. | "Fossora" (featuring Kasimyn) | Björk | Björk; Kasimyn | 4:19 |
| 13. | "Her Mother's House" (featuring Ísadóra Bjarkardóttir Barney) | Björk; Bjarkardóttir Barney | Björk | 4:33 |
| Total length: | | | | 54:14 |

Fossoræ – Limited Edition Deluxe Boxset (bonus 10" records)
| No. | Title | Length |
|---|---|---|
| 1. | "Ancestress" (Strings Version) | 6:54 |
| 2. | "Ancestress" (Bell Version) | 6:45 |
| 3. | "Sorrowful Soil" (Choral Version) | 3:13 |
| 4. | "Fungal City" (Strings Version) | 4:40 |
| 5. | "Allow" (Alt Mix; featuring Emilie Nicolas) | 6:10 |
| Total length: | | 27:43 |

The Fossora Remixes – double A-side 12"
| No. | Title | Remixer(s) | Length |
|---|---|---|---|
| 1. | "Ovule" (featuring Shygirl) | Sega Bodega | 3:44 |
| 2. | "Atopos" | Sideproject | 3:39 |
| Total length: | | | 7:23 |

Notes

- Original pressings of the album credit Gabber Modus Operandi as a whole rather than Kasimyn. Streaming versions, alongside the 2023 repress of the album instead solely credit Kasimyn.

== Personnel ==
"Atopos"

- Björk – vocals, clarinet arrangement, beat, beat editing, production
- Gabber Modus Operandi – beat
- Baldvin Ingvar Tryggvason – clarinet
- Grimur Helgason – clarinet
- Helga Björg Arnardóttir – clarinet
- Hilma Kristín Sveinsdóttir – clarinet
- Kristín Þóra Pétursdóttir – clarinet
- Rúnar Óskarsson – clarinet
- Matthías Birgír Nardeau – oboe

"Ovule"

- Björk – vocals, trombone and timpani arrangements, beat, production
- El Guincho – additional beat production
- Sideproject – additional beat production
- Soraya Nayyar – percussion
- Bergur Þórisson – trombone

"Mycelia"

- Björk – vocals, programming, editing, production

"Sorrowful Soil"

- Björk – vocals, choir arrangement, bassline, production
- Hamrahlíðarkórinn – vocals
- Þorgerður Ingólsfdóttir – conducting

"Ancestress"

- Björk – vocals, vocal arrangement, string and percussion arrangements, beat, programming, production
- Sindri Eldon – vocals, vocal arrangement
- Una Sveinbjarnardóttir – violin
- Helga Þóra Björgvinsdóttir – violin
- Laura Liu – violin
- Ingrid Karlsdóttir – violin
- Geirþrúður Ása Guðjónsdóttir – violin
- Þórunn Ósk Marinósdóttir – viola
- Lucja Koczot – viola
- Sigurður Bjarki Gunnarsson – cello
- Júlia Mogenson – cello
- Xun Yang – contrabass
- Soraya Nayyar – percussion
- Ragenheiður Ingunn Jóhannsdóttir – conducting

"Fagurt Er í Fjörðum"

- Björk – vocals, production
- Ferdinand Rauter – bassline MIDI

"Victimhood"

- Björk – vocals, clarinet arrangement, beat, production
- Baldvin Ingvar Tryggvason – clarinet
- Grimur Helgason – clarinet
- Helga Björg Arnardóttir – clarinet
- Hilma Kristín Sveinsdóttir – clarinet
- Kristín Þóra Pétursdóttir – clarinet
- Rúnar Óskarsson – clarinet
- Matthías Birgír Nardeau – oboe

"Allow"

- Björk – vocals, flute arrangement, beat, production
- Emilie Nicolas – vocals
- Eivind Helgerød – additional vocal production
- Áshildur Haraldsdóttir – flute
- Berglind María Tómasdóttir – flute
- Björg Brjánsdóttir – flute
- Dagný Marinósdóttir – flute
- Emilía Rós Sigfúsdóttir – flute
- Hafdis Vigfúsdóttir – flute
- Melkorka Ólafsdóttir – flute
- Pamela De Sensi – flute
- Sigríður Hjördís Indriðadóttir – flute
- Sólveig Magnúsdóttir – flute
- Steinunn Vala Pálsdóttir – flute
- Þuríður Jónsdóttir – flute

"Fungal City"

- Björk – vocals, vocal arrangement, clarinet and string arrangements, beat, beat editing, production
- Serpentwithfeet – vocal arrangement
- Gabber Modus Operandi – beat
- Baldvin Ingvar Tryggvason – clarinet
- Grimur Helgason – clarinet
- Helga Björg Arnardóttir – clarinet
- Hilma Kristín Sveinsdóttir – clarinet
- Kristín Þóra Pétursdóttir – clarinet
- Rúnar Óskarsson – clarinet
- Una Sveinbjarnardóttir – violin
- Helga Þóra Björgvinsdóttir – violin
- Laura Liu – violin
- Ingrid Karlsdóttir – violin
- Geirþrúður Ása Guðjónsdóttir – violin
- Þórunn Ósk Marinósdóttir – viola
- Lucja Koczot – viola
- Sigurður Bjarki Gunnarsson – cello
- Júlia Mogenson – cello
- Xun Yang – contrabass
- Ragenheiður Ingunn Jóhannsdóttir – conducting
- Matthías Birgír Nardeau – oboe

"Trölla-Gabba"

- Björk – vocals, programming, editing, production
- Gabber Modus Operandi – beat, backing vocals (physical versions)

"Freefall"

- Björk – vocals, string arrangement, production
- Una Sveínbjarnardóttir – violin
- Helga Þóra Björgvinsdóttir – violin
- Þórunn Ósk Marinósdóttir – viola
- Sigurður Bjarki Gunnarsson – cello
- Xun Yang – contrabass

"Fossora"

- Björk – vocals, clarinet and oboe arrangements, editing, production
- Gabber Modus Operandi – beat, backing vocals (physical versions)
- Baldvin Ingvar Tryggvason – clarinet
- Grimur Helgason – clarinet
- Helga Björg Arnardóttir – clarinet
- Hilma Kristín Sveinsdóttir – clarinet
- Kristín Þóra Pétursdóttir – clarinet
- Rúnar Óskarsson – clarinet
- Matthías Birgír Nardeau – oboe

"Her Mother's House"

- Björk – vocals, cor anglais arrangement, keyboard programming, production
- Ìsadóra Bjarkardóttir Barney – vocals
- Matthías Birgír Nardeau – cor anglais

== Charts ==
Chart performance for Fossora
| Chart (2022) | Peak position |
|---|---|
| Australian Albums (ARIA) | 55 |
| Austrian Albums (Ö3 Austria) | 28 |
| Belgian Albums (Ultratop Flanders) | 7 |
| Belgian Albums (Ultratop Wallonia) | 25 |
| Dutch Albums (Album Top 100) | 19 |
| Finnish Albums (Suomen virallinen lista) | 30 |
| French Albums (SNEP) | 32 |
| German Albums (Offizielle Top 100) | 10 |
| Hungarian Albums (MAHASZ) | 30 |
| Icelandic Albums (Tónlistinn) | 4 |
| Irish Albums (IRMA) | 44 |
| Irish Independent Albums (IRMA) | 5 |
| Italian Albums (FIMI) | 52 |
| Japanese Albums (Oricon) | 54 |
| Japanese Digital Albums (Oricon) | 31 |
| Japanese Hot Albums (Billboard Japan) | 47 |
| Scottish Albums (Official Charts) | 5 |
| Spanish Albums (Promusicae) | 33 |
| Swedish Albums (Sverigetopplistan) | 37 |
| Swiss Albums (Schweizer Hitparade) | 5 |
| UK Albums (Official Charts) | 11 |
| UK Independent Albums (Official Charts) | 3 |
| US Billboard 200 | 100 |
| US Independent Albums (Billboard) | 15 |
| US Top Alternative Albums (Billboard) | 9 |
| US Top Dance Albums (Billboard) | 2 |
| US Top Rock & Alternative Albums (Billboard) | 20 |
