= Björk =

Icelandic singer (born 1965)

Björk OTF
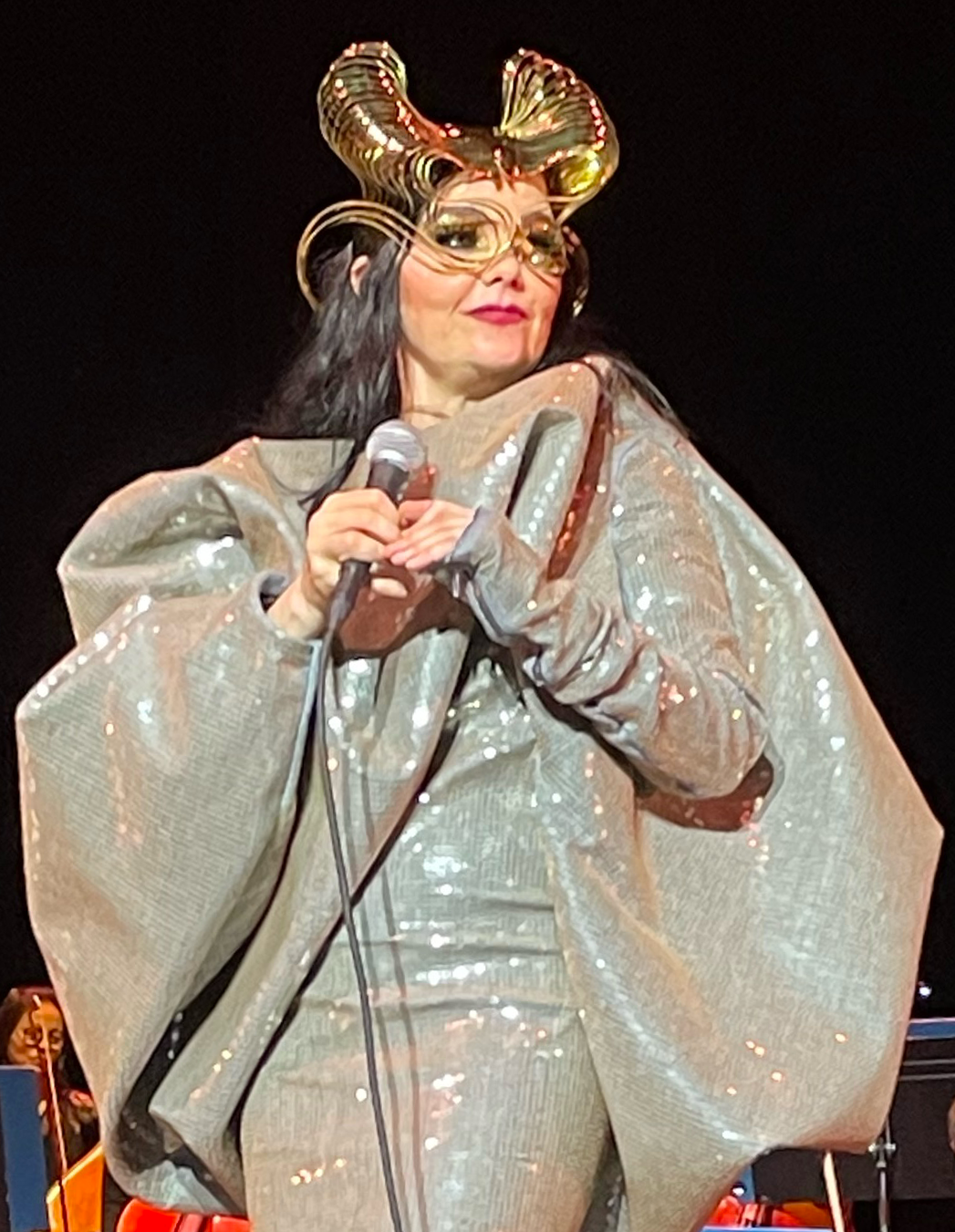
- Björk performing in Paris during her Björk Orkestral show in 2022
- Born: Björk Guðmundsdóttir; 21 November 1965 (age 61); Reykjavík, Iceland
- Occupations: Singer; songwriter; composer; record producer; actress
- Years active: 1977–present
- Notable work: Discography; songs recorded; videography; live performances
- Spouse: Þór Eldon (m. 1986; div. 1987)
- Partner: Matthew Barney (2000–2013)
- Children: 2
- Parents: Guðmundur Gunnarsson (father); Hildur Rúna Hauksdóttir (mother)
- Awards: Full list
- Musical career
- Genres: Art rock; avant-garde; electronic rock; experimental; alternative rock (early)
- Instruments: Vocals; flute; keyboards
- Labels: Fálkinn; One Little Independent; Polydor; Universal; Elektra; Atlantic; Nonesuch; Megaforce; RED
- Formerly of: The Sugarcubes; Kukl; Tappi Tíkarrass; Björk Guðmundsdóttir & tríó Guðmundar Ingólfssonar
- Website: bjork.com

Björk Guðmundsdóttir OTF (/bjɜːrk/, BYURK, Icelandic: [pjœr̥k ˈkvʏðmʏntsˌtouhtɪr̥]; born 21 November 1965) is an Icelandic singer, songwriter, composer, record producer and actress. Noted for her distinct voice, three-octave vocal range, and eccentric public persona, she has developed an eclectic musical style over a career spanning five decades, drawing on electronica, pop, dance, trip hop, jazz, and avant-garde music. She is regarded as one of the most influential musicians of her era.

Born and raised in Reykjavík, Björk began her music career at the age of 11 and gained international recognition as the lead singer of the alternative rock band the Sugarcubes by the age of 21. After the Sugarcubes disbanded in 1992, Björk gained prominence as a solo artist with her albums Debut (1993), Post (1995), and Homogenic (1997), which blended electronic, pop, and avant-garde music and achieved significant critical success. Her later albums saw further experimentation, including the glitch-influenced Vespertine (2001), a cappella album Medúlla (2004), pop-focused Volta (2007), and Biophilia (2011), an interactive album with an accompanying iPad app. Following the death of her longtime co-producer Mark Bell, she collaborated with Venezuelan artist Arca on her albums Vulnicura (2015) and Utopia (2017), while Fossora (2022) marked her first venture as a sole producer.

With sales of over 40 million records worldwide, Björk is one of the best-selling alternative artists of all time. Several of her albums have reached the top 20 on the US Billboard 200 chart. Thirty-one of her singles have reached the top 40 on pop charts around the world, with 22 top 40 hits in the UK, including the top-10 singles "It's Oh So Quiet", "Army of Me", and "Hyperballad" and the top-20 singles "Play Dead", "Big Time Sensuality", and "Violently Happy". Her accolades and awards include the Order of the Falcon, five BRIT Awards, and 18 Grammy nominations (including nine in the Best Alternative Music Album category, the most of any artist). In 2015, Time named her one of the 100 most influential people in the world. Rolling Stone named her the 64th-greatest singer and the 81st-greatest songwriter of all time in 2023.

Björk starred in the 2000 Lars von Trier film Dancer in the Dark, for which she won the Best Actress Award at the 2000 Cannes Film Festival, and was nominated for the Academy Award for Best Original Song for "I've Seen It All". Björk has also been an advocate for environmental causes in Iceland. A retrospective exhibition dedicated to Björk was held at New York's Museum of Modern Art in 2015.

== Life and career ==
=== 1965–1984: Early life and career beginnings ===
Björk Guðmundsdóttir was born on 21 November 1965 in Reykjavík. She was raised by her mother, Hildur Rúna Hauksdóttir (7 October 1946 – 25 October 2018), an activist who protested against the development of Iceland's Kárahnjúkar Hydropower Plant, having divorced from Björk's father, Guðmundur Gunnarsson, an electrician and union leader, after Björk was born. She and her mother moved into a commune. Her stepfather is Sævar Árnason, a former guitarist in the band Pops.

At six, Björk enrolled at Reykjavík school Barnamúsíkskóli, where she studied classical piano and flute. She also went to school with the father of fellow Icelandic singer Laufey. After a school recital in which Björk sang Tina Charles's 1976 hit "I Love to Love", her teachers sent a recording of her singing the song to the RÚV radio station, which at that time was Iceland's only radio station. The recording was broadcast nationally and, after hearing it, a representative of the Fálkinn record label offered Björk a recording contract. Her debut record, Björk, considered juvenilia, (Note: Attributed to multiple references:) was recorded when she was 11 years old and was released in Iceland in December 1977.

During her teens, after the diffusion of punk rock music in Iceland, Björk formed the all-girl punk band Spit and Snot. In 1980, she formed a jazz fusion group, Exodus, collaborated in another group, JAM80, and graduated from music school. In 1981, she and bassist Jakob Magnússon formed another group, Tappi Tíkarrass ("Cork the Bitch's Ass" in Icelandic), and released the EP Bitið fast í vitið ("Bite Hard Into the Mind" in Icelandic), in August 1982. Their album Miranda was released in December 1983. The group was featured in the documentary Rokk í Reykjavík, with Björk being featured on the cover of the VHS release. Around this time, Björk met guitarist Þór Eldon and surrealist group Medusa, which also included poet Sjón, with whom she started a lifelong collaboration and formed a group, Rokka Rokka Drum. She described her time as part of Medusa as "a gorgeous D.I.Y. organic university: extreme fertility!" Björk appeared as a featured artist on "Afi", a track from the Björgvin Gíslason 1983 record Örugglega.

Due to the imminent cancelling of radio show Áfangar, two radio personalities, Ásmundur Jónsson and Guðni Rúnar, requested musicians to play on a last live radio show. Björk joined with Einar Melax (from the group Fan Houtens Kókó), Einar Örn Benediktsson (from Purrkur Pillnikk), Guðlaugur Kristinn Óttarsson and Sigtryggur Baldursson (from Þeyr), and Birgir Mogensen (from Spilafífl) to perform in the concert. The group developed a gothic rock sound. During this experience, Björk began to develop her vocalisation – punctuated by howls and shrieks. The project performed as Gott kvöld during the concert. When they later decided to keep playing together as a group, they used the name Kukl ("Sorcery" in Icelandic). Björk's acquaintance gave the group their studio to record in and released their first single in 1983. Their first big performance at a festival in Iceland was headlined by English anarchist punk band Crass, whose record label, Crass Records offered the band a record deal. The Eye was released in 1984, followed by a two-month tour in Europe, which also included a performance at Roskilde Festival in Denmark. This made Kukl the first Icelandic band to play at the festival. During this period, Björk published a hand-coloured book of poems. Um Úrnat frá Björk was distributed in 1984.

=== 1985–1992: the Sugarcubes ===
Kukl's second album, Holidays in Europe (The Naughty Nought), came out in 1986. The band split up due to personal conflict, with Björk keeping a collaboration with Guðlaugur, which was named the Elgar Sisters. Some of the songs they recorded ended up as B-sides to Björk solo singles.

Björk had her first acting role on The Juniper Tree (filmed in 1986, released in 1990), a tale of witchcraft based on the Brothers Grimm story, directed by Nietzchka Keene. Björk played the role of Margit, a girl whose mother has been killed for practising witchcraft. That summer, former band members Einar Örn and Eldon formed the arts collective Smekkleysa ("Bad Taste" in Icelandic), created with the intention of being both a record label and book publishing company. Various friends, namely Melax and Sigtryggur from Kukl, along with Bragi Ólafsson and Friðrik Erlingson from Purrkur Pillnikk, joined the group and a band coalesced in the collective solely to make money. They were initially called Þukl, but they were advertised as Kukl (the name of the previous band). At a later concert supporting Icelandic band Stuðmenn, they referred to themselves as Sykurmolarnir ("The Sugarcubes" in Icelandic). Their first double A-side single, "Einn mol'á mann", which contained the songs "Ammæli" ("Birthday") and "Köttur" ("Cat"), was released on 21 November 1986, Björk's 21st birthday.

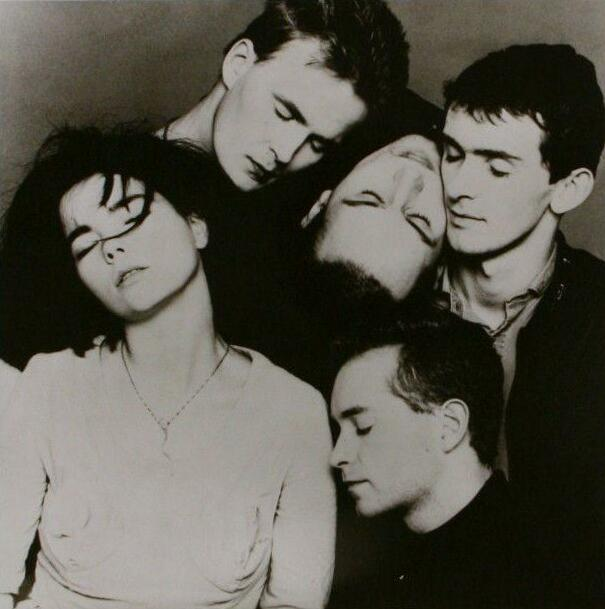
Björk in a publicity photo with the Sugarcubes in 1988

At the end of that year, the Sugarcubes signed with One Little Indian. Their first English single, "Birthday", was released in the United Kingdom on 17 August 1987; a week later, it was declared single of the week by Melody Maker. The Sugarcubes also signed a distribution deal with Elektra Records in the United States and recorded their first album, Life's Too Good, which was released in 1988. After the release of the album, Eldon and Björk divorced soon after the birth of their child despite being in the same group. The album went on to sell more than one million copies worldwide. Björk contributed as a background vocalist on 1987 album Loftmynd by Megas, for whom she provided background vocals also on his subsequent album, Höfuðlausnir (1988), and Hættuleg hljómsveit & glæpakvendið Stella (1990).

In the last quarter of 1988, the Sugarcubes toured North America to positive reception. On 15 October, the band appeared on Saturday Night Live. Björk alone contributed a rendition of the Christmas song "Jólakötturinn" ("The Christmas Cat") by Ingibjörg Þorbergs on the compilation Hvít er borg og bær. The band went on hiatus following the lack of reception of Here Today, Tomorrow Next Week! (1989) and a lengthy international tour. During this time, Björk started working on her solo projects. In 1990 she provided background vocals on Gums by Bless. In the same year, she recorded Gling-Gló, a collection of popular jazz and original work, with the jazz group Tríó Guðmundar Ingólfssonar, which as of 2011 was still her best-selling album in her home country. Björk also contributed vocals to 808 State's album ex:el, with whom she cultivated her interest in house music. She contributed vocals on the songs "Qmart" and on "Ooops", which was released as a single in the UK in 1991. She also contributed vocals to the song "Falling", on the album Island by Current 93 and Hilmar Örn Hilmarsson. In the same year she met harpist Corky Hale, with whom she had a recording session that ended up as a track on her future album Debut.

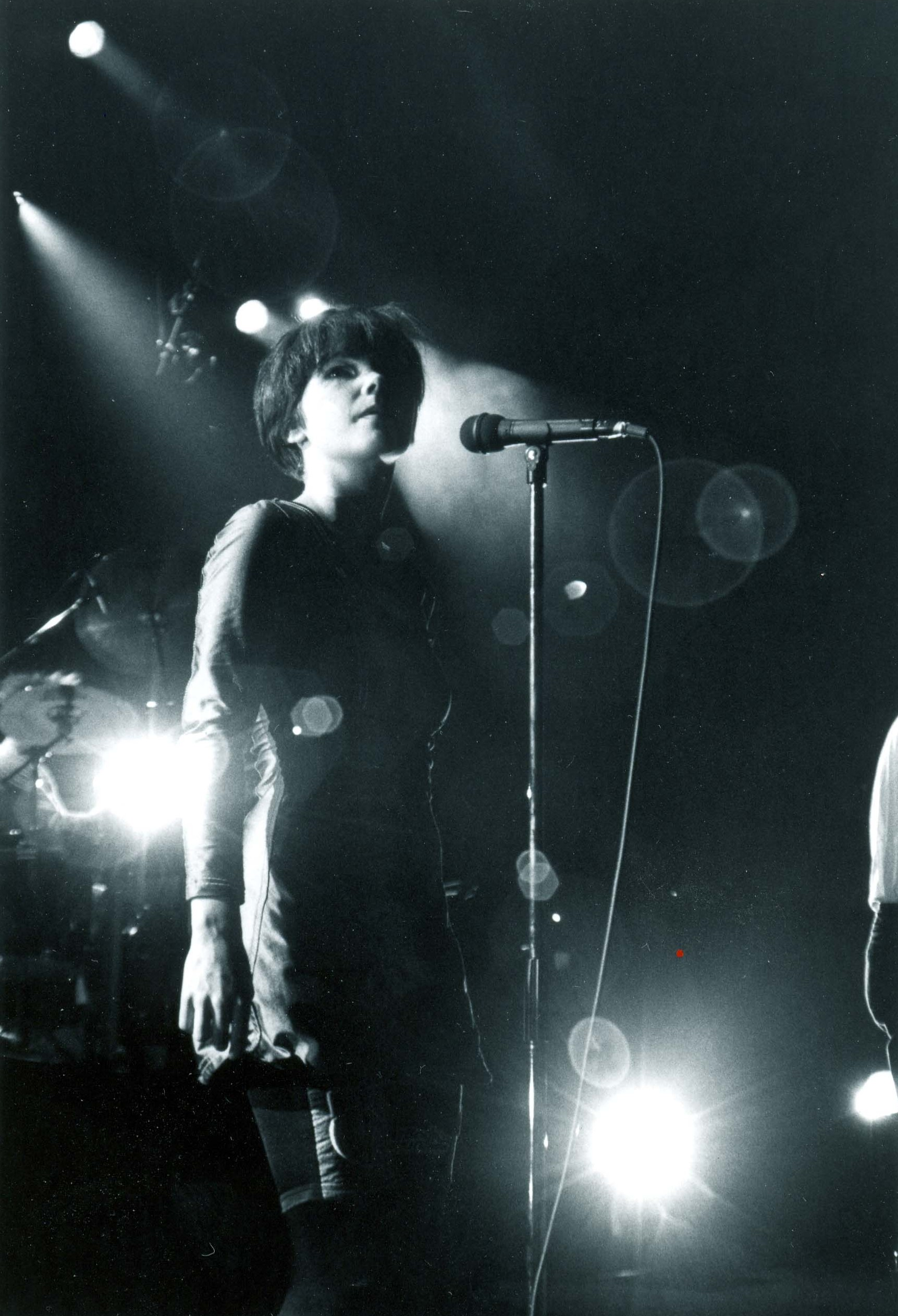
Björk performing in Japan with the Sugarcubes in 1992

At this point, Björk had decided to leave the band to pursue her solo career, but their contract included the making of one last album, Stick Around for Joy (1992), with a subsequent promotional tour, which she agreed to do. Björk was featured on two tracks of the soundtrack for the 1992 film Remote Control (known as Sódóma Reykjavík in Iceland). The Sugarcubes split up after they played one last show in Reykjavík. Rolling Stone called them "the biggest rock band to emerge from Iceland".

=== 1993–1995: Debut and Post ===
Björk moved to London to pursue a solo career. She began working with producer Nellee Hooper (who had produced Massive Attack, among others). Their partnership produced Björk's first international solo hit, "Human Behaviour", a dance track based on a guitar rhythm sampled from Antônio Carlos Jobim. In most countries, the song was not widely played on radio, but its music video gained strong airtime on MTV. It was directed by Michel Gondry, who became a frequent collaborator for Björk. Her first solo album, Debut, was released in June 1993 to positive reviews; it was named album of the year by NME and eventually went platinum in the United States.

Debut was the leap Björk made from being in numerous bands during her teens and early twenties to her solo career. She named the album Debut to signify a start of something new. Debut had a mix of songs Björk had been writing since she was a teenager, as well as more recent lyrical collaborations with Hooper. The dance-oriented album varied in instrumentation. One single from the album, "Venus as a Boy", featured a Bollywood-influenced string arrangement. Björk covered the jazz standard "Like Someone in Love" to the accompaniment of a harp, and the final track, "The Anchor Song", was sung with only a saxophone ensemble for accompaniment.

At the 1994 Brit Awards, Björk won the awards for Best International Female and Best International Newcomer. The success of Debut enabled her to collaborate with British and other artists on one-off tracks. She worked with David Arnold on "Play Dead", the theme to the 1993 film The Young Americans (which appeared as a bonus track on a re-release of Debut), collaborated on two songs for Tricky's Nearly God project, appeared on the track "Lilith" for the album Not for Threes by Plaid, and co-wrote the song "Bedtime Story" for Madonna's 1994 album Bedtime Stories. Björk also had an uncredited role as a runway model in the 1994 film Prêt-à-Porter.

Post was Björk's second solo studio album. Released in June 1995, the album was produced in conjunction with Nellee Hooper, Tricky, Graham Massey of 808 State, and electronica producer Howie B. Building on the success of Debut, Björk continued to pursue different sounds, taking particular interest in dance and techno. Production by Tricky and Howie B also provided trip hop/electronica-like sounds on tracks like "Possibly Maybe" and "Enjoy". It was these producers' influence along with older friend Graham Massey that inspired Björk to create material like the storming industrial beats of "Army of Me". The album was ranked number 7 in Spin's "Top 90 Albums of the '90s" list and number 75 in its "100 Greatest Albums, 1985–2005" list. Post and Homogenic were placed back to back on Pitchfork Media's "Top Albums of the '90s" list at numbers 21 and 20, respectively. In 2003, the album was ranked number 373 on Rolling Stone magazine's list of the 500 greatest albums of all time. During this period, the press exalted Björk's eccentricity by creating a "pixie" persona around her, a descriptor she later confronted with her following albums.

Although Björk continued to receive more mainstream attention for her videos than her singles, Post included several UK pop hits and was eventually certified platinum in the US. Björk also contributed to the 1995 Hector Zazou collaborative album Chansons des mers froides, singing the traditional Icelandic song "Vísur Vatnsenda-Rósu".

=== 1996–2000: Homogenic and Dancer in the Dark ===
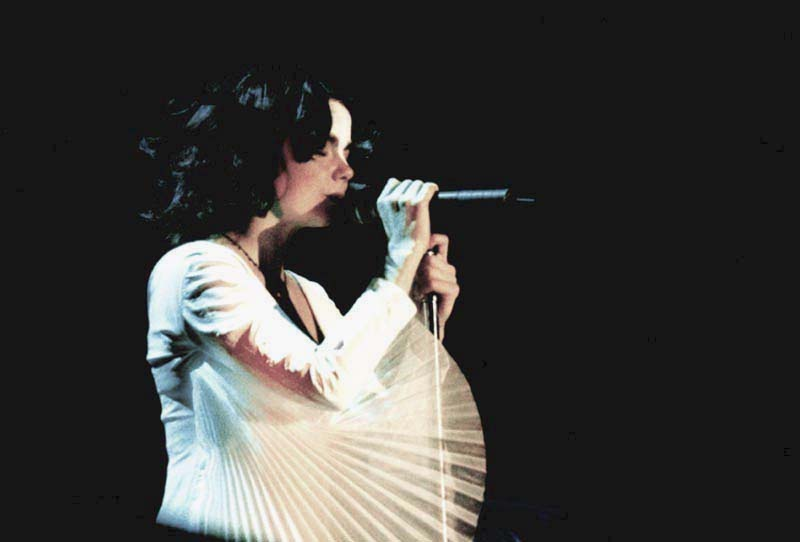
Björk performing during the Homogenic tour in 1997

Björk left London for Spain in 1996, where she recorded the album Homogenic, released in 1997. Björk worked with producers Mark Bell of LFO and Howie B, as well as Eumir Deodato; numerous remixes followed. Homogenic is regarded as one of Björk's most experimental and extroverted works, with enormous beats that reflect the landscape of Iceland, most notably in the song "Jóga", which fuses lush strings with rocky electronic crunches. The album was certified gold in the US in 2001. The album was backed by a string of music videos, several of which received airplay on MTV. The video for "Bachelorette" was directed by frequent collaborator Michel Gondry, while "All Is Full of Love" was directed by Chris Cunningham. The single "All is Full of Love" was also the first DVD single to ever be released in the US, which paved the way for other artists to include DVD video and other multimedia features with their singles. Björk began to write more personally, saying "I realised that I'd come to the end of the extrovert thing. I had to go home and search for myself again."

In 1999, Björk was asked to write and produce the musical score for the film Dancer in the Dark, a musical drama about an immigrant named Selma who is struggling to pay for an operation to prevent her son from going blind. Director Lars von Trier eventually asked her to consider playing the role of Selma, convincing her that the only true way to capture the character of Selma was to have the composer of the music play the character. Eventually, she accepted. Filming began in early 1999, and the film debuted in 2000 at the 53rd Cannes Film Festival. The film received the Palme d'Or, and Björk received the Best Actress Award for her role. It was reported that the shoot was so physically and emotionally tiring that she vowed never to act again. Björk later stated that she always wanted to do one musical in her life, and Dancer in the Dark was the one. The soundtrack Björk created for the film was released with the title Selmasongs. The album features a duet with Thom Yorke of Radiohead titled "I've Seen It All", which was nominated for an Academy Award for Best Original Song and was performed at the 2001 Oscars (without Yorke), while Björk was wearing her celebrated swan dress.

=== 2001–2003: Vespertine and Greatest Hits ===
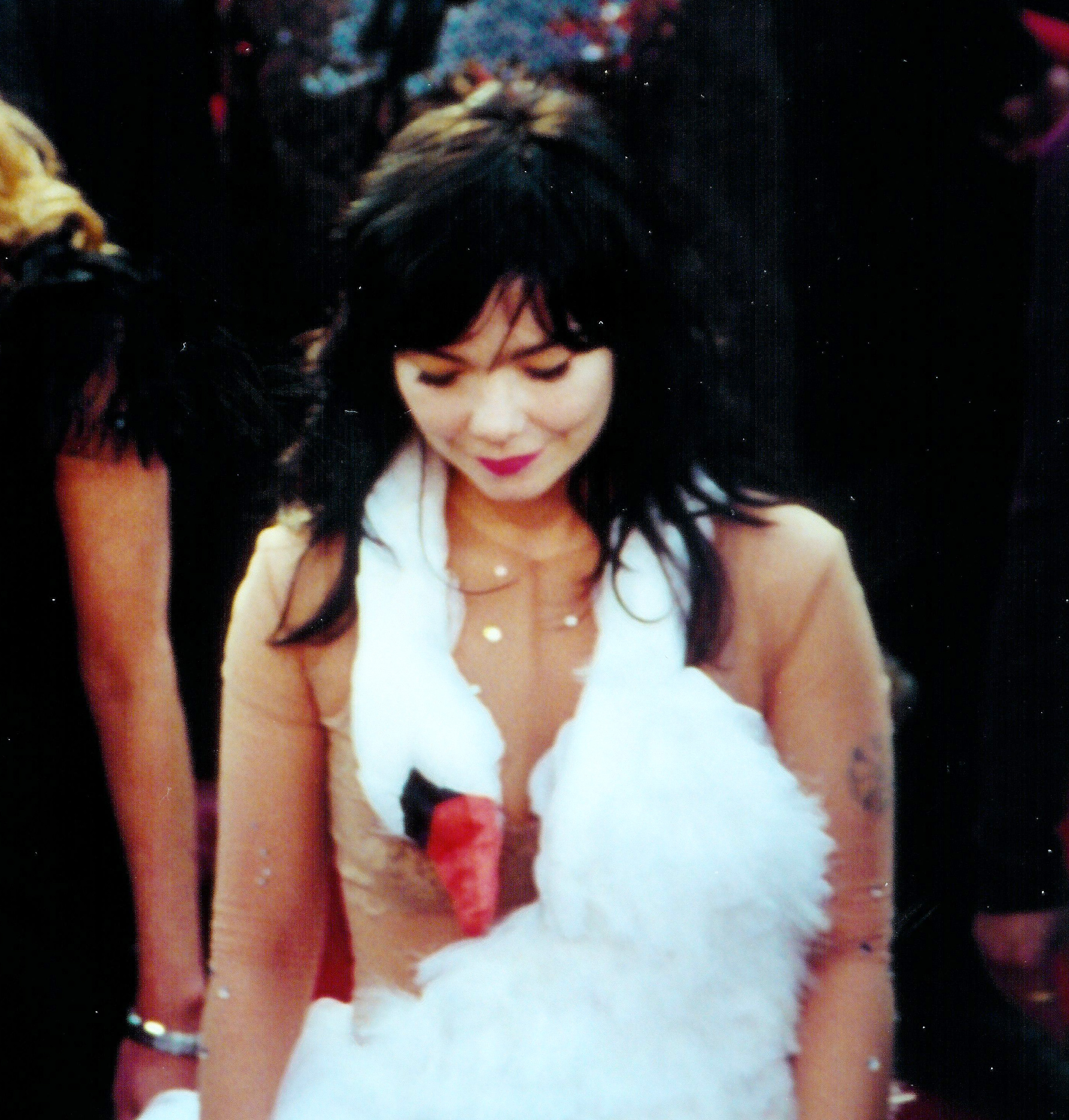
Björk at the 2001 Academy Awards, wearing her swan dress

In 2001, Björk released the album Vespertine. It featured chamber orchestras, choirs, hushed vocals, microbeats made from household sounds, and personal, vulnerable themes. For the album, she collaborated with experimental musicians such as Matmos, Denmark-based DJ Thomas Knak, and harpist Zeena Parkins. Lyrical sources included the works of American poet E. E. Cummings, the American independent filmmaker Harmony Korine, and English playwright Sarah Kane's penultimate play, Crave. To coincide with the album's release, an eponymous coffee table book of loose prose and photographs was published. Björk embarked on the Vespertine world tour. The shows were held in theatres and opera houses in order to have "the best acoustics possible." She was accompanied by Matmos, Parkins and an Inuit choir, which she had held auditions for on a trip to Greenland prior to the tour. At the time, Vespertine was Björk's fastest selling album to date, having sold two million copies by the end of 2001.

Vespertine spawned three singles: "Hidden Place", "Pagan Poetry", and "Cocoon". MTV2 played the album's first video, "Hidden Place", which was subsequently released as a DVD single. The next video, for "Pagan Poetry", brought Björk to an even higher level of controversy with the channel. The video features graphic piercings, Björk's exposed nipples, and simulated fellatio. As a result, the clip was banned from MTV. In 2002, it was aired unedited as part of a late night special on MTV2 titled, "Most Controversial Music Videos". The video for "Cocoon" also featured a seemingly naked Björk (actually wearing a close fitting bodysuit), this time with her nipples secreting a red thread that eventually enveloped her in a cocoon. The video was directed by Japanese artist Eiko Ishioka and was not aired by MTV. She was invited to record "Gollum's Song" for the film The Lord of the Rings: The Two Towers but declined the invitation, as she was then pregnant; the song was instead recorded by another Icelander, Emilíana Torrini.

In 2002, the CD box set Family Tree was issued. It comprised selected rarities as well as previously unreleased versions of her compositions, including her work with the Brodsky Quartet. Also released alongside Family Tree was the album Greatest Hits, a retrospective of the previous 10 years of her solo career as deemed by the public. The songs on the album were chosen by Björk's fans through a poll on her website. A DVD edition of the CD was also released. It contained all of Björk's solo music videos up to that point. The new single from the set, "It's in Our Hands" charted in the UK at number 37. The video, directed by Spike Jonze, features a heavily pregnant Björk. She gave birth to daughter Isadora Bjarkardottir Barney on 3 October 2002. Björk and the Brodsky Quartet recorded "Prayer of the Heart", a composition written for her by composer John Tavener in 2001, and it was played then for a slide show presentation in 2003 for the American photographer, Nan Goldin. In 2003, Björk released a box set, Live Box, consisting of four CDs containing live recordings of her previous albums and a DVD featuring a video of one track from each CD. Each of the four CDs was later released separately at a reduced price.

=== 2004–2006: Medúlla and Drawing Restraint 9 ===
In August 2004, Björk released Medúlla. During production, Björk decided the album would work best as an entirely vocal-based album. This initial plan was modified, as the majority of the sounds on the album are indeed created by vocalists but several feature prominent basic electronic programming, as well as the occasional musical instrument. Björk used the vocal skills of throat singer Tanya Tagaq, hip hop beatboxer Rahzel, Japanese beatboxer Dokaka, avant-rocker Mike Patton, Soft Machine drummer/singer Robert Wyatt, and several choirs. She again appropriated text from E. E. Cummings for the song "Sonnets/Unrealities XI". At the time, Medúlla became her highest-charting album in the US, debuting at number 14.

In August 2004, Björk performed the song "Oceania" at the Opening Ceremony of the 2004 Summer Olympics in Athens. As she sang, her dress slowly unfurled to reveal a 10,000 square foot (900 m^{2}) map of the world, which she let flow over all of the Olympic athletes. The song "Oceania" was written especially for the occasion and features the talents of Shlomo, a Leeds-based beatboxer, and a London choir. An alternative version of the song began circulating on the Internet with additional vocals by Kelis. It originally appeared on the promotional "Oceania" single released to radio stations and later became available to the public as a B-side of the "Who Is It" single, which charted at number 26 in the UK. This was followed in early 2005 by "Triumph of a Heart", charting at number 31. A video for the potential next single, "Where Is the Line", was filmed in collaboration with the Icelandic artist Gabríela Friðriksdóttir in late 2004. This was initially a sequence from an art installation movie of the artists but was released exclusively on the Medúlla Videos DVD as an official promo for the track.

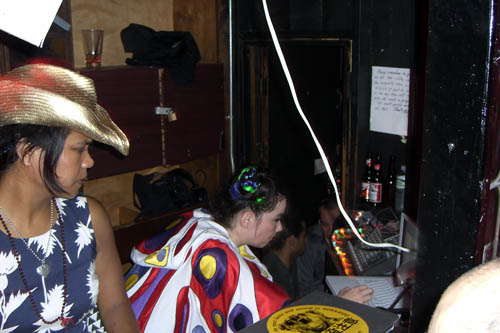
Björk DJing in 2006

In 2005, Björk collaborated with partner Matthew Barney on the experimental art film Drawing Restraint 9, a dialogueless exploration of Japanese culture. Björk and Barney both appear in the film, playing two occidental guests on a Japanese factory whaling vessel who ultimately transform into two whales. She is also responsible for the film's soundtrack, her second after Selmasongs. Björk also appeared in the 2005 documentary Screaming Masterpiece, which delves into the Icelandic music scene. The movie features archive footage of the Sugarcubes and Tappi Tíkarrass and an ongoing conversation with Björk herself. During this era, Björk earned another BRIT Awards nomination for Best International Female Solo Artist. She was also awarded the Inspiration Award at the Annual Q magazine Awards in October 2005, accepting the prize from Robert Wyatt, with whom she collaborated on Medúlla. In 2006, Björk remastered her first three solo studio albums (Debut, Post, Homogenic) and her two soundtrack albums (Selmasongs and Drawing Restraint 9) in 5.1 surround sound for a re-issue in a new box-set titled Surrounded, released on 27 June. Vespertine and Medúlla were already available in 5.1 as either DVD-A or SACD but are also included in the box set in repackaged format. The DualDiscs were also released separately. Björk's former band, the Sugarcubes, reunited for a one-night-only concert in Reykjavík on 17 November 2006. Profits from the concert were donated to the Sugarcubes' former label, Smekkleysa, who according to Björk's press statement, "continue to work on a non-profit basis for the future betterment of Icelandic music".

=== 2007–2010: Volta ===
Björk contributed a cover of Joni Mitchell's song "The Boho Dance" to the album A Tribute to Joni Mitchell (2007). Director and previous collaborator Michel Gondry asked Björk to star in his film The Science of Sleep, but she declined. The role was played by Charlotte Gainsbourg instead. Björk starred in Gunar Karlsson's 2007 animated film Anna and the Moods along with Terry Jones and Damon Albarn.

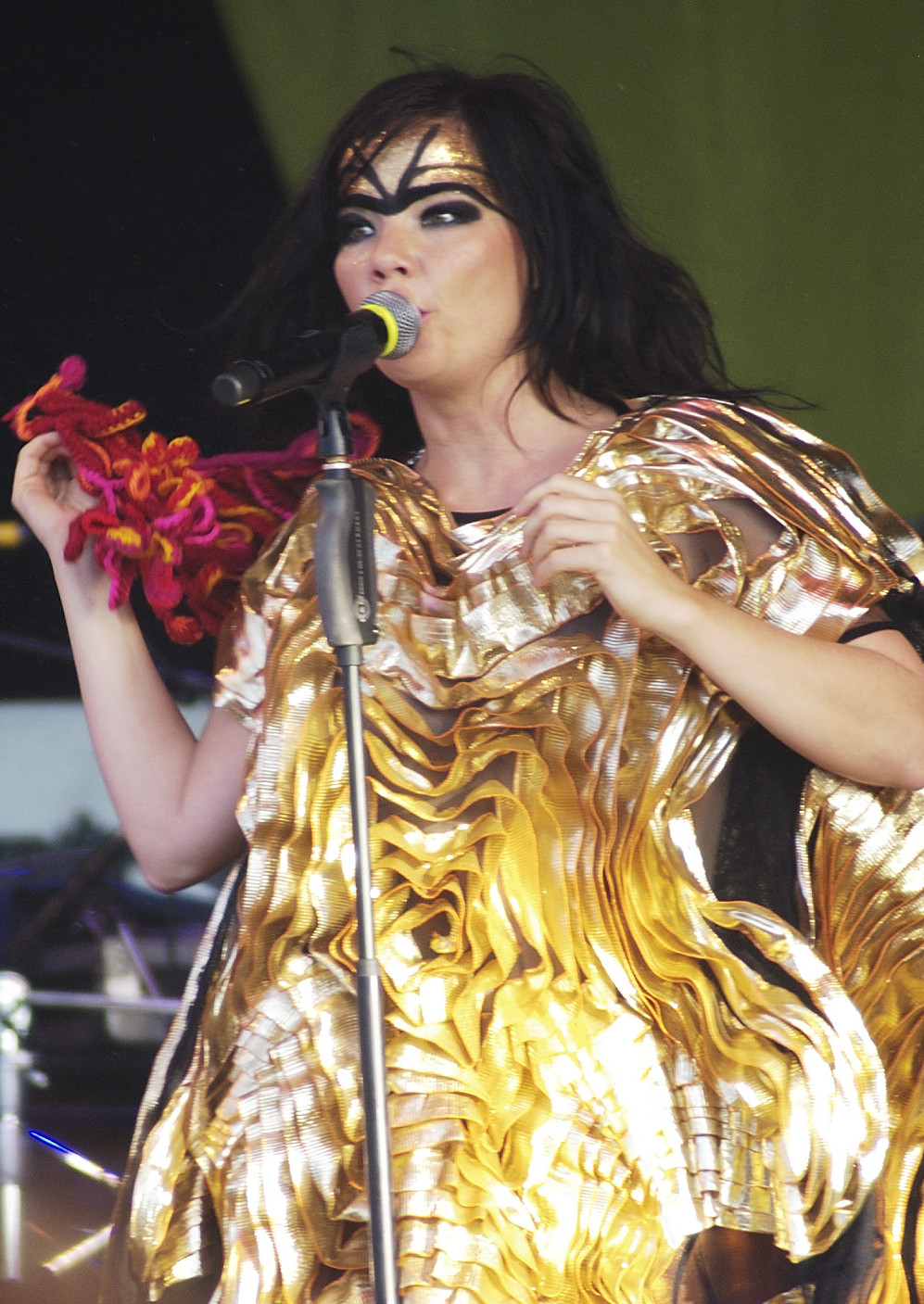
Björk performing at the Big Day Out festival in Melbourne, 2008

Björk's sixth full-length studio album, Volta, was released on 1 May 2007. It features 10 tracks. The album features input from hip hop producer Timbaland, singer Anohni, poet Sjón, electronic beat programmer Mark Bell, kora master Toumani Diabaté, Congolese thumb piano band Konono No 1, pipa player Min Xiaofen, and, on several songs, an all-female ensemble from Iceland performing brass compositions. It also uses the Reactable, a novel "tangible-interface" synthesizer from the Universitat Pompeu Fabra in Barcelona, which on Volta is played by Damian Taylor. The first single from the album, "Earth Intruders", was released digitally on 9 April 2007 and became her second-ever Billboard Hot 100 entry in the United States. Volta debuted at number nine on the Billboard 200 albums chart, becoming her first top 10 album in the US, netting week-one sales of 43,000. The album also reached number three on the French albums chart with 20,600 albums sold in its first week, and number seven in the UK Albums Chart with 20,456 units sold. The second single from the album, "Innocence", was digitally released on 23 July 2007, with an accompanying music video chosen from a contest conducted through her official website. "Declare Independence" was released on 1 January 2008 in a super deluxe package including two 12" vinyls, a CD, and a DVD featuring Gondry's "Declare Independence" video. "Wanderlust" was subsequently released in a similar format, featuring Encyclopedia Pictura's short film directed for the track, shot in stereoscopic 3D. The fifth single released from the album was "The Dull Flame of Desire", featuring vocals by Anohni.

Björk then completed the 18-month The Volta tour, performing at many festivals and returning to Latin America after nine years, playing in Rio de Janeiro, São Paulo, Curitiba, Guadalajara, Bogotá, Lima, Santiago de Chile, and Buenos Aires. She also returned to Australia and New Zealand for the first time in 12 years in January 2008 with the Big Day Out Festival. She played a one-off show at the Sydney Opera House as part of the Sydney Festival. Her music was featured in the 2008 documentary Horizons: The Art of Steinunn Þórarinsdóttir directed by Frank Cantor.

Announced via an eBay auction, a new Björk track was revealed under the title "Náttúra". Björk commented the song was intended "to encourage active support for a more environmental approach to Iceland's natural resources." The song was initially labelled as a new single by Björk with backing vocals from Radiohead frontman Thom Yorke. Björk's official website later stated that the single would be released on 27 October 2008 through iTunes, but the track was eventually made available exclusively at nattura.grapewire.net. In a statement released by bjork.com, a limited edition box set titled Voltaïc from One Little Indian Records was announced, with a release date in North America of 20 April 2009 (later delayed to mid-June). The release consists of various live recordings of performances in Paris and Reykjavík. The live set was also recorded at the Olympic Studio in London. The first disc is audio of songs from the Volta tour performed live at Olympic Studios; the second disc contains video of the Volta tour live in Paris and live in Reykjavík; the third disc contains "The Volta Videos" and the video competition; the fourth is The Volta Mixes CD.

In May 2010, the Royal Swedish Academy of Music announced that Björk was to receive the Polar Music Prize alongside Ennio Morricone. A month later, Björk, along with Dirty Projectors, announced that they would be collaborating on a joint EP titled Mount Wittenberg Orca, which was released on 30 June, to raise money for marine conservation. In September 2010, Björk released "The Comet Song" as part of the soundtrack for the movie Moomins and the Comet Chase. Also in 2010, she dueted with fellow Icelander (and One Little Indian labelmate) Ólöf Arnalds on a track called "Surrender" from Arnalds's new album, Innundir skinni, and performed a duet with Anohni on the Antony and the Johnsons album Swanlights. The song is titled "Flétta". On 20 September 2010, Björk performed her version of "Gloomy Sunday" at designer Alexander McQueen's memorial in St. Paul's Cathedral in London. On 7 December 2010, a previously unreleased song called "Trance" was released by Björk as the backing track of a short film made by Nick Knight titled "To Lee, with Love", as a tribute to McQueen, with whom Björk collaborated on multiple occasions.

=== 2011–2016: Biophilia and Vulnicura ===
Björk appeared on Átta Raddir, one of Jónas Sen's TV shows. The episode aired on 27 February 2011. The shows are produced by RÚV, Iceland's public broadcasting service. In the show Björk performed eight songs, including "Sun in My Mouth", which had not previously been performed live.

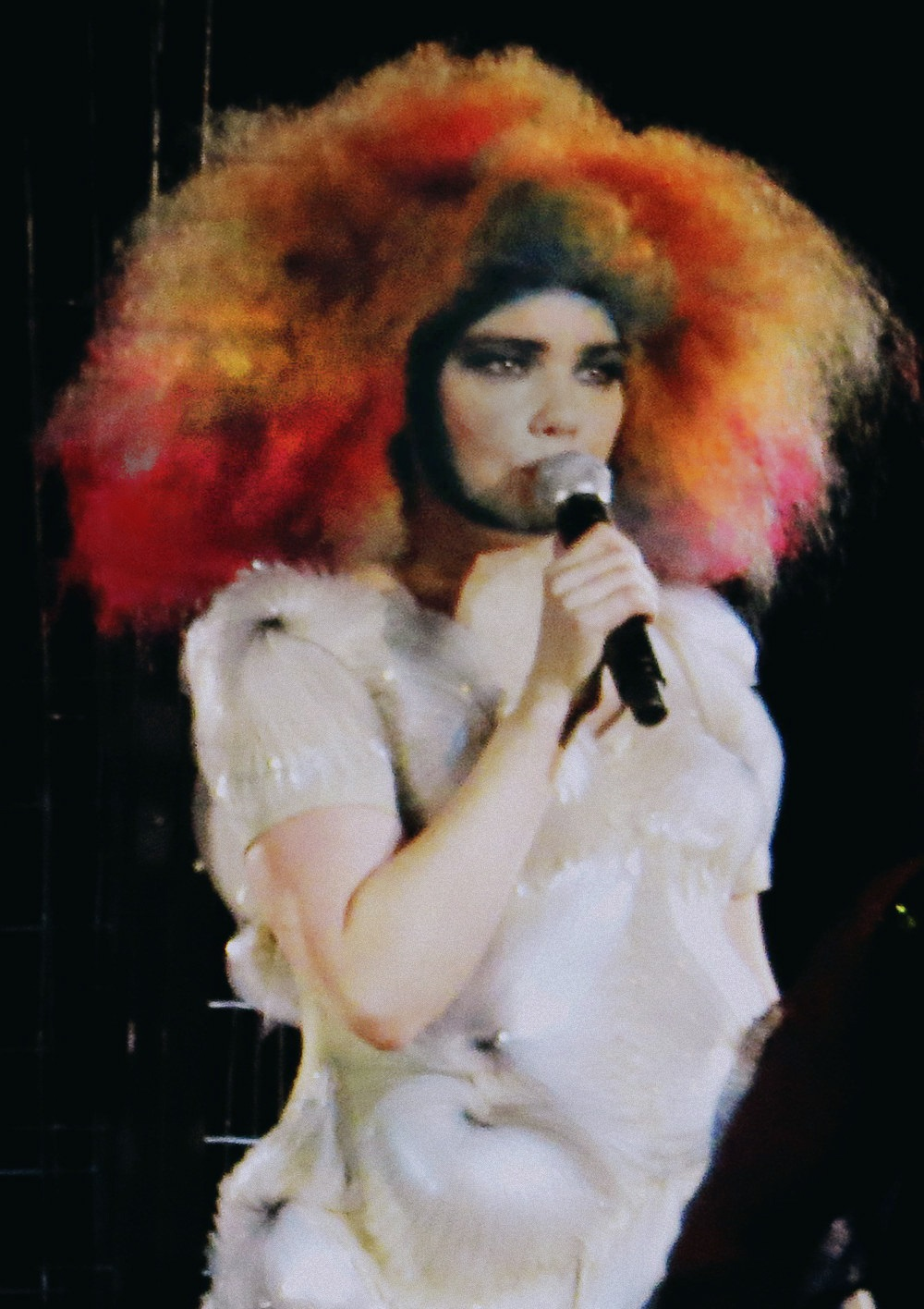
Björk performing at the Cirque en Chantier in Paris (February 2013)

Biophilia was released in 2011. The album project combined music with technological innovation and themes of science and nature, including an "app album", educational collaborations with children and specialised live performance, debuting in Manchester, United Kingdom at the Manchester International Festival on 30 June. This was the first part of the Biophilia tour that toured the world for two years.

In June 2011, the first single from Biophilia, "Crystalline", was released. The song was composed using one of the several instruments custom built for the project, the "gameleste", a celesta modified with elements of gamelan. A central part of Biophilia was a series of interactive iPad apps made by programmers and designers, one app for each of the 10 songs on the new album. The second single, "Cosmogony", which served as the "mother app" for all the others, was released on 19 July 2011, followed by "Virus" and "Moon". Biophilia was the first album to be released, in October 2011, as a series of interactive apps. Also in part of the project was Björk's Biophilia education programme, which consisted of workshops for schoolchildren age 10 to 12 that explore the intersection of music and science. The Reykjavík City Board of Education brought the programme to all schools in the city over the next three years.

She released the 2012 remix album Bastards. It featured remixes by Death Grips and Syrian musician Omar Souleyman. In 2013, Björk featured in a Channel 4 documentary along with Sir David Attenborough called When Björk Met Attenborough, as part of their Mad4Music season of programmes. Björk and Attenborough discussed the human relationship with music, focusing around Biophilia and also featuring scientist Oliver Sacks. In 2014, the apps were the first ever to be inducted into the Museum of Modern Art's permanent collection. In June, Björk recorded original vocal samples for Death Grips, which they used on all eight songs of Niggas on the Moon, the first part of their double LP, The Powers That B. In late 2014, a concert film, Björk: Biophilia Live, was released worldwide at more than 400 cinemas.

Björk worked with producers Arca and the Haxan Cloak on her eighth studio album, titled Vulnicura. On 18 January 2015, just days after being publicly announced and two months ahead of its scheduled release, a supposed full version of the album leaked online. In an effort to salvage potential losses in sales due to the leak and to allow fans to hear the album in superior quality, it was made available worldwide on 20 January 2015 on iTunes. Vulnicura is a portrayal of her breakup with former partner Matthew Barney, with lyrics that are emotionally raw in comparison to the abstract concerns of her previous album. Its surprise release was positively compared to recent album releases from Madonna and Beyoncé, the former of whom also released her album to iTunes after being leaked, and the latter of whom wanted to revolutionize how albums were released and consumed. Björk began her world tour in March 2015 at Carnegie Hall performing "Black Lake" and other tracks from Vulnicura as well as several from her back catalog with accompaniment from the ensemble Alarm Will Sound, Arca on electronics (on festival dates the Haxan Cloak took over) and percussionist Manu Delago. After completing its New York residency, the tour travelled to Europe before ending in August 2015.

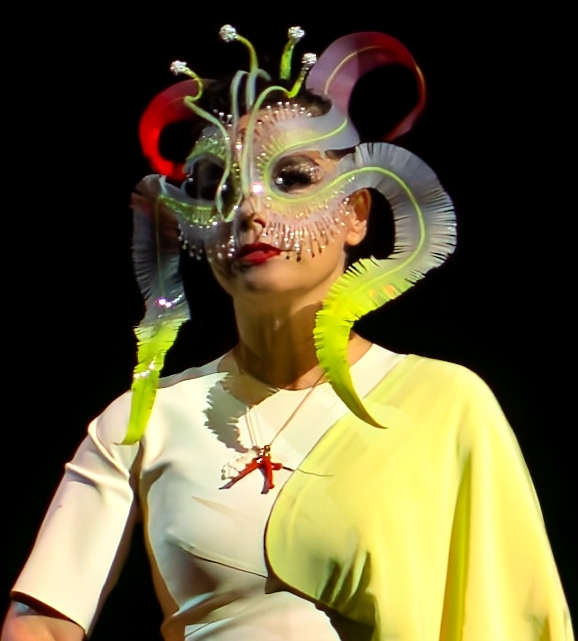
Björk performing at the Royal Albert Hall in 2016

New York's MoMA hosted a retrospective exhibition from 8 March to 7 June 2015 that chronicled Björk's career from Debut to Biophilia; however, aspects of Vulnicura were included but not previously announced. The retrospective consisted of four parts: the Biophilia instruments (Tesla coil, MIDI controlled organ, the newly created Gameleste, and gravity harp) were on display in the lobby of the museum and played automatically throughout the day; the MoMA commissioned video installation "Black Lake", directed by Andrew Thomas Huang, which consisted of two complementary edits of the "Black Lake" video screened in a small room with 49 speakers hidden in the walls and ceiling; a Cinema room showcasing most of Björk's music videos in high definition; and the Songlines walking exhibit that showcased Björk's notebooks, costumes and props from throughout her career. A book titled Björk: Archives, documenting the content of the exhibition, was published in March. In addition to the "Black Lake" video, videos for "Lionsong" (which played in the Cinema room of the MoMA exhibit), "Stonemilker" (a 360-degree VR video) "Family", and "Mouth Mantra" were also produced for the album, as well as a three-part remix series available digitally and on limited edition vinyls. No traditional singles were released for Vulnicura. In December, the "Stonemilker VR App" was released for iOS devices, featuring an exclusive strings mix of the song. It is the same version on display at MoMA earlier that year.

On 2 October 2015, Vulnicura Strings was announced. The album serves as a purely acoustic companion to Vulnicura, and features additional string arrangements plus the viola organista, a unique string instrument played on a keyboard designed by Leonardo da Vinci. It was released on 6 November 2015 on CD and digital and 4 December 2015 on vinyl. A week later, Vulnicura Live was announced on double CD / double LP sets sold exclusively through Rough Trade record shops. The set sold out online five days after being announced but limited quantities were made available in store in London and Brooklyn. Each format is limited to 1,000 copies each, making it one of the rarest physical releases of Björk's recent career. The CD was released on 13 November 2015 with the picture disc vinyls released a week later. On 7 December 2015, Vulnicura was nominated for the Grammy Award for Best Alternative Music Album. On 15 July 2016, a standard "commercial" edition of Vulnicura Live was released, featuring the same performances but newly mixed and with different artwork. A luxury version of Vulnicura Live was released on 23 September. The performance of "Come to Me" from the album was also included in the box set 7-inches for Planned Parenthood in support of the women's health organization.

Björk launched Björk Digital in June 2016, a virtual reality exhibit showcasing all the VR videos completed for Vulnicura thus far, including the world premiere of "Notget", directed by Warren du Preez and Nick Thornton Jones, at Carriageworks for Vivid Sydney 2016 in Sydney, Australia. She DJ'd the opening night party and did the same when the show travelled to Tokyo, Japan on 29 June, showing at Miraikan. During the Miraikan residency, Björk made history by featuring in the world's first ever virtual reality live stream broadcast on YouTube. She gave a live performance of Vulnicura's final song "Quicksand", and the footage was incorporated into the "Quicksand" VR experience. Björk Digital has travelled the world with stops in London, Montreal, Houston, Los Angeles and Barcelona.

=== 2017–present: Utopia, Cornucopia, and Fossora ===
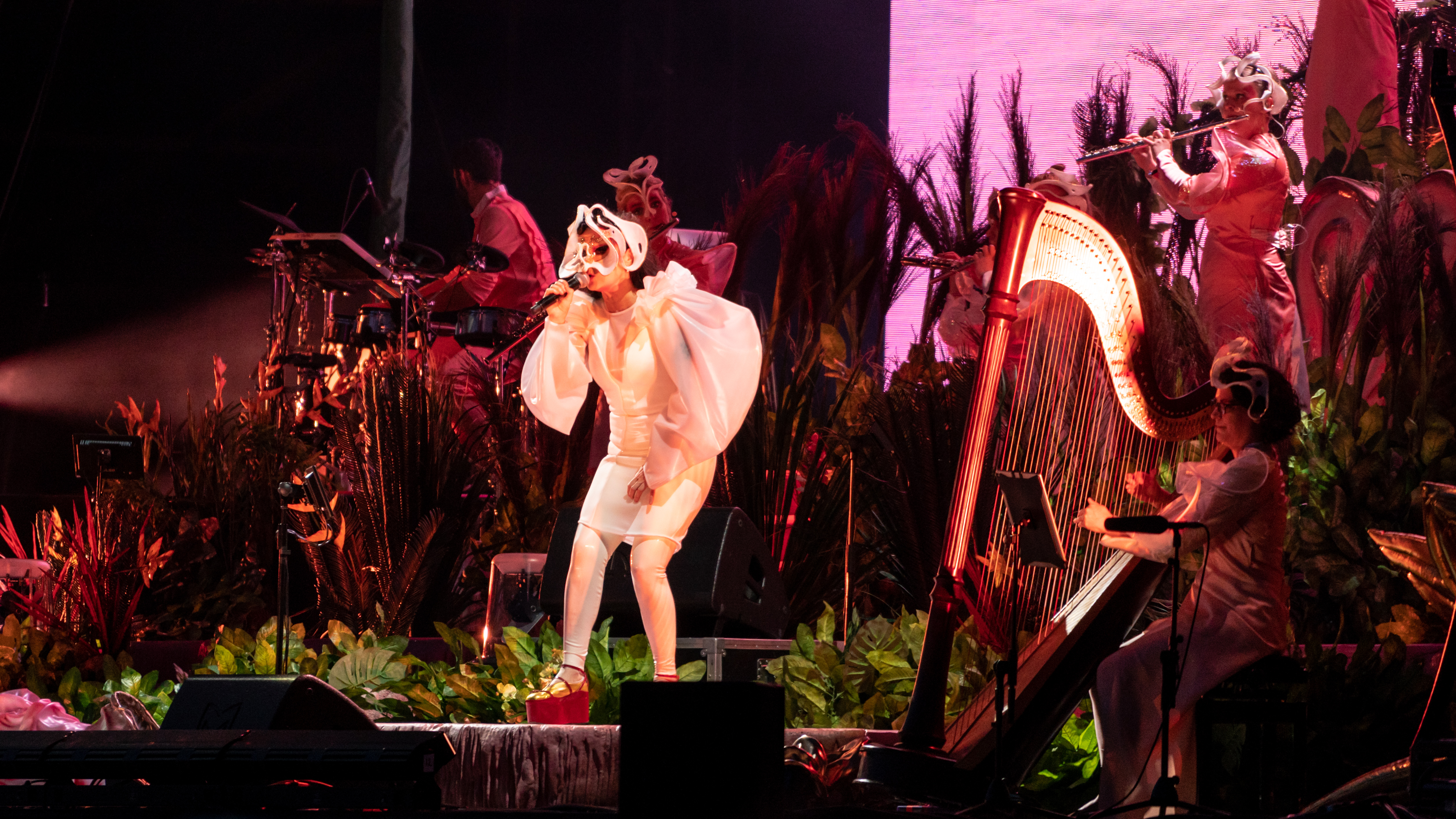
Björk performing at the All Points East festival in 2018

On 2 August 2017, Björk announced with a handwritten note on her social media the imminent release of a new album. The announcement coincided with an interview for Dazed's autumn 2017 cover issue in which Björk talked about the new album. The lead single, "The Gate", was released on 15 September 2017. Its video was directed by Andrew Thomas Huang. The same day of the single's release, Björk announced the album title, Utopia, during an interview with Nowness.

Utopia was released on 24 November 2017. She described it as her "Tinder album" and stated that "it's about that search (for utopia) – and about being in love. Spending time with a person you enjoy is when the dream becomes real." Björk added that her previous album was "hell" – it was like divorce!", stating, "So we [were] doing paradise [...] We have done hell, we have earned some points." She produced the album with Arca, whom she collaborated with on Vulnicura. Björk has described her collaborative journey with Arca as "the strongest musical relationship [she's] had", likening it to that of Joni Mitchell and Jaco Pastorius during the albums Hejira and Don Juan's Reckless Daughter ("It's that synergy when two people lose their ego"), which have both been praised by Björk. Three additional music videos were released in 2017: "Blissing Me", "Utopia" and "Arisen My Senses" with the former and latter also receiving limited edition remix EPs. Utopia was nominated for Best Alternative Music Album at the 61st Annual Grammy Awards, making Björk's fifteenth nomination at the Grammys.

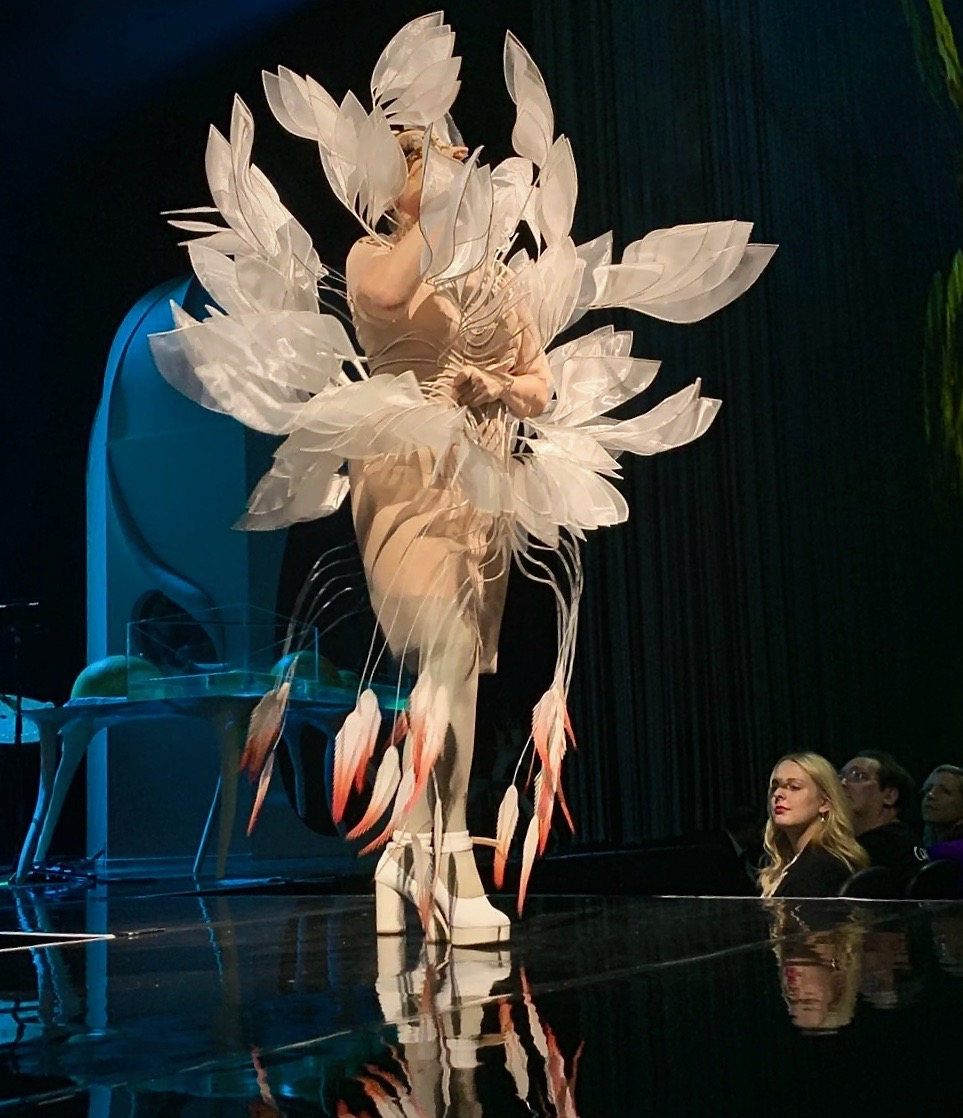
Björk performing at the Shed in 2019

On 22 May 2018, Björk appeared as the headlining musical guest on Later... with Jools Holland, her first time on the BBC series since 2011. She sang a set of four songs, including a flute rendition of "The Anchor Song" from 1993's Debut before embarking on the brief Utopia tour, playing in several European music festivals during the summer. On 12 November 2018, Björk announced a new concert production centered around her Utopia album, titled Cornucopia. Cornucopia opened in May 2019 at the newly built The Shed in New York and was described as Björk's "most elaborate staged concert to date." The residency show then traveled to Mexico and Europe for further dates in 2019. Following the performances, Björk released music videos for "Tabula Rasa" and "Losss", both directed by Tobias Gremmler and used as backdrop during the shows. On 16 August 2019, Björk announced the Utopia Bird Call Boxset, a box set meant to celebrate the end of the album cycle which 14 wooden flutes that imitate various bird calls and a USB stick featuring the digital albums, music videos and remixes, alongside an unreleased instrumental track, "Arpegggio". On 6 September 2019, two remixes of "Features Creatures" were released as digital singles, one by Fever Ray and the other by the Knife. Both remixes, as well as Björk's own remix of Fever Ray's 2017 song, "This Country", were collected on Country Creatures.

On 27 September 2019, Björk made a surprise appearance during Mutant;Faith, Arca's performance-art piece at the Shed, to debut "Afterwards", a new collaboration that Björk performed in a combination of Spanish and gibberish. The song is included on Arca's fourth studio album, Kick I, which was released on 26 June 2020. Björk then embarked on her eleventh concert tour, called Björk Orkestral, in which she performed orchestral arrangements of songs from her career. Due to the COVID-19 pandemic, the tour was postponed several times before taking place from 2021 to 2023.

In August 2020, Björk joined the cast of The Northman, the third feature film by Robert Eggers, co-written with Sjón, alongside her daughter Ísadóra Bjarkardóttir Barney, in her debut film role. It was released on 22 April 2022 in the United States.

In an interview with The Mercury News published on 19 January 2022, Björk mentioned that she was wrapping up work on her upcoming tenth studio album. She revealed in an interview with The Guardian, published on 19 August 2022, that the new album is called Fossora, a Latin word for "digging". Fossora was released on 30 September 2022. It was supported by four singles: "Atopos" on 6 September 2022, "Ovule" on 14 September, "Ancestress" on 22 September and the album's title track on 27 September. Also in September 2022 Björk ventured into podcasting, hosting Björk: Sonic Symbolism which, according to a press release, features her "discussing the textures, timbres and emotional landscapes of each of her albums" with friends writer Oddný Eir and musicologist Ásmundur Jónsson.

Björk released the single "Oral", featuring Rosalía with production from Sega Bodega, on 21 November 2023. A reworked demo written between Homogenic and Vespertine, the song is intended to support the inhabitants of Seyðisfjörður in the campaign against Norwegian-owned fish farming operations that threaten to degrade local ecosystems. The proceeds from this song were donated to Aegis, an environmental organization Björk founded with other Icelandic activists to stop the intensive fish farming that is destroying the fjords.

In 2024, Björk appeared on the April/May cover of Vogue Scandinavia, her first ever Vogue cover, photographed by Viðar Logi wearing Maison Margiela. In October, a newly discovered large butterfly species was named Pterourus bjorkae in honour of Björk. In 2025 Cornucopia, a concert film chronicling a performance in Lisbon during the last leg of the Cornucopia tour, directed by Ísold Uggadóttir, premiered on Apple TV+ as part of the Apple Music Live series, with a full-length version receiving a theatrical release. In 2025, Björk was featured on Rosalía's "Berghain" alongside Yves Tumor. For Björk, "Berghain" marked her second number-one single on the Spanish Singles Chart after "Hidden Place" in 2001.

== Artistry ==
=== Style ===
Over her solo career, Björk has developed an eclectic and avant-garde musical style that incorporates aspects of electronic, dance, alternative dance, trip hop, experimental, glitch, jazz, alternative rock, instrumental, and contemporary classical music. Her music has since been subject to critical analysis and scrutiny, as she consistently defies categorisation in a musical genre. Although she often calls herself a pop artist, she is considered a "restlessly experimental creative force". According to The New Yorker's Taylor Ho Bynum Her album Debut, which incorporated electronic, house, jazz, and trip hop, has been credited as one of the first albums to introduce electronic music into mainstream pop. Her work has been described as "frequently explor[ing] the relationship between nature and technology". Broadly summarising her wide-ranging integration of art and popular music, Joshua Ostroff suggested that "there is no better descriptor for what Björk does than artpop". The NME also called her output a "consistently progressive pop agenda."

Björk's work is idiosyncratically collaborative, having worked with various producers, photographers, fashion designers and music video directors. She however believes that her male collaborators have received more credit than her, which Björk attributes to her being a female artist.

=== Evolution ===
"Human Behaviour"
"Human Behaviour", the lead single from Debut (1993). An underground dance hit, it showcases Björk's interest in house music early in her solo career, evident in its four on the floor rhythm pattern.

During her career beginnings, Björk performed in bands from various musical genres: punk rock in Spit and Snot, jazz fusion in Exodus, post-punk in Tappi Tíkarrass and gothic rock in Kukl. When working with Tappi Tíkarrass, she was heavily influenced by British new wave bands such as Siouxsie and the Banshees, Wire, the Passions, the Slits, Joy Division, and Killing Joke. The studio album Gling-Gló (1990) was recorded with Tríó Guðmundar Ingólfssonar and featured jazz and popular standards sung "very much in the classic Ella Fitzgerald and Sarah Vaughan mould." The Sugarcubes' style has been described as avant-pop and alternative rock. Although Björk was in various post-punk and alternative rock bands during the late 1980s, her contact with London's underground club culture helped her find her own musical identity.

Debut, released in 1993, has been credited as one of the first albums to introduce electronic music into mainstream pop. Being a fan of dance music since the early days of acid house, Björk used dance music as the framework for her songs in Debut, stating in 1993 that it was the only "pop music that is truly modern" and "place where anything creative is happening today." However, in a Rolling Stone interview she also stated that she was more influenced by the sensual and groundbreaking ambient music formerly found in Chicago and Detroit. The music of Debut reflects the contemporary musical environment of London, where Björk lived in the early 1990s, especially the burgeoning trip-hop scene of bands like Portishead and Massive Attack. Michael Cragg of The Guardian has described it as an "indefinable conflation of electronic pop, trip-hop, world music and otherworldly lyrics"; while The Face's Mandi James said it was "a delightful fusion of thrash metal, jazz, funk and opera, with the odd dash of exotica thrown in for good measure."

The 1995 album Post, known for its eclecticism, is considered to be the "quintessential Björk" release, due to its protean form – more than any of her albums – and its "wide emotional palette". The entirety of the album was written after Björk's move to England, and intended to reflect the faster pace of her new urban life. The Guardian wrote that "Post tapped into the vortex of multicultural energy that was mid-90s London, where she had relocated and where strange hybrids such as jungle and trip-hop were bubbling." Post built on the dance-pop blueprint of Debut, but pushed its production and beats to the fore, with influences from all over the world. While the "distant echoes" of IDM and trip-hop were present in Debut, Post is characterised by Björk's fuller incorporation of these styles. Referred to as a "genre roulette" by the San Francisco Chronicle, it touches on various musical styles, including industrial music, big-band jazz, trip-hop, chillout, and experimental music. The balance between synthetic and organic elements in the album – generated through the combination of electronic and "real" instruments – is a recurring characteristic in Björk's output.

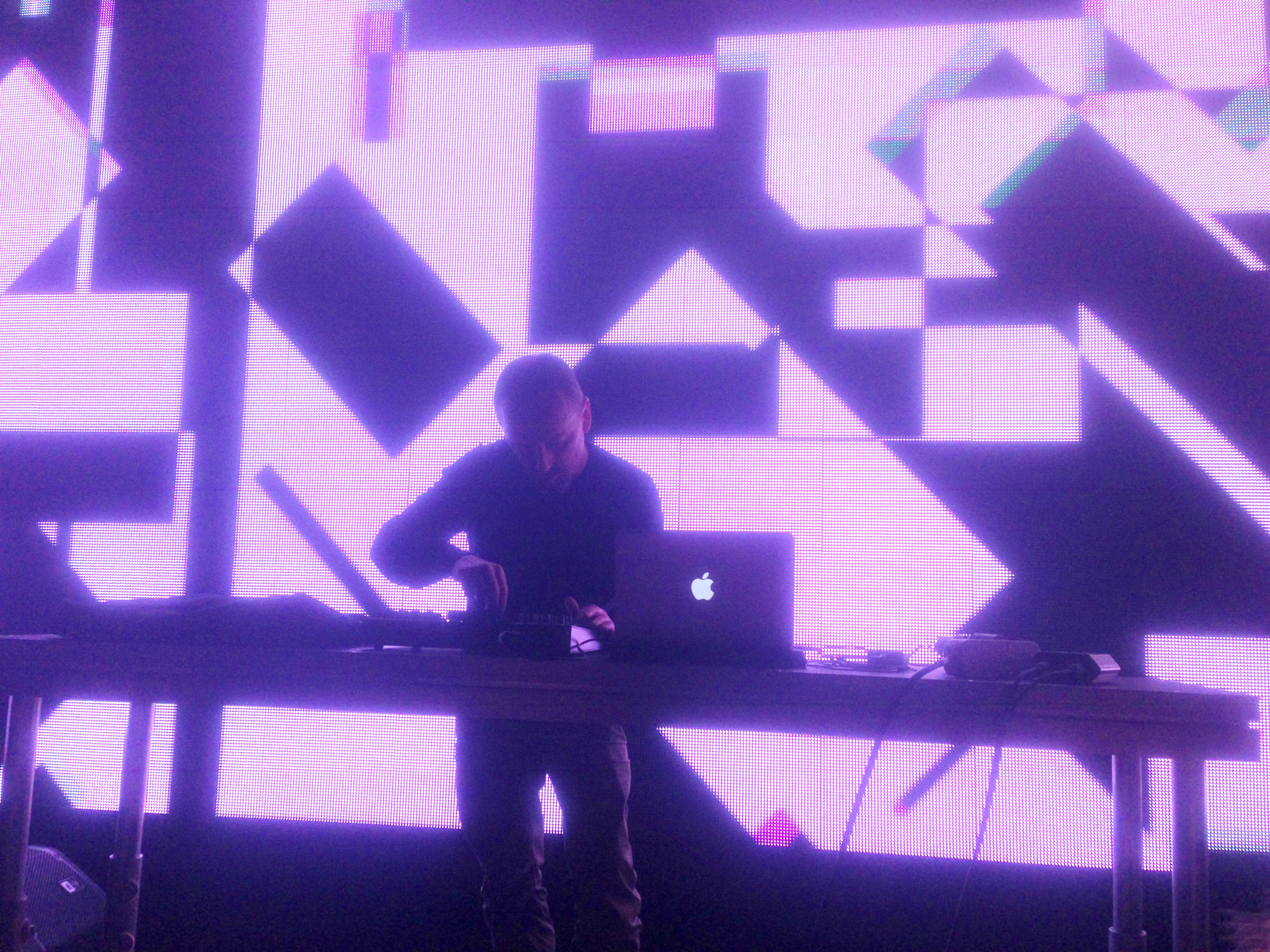
Mark Bell contributed to much of Björk's material, including his co-production of Homogenic, until his death in 2014.

With her 1997 album Homogenic, Björk intended to make a simple, one-flavoured record, in contrast with her previous releases. Conceptually focused on her native Iceland, the album is a "fusion of chilly strings (courtesy of the Icelandic String Octet), stuttering, abstract beats, and unique touches like accordion and glass harmonica". Björk incorporated a traditional singing method used by Icelandic choir men, a combination of speaking and singing as illustrated in the song "Unravel". While Homogenic still showed Björk's inclination towards electronic dance-music and techno-futurism, Neva Chonin of Rolling Stone reflected on how the album has steered away from the "sweet melodies and peppy dance collages of her earlier releases."

On the 2001 album Vespertine, Björk continued with her idiosyncratic general meshing of organic and synthetic textures, once again via the combination of electronic sounds and string arrangements. However, Vespertine differed from Homogenic in its greater interest in intimacy and sexuality (the result of her new relationship with artist Matthew Barney), with sharper melodies, minimalistic production and explicit lyrics inspired by poetry of E. E. Cummings and Sarah Kane's play Crave. Vespertine is also characterised by a newfound obsession with the auditory of analog technology, with a prevalent usage of loops, static and white noise, paradoxically contrasting the advancement of digital technology occurring in the 21st century; thus, elements of glitch music have been identified. Unlike previous albums like Debut and Post, electronic sounds has gained more prevalence, while the acoustic sounds are used as interjections. Björk also stepped away from her signature shrieking singing style; her vocals often appear to be recorded close to the microphone and with little treatment, and sung in a sometimes "unstable whisper", conveying a sense of close proximity and reduced space suitable for the lyrics that have grown to be more intimate.

Björk's 2004 studio album, Medúlla, is almost entirely constructed with human vocals, with a vast scope of influences ranging from elements of folk to medieval music. Wondering Sound wrote that despite "its comparative starkness, [Medúlla is] every bit as sensual as [Vespertine]," adding that the album's electronic effects vary from "industrial distortion to percussive glitches and dreamy layering, rarely descending into novelty." The album combines beatboxing, classical choirs that suggest composers like Penderecki or Arvo Pärt, and "mews, moans, counterpoint and guttural grunts" provided by Björk and guests like Mike Patton, Robert Wyatt and Tanya Tagaq. Medúlla includes "vocal fantasias" that lean toward chamber music, alongside tracks that "are obviously but distantly connected to hip-hop." Glimpses of Bulgarian women's choirs, the polyphony of central African pygmies, and the "primal vocalisms" of Meredith Monk were also noted.

Volta, released in 2007, received coverage after the inclusion of R&B producer Timbaland; however, NME wrote that "this is not Björk 'going hip-hop' or having a late-breaking pop reinvention." It has been said that the album achieves the perfect balance between her vibrant, poppier works in the '90s and her experiments in the 2000s. Björk wanted the album's beats to be "effortless, primitive, lo-fi style", in contrast with Vespertine. It combines a large brass ensemble with live and programmed drums and "ethnic instruments" like likembé, pipa and kora. Volta alternates between potent, joyful songs, and moodier, more contemplative tracks, "all of which are tied together by found-sound and brass-driven interludes that give the impression that the album was recorded in a harbor".

Biophilia, of 2011, showcases Björk's more avant-garde tendencies, drawing comparisons to Stockhausen and Nico's 1969 album, The Marble Index. The track "Moon" mesmerisingly encapsulates the comprehensive progress made across her previous works with metaphorical lyrics of natural phenomena and their impact on humans.

The music in Vulnicura, her 2015 album, is centered on Björk's voice, orchestral strings and electronic beats. This combination was already present in Homogenic, certainly the consequence of the common topics treated by both albums: "heartbreak and perseverance".

In 2017, Björk released Utopia, which harkened back to previous works such as Vespertine and Homogenic, combining organic and electronic elements. It has been referred to as Björk's flute album, akin to the heavy prevalence of Vespertine's celeste, Volta's brass, Medúlla's voices and Biophilia's choir. Arca and Björk closely collaborated in the album's production, and more consistently than her work with the late Mark Bell. The Venezuelan producer also takes a lead role in production.

In September 2022, Björk premiered the podcast Björk: Sonic Symbolism where she reviewed her sound experiences, accompanied by some of her collaborators in a conversation about the moods, timbers, and tempos through each of her ten albums.

=== Influences ===
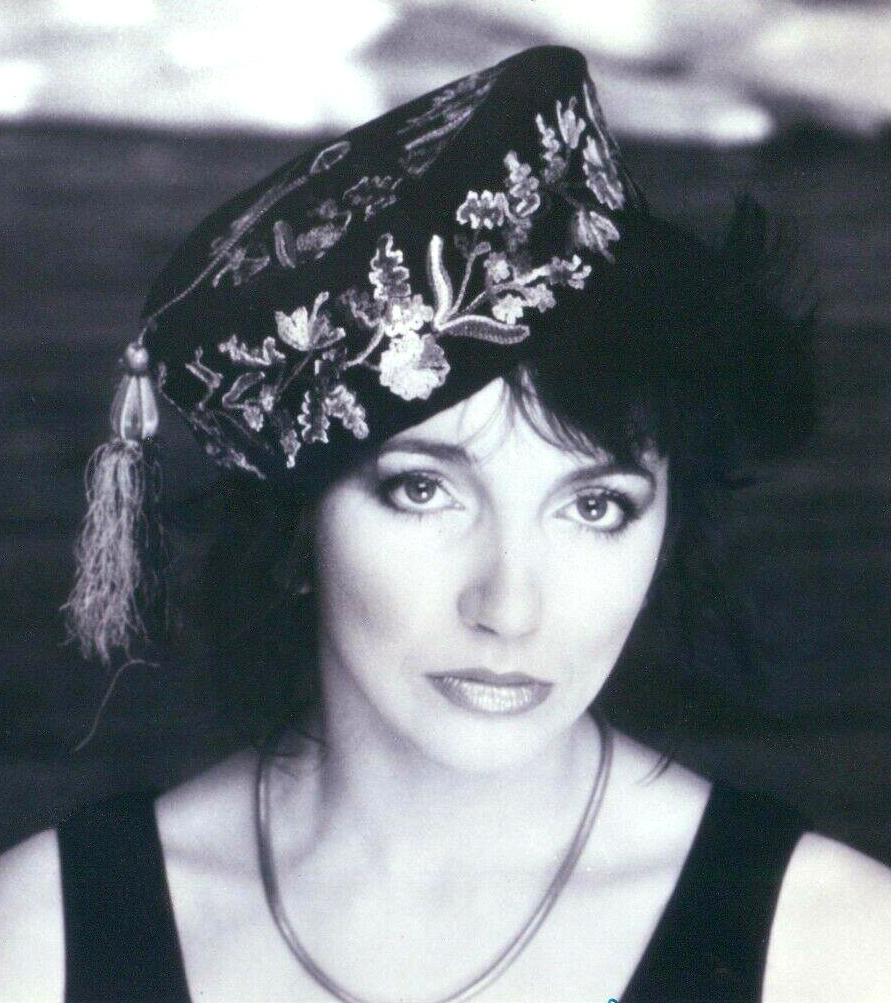
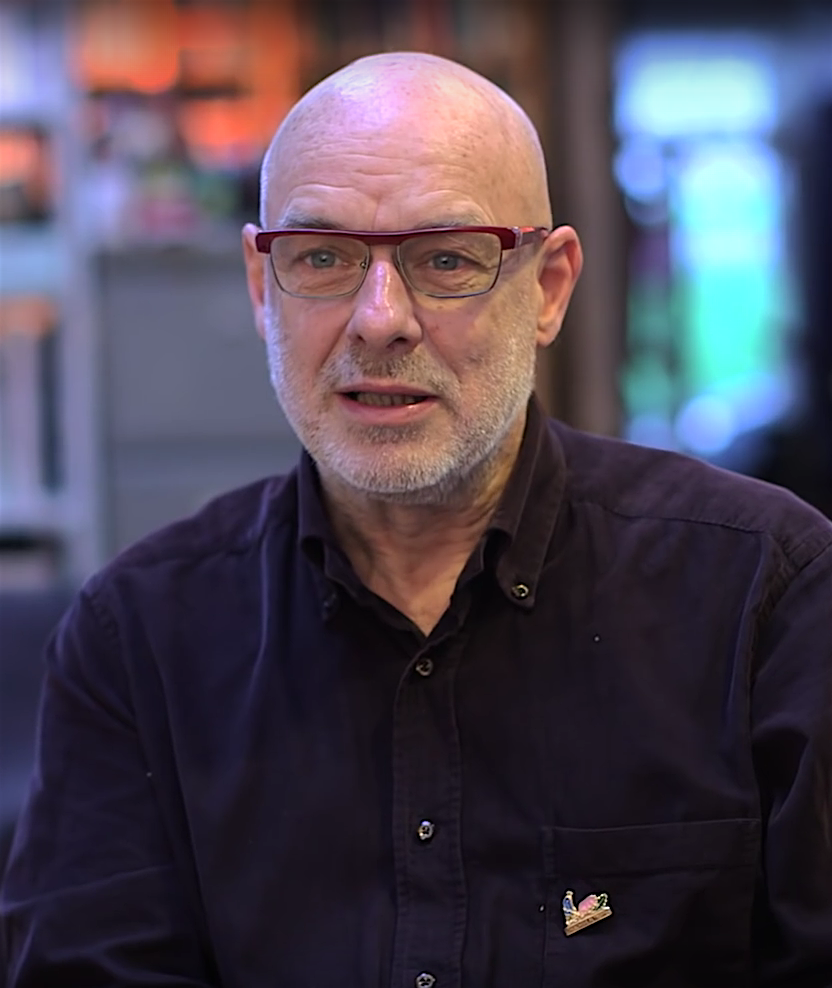
Kate Bush (left) and Brian Eno (right) have influenced Björk.

While Björk said that she was influenced by "everything", she has cited Stockhausen, Kraftwerk, Steve Reich, Brian Eno and Mark Bell as some of the people who influenced her the most. Some "confessional singer-songwriters" Björk commends include Abida Parveen, Chaka Khan, Joni Mitchell and Kate Bush, with the last of whom being a definitive influence in her career. Mitchell also inspired her to write her own songs, saying that Mitchell "created her own [female musical universe]", and found it "very liberating". According to Pulse: "a lot of Björk's early influences were books (Georges Bataille's Story of the Eye, Mikhail Bulgakov's The Master and Margarita) and films (Tampopo, Star Wars, The Tin Drum) available internationally. [...] But talk about Iceland and you're getting to the heart of the matter, the source of her spirited outlook on life."

During her formative years at music school, Björk became interested in avant-garde, classical, and minimalistic music; also becoming a "jazz freak". Although her music is more consistently tonal and has more crossover appeal, she is considered indebted to avant-garde composers Karlheinz Stockhausen, Meredith Monk, Sun Ra and Philip Glass. In a 2008 article for The Guardian, Björk considered Stockhausen as the root of electronic music, writing "he sparked off a sun that is still burning and will glow for a long time". Early in her career, Björk cited Sir David Attenborough as her biggest musical influence, saying "she identified with his thirst for exploring new and wild territories". In 1996, Björk showed her appreciation for expressionist composer Arnold Schoenberg, as she covered Pierrot Lunaire, originally from 1912. She also stated that she "[likes] to discover sounds I had never heard before".

=== Voice ===
Björk is a soprano, with a range spanning from E_{3} to D_{6}. Her singing voice has been described as both "elastic" and "somersaulting" in quality as well as being praised for her scatting ability, unique vocal stylings and delivery. In a review for her live performance at the 2011 Manchester International Festival, Bernadette McNulty of The Daily Telegraph commented, "the 45-year-old still uses electronic dance beats with a full-blooded raver's passion and the elemental timbre of her voice has grown more powerful with age".

In late 2012, it was reported that Björk had undergone surgery for a polyp on her vocal cords. Commenting on the success of the procedure after years of maintaining a strict diet and using vocal exercises to prevent vocal injury, she "stayed quiet for three weeks and then started singing and definitely feel like my cords are as good as pre-nodule". However, in a review for Biophilia, Kitty Empire of The Guardian stated that pre-surgery Björk still sounded strong, commenting that her voice was "spectacular and swooping", particularly on the song "Thunderbolt". In a similar vein, Matthew Cole of Slant Magazine adds that her voice has been "preserved quite well"; however also noting that her voice has become too hoarse and shouty, adding "it's only where her most dramatic vocal pyrotechnics are concerned that there's any question of physical ability".

== Legacy ==
Musicians from a wide array of genres have expressed admiration or cited Björk as an inspiration. These artists include: Solange Knowles, Danny Brown, Beyoncé, Eartheater, Perfume Genius, Travis Scott, SZA, Ellie Goulding, Michelle Zauner, Missy Elliott, Mike Shinoda of Linkin Park, Mitski, Christine and the Queens, AURORA, Kali Uchis, Kelela, Prince, Maggie Rogers, Amy Lee, Corinne Bailey Rae, Jeff Buckley, Hayley Williams of Paramore, Geddy Lee of Rush, Willow Smith, Raven-Symoné, Caroline Polachek, and Loreen.

NPR counted Björk among its list of "50 Great Voices" and MTV placed her at number 8 on its countdown of the "22 Greatest Voices in Music". She has been ranked 60th as one of the 100 greatest singers ever, and 81st as one of the 100 greatest songwriters ever by Rolling Stone, who praised her voice as being unique, fresh and extremely versatile, fitting and being influenced by a wide range of influences and genres.

== Personal life ==
When forming the Sugarcubes, Björk was briefly married to guitarist Þór Eldon. They had a son, Sindri Eldon Þórsson, born 8 June 1986, the same day that the band was formed. They had divorced before the end of 1986, but continued to work together in the band. Sindri has a child of his own, thereby making Björk a grandmother.

Following the breakup of the Sugarcubes, Björk moved to London, where she was immediately offered a record deal. She became engaged to London-based DJ Goldie, but broke up with him in 1996. She also had a brief relationship with musician Tricky in the 1990s. During this period, she became involved with the trip hop scene with which Goldie and Tricky were associated. Björk also began her work with fashion designer Alexander McQueen. As a result of her time spent in London, Björk developed a cockney accent, evident in her interviews given in English at the time.

In London, Björk grew tired of public life and the constant harassment from the paparazzi, in particular over a murder attempt by a stalker, Ricardo López, and her relationships with Tricky and Goldie. She moved to Spain after receiving an offer to stay there from Trevor Morais, her tour drummer, who had a residential studio at Marbella, Andalusia, where she produced Homogenic (1997).

In the late 1990s, Björk lived in New York, where she met artist Matthew Barney in the art scene. The pair formed a relationship and started living together, moving to Brooklyn Heights in 2000. Their daughter was born in 2002. Barney and Björk initially kept their work separate, but then collaborated on Barney's art film Drawing Restraint 9, a long-term project released in 2005; Björk acted in the film and also contributed musical elements. The couple broke up in 2013. At the time, she described the breakup as "the most painful thing" that she had ever experienced. The album Vulnicura, and in particular the track "Black Lake", were written about the breakup. Björk began to reside half of each year in the US and the other half in two residences in Iceland with her daughter.

Björk has been open about her bisexuality, stating in a 2004 interview with Diva that she has "always had as many powerful, creative ladies in my life as I have men, and you could probably describe some of those relationships as romantic. I think everyone's bisexual to some degree or another; it's just a question of whether you choose to recognise it and embrace it." In June 2026, the Icelandic musician Yara Polana confirmed she was in a relationship with Björk on Instagram.

=== Paparazzi confrontations ===
In February 1996, Björk arrived at Bangkok International Airport with her nine-year-old son after a long-haul flight. Reporters were present, despite Björk's early request that the press leave her and her son alone until a press conference. As Björk attempted to walk away from the paparazzi, television reporter Julie Kaufman approached the boy and said, "Welcome to Bangkok!" In response, Björk lunged at Kaufman, knocking her to the ground and tossing her until security intervened. Björk later apologised to Kaufman, who declined to press charges. Her record company later stated that Kaufman had been pestering Björk for four days before the incident.

On 13 January 2008, Björk attacked a photographer who had photographed her arrival at Auckland International Airport for her scheduled performance at the Big Day Out festival. Björk allegedly tore the photographer's shirt down the back, and in the process she fell to the ground. Neither the photographer nor his employer, The New Zealand Herald, lodged a formal complaint, and Auckland police did not investigate further.

=== Letter bomb attack attempt ===
On 12 September 1996, Ricardo López, an obsessed Uruguayan-American fan, mailed a letter bomb disguised as a book to Björk's London home, which was designed to spray sulphuric acid on her face to disfigure or kill her. He wanted to "punish" Björk for being in a relationship with Goldie. López then went back to his apartment, shaved his head, and painted his face and head red and green, and filmed his suicide in the final part of a video diary, which later became public after being released to journalists, causing a media sensation that temporarily halted the sessions in making Homogenic. The device failed to reach Björk because López’s body, and his plans, were discovered before the package was delivered, and the device was defused by Scotland Yard.

In her few public comments on this event, Björk said she was "very distressed" by the incident, and said, "I make music, but in other terms, you know, people shouldn't take me too literally and get involved in my personal life." She sent a card and flowers to López's family. She left for Spain, where she recorded the remainder of her third album, Homogenic, away from media attention. She also hired security for her son, Sindri, who was escorted to school with a minder. A year after López's death, Björk discussed the incident in an interview: "I was very upset that somebody had died. I couldn't sleep for a week. And I'd be lying if I said it didn't scare the fuck out of me that I could get hurt and, most of all, that my son could get hurt." López's video diary including footage of his suicide circulated across certain internet forums in the following years and he subsequently became known in the press as "Björk's stalker".

=== Sexual harassment allegations against Lars von Trier ===
In October 2017, in the wake of dozens of sexual abuse cases brought against film producer Harvey Weinstein, Björk posted on her Facebook page that she had been sexually harassed by a Danish film director. The Los Angeles Times found evidence identifying him as Lars von Trier. Von Trier has rejected Björk's allegation that he sexually harassed her during the making of the film Dancer in the Dark, and said "That was not the case. But that we were definitely not friends, that's a fact", to Danish daily Jyllands-Posten in its online edition. Peter Aalbæk Jensen, the producer of Dancer in the Dark, told Jyllands-Posten that "as far as I remember we [Lars von Trier and I] were the victims. That woman was stronger than both Lars von Trier and me and our company put together. She dictated everything and was about to close a movie of 100m kroner [$16m]".

After von Trier's statement, Björk detailed her allegations on her Facebook page such as "wrap[ping] his arms around [her] for a long time in front of all crew or alone and stroked [her] sometimes for minutes against [her] wishes." Once she began asking him to stop, "he exploded and broke a chair in front of everyone on set." She also said that he whispered graphic sexual comments and threatened to climb to her room from his balcony, so she moved to a friend's room to escape. She lastly claimed that von Trier "fabricated stories in the press about [her] being difficult by his producer."

Björk's manager, Derek Birkett, has spoken in support of her representation of von Trier's actions, saying that this "[was] the one and only time she has fallen out with a collaborator."

The Guardian later found that Jensen's studio, Zentropa, with which von Trier frequently collaborated, had an endemic culture of sexual harassment. Jensen stepped down from CEO position of Zentropa as further harassment allegations came to light in 2017.

== Other ventures ==
=== Charitable work ===
After the tsunami that struck Southeast Asia in late 2004, Björk began work on a new project titled Army of Me: Remixes and Covers to help raise money for a relief fund. This project recruited fans and musicians from around the world to either cover or remix the 1995 track "Army of Me". From over 600 responses, Björk and her co-writer Graham Massey picked the best 20 versions to appear on the album. The album was released in April in the UK and in late May 2005 in the US. By January 2006, the album had raised about £250,000 to help UNICEF's work in the southeast Asian region. Björk visited Banda Aceh in February 2006 to view some of UNICEF's work with the children who were affected by the tsunami.

On 2 July 2005, Björk took part in the Live 8 series of concerts, headlining the Japan show with Do As Infinity, Good Charlotte and McFly. She performed eight songs with Matmos, a Japanese string octet, and Zeena Parkins.

=== Political activity ===
Björk's years in Kukl aligned her with the anarchist Crass Collective.

==== Independence movements ====
She dedicated her song "Declare Independence" to Greenland and the Faroe Islands, which caused a minor controversy in the Faroes. After Björk twice dedicated "Declare Independence" to the people of Kosovo during a concert in Japan, her upcoming performance at Serbia's Exit Festival was cancelled, reportedly for safety concerns.

In 2008, Björk dedicated "Declare Independence" to the International Tibet Independence Movement in a Shanghai concert, chanting "Tibet! Tibet!" during the song, which led China's Ministry of Culture to issue a ban on her from performing in the country. In 2014, Björk posted on social media dedicating the song in support of the Yes vote in Scotland's referendum on their independence. In October 2017, she posted on social media dedicating the song to Catalonia on the occasion of the Catalan independence referendum.

In January 2026, following proposals by United States President Donald Trump for the United States to annex Greenland, Björk called for Greenland's independence, stating: "the chance that my fellow greenlanders [sic] might go from one cruel coloniser to another is too brutal to even imagine."

==== Palestine ====
In November 2023, during the Gaza war, in which Israel has been accused of committing genocide against Palestinians, she posted to her social media accounts criticising the Israeli occupation of Palestine. In September 2025, Björk joined the "No Music for Genocide" boycott to geo-block her music from music streaming platforms in Israel in protest of the Gaza genocide.

In October 2025, Björk used her social media platforms to condemn Israel's seizure of a humanitarian flotilla and to demand the "safe return" of her friend, Icelandic musician Magga Stína, who she stated was kidnapped from the vessel Conscience in international waters. Arguing that blocking food from civilians is illegal, she urged Iceland to pressure Israel and suspend business ties.

Using social media in December 2025, Björk called for the Icelandic broadcaster RÚV to pull Iceland out of the Eurovision Song Contest 2026 to join Ireland, the Netherlands, Slovenia and Spain in a boycott of contest after the European Broadcasting Union (EBU)'s general assembly voted to allow Israel to continue competing. On 10 December 2025, RÚV decided that Iceland would withdraw from the contest.

==== Environmental activism in Iceland ====
Björk has also taken an interest in environmental issues in Iceland. In 2004, she took part in the Hætta concert in Reykjavík, organised in protest against the building of Alcoa aluminium smelters in the country, which would make Iceland the biggest smelter in Europe. She founded the organisation Náttúra, which aims to promote Icelandic nature and grassroots industries. In October 2008, Björk wrote an article for The Times about the Icelandic economy and provided her opinion on the proposed use of natural resources to rescue the country from debt. In collaboration with Auður Capital, she set up a venture capital fund titled BJÖRK to support the creation of sustainable industries in Iceland.

In 2008, Björk wrote the foreword to the English translation of Andri Snær Magnason's bestseller book titled Dreamland – A Self Help Manual For A Frightened Nation. On 21 May 2010, Björk wrote an open letter in The Reykjavík Grapevine calling on the Icelandic government to "do everything in its power to revoke the contracts with Magma Energy", the Canadian company that owns Icelandic geothermal company HS Orka.

In 2014, Björk helped to organise Stopp, Let's Protect the Park, an event organised to raise money and awareness for the preservation of Icelandic nature. This included a show at Harpa Concert Hall, at which she performed three songs. The concert initially raised $310,000 and went on to raise £3 million overall, with plans to use the money to establish a national park.

In 2022, Björk stated her reasoning for going back to Iceland was because of gun violence in the United States.

=== Protégés ===
Over her extensive career, Björk has frequently used her position and influence to help launch new acts or mentor them as they establish themselves as recording artists.

The first example was the Iranian-born electronica producer Leila Arab, who was initially recruited to play keyboards and provide backing vocals on Björk's first international solo tour in 1993 in support of Debut. In 1995, Björk recalled Arab for her second touring band for tour in support of Post. This time, Arab was given her first opportunity to experiment with live output mixing from the stage rather than playing keyboards. This would later form the basis of Arab's own solo music career, in which she has integrated live mixing into her own compositions and live shows. Arab went on to release three international solo albums throughout the 1990s and appears on the influential electronica labels Rephlex Records, XL Recordings and Warp Records.

In 1998, Björk established her own short-lived record label, Ear Records, which operated under the One Little Indian Records umbrella. Her only signee that received a release was her longtime friend Magga Stína, who recorded her debut solo album under the production of Björk's longtime collaborator Graham Massey (of the British electronica act 808 State). The album was simply titled An Album and featured just one single release, "Naturally". In 1998, Björk invited Magga to perform as her support act on the Homogenic tour.

In 2001, Björk invited Canadian Inuk throat singer Tanya Tagaq to perform on several dates of Björk's Vespertine world tour as a special guest. In 2004, Tagaq was invited to collaborate on the a cappella album Medúlla, in which the duet "Ancestors" was recorded. "Ancestors" was later featured on Tagaq's first solo album, Sinaa, in 2005.

In 2004, Arab discovered the work of Finnish multimedia artist Heidi Kilpeläinen, who had taken her combination of lo-fi, homemade electro pop with her own self-produced music videos and combined them under the alter ego character HK119. Leila soon referred HK119's work to Björk, who started mentioning HK119 in various press and interviews. In 2004, Arab announced HK119 as her favourite act of 2004. HK119 was soon signed to Björk's parent label One Little Indian Records, which released her debut album in 2006. HK119 and Björk appeared in a joint interview in Dazed & Confused magazine in 2006, in which Björk stated about HK119's work: "It's unique. Even if I gave you $3 million, you couldn't improve on it ... [Its] simplicity is [its] strength."

In 2009, Björk helped promote fellow Icelandic musician Ólöf Arnalds, who is also a member of the Icelandic folktronica band múm. Björk mentioned Arnalds among her favourite recent new acts during a radio interview, and encouraged One Little Indian Records to reissue their album in the UK and Europe in 2009. Björk also praised the works of English artist Micachu and Syrian vocalist Omar Souleyman. She later used her website to host the premiere of Micachu's debut video for Rough Trade Records, "Turn Me Well".

== Discography ==
- Debut (1993)
- Post (1995)
- Homogenic (1997)
- Vespertine (2001)
- Medúlla (2004)
- Volta (2007)
- Biophilia (2011)
- Vulnicura (2015)
- Utopia (2017)
- Fossora (2022)

== Filmography ==
- Broken Glass (1988)
- The Juniper Tree (1990)
- Dancer in the Dark (2000)
- Drawing Restraint 9 (2005)
- The Northman (2022)

== Tours ==
- Debut tour (1993–1994)
- Post tour (1995–1997)
- Homogenic tour (1997–1999)
- Vespertine world tour (2001)
- Greatest Hits tour (2003)
- The Volta tour (2007–2008)
- Biophilia tour (2011–2013)
- Vulnicura tour (2015–2017)
- Utopia tour (2018)
- Cornucopia (2019–2023)
- Björk Orkestral (2021–2023)

== Bibliography ==
- Um Úrnat frá Björk (1984)
- Post (1995)
- Björk/Björk as a book (2001)
- Live Book (2003)
- Biophilia – Manual Edition (2011)
- Biophilia Live (2012)
- Björk: Archives (2015)
- 34 Scores for Piano, Organ, Harpsichord and Celeste (2017)
- Cornucopia: The Book (2024)

== Awards and nominations ==
On 26 April 1997, Björk received the award of the Order of the Falcon.

=== Memberships ===
Björk is a foreign member of the Royal Swedish Academy of Music.

== See also ==
- Björk Guðmundsdóttir & tríó Guðmundar Ingólfssonar
- Kraumur – a music fund of which Björk is an advisory board member
- List of artists who reached number one on the U.S. dance chart
- List of atheists in music
- List of Nordic Academy Award winners and nominees
- List of number-one dance hits (United States)
- List of trip hop artists
- Mononymous person
- Music of Iceland
- Vegvísir – Björk's tattoo, located on her left arm
- List of Icelandic writers
