= Oddný Eir =

Icelandic writer (born 1972)

- Oddný Eir Ævarsdóttir
- Born: 1972 (age 53–54)
- Education: Sorbonne University
- Writing career
- Genre: novels
- Notable awards: Icelandic Literary Award

Oddný Eir Ævarsdóttir (born 1972) is an Icelandic writer. She has written three autobiographical novels, her best-known work being Jarðnæði (Land of love; plan of ruins) which was nominated for the Icelandic Literary Award in 2011 and which won the 2012 Icelandic Women's Literature Prize and the 2014 EU Prize for Literature.

== Life ==
Oddny Eir has a PhD from Sorbonne University. She runs a publishing company Apaflasa in collaboration with her brother the archaeologist Uggi Ævarsson.

== Works ==
- Ways in between : Gudbjörg Lind, Gudrun Kristjansdottir, Kristin Jonsdottir = Leidin a milli, Reykjavik : Þjóðminjasafns Íslands, 2007, OCLC 488422859
- Land of love and ruins, Brooklyn, NY : Restless Books, 2016. ISBN 9781632060723, OCLC 972330336
