= Gramm (record label) =

Icelandic record label

Gramm Records

Gramm was an Icelandic record label created by Ásmundur Jónsson and Einar Örn Benediktsson in 1981.

Located in Reykjavík, Gramm’s first release was a 10-track 7" vinyl titled Tilf by Purrkur Pillnikk, a punk group led by Einar Örn.

Besides releasing all Purrkur Pillnikk's records, Gramm also issued works of artists like the English experimental group Psychic TV, Björk's first band Tappi Tíkarrass and Kukl (featuring Björk and Einar Örn). Rock band Þeyr and punk groups such as Vonbrigði were also associated with Gramm.

In 1987, Gramm went bankrupt. Ásmundur and some of the musicians who were playing in Kukl created Smekkleysa, which ultimately became Bad Taste, known worldwide by the Sugarcubes.

== Discography ==
This is the discography of the defunct Icelandic record label Gramm.

Year	Catalogue number	Title	Artist
1981	Gramm 1	Tilf	Purrkur Pillnikk
1982	Gramm 2	Music Concrete	The Dirty Dan Project
1981	Gramm 3	Ekki Enn	Purrkur Pillnikk
1982	Gramm 4	Eddukvæði	Sveinbjörn Beinteinsson
198?	Kramm 5	Pakk	Pakk
1982	Gramm 6	Googooplex	Purrkur Pillnikk
1982	Gramm 7	Svonatorrek	Jonee Jonee
1982	Gramm 8	Líf	Stanya
1982	Gramm 9	No Time to Think	Purrkur Pillnikk
1983	Gramm 10	Maskínan	Purrkur Pillnikk
1983	Gramm 11	Skítseiði	Vonbrigði
1983	Gramm 12	Q1	Q4U
1983	Kramm 13	Listur með Orma	Svarthvítur draumur
1983	Gramm 14	Kakofonía	Vonbrigði
1983	Gramm 15	The Boys from Chicago	Þorlákur Kristinnsson/Íkarus
1983	Gramm 16	Miranda	Tappi Tíkarrass
1983	Gramm 17	Söngull	Kukl
1984	Gramm 18	Rás 5-20	Íkarus
1984	Gramm 19	Djöfuls ég	P.P.
1984	Gramm 20	Lili Marlene	Das Kapital
1984	Gramm 21	Möndlur	Hrím
1984	Gramm 22	Hringurinn	Lárus Grímsson
1984	Gramm 23	Those Who Do Not	Psychic TV
1986	Gramm/Kabell 24	Human Rights	Leo Smith
1985	Gramm 25	Kona	Bubbi Morthens
1986	Gramm 26	LFellibylurinn Gloría	Various Artists
1986	Gramm 27	Lystisnekkjan Gloría	Various Artists
1987	Gramm 28	No Pain	Ornamental
1986	Gramm 29	Blús fyrir Rikka	Bubbi Morthens
1987	Gramm 30	Frelsi til sölu	Bubbi Morthens
1987	Gramm 31	Skytturnar	Miscellaneous*
1987	Gramm 32	Skapar Fegurðin Hamingju?	Bubbi Morthens & MX-21
1987	Gramm 33	???	???
1987	Gramm 34	Loftmynd	Megas
1987	Gramm CD35	Dögun	Bubbi Morthens
1988	Gramm 36	Höfuðlausnir	Megas
1988	Gramm 37	???	???
1988	Gramm 38	56	Bubbi Morthens
1988	Gramm 39? / Erðanúmúsik E-17	Bless	S.H. Draumur
1988	Gramm 40	Bláir draumar	Bubbi Morthens & Megas
198?	Gramm ??	Blar Azzure	Jonee Jonee
1982	GM 2	Lunaire	Þeyr
1982	G 100	Clarinet Concerto	Áskell Másson
1988	GCD 101	Trio for clarinet, violin & viola	Áskell Másson
1986	Gramm 26	Fellibylurinn Gloría	Gyrðir Elíasson

(*): Skytturnar was the soundtrack to the film directed by Friðrik Þór Friðriksson. It featured The Sugarcubes, Bubbi Morthens, and Megas, among many others. For more information about the movie, please see Skytturnar (film).

== See also ==
- List of record labels
