= Tappi Tíkarrass =

Punk band

- Tappi Tíkarrass on stage (1982)

Background information
- Origin: Reykjavík, Iceland
- Genres: Punk rock; post-punk; punk jazz
- Years active: 1981–1983; 2015–present
- Labels: Gramm; Spor
- Members: Jakob Smári Magnússon; Eyjólfur Jóhannsson; Eyþór Arnalds; Guðmundur Þór Gunnarsson
- Past members: Björk Guðmundsdóttir; Oddur F. Sigurbjörnsson

Tappi Tíkarrass is an Icelandic punk band which added elements of funk, rock and jazz to their music, marking a difference from other traditional bands at that time. The band is also considered the first serious music project of now renowned singer Björk Guðmundsdóttir. The band was reformed in 2015 by the original members, without Björk.

== Origins ==
In 1979, Björk was singing in a band called Exodus with guitarists Ásgeir Sæmundsson and Þorvaldur Bjarni Þorvaldsson, bassist Skúli Sverrisson, and drummer Oddur F. Sigurbjörnsson. In 1980 she left the band with Oddur and joined bassist Jakob Smári Magnússon and guitarist Eyjólfur Jóhannsson to form a band called Jam-80 because they were meant to play for just one gig, although they continued playing for a while.

They performed a mixture of pop and punk music and never released any official record, but recorded a cassette demo during a gig at Hólabrekkuskóli which contained the following tracks: two songs by Janis Ian: "Run too Fast, Fly too High" and "The Other Side of the Sun"; two songs by Deep Purple: "Highball Shooter" and "Demon's Eye"; other tracks were "13–16" by Utangarðsmenn, Jethro Tull's arrangement of J.S. Bach's Bourrée, "Funky Town", and two instrumental songs (untitled). This band came to an end when decided to create a punk band with more serious music. That is how Tappi Tíkarrass came into being by September 1981 with vocalist Eyþór Arnalds, who was replaced a few months later by Björk and a year later, Oddur was replaced in drums by Guðmundur Þór Gunnarsson.

The name Tappi Tíkarrass, which in Icelandic means "Cork the Bitch's Ass" was given after Jakob's father claimed that the band's music "fitted like a cork in a bitch's ass". Tappi Tíkarrass combined elements of punk and pop music to create an exotic post punk with references to Siouxsie and the Banshees and the first stage of the Cure.

Björk has performed with the band dressed in porcelain doll attire.

== Releases ==
They started to record in August 1982 and released an EP titled Bitið fast í vitið which went out through label Spor. This 12" vinyl was formed of 5 tracks performed by Björk, who replaced the original vocals by Eyþór. The only song in English was "London".

They followed up in 1983 with the full-length Miranda, released by Gramm.

After reforming without Björk, the group released a self-titled full-length in December 2017, on their own self-titled label.

== Featuring and appearances on film ==
Tappi Tíkarrass appeared on Rokk í Reykjavík, a TV documentary directed by Friðrik Þór Friðriksson. Tappi Tíkarrass was one of the 19 bands featured in the film and collaborated with two songs: "Hrollur" and "Dúkkulísur", both of them sung by Björk and Eyþór with Oddur replacing Guðmundur in drums. Björk became the film's visual symbol and its cover star. The movie is considered classic in Iceland and corresponding period in Icelandic music is now known as the ‘Rokk í Reykjavík’-era.

In 1983 they appeared on Nýtt Líf, a comedy directed by Þráinn Bertelsson. The film was shot in the Westman Islands and Tappi Tíkarrass played on stage two songs "Sperglar" and "Kukl" (better known as "Seiður"), under the supervision of Megas.

Despite the rising interest in this band as Björk developed into an international music artist, the discography of Tappi Tíkarrass has never been reissued and all the original releases are widely unavailable. The band has appeared only in two Icelandic compilations, Satt 3 which was released in 1984 and featured two live B-sides: "Sperglar" and "Seiður". Finally, by 1998 record label Spor released Nælur, another compilation which contained the songs "Iltí Ební" and "London", both of them taken from Bitið fast í vitið.

== Tappi Tíkarrass split up and the fate of its members ==
By July 1983 the band split up when Björk joined Purrkur Pillnikk's singer Einar Örn Benediktsson, Þeyr's guitarist Guðlaugur Kristinn Óttarsson and drummer Sigtryggur Baldursson, with Medúsa's keyboardist Einar Arnaldur Melax, and finally Birgir Mogensen bassist from Spilafífl. Together they formed a goth-oriented and more experimental band called Kukl.

Jakob Magnússon and Guðmundur joined Bubbi Morthens to play in Das Kapital until 1985, then Jakob followed up with Bubbi & MX-21, and worked as a session player for several artists. In 2003 he released his first solo album, Bassajól. After playing in Das Kapital, Guðmundur withdrew from the music scene.

After leaving the band, Eyþór Arnalds studied cello and continued with the band Todmobile and later joined singer Móa Julíusdóttir to form a band called Bong which achieved relative success in Iceland and England. He has released a few solo albums and then collaborated with Móa's debut album Universal in 1998 and has worked in the Icelandic music industry as sound engineer. More recently, he got involved in politics, getting elected as mayor in the town of Árborg. Eyjólfur Jóhannsson continued playing with bands like Dá, The Wunderfoolzs, and in 2002 joined S.S.Sól. Oddur joined a heavy metal band called Foringjarnir, and he became an electrician. More recently he followed up with another band called Santiago, releasing an album in 2002.

The last performance of Tappi Tíkarrass took place in 1987 when the band reunited to play at a night club called Safari.

== Performances ==
Tappi Tíkarrass had numerous gigs throughout Iceland when originally formed, and visited UK in spring 1983 (below are listed some of the known performances). After a 30-year hiatus, the band performed (without Björk) at Secret Solstice 2017 in Iceland, and then later the same year at Iceland Airwaves 2017.

Date	Place – Tour/Concert	Other bands
???, 1982	Ársel Community Centre	–
July 2, 1982	Félagsstofnun Stúdenta	Vonbrigði, Purrkur Pillnikk and Sjálfsfróun.
July 22, 1982	Hótel Borg	Purrkur Pillnikk and Sjálfsfróun.
August 28, 1982	is:Melarokk, is:Melavöllurinn, Reykjavík	Reflex, KOS, Grýlurnar, Hin konunglega flugeldarokksveit, Stockfield Big Nose Band, Q4U, Vonbrigði, Fræbbblarnir, Þrumuvagninn, Pungó og Daisy, Lola, Bandóðir, BARA-flokkurinn and Purrkur Pillnikk
November 17, 1983	Tónabær	Featured group at Músíktilraunir, an annual band contest in Reykjavík.
???, 1987	Safari	–

== Discography ==
EP:

- 1982 – Bitið fast í vitið (Spor)

Album:

- 1983 – Miranda (Gramm)
- 2017 – Tappi Tíkarrass (Tappi Tíkarrass)

Featuring:

- 1982 – Rokk í Reykjavík (Hugrenningur), soundtrack to the documentary directed by Friðrik Þór Friðriksson.
- 1984 – Satt 3 (Satt), Icelandic compilation.
- 1998 – Nælur (Spor), Icelandic compilation.

Films:

- 1982 – Rokk í Reykjavík (Íslenska kvikmyndasamsteypan), documentary directed by F. Þ. Friðriksson.
- 1983 – Nýtt Líf (Nýtt Líf ehf.), film directed by Þráinn Bertelsson.
- 2003 – Inside Björk (One Little Indian), a retrospective documentary of singer Björk.

== See also ==
- Music of Iceland

== Related bibliography ==
- Rokksaga Íslands, by Gestur Guðmundsson. Forlagið (1990).
- Björk, Colección Imágenes de Rock, N°82, by Jordi Bianciotto. Editorial La Máscara (1997).
- Alternative Rock : Third Ear – The Essential Listening Companion, by Dave Thimpson. Backbeat Books (2000).
- Lobster or Fame, by Ólafur Jóhann Engilbertsson. Bad Taste (2000).
