= Jesus Christ Bobby =

Studio album by Mínus
- Released: 10 July 2001
- Recorded: October 2000
- Genre: Post-hardcore, noise rock
- Length: 44:06
- Label: Smekkleysa
- Producer: Ken Thomas, Curver and Mínus

Mínus chronology
Hey Johnny! (1999)	Jesus Christ Bobby (2001)	Halldór Laxness (2003)

Professional ratings
Review scores
Source	Rating
Kerrang	5/5 stars
Allmusic	3/5 stars

Jesus Christ Bobby is an album by the Icelandic band Mínus. It was recorded and produced in October 2000 by Curver in Studio Rusl and at Frosti's bedroom. Mixed by Ken Thomas at Thule Studios. This marked the last album written by the band playing a Noise Rock/Hardcore influenced sound, before changing style drastically for follow-up album Halldor Laxness.

== Track listing ==
All songs written and performed by Mínus and a noisy help from Curver. Special guest vocals on "Modern Haircuts" by Einar Örn. "Bonus Track" is every song on the album played in reverse at the same time. "Arctic Exhibition" is the only track whose lyrics cannot be found in the cd booklet.

1. "Chimera" - 2:24
2. "Leisure" - 2:24
3. "Modern Haircuts" - 3:39
4. "Misdo" - 3:22
5. "Electra Complex" - 2:52
6. "Frat Rock" - 4:50
7. "Arctic Exhibition" - 3:52
8. "Liquid Courage" - 4:01
9. "Denver" - 3:08
10. "Peccadillo" - 2:54
11. "Pulse" 5:20
12. "Bonus Track" - 5:20

== Personnel ==
- Krummi - Vocals
- Frosti - Guitar
- Bjarni - Guitar
- Bjössi - Drums
- Ívar - Bass
