= La valse (disambiguation) =

La valse, French for the waltz, is an orchestral composition by Maurice Ravel.

La valse may also refer to:

== Ballets ==
- La valse, a ballet choreographed by Frederick Ashton
- La Valse, a ballet choreographed by George Balanchine

== Music ==
- La valse, an EP by Nicholas Craven
- "La valse", a song from Mlah, an album by Les Négresses Vertes

== Other uses ==
- La valse, the original French title of The Waltz, a sculpture by Camille Claudel

== See also ==
- Valse
- Waltz
