= Bitið fast í vitið =

EP by Tappi Tíkarrass
- Released: Late-1982
- Recorded: August 1982
- Genre: Punk rock
- Length: 12:52
- Language: Icelandic, British English
- Label: Spor (catalogue number: SPOR 4)
- Producer: Tappi Tíkarrass; Tony Cook

Tappi Tíkarrass chronology
Bitið fast í vitið (1982)	Miranda (1983)

Bitið fast í vitið (roughly "Bite Hard In Your Mind" in Icelandic) is the début EP of Icelander punk/pop group Tappi Tíkarrass. It was released in late-1982 on the Spor label. This was the band's most punk-oriented release and contains five tracks, featuring one in English, "London".

== Track listing ==
=== Side 1 ===
1. "Ottar" – 2:33
2. "Lok-Lað" – 2:12
3. "Iltí Ební" – 2:20

=== Side 2 ===
1. "London" – 2:14
2. "Fa-Fa" – 3:33

== Personnel ==
- Björk Guðmundsdóttir – lead vocals, keyboards
- Jakob Smári Magnússon – bass
- Eyjólfur Jóhannsson – guitar
- Guðmundur Þór Gunnarsson – drums
- Eyþór Arnalds – vocals on "Fa-Fa"
- Tappi Tíkarrass – composition, lyrics

Additional personnel

- Recording engineer: Tony Cook
- Album: Dóra Einarsdóttir
- Photography: Friðþjófur Helgasson
