= Holidays in Europe (The Naughty Nought) =

1986 studio album by Kukl

Studio album by Kukl
- Released: January 24, 1986
- Recorded: October 1984 – October 1985
- Studio: Southern Studios
- Genre: Post-punk; no wave; avant-garde
- Length: 34:55
- Label: Crass Records; One Little Indian
- Producer: Penny Lapsang Rimbaud

Kukl chronology
Kukl á Paris 14.9.84 (1984)	Holidays in Europe (The Naughty Nought) (1986)

Professional ratings
Review scores
Source	Rating
AllMusic	2.5/5 stars

Holidays in Europe (The Naughty Nought) is the second and last studio album by the Icelandic post-punk group Kukl, released on January 24, 1986, by Crass Records.

The album has been reissued numerous times: in 1997 by Crass Records, and in 2002, 2004 and 2008 by One Little Indian Records.

== Production ==
The album was recorded at Southern Studios in London between October 1984 and October 1985 and was produced by Penny Rimbaud of Crass and engineered by Mel Jefferson. The album was more complex in comparison to its predecessor The Eye, with greater use of electronic noise and distorted samples and keyboards.

== Track listing ==
Side A
No.	Title	Length
1.	"Outward Flight (Psalm 323)"	3:49
2.	"France (A Mutual Thrill)"	4:19
3.	"Gibraltar (Copy Thy Neighbour)"	4:55
4.	"Greece (Just by the Book)"	6:58

Side B
No.	Title	Length
5.	"England (Zro)"	4:51
6.	"Holland (Latent)"	4:40
7.	"Aegean (Vials of Wrath)"	4:29
8.	"The Homecoming (The Night)"	2:54

== Personnel ==
Credits adapted from the album's liner notes.

Kukl

- Björk (credited as "Bjørk") – vocals
- Einar Örn Benediktsson (credited as "Einar Ørn") – vocals, trumpet
- Einar Arnaldur Melax (credited as "Melax") – synthesizer, piano
- Guðlaugur Kristinn Óttarsson (credited as "Gud Krist") – electric strings
- Birgir Mogensen (credited as "Birgir") – bass
- Sigtryggur Baldursson (credited as "Sigtryggur") – drums

Additional personnel

- Penny Rimbaud – production
- Mel Jefferson – engineering
- Jamil Sairah – additional vocals (track 5)
- Sjón (Sigurjón Birgir Sigurðsson) – participated in the booklet design, but the early work was subsequently replaced by Einar Ørn and Crass.
