= Lucrate Milk =

French art punk and No Wave band from Paris, France

- Lucrate Milk, 1983

Background information
- Origin: Paris, France
- Genres: Post-punk, No Wave; Punk
- Years active: 1979 – 1984,
- Labels: Atypeek Music, V.I.S.A., Bondage Records, Archives de la zone Mondiale
- Members: Nina Childress (vocals, keyboards); Raoul Gaboni (drums); Lombrick Laul (bass); Masto Lowcost (saxophone)
- Past members: Helno (vocals, 25 December 1963 - 22 January 1993)
- Website: official site

Lucrate Milk (short for Lucrative Milk) were a French art punk and No Wave band from Paris, France. The band lasted from 1979 to 1983. The group has retained a certain aura to this day in France's punk circles due to their complete lack of compromise and influence on the French DIY scene. Sometime after the disband of Lucrate Milk, some of the former members formed the band Bérurier Noir and Les Négresses Vertes.

== Biography ==
The band was formed in 1979 by two former milk delivery men, Lombrick Laul (bass player, and the future designer the band Bérurier Noir), and Masto Lowcost (born Tomas Huser, saxophonist and photographer). The two began stenciling the band's name on the walls of Paris which led to the originality of their look and their approach. The band was later joined by American-born keyboardist and singer Nina Childress, percussionist Raoul Gaboni, and vocalist Helno (born Noël Rota). The story of the band was they originally started as joke and picked which instruments they hated the most, and often were known playing mainly in squats in the Pali-Kao plant of Belleville. The music was often called "Wild, dadaist, juvenile, and anti-commercial", and the band had been likened to UK based punk bands the Slits, Crass and X-Ray Spex. With Laul and Nina's artistic backgrounds, the band also designed their own graphics and videos which often accompanied them when they played live.

The band's debut EP was the self-released vinyl Nepla Relou, which was later followed by a split with fellow French punk band MKB Fraction Provisoire, which had also featured drummer Raoul Gaboni in 1983. The band continued to play live supporting acts such as Einsturzende Neubauten before playing their last gig in February 1984 at the Théâtre du Petit Forum des Halles. A collected album from the first two EPs entitled I Love You, Fuck Off was released in 1987; another reissue of the band's music entitled La Qui Vache Rit was released in 1991. The latest self-titled compilation of Lucrate Milk's music was released in France in 2005, which included a DVD and a backstory of the band's success in the French punk underground. After the band's breakup, many of the members went on to form various other bands including Bérurier Noir. Nina Childress became a painter, and a member of the art collective the Frères Ripoulin. Helno (rechristened Helno Rota de Lourcqua) became the singer of Les Negresses Vertes; in 1993, he died of a heroin overdose at age 29.

== Discography ==
- 1981 Lustiges Tierquartett, EP 3 titres, Zeb Prod., MILK 001
- 1983 Nepla Relou, EP 4 titres, Autoprod., MILK 007
- 1984 Lucrate Milk / MKB, Split-LP avec MKB Fraction Provisoire, W.W. Rds, WW3326
- 1986 Live, K7, Androidia flux, AF 015 / V.I.S.A.
- 1987, Lucrate Milk, LP, Bondage Records, BR 009
- 1991 La Rage Qui Vit, CD / K7, Division Nada, NADA004 CD / K7,
- 1995 La Rage Qui Vit, CD / K7, Crash Disques, CRASH CD07/K707
- 2006 Lucrate Milk, DVD+2CD, Archives de la Zone Mondiale, FZM016
- 2006, Lucrate Milk, DVD, Archives de la Zone Mondiale, FZM017
- 2014, Lucrate Milk, LP : Archives de la Zone Mondiale. Digital : Atypeek Music ATY061

=== Compilations ===
- 1982 Passeport Pour l’Exportation / Cascades 82, K7 V.I.S.A. / Androidia flux, AF 00
- 1983 Canoë 1, K7, Canoë
- 1983 Canoë vidéo 1, VHS, Canoë
- 1984 30 tubes pour l'été, Gargl ! Tapes 001
- 1985 V.I.S.A. Présente, Compilation Live, LP, V.I.S.A./ Bondage Records, RRR 00B
- 1988 Bondage Records, LP, Oihuka, 0-164, Espagne
- 1988 Radio Bondage, LP/K7, Bondage Records
