= Halldór Laxness (album) =

Studio album by Mínus
- Released: 17 June 2003
- Recorded: 2002, Studíó Sýrland, Reykjavík
- Genre: Alternative rock, post-hardcore
- Length: 43:41
- Label: Victory Records
- Producer: Ken Thomas, Curver and Mínus

Mínus chronology
Jesus Christ Bobby (2000)	Halldór Laxness (2003)	The Great Northern Whalekill (2007)

Halldór Laxness is an album released by the Icelandic musical group Mínus.

It was recorded and mixed in Studio Sýrland, Iceland, by Ken Thomas and Curver in February and March 2003 except "Last leaf upon the tree", it was mixed at Tími and produced by Curver. Cover design by Sveinbjörn Pálsson, Art Direction by Börkur Sigþórsson, whose long-time collaboration with the band included most of their music videos. A rarer Icelandic version of the album was released earlier, with artwork by Börkur and Gunnar Vilhjálmsson. Singles from the album included 'Romantic Exorcism', 'Angel in Disguise', and 'The Long Face'. The Long Face was also featured on the UEFA Euro 2004 Video Game. The album's title came from the Icelandic author of the same name.

This album marked the beginning of the band's departure from their heavier and noise rock oriented roots, by incorporating mainly clean vocals, as well as focusing on an overall more melodic and accessible sound and more conventional songwriting.

== Track listing ==
All songs by Mínus, except "Last Leaf Upon the Tree", vocals and lyrics by Katiejane Garside and music by Mínus.

1. "Boys of Winter" – 3:53
2. "Who's Hobo" – 3:27 (re-release: 3:28)
3. "Romantic Exorcism" - 3:20
4. "Angel in Disguise" – 3:09 (re-release: 3:10)
5. "Flophouse Nightmares" – 2:49 (re-release: 2:47)
6. "Here Comes the Night" – 3:33
7. "The Long Face" – 4:32
8. "My Name Is Cocaine" – 3:59
9. "The Ravers" – 2:05
10. "I Go Vertigo" – 3:11 (re-release: 3:12)
11. "Insomniac" – 4:08 (re-release: 4:07)
12. "Last Leaf Upon the Tree" – 5:24 (re-release: 5:28)

The 2004 reissue came with different cover (yellow with the band) and the four videos for "Angel In Disguise", "Flophouse Nightmares", "Romantic Exorcism" and "Insomniac".

== Personnel ==
- Krummi – Vocals
- Frosti – Guitar
- Bjarni – Guitar
- Bjössi – Drums
- Johnny – Bass

== Reviews ==
- Metal Hammer: "every track is strong - 4/5"
- The Independent: "They might just be the rock 'n roll band the world has been waiting for"
- 5K- Kerrang! live review: "Minus are a welcome blast of March- fresh air, their maelstrom of thrash guitars and magisterially tortured vocals enough to leave cheeks burning and throats gasping for breath an icicle sharp album"
