= V.I.S.A. Présente =

Compilation album by various
- Released: 1984
- Recorded: 1983–1984
- Genre: Punk rock
- Label: Bondage Records/V.I.S.A. Cat. No.: RRR 00B

V.I.S.A. Présente was a live compilation released in 1984 by labels Bondage Records and V.I.S.A. This release included 14 tracks by experimental groups from the European alternative scene, including Kukl, an Icelandic group led by singer Björk Guðmundsdóttir next to second vocalist and trumpet player Einar Örn Benediktsson, Rubella Ballet, Lucrate Milk and more.

== Track listing ==
=== Side one ===
Track	Title	Length	Artist	Date and concert place	Lyrics	Audio clips
01	Love Life		Rubella Ballet	October 20, 1984 - S. Betrand	-	-
02	Foolish Virgin		A.R.T.	June 4, 1984 - Cithéa	-	-
03	Fight in Techno Nights		M.K.B.	November 27, 1983 - Pt A Mousson	-	-
04	Ella Choice		Ausweis	November 17, 1984 - Ste Honorine	-	-
05	Cancer l’Amour		Lucrate Milk	November 27, 1983 - Pt A Mousson	-	-
06	Voyage		Les Maitres	September 8, 1984 - Poitiers	-	-
07	A Ghost in the Jungle		Shock Corridor	February 23, 1984 - Opéra Night	-	-

=== Side two ===
Track	Title	Length	Artist	Date and concert place	Lyrics	Audio clips
01	Black Clown		Les Martyrs	January 7, 1984 - Th. du Forum	-	-
02	In den Letzen Zugen Lliegen		Die Bunker	Beauvais - May 1984	-	-
03	Dismembered		Kukl	September 19, 1984 - Eldorado	link	-
04	We Hate Work		The Brigades	June 2, 1984 - C.I.S.	-	-
05	Mickey Mouse is Dead		Subhumans	October 8, 1983 - Pali Kao	-	-
06	Automne 56		No Unauthorized	Lee Mee - April 1984	-	-
07	Changing Size in Mind		Mome Rath	October 20, 1984 - S. Betrand	-	-
