= The Great Northern Whalekill =

Studio album by Mínus
- Released: 2007
- Genre: Alternative rock, stoner rock
- Length: 37:45
- Label: Victory Records
- Producer: Ken Thomas, Curver and Mínus

Mínus chronology
Halldór Laxness (2003)	The Great Northern Whalekill (2007)

The Great Northern Whalekill is the fourth and most recent full-Length album released by the Icelandic group Mínus.

== Track listing ==
1. "Cat's Eyes" – 4:30
2. "Black and Bruised" – 3:17
3. "Shoot the Moon" - 2:56
4. "Kiss Yourself" – 2:33
5. "Throwaway Angel" – 4:05
6. "Not Afraid" – 3:06
7. "Rip It Up" – 2:53
8. "Rhythm Cure" – 3:02
9. "Futurist" – 3:48
10. "Shadow Heart" – 4:08
11. "Weekend Lovers" – 3:27

== Personnel ==
- Krummi - Vocals
- Frosti - Guitar
- Bjarni - Guitar
- Bjössi - Drums
- Johnny - Bass
