= Jean-Pierre Timbaud =

French resistance fighter and trade unionist

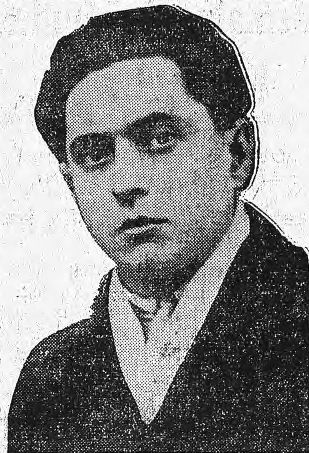
Portrait of Jean-Pierre Timbaud, published in L'Humanité on April 20, 1933

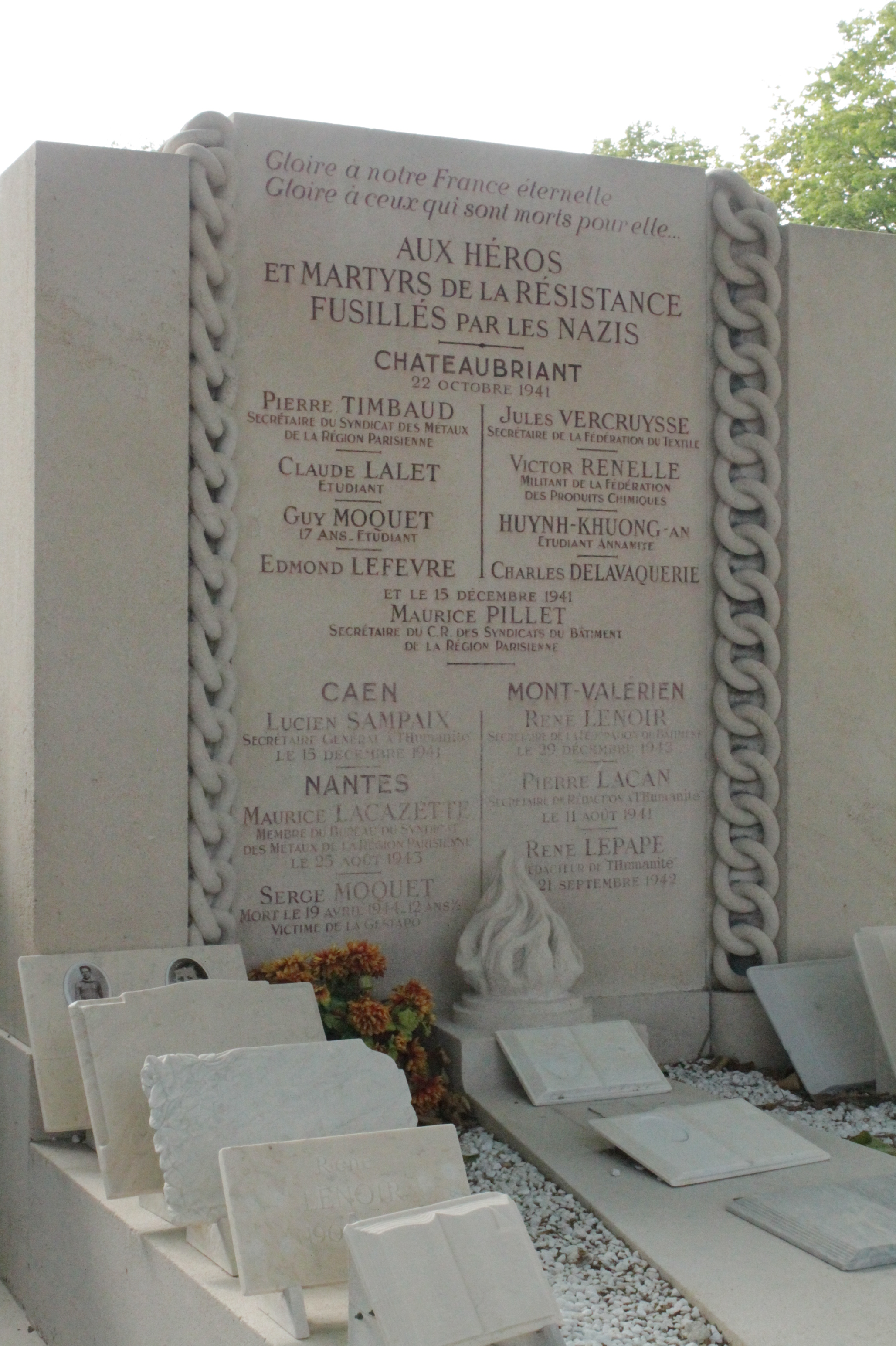
Monument to heroes of the French Resistance, Pere Lachaise Cemetery, Paris

Jean-Pierre Timbaud (Payzac, Dordogne, September 20, 1904 – Chateaubriant, October 22, 1941) was the secretary of the steelworkers’ trade union section of the Confédération Générale du Travail (CGT). He took part in the strikes which preceded the Popular Front. During the Second World War, he joined the Resistance and organized clandestine trade union committees.

Jean-Pierre Timbaud was executed by the Germans on October 22, 1941, along with 26 other Communist hostages detained in Châteaubriant, in punishment of the October 20 execution of Feldkommandant Karl Hotz, commander of the German troops in the Loire-Inférieure region, who was assassinated in Nantes by Resistants. Guy Môquet, 17 years old, was also part of the executed communist hostages, as well as Charles Michels, a Communist deputy of the 15th arrondissement of Paris. Jacques Duclos, Secretary General of the French Communist Party, said in an interview in the film The Sorrow and the Pity (1969), that Jean-Pierre Timbaud died crying out "Long live the German Communist Party!", while Léon Blum declared during the Riom Trial that he had sung the "Marseillaise" before the firing squad. Louis Aragon also stated: “The name of Timbaud among the Châteaubriant hostages was to be my direct reason, my individual reason to accept the clandestine duty which fell on me.”

Several cities in France, such as Paris and Limoges, have streets named after him. Previously, a street in East Berlin was named Timbaudstraße after him as well, but after German reunification, the street was renamed Fredersdorfer Straße.

Timbaud is the first name on the memorial to Heroes of the French Resistance in Pere Lachaise Cemetery in Paris.

== Bibliography ==
- Lucien Monjauvis, Jean-Pierre Timbaud (Editions Sociales, 1971)
- Fernand Grenier, Ceux de Châteaubriand (Editions Sociales, 1971)
- Louis Aragon, Le Témoin des Martyrs (1942)
- Lettres de fusillés 1941-1944

== See also ==
- Henri Rol-Tanguy
