= Riom Trial =

1942–43 trial in Vichy France

The Riom Trial (French: Procès de Riom; 19 February 1942 – 21 May 1943) was an attempt by the Vichy France regime, headed by Marshal Philippe Pétain, to prove that the leaders of the French Third Republic (1870–1940) had been responsible for France's defeat by Germany in 1940. The trial was held in the city of Riom in Auvergne, south-central France, and had mainly political aims – namely to project the responsibility of defeat onto the leaders of the left-wing Popular Front government that had been elected 3 May 1936.

The Supreme Court of Justice (Cour suprême de justice), created by a decree issued by Pétain on 30 July 1940, was empowered to judge:

1^{o} Les ministres, les anciens ministres ou leurs subordonnés immédiats, civils et militaires, accusés d'avoir commis des crimes ou délits dans l'exercice ou à l'occasion de leurs fonctions, ou d'avoir trahi les devoirs de leur charge;
2^{o} Toute personne accusée d'attentat contre la sûreté de l’État et de crimes et délits connexes;
3^{o} Tout coauteur ou complice des personnes visées aux paragraphes précédents.

Translation:

1st, the ministers, the former ministers, civil and military, accused of having committed crimes or délits while exercising their duties or on the occasion thereof, or of having betrayed the duties of their offices;
2nd, every person accused of having attacked the security of the state and of connected crimes or délits;
3nd, every co-perpetrator or accomplice of the persons targeted by the above paragraphs.

The period examined by the court was from 1936 (the beginning of the Popular Front administration, under Léon Blum) to 1940 and Paul Reynaud's cabinet. The trial, supported by the Nazis, had the secondary aim of demonstrating that the responsibility of the war rested with France (which had officially declared war on Germany on 3 September 1939, two days after the invasion of Poland) and not with Adolf Hitler and his policies. Once started in February 1942, the trial did not go according to plan. The defendants were largely successful in rebutting the charges, and won sympathetic coverage in the international press. The trial was eventually suspended in March 1942, and formally abandoned in May 1943.

== Context ==
There were originally seven defendants at the Riom Trial, though Pétain later withdrew the charges against Paul Reynaud and Georges Mandel without explanation, surrendering them to the Germans instead; Mandel was later executed by the Vichy regime's Milice. The five who stood trial were:

- Léon Blum (born 1872), leader of the French Section of the Workers' International (SFIO) socialist party and a two-time Prime Minister of France (4 June 1936 to 22 June 1937 and 13 March 1938 to 10 April 1938) during the rule of the left-wing coalition Popular Front. As a Jew, Blum was a target of particular hatred for the Vichy regime and the Nazis, and he was widely seen as the principal defendant in the trial. Blum was defended by Samuel Spanien who was Secrétaire de la Conférence du barreau de Paris.
- Édouard Daladier (born 1884), Prime Minister of France from 10 April 1938 to 21 March 1940, former member of the Radical-Socialist Party. He was among the 27 French deputies and senators who had fled Metropolitan France on 21 June 1940 from Bordeaux on board the ship Massilia, a month before the vote on constitutional changes that dissolved the Third Republic and gave extraordinary powers to Pétain. Daladier was arrested on his arrival in Vichy-governed French Morocco on 8 August 1940.
- Maurice Gamelin (born 1872), former commander-in-chief of the French Army during the May–June 1940 Battle of France
- Guy La Chambre (1898), former Minister for the French Air Force
- Robert Jacomet, former Controller-General of Army Administration

More than 400 witnesses were called, many of them soldiers who were supposed to testify that the French army was not adequately equipped to resist the Wehrmacht invasion of May–June 1940. It was alleged that Blum's legislation, enacted after the 1936 Matignon Agreements which had introduced the 40-hour working week and paid leave for workers and had nationalised some businesses, had undermined France's industrial and defence capabilities. The left-wing Popular Front government was also held to have been weak in suppressing "subversive elements and revolutionists."

Owing to the changing international context, including the June 1941 invasion of the USSR, and deterioration of popular support for the Vichy regime, Marshal Philippe Pétain decided to speed up the process. He thus announced on the radio, prior to the beginning of the trial, that he would himself condemn the guilty parties after having heard the advice of the Political Justice Council (Conseil de justice politique) which he had set up. Pétain was entitled to such an act after the Constitutional decree of 27 January 1941. The newly created Political Justice Council handed in its conclusions on 16 October 1941. After Pétain's condemnation of the political responsibles, the Riom Trial was supposed to try the men as citizens. Although the president of the court, Pierre Caous, declared at the outset that the trial was not to be a political one, it was widely seen as a show trial, in France and abroad.

== Opening ==
The trial began on 19 February 1942 before the Vichy regime's Supreme Court of Justice, which was empowered by a decree to "judge whether the former ministers, or their immediate subordinates, had betrayed the duties of their offices by way of acts which contributed to the transition from a state of peace to a state of war before September 1939, and which after that date worsened the consequences of the situation thus created." The crimes with which the defendants were charged were retrospectively created, i.e. at the time these acts were allegedly carried out, they had not been illegal. This was contrary to the principle of nullum crimen, nulla poena sine praevia lege poenali which forbids retroactive application of penal law.

Gamelin, the former commander-in-chief of the French Army, refused to recognise the right of the court to try him and maintained complete silence. La Chambre and Jacomet were seen as minor figures. Daladier and Blum were thus left to carry the burden of the defence. Blum, who was a lawyer as well as a politician and polemicist, turned in what was widely recognised as a brilliant performance, cross-examining the government's witnesses and exposing the falsity and illegitimacy of the charges. He argued that the largest reductions in defence spending under the Third Republic had taken place under governments in which both Pétain and Pierre Laval, the Vichy regime's prime minister, had held offices. On the other hand, he showed that the Popular Front had made the greatest war efforts since 1918. Blum even defended the French Communist Party (PCF), declaring about Jean-Pierre Timbaud, a Communist who had been executed along with 26 other communist hostages in retaliation for the assassination of a Nazi official (Karl Hotz), the following: "I was often opposed to him. However, he has been executed by a firing-squad and died singing the Marseillaise... Thus, I have nothing to add concerning the PCF."

Although the court was supposed to investigate only the period from 1936 to 1940, excluding military operations from September 1939 to June 1940, the defendants refused to accept this and demonstrated how the responsibility of the defeat of 1940 rested mainly on failures of the French general staff. They also showed that the June 1940 armistice agreed by the Vichy government had been signed even though the French Army still possessed considerable forces in metropolitan France.

== Suspension and ending ==
Journalists from neutral countries were allowed to cover the trial, and their reports praised the conduct of the defendants, particularly Blum, and condemned the basis of the trial, although they conceded that president of court Caous had conducted the trial fairly. This generated sympathy for the defendants in many countries: Eleanor Roosevelt sent Blum a telegram on his birthday in April 1942, and on 9 April 1942 The New York Times published an article titled "To Léon Blum". The Vichy state-controlled press in France, however, reported the opening of the trial with great fanfare, but thereafter reported less and less of the proceedings, as most of them were unfavourable to the regime.

By April, the Germans were increasingly irritated by what they saw as the incompetent conduct of the trial. Hitler declared on 15 March 1942: "A trial is taking place these days in France, whose main characteristic is that not a word is spoken about the guilt of those responsible for this war. Only a lack of preparation for war is being discussed. We are here looking at a mentality which is incomprehensible to us but which is perhaps better suited than any other to reveal the causes of this new war."

It was then decided that the trial should be stopped in order to avoid further disappointment. The German ambassador to Vichy France, Otto Abetz, on orders from Germany, told Laval that the trial was becoming detrimental and should be abandoned. On 14 April 1942, the trial was suspended, allegedly so that "additional information" could be obtained. It formally ended on 21 May 1943. Blum and Daladier were later deported to Germany and interned at Buchenwald concentration camp in the section reserved for high-ranking prisoners. As the Allied armies approached Buchenwald, they were transferred to Dachau, near Munich, and in late April 1945, together with other notable inmates, to Tyrol. They were rescued in May 1945.

== See also ==
- Battle of France
- Vichy France
- The Vichy 80
- Strange Defeat, book by French historian Marc Bloch on causes of the 1940 defeat of France
- Popular Front
- Julia Bracher, "Riom 1942: Le Procès", Omnibus, 2012 (trial transcripts, decrees and the diaries of Daladier and Blum, in French)
