= Miranda (album) =

Studio album by Tappi Tíkarrass
- Released: December 23, 1983
- Studios: Southern Studios (London, England)
- Genres: Punk rock; post-punk; new wave
- Length: 37:50
- Label: Gramm
- Producers: Tappi Tíkarrass; Tony Cook

Tappi Tíkarrass chronology
Bitið fast í vitið (1982)	Miranda (1983)

Inner sleeve drawing

Miranda is the first studio album by Icelandic punk band Tappi Tíkarrass. It was released on December 23, 1983, through Gramm.

The inner sleeve features the lyrics of "Mýrin Andar" handwritten by Björk and a black-and-white child-like illustration.

== Track listing ==
All tracks are written by Tappi Tíkarrass.

Side A
No.	Title	Length
1.	"Miranda"	1:03
2.	"Skrið"	2:02
3.	"Kríó"	3:22
4.	"Íþróttir"	3:16
5.	"Tjet"	3:18
6.	"Lækning"	4:09
7.	"Drek-Lek"	1:49

Side B
No.	Title	Length
8.	"Beri-Beri"	2:42
9.	"Hvítibjörn"	2:28
10.	"Sokkar"	3:19
11.	"Með-Tek"	4:31
12.	"Get Ekki Sofið"	3:50
13.	"Mýrin Andar"	2:01
Total length:		37:50

== Personnel ==
Credits adapted from the album's liner notes.

- Tappi Tíkarrass – production
- Björk Guðmundsdóttir – vocals (tracks 2–12); keyboards
- Eyþór Árnalds – vocals (tracks 1, 13); backing vocals (tracks 7, 12)
- Jakob Smári Magnússon – bass
- Eyjólfur Jóhannsson – guitar
- Oddur F. Sigurbjarnason – drums
- Tony Cook – production, engineering
