= Charles Michels =

French trade unionist (1903–1941)

see also Charles Michels (Paris Métro)

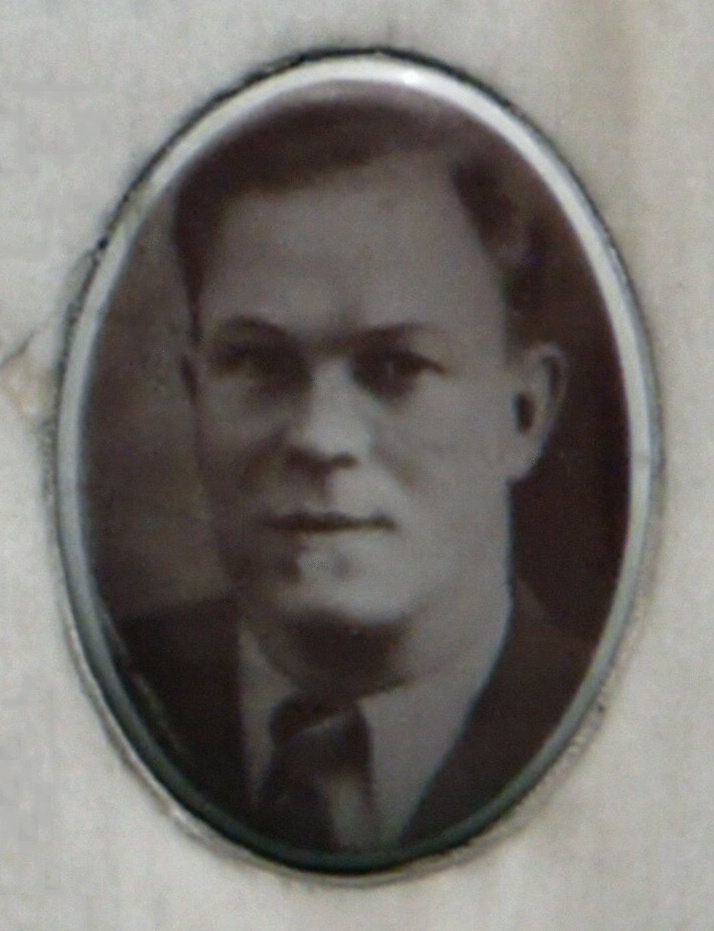

Charles Michels (French pronunciation: [ʃaʁl(ə) miʃɛl]; 6 March 1903, in Paris – 22 October 1941, in Châteaubriant) was a trade unionist and communist activist. He was député of the 15th arrondissement in Paris. During the Second World War, Michels was one of the 48 hostages shot in Chateaubriant, Nantes and Paris in retaliation for the assassination of Karl Hotz, Feldkommandant of Nazi-occupied Nantes.

== Childhood and youth ==
Michels was born of an unknown father. In 1906, he was adopted by Jean Michels, a boilermaker who married his mother Louise Lecoq, a labourer. He was raised in the 13th arrondissement of Paris and had to start working very young: he was hired at eleven years in a shoe factory.

== Union activist ==
In 1920, Charles Michels was fired from his then workplace where he was a delegate of the CGT union. With a solid constitution, he supplemented his salary by boxing at "Folies Belleville". After his military service, in 1923-1924, he became an instructor at the FSGT (Fédération sportive et gymnique du travail), the sports organization of the CGT. Later, as head of the family, he tried to increase his level of education by himself.

Charles Michels joined the French Communist Party in 1926. He gradually established himself as one of the union leaders of the CGTU Federation of Hides and Skins, of which he became secretary in 1929. As such, and also as leader of the FSGT (he was part of a football team), he went to the USSR. In 1931, he became permanent CGTU and will remain in the governing bodies of the CGTU or later of the CGT. An eloquent speaker, he helps support all the strikes in his sector. In 1935, he was active in the fusion of the two federations of hides and skins (CGTU and CGT) . He becomes assistant secretary of the Unified National Federation of Hides and Leather.

== Communist Parliamentarian ==
On 26 April 1936 he ran for the legislative elections in the 3rd district of the 15th arrondissement of Paris, and was elected to the National Assembly on the following 3 May with 58.6% of the votes, against the outgoing Independent Radicals député, Georges Boucheron. In the first round, he had collected 3,258 votes against 2,353 Marceau Pivert and 1,059 Duteil (Proletarian Unity Party) out of 11,816 voters.

Although the PCF was dissolved in September 1939 for activity tending to "propagate the slogans emanating from or pertaining to the Third International ", Michels surrendered on 9 January 1940 at the opening session of the Chamber of Deputies where he met André Mercier, Raymond Guyot and Fernand Grenier. Their presence provoked a fight and their expulsion. He was stripped of his parliamentary mandate on 20 February, like all Communist deputies.

== Second World War ==
Michels joined the French Army in September 1939 and was demobilized on 20 July 1940. He returned to Paris and made contact with Jean Catelas, clandestine communist leader in the Paris region, investing in the reorganization of the CGTU, Federation of Hides and Skins.

At the beginning of October 1940, while preparing to go into hiding, he was arrested and interned at Aincourt, then at Fontevrault and at Clairvaux on 21 February 1941.

In May, he arrived at the Choisel camp at Châteaubriant, Loire-Inférieure. He was a member of the underground committee of the camp, and, in June 1941, prepared the escape of four communist leaders: Fernand Grenier, Henri Raynaud, Leon Mauvais and Eugene Hénaff.

Following an attack on Karl Hotz, head of the Kommandantur de Nantes, he was shot by the Nazis on 22 October 1941, at the Carrière des Rifles alongside 26 other hostages in the camp of Châteaubriant, including Guy Môquet and Jean-Pierre Timbaud, and 21 hostages in Nantes and Paris.

== Tributes ==
There is a Plaque affixed to the facade of the building inhabited by Michels at 51, rue des Bois in the 19th Arrondissement.

Since July 1945, in the 15th arrondissement of Paris, the former Place Beaugrenelle bears his name (Place Charles-Michels). Likewise the nearby Paris Métro station is now known as Charles Michels.

Michels is also mentioned in the 201st of 480 memories cited by Georges Perec, in his text Je me souviens ("Memories/I Remember").

== Family ==
In 1923 he married Aimée Malagnoux, an old neighbour with whom he had two daughters. He is the great-uncle of Helno, singer of the band Les Négresses Vertes.
