= Legend (Icelandic band) =

Icelandic alternative rock/electronic band

- Origin: Reykjavík, Iceland
- Genres: Industrial; Industrial metal
- Years active: 2012–present
- Labels: Artoffact Records; Storming the base
- Members: Krummi Björgvinsson; Halldór Á. Björnsson; Frosti Jón Runólfsson

Legend are an Icelandic alternative rock/electronic band from Reykjavík.

== History ==
Legend is an Icelandic duo of Krummi Björgvinsson and Halldór Á. Björnsson, who release music under the Canadian label Artoffact Records. Björgvinsson who was previously the singer and songwriter for Mínus, acts as Legend's singer and manager. Their musical style is experimental, drawing on electronica, at times being classified as a form of 1980s Electro-industrial music. Their debut album, Fearless, has been compared with Nine Inch Nails and Depeche Mode.

== Albums ==
- Fearless (2012)
- Midnight Champion (2017)
