= Eyþór Arnalds =

Icelandic musician

- Born: Eyþór Laxdal Arnalds; 24 November 1964 (age 61); Reykjavík, Iceland
- Citizenship: Icelandic
- Education: Reykjavík University (MBA)
- Occupations: Musician, composer, businessman
- Website: eythorarnalds.com

Eyþór Laxdal Arnalds (born 24 November 1964) is an Icelandic musician, composer, cellist, and businessman. His musical work includes classical, electronic, and pop genres, and he has also held executive roles in technology and energy sectors as well as positions in local politics.

== Early life and education ==
Eyþór was born in Reykjavík, Iceland. He began playing music and working in theater at an early age. He studied cello with Gunnar Kvaran in Reykjavík and later with Frances-Marie Uitti in Amsterdam. He studied composition with Atli Heimir Sveinsson in Reykjavík and with Dutch composer Louis Andriessen in Amsterdam.

Eyþór graduated with a composition degree that included the performance of his symphonic work Terta, written in three movements for the Iceland Symphony Orchestra. He later received an MBA from Reykjavík University and completed executive education in economic history at Harvard University.

== Music career ==
Eyþór began his music career as a founding member and singer of the new wave band Tappi Tíkarrass, which also featured Björk among its members. He later became a singer and cellist in the band Todmobile, an Icelandic pop and rock group. Todmobile won Best Band and Best Album at the inaugural Icelandic Music Awards in 1994.

Along with the bands, Eyþór has composed music for theater, dance, film, and symphony orchestra. His compositions often blend classical and electronic elements. He has collaborated with artists including Tony Hadley, Midge Ure, and Nik Kershaw in recent live performances with Todmobile.

In 2025, he released a solo album titled The Busy Child, which features 12 tracks composed for up to 20 cellos. A string orchestra version of the album was conducted by Viktor Orri Árnason. The album explores themes related to artificial intelligence and human identity.

== Business and technology ==
Eyþór worked in the technology sector with companies including OZ and Enpocket, both of which were later acquired by Nokia. He served as CEO of Íslandssími (now Vodafone Iceland) from 1999 to 2001 and was CEO of Strokkur Energy from 2007 to 2017, leading different energy industrial projects. He has also been involved in eco-tourism and media ventures.

== Political involvement ==
Eyþór served on the municipal council of Árborg from 2006 to 2014. In 2018, he was elected to the Reykjavík City Council as a representative of the Independence Party and was chosen as the party's lead candidate (oddviti) in the municipal election that year. During his term, Eyþór voiced opposition to the city's policies on urban traffic, including speed limit reductions, which he argued increased traffic on residential streets.

His time on the Reykjavík council included strained coalition negotiations, with Mayor Dagur B. Eggertsson publicly ruling out forming a coalition with the Independence Party while Eyþór was its lead candidate. In December 2021, Eyþór announced he would not seek re-election as the party’s lead candidate in the upcoming municipal election.

== Controversies ==
Eythor has been involved in controversies related to media ownership and political transparency. In 2017, it was reported that he became a key shareholder in the media company that publishes Morgunblaðið. His involvement raised questions due to the company's financial situation and its connections to the fishing company Samherji.

In 2019, calls were made for Eyþór and Samherji to clarify their roles and ownership stakes in Morgunblaðið. Critics argued that the financial and editorial independence of the media outlet was unclear. In the following year, Eyþór rejected claims that Samherji might regain control over the media company, describing such allegations as unfounded. He also dismissed criticism from members of the Pirate Party as exclusionary politics.

== Personal life ==
Eyþór was married to singer-songwriter Móeiður Júníusdóttir (internationally known as Móa), with whom he has two children. He later married yoga instructor Dagmar Una Ólafsdóttir, and they also have two sons together. In a 2019 interview, Eyþór confirmed that he and Dagmar Una had legally separated. Since 2021, he has been in a relationship with the Icelandic visual artist Ástríður Jósefín Ólafsdóttir.

== Selected discography ==
=== Solo ===
- The Busy Child (2025)
