= Todmobile =

Icelandic band

Todmobile is an Icelandic pop/rock band, active since 1988.

== Biography ==
The band was created in the summer of 1988 around Þorvaldur Bjarni Þorvaldsson, a vocalist, guitarist, and record producer.

In the beginning, all 3 members were part of local bands and studying at the Reykjavík College of Music in May 1989. "Sameiginlegt" was the name of their first demo, which made it onto the first studio album, Betra En Nokkuð Annað. The following year, their most memorable self-titled album was released to rave reviews and respectability for their live concerts. This was followed by the release of their debut English-language songs "Opera" and "All Around".

After the huge success of the Spillt album in 1993, the members of Todmobile moved onto other projects. Eyþór joined a band called Bong, which had success in 1994 in both Iceland and the UK. Andrea fronted a swing band called Citysister while collaborating with Þorvaldur in 1994 to form Tweety, who made music in the dance/rock and pop genres, and she also took the lead role of Eva Perón in the Icelandic production of Evita.

In February 1996, after fans wrote to Andrea and Þorvaldur pleading for them to revive Todmobile, they re-formed under the original name of Todmobile. Andrea, Þorvaldur and new lead singer Vilhjálmur Goði released their "comeback" CD titled Perlur og svín and once again started touring shortly after the album.

Solo projects once again ensued, Þorvaldur being the main success after co-writing the Icelandic ESC 1999 entry "All Out Of Luck" for Selma Björnsdóttir, which placed second. In 2003 Todmobile released their first live CD and DVD – Sinfónía, which was a compilation of all their hits with the Iceland Symphony Orchestra.

In 2009, Eyþór Ingi Gunnlaugsson took over the singing duties from Eyþór Arnalds. Eyþór Ingi Gunnlaugsson represented Iceland at the ESC 2013, with his song "Ég á líf".

2014's Úlfur includes guest appearances by Jon Anderson (formerly of Yes) and Steve Hackett (formerly of Genesis).

in 2016, they received the special honour of having Nik Kershaw as their special guest in Harpa, Reykjavík, on November 11. He returned in 2023 with Midge Ure of Ultravox and Tony Hadley of Spandau Ballet for Todmobiles 35 anniversary show.

== Band members ==
Original line-up (1990–1993)

- Andrea Gylfadóttir, vocals
- Þorvaldur Bjarni Þorvaldsson
- Eyþór Arnalds, vocals & cello (1988–1993, 2003–2008, 2021-present)

The band was joined by Atli Örvarsson on keyboards (1990–1991) and Ólafur Hólm (drums) (1990–1991) replaced by Matthías Hemstock (from 1991 onwards)

Reformed line-up (1996–1997)

- Vilhjálmur Goði, vocals
- Andrea Gylfadóttir
- Þorvaldur Bjarni Þorvaldsson

Line-up (2011–2021)

- Eyþór Ingi Gunnlaugsson, vocals (2009–)
- Andrea Gylfadóttir, vocals
- Þorvaldur Bjarni Þorvaldsson, guitar
- Eiður Arnarsson, bass guitar
- Kjartan Valdemarsson, keyboards

Present line-up (2011–2021)

- Eyþór Arnalds, vocals (2021–)
- Andrea Gylfadóttir, vocals
- Þorvaldur Bjarni Þorvaldsson, guitar
- Eiður Arnarsson, bass guitar
- Kjartan Valdemarsson, keyboards

== Awards ==
- Todmobile won 5 Icelandic Music Awards for Best Song, Best Songwriter, Best Lyrics, Best Album for Spillt and Best Band of the Year.

== Discography ==
- 1989: Betra en nokkuð annað featuring the hits Stelpurokk & Ég heyri raddir.
- 1990: Todmobile, 7000 units sold; featuring the hits Pöddulagið & Eldlagið.
- 1991: Ópera
- 1991: Tarantulo
- 1991: Todmobile (English version)
- 1992: 2603
- 1993: Passion Time
- 1993: Spillt
- 1996: Perlur og svín
- 2000: Best
- 2004: Sinfónía with the Iceland Symphony Orchestra
- 2005: Brot af því besta
- 2006: Ópus 6
- 2009: Spiladós: 1989–2009
- 2011: 7
- 2013: Jon Anderson with Todmobile in Iceland
- 2014: Úlfur
- 2015: Ævintýri
- 2016: The Riddle
- 2018: Hermaur (1988-2018)
