= Mínus =

Icelandic rock band

- Origin: Iceland
- Genres: Post-hardcore, alternative rock, noise rock
- Years active: 1998–2012, 2020, 2023–present
- Labels: Smekkleysa, Victory

Mínus are an Icelandic alternative rock/post-hardcore band from Reykjavík, formed in 1998. They were signed to the record label Smekkleysa. Mínus have shared the stage with, among others, Metallica, Foo Fighters, and Queens of the Stone Age.

== History ==
"The first great rock 'n' roll gang of the 21st century" (Kerrang!) – has supported acts like Metallica, Foo Fighters and Queens of the Stone Age. Since their first UK tour of January 2002, Minus have been lighting fires across mainland Europe and America. Following the 2003 release and 2004 re-release of Halldor Laxness they spent most of 2003 and 2004 touring Europe, both as a supporting band as well as several of their own Headlining tours, as well as playing the Main Stage at the 2004 Leeds Festival in the UK. The past years has seen them making friends and sharing stages and with the likes of Muse, The Distillers, Amen, Biffy Clyro, Hundred Reasons, Hell Is for Heroes, The Eighties B-Line Matchbox Disaster, and the already mentioned; Metallica, Foo Fighters and Queens of the Stone Age. Minus saw a breakthrough with their second album 'Jesus Christ Bobby' released 2001 on The Sugarcubes' Smekkleysa label. the music was full of white noise and aural extremities. It introduced Minus to the world and was recognized by the likes of NME, Metal Hammer, Terrorizer and Kerrang!, whose 5/5 review frothed that Minus are – "the most important noise band to emerge in years". Their 3rd release: 'Halldor Laxness' – titled in tribute to Iceland's Nobel Prize-winning author (1908–98) – contained a sound with less screaming and heavy instrumentals, and a softer more melodic approach. This album was also well received by the critics.

Minus became a four-piece in 2007 following the departure of Johnny (bass) and original guitarist Frosti. Siggi replaced Johnny on bass. They released their latest offspring in Iceland, named "The Great Northern Whale Kill", on 23 May 2007. In March 2008 the album then became available in Europe, including the UK.

Since 2005, the band have reduced activity considerably, with Side Projects amongst some of its members, and longer periods of time between new releases.

In 2010, the band announced that their fifth studio album 'KOL', the follow-up to 2007's The Great Northern Whalekill was finished. However, this album wasn’t released and it is not known when it will surface. The band never officially announced a breakup, but there have been many years of inactivity. Vocalist Krummi now remains more active in his work with his now main project LEGEND.

Mínus revealed a surprise reunion on 17 July 2020, to mark drummer Bjossi's 40th birthday in Iceland, and played a 25-minute set for the occasion, consisting of several songs from Halldor Laxness. They were joined by former members Frosti on guitar and Johnny on Bass. This was the first time in a decade that the band had played together onstage.

In November 2023, Mínus revealed another two reunion shows scheduled for 17–18 May 2024 in Iceland.

In November 2024, Mínus played at Iceland Airwaves.

== Members ==
- Krummi Björgvinsson – vocals (1998–2012, 2020, 2023-Present)
- Bjarni Sigurðarson – guitar (1998–2012, 2020, 2023-Present)
- Björn Stefánsson – drums (1998–2012, 2020, 2023-Present)
- Frosti Logason - guitar (1998-2007, 2020, 2023-Present)
- Þröstur Jónsson (Johnny) – bass (2002–2007, 2020, 2023-Present)

Former members

- Ívar Snorrason – bass (1998–2002)
- Siggi – bass (2007-2012)

== Discography ==
- Hey Johnny! (1999)
- Jesus Christ Bobby (2001)
- Halldór Laxness (2003)
- The Great Northern Whalekill (2007)
