= V.I.S.A. =

French record label

V.I.S.A. logo

V.I.S.A. is a French independent record label created in 1982 by Thierry De Lavau and Yves Lecarpentier.

V.I.S.A.’s first releases were tapes by French alternative punk rock bands, but it eventually expanded the music range and formats releasing CDs and LPs from other European bands of new wave, art rock, modern classical and experimental music.

In 1995 V.I.S.A. released Deep Inside, an album by RAENDOM.

After a long, long sleep V.I.S.A. became ViSA and came back in 2014 with Terrain d'Entente a compilation with various artists. In 2015, for the COP21, ViSA released "Disappearing world" an EP with the band Igor and the hippie land. In November 2016 ViSA released "Wonderful Circle", the Igor & the hippie land's second album In April 2017 ViSA released a double LP for the 35th anniversary of Radio Libertaire (Les 35 ans de Radio Libertaire) with various French rebel music taken from the usual playlist of this radio. The front cover is designed by Jacques Tardi.

== Discography ==
The V.I.S.A. discography is divided into three collections: Androidia Flux (AF), Rebel Flux (RF), and Ultima Flux (UF).

=== Adroidia Flux ===
Year	Catalogue number	Title	Artist
1982	AF 000	Cascades 82	Miscellaneous
1983	AF 001	Freitod 82-83	Freitod
1983	AF 002	Les Maitres	Les Maitres
1983	AF 003	Insane	Insane
1983	AF 004	Die Bunker	Die Bunker
1983	AF 005	Meilleurs Extraits des Deux Concerts à Paris	Bérurier Noir
1983	AF 006	No Unauthorized	No Unauthorized
1984	AF 007	Une Nuit à l'Opéra	Shock Corridor
1984	AF 008	Ya la sa sa sa	Les Martyrs
1984	AF 009	Rising Free	Miscellaneous
1984	AF 010 / RRR00A	My Tailor is Communist	The Brigades
1984	AF 011	Mome Rath	Mome Rath
1985	AF 012	A.R.T.	A.R.T.
1985	AF 013	Ausweis	Ausweis
1985	AF 014	Spasmodique from Rotterdam	Spasmodique
1986	AF 015	Lucrate Milk	Lucrate Milk
1986	AF 016	Achwgha Ney Modei	Achwgha Ney Modei
1987	AF 017	Kni Crik	Kni Crik
1988	AF 018	La Yassa Cassette	OULOUM BOUTOU

==== Co-production with Bondage Records ====
Year	Catalogue number	Title	Artist
1984	RRR 0B	V.I.S.A. Présente	Miscellaneous

=== Rebel Flux ===
Year	Catalogue number	Title	Artist
1985	RF 001	Fresh Hate	Political Asylum
1985	RF 002	Rubella Ballet	Rubella Ballet
1985	RF 003	KUKL à Paris 14.9.84	Kukl
1986	RF 004	Richard III	Richard III
1986	RF 005	Dau al Set	Dau al Set
1988	RF 006 / V.I.S.A.	Voyez Comme on s'haine	Laid Thenardier
1989	RF 007	A Bas Toutes les Armées	Miscellaneous
1990	RF 009	Il Pleut des Coups Durs	Laid Thenardier
1990	RF 010	IVu à la Télé	Interim
1992	RF 011	Ignorance is Male Violence	Informers
1993	RF 012	Blasfemia	Dezerter

=== Ultima Flux ===
Year	Catalogue number	Title	Artist
1987	UF 001	Pas Demain	Ausweis
1987	UF 002	Allah el Watan el Malik	Dazibao
1987	UF 003	Les Musiques de la Honte	Dazibao
1988	UF 004	In Out	Clair Obscur
1988	UF 005	Dreams are Not Free	Die Bunker
1988	UF 006	Blume	Clair Obscur
1988	UF 007	Amok	Dazibao
1988	UF 009	Tales from Anywhere Else	Alto Bruit
1989	UF 010	Aither	Vox Populi
1988	UF 012	Out of Majors	Miscellaneous
1988	UF 011	The Kenny Rodgers Greatest Hit	Blurt
1992	UF 013	Sans Titre	Clair Obscur
1992	UF 014	Un Peu	Miscellaneous
1992	UF 015	Beaucoup	Miscellaneous
1992	UF 016	Passionément	Miscellaneous
1992	UF 017	A la Folie!	Miscellaneous
1995	UF 022	Deep Inside	RAENDOM

== See also ==
- List of record labels
