= Nina Childress =

French and American painter, based in Paris

- Born: Christine Childress; 1961 (age 64–65); Pasadena, California, U.S.

Nina Childress (born Christine Childress, 1961) is a French-American visual artist, based in Paris, France.

== Life and work ==
Born in Pasadena, California to Brigitte Cormier and William Stephen Childress, Childress studied in Paris at the Ecole National Supérieure des Arts Décoratifs (ENSAD). At the end of the 1970s, she took an active part in the French punk movement with her group, Lucrate Milk. She started painting at the same time and, from 1985 to 1989, joined the street artist collective Les Frères Ripoulin.

Her work has been shown internationally in museums, art centers and galleries. In 2012, the Museum d'art moderne et contemporain (Geneva) held a major exhibition of her paintings. In 2013, the Palais de Tokyo commissioned her Green Curtain: a large in-situ installation for the entrance of the museum. Nina Childress's paintings can be found in the collections of the Centre Pompidou and the Musée d'Art Moderne in Paris, the Musées de Lausanne, the MAMCO (Geneva), the MAC VAL (Vitry-sur-Seine), the Fonds National d'art Contemporain and numerous FRAC and private collections in France and abroad.

Childress has been studio head of painting at the École nationale supérieure des Beaux-Arts since 2019. Prior to 2019, Childress taught at the École nationale supérieure d’art (ENSA) in Nancy, France. Childress has been awarded the rank of Chevalier de la Légion d'Honneur, France's highest honorary decoration, for her contributions to culture. In 2024 Nina Childress was elected to the Painting Section of the Académie des Beaux-Arts, only the second woman to hold this position. The installation took place 25 Jun 2025.
