= Mlah =

Studio album by Les Négresses Vertes
- Released: 1988
- Recorded: November 1988
- Studios: Studio Davout, Paris
- Genres: World, gypsy punk
- Length: 47:57
- Labels: Delabel/Virgin (EU); Sire/Warner Bros. (US)
- Producers: Clive Martin, Sodi

Les Négresses Vertes chronology
Mlah (1988)	Famille nombreuse (1991)

Professional ratings
Review scores
Source	Rating
AllMusic	4/5 stars

Mlah is the debut album by Les Négresses Vertes, released in 1988.

== Track listing ==
All songs written by Les Négresses Vertes

1. "La Valse"
2. "Zobi la Mouche"
3. "C'est Pas la Mer à Boire"
4. "Voilà l'Été"
5. "Orane"
6. "La Faim des Haricots"
7. "Les Yeux de Ton Père"
8. "Il"
9. "L'Homme des Marais"
10. "Les Rablablas les Roubliblis"
11. "Marcelle Ratafia"
12. "La Danse des Négresses Vertes"
13. "Hey Maria"
14. "Le Père Magloire"

== Personnel ==
- Helno – vocals
- Mellino – vocals, guitar
- Mathieu Canavese – guitar, accordion, background vocals
- Paulo – guitar, bass, background vocals
- Abraham Sirinix – harmonica, trombone, percussion, background vocals
- Twist – trumpet, percussion
- L'Ami Ro – piano, percussion, background vocals
- Gaby – drums, percussion
- Iza, Juanita, Julo, Nono – background vocals

== Charts ==
Chart performance for Mlah
Chart (1990)	Peak position
Australian Albums (ARIA)	96
Dutch Albums (Album Top 100)	85
New Zealand Albums (RMNZ)	46
Swedish Albums (Sverigetopplistan)	41
