= Kukl (band) =

Icelandic post-punk group, active 1983–1986

- Kukl in 1984

Background information
- Origin: Reykjavík, Iceland
- Genres: Post-punk
- Years active: 1983–1986
- Labels: Crass Records; One Little Indian; V.I.S.A. Gramm
- Past members: Björk Guðmundsdóttir; Einar Örn Benediktsson; Guðlaugur Kristinn Óttarsson; Sigtryggur Baldursson; Birgir Mogensen; Einar Arnaldur Melax

Kukl (often stylized as KUKL or K.U.K.L.) was an Icelandic post-punk group in the 1980s, most notable for being one of Björk's first bands.

== History ==
=== Beginnings and first releases ===
The band formed in August 1983 when Ásmundur Jónsson from Gramm Records wanted to create an avant-garde supergroup to perform on the final episode of a radio show called Áfangar. He assembled vocalist Björk Guðmundsdóttir of Exodus and Tappi Tíkarrass, trumpeter and vocalist Einar Örn Benediktsson (a.k.a. Einar Örn) of Purrkur Pillnikk, keyboardist Einar Arnaldur Melax from the surrealistic group Medúsa, and bassist Birgir Mogensen from Spilafífl, as well as drummer Sigtryggur Baldursson (a.k.a. Trix) and guitarist Guðlaugur Kristinn Óttarsson (a.k.a. God Krist) from the band Þeyr.

After two weeks of writing and rehearsals, the band played the radio session. Their ensuing enthusiasm for the experience led to a decision to make the group permanent.

Kukl's first live show was on September 20, 1983, opening for Crass in Reykjavík, followed shortly after by their first release, the 7" single "Söngull" (Gramm).

=== The Eye ===
Einar Örn had studied media at the Polytechnic of Central London, which enabled him to come in contact with UK anarcho-punk groups such as Flux of Pink Indians and Crass. This led to the 1984 release of Kukl's first album, The Eye (produced by Crass member Penny Rimbaud) on the Crass Records label. The title The Eye came from Björk’s favorite book, Story of the Eye by Georges Bataille (1928), whose plot involved the sexual adventures of a young French couple within a violent context. The album cover was illustrated by Dada Nana. The Eye contained an English-language version of “Söngull”, retitled “Dismembered”. A video clip was shot for the song “Anna”, directed by Óskar Jónasson.

=== Kukl à Paris, touring and Megakukl ===
A live performance from September 1984 at L'Eldorado in Paris, France yielded Kukl á Paris 14.9.84, a cassette-only release issued in 1985 by independent French record label V.I.S.A. Kukl toured Europe during 1985, visiting the Netherlands during the Pandora's Box Festival, and Denmark during the Roskilde Festival. Later that year, Kukl and Icelandic folk singer Megas (Magnús Þór Jónsson) formed a side project called Megakukl. After creating about 20 songs, which remain unreleased, they played several concerts in Iceland.

=== Holidays in Europe and split ===
Kukl released their second and final studio album, Holidays in Europe (The Naughty Nought), on Crass Records on January 24, 1986. Two video clips were produced, "Outward Flight (Psalm 323)" and "France (A Mutual Thrill)". In a manifesto published as a Crass Records press release to announce the album, the band said:

”The Naughty Nought” pertains to the insignificance of the individual as being nothing but a numb number in a computer game of loss/profit good/evil black/white binary pairs. You are taken from Quintessence to the four elements from the Holy Trinity to duality and then from monistism to the naughty nought. In this process the music breaks the scale by thundering trumpets and pouring vials of wrath together with subtle musical poetry. The naughty nought is the source of all creative energy and is manifested through whirling cyclonic motion from the very shatters of matter to the spiralling galaxies. By contemplating the kinetic aspect of this naughty ality you gain your former potency as the master and creator without mutilating your fellow beings.”

Later that year, the band was close to an end, as different members pursued various projects. Guðlaugur and Björk formed the Elgar Sisters, a group which featured musicians from Kukl (with the exception of Einar Ørn) and collaborators Hilmar Örn Hilmarsson and Þorsteinn Magnússon. This ensemble recorded 11 songs in 1986 and disbanded thereafter.

In the summer of 1986, Einar Ørn returned from England with two projects: the creation of a new record label, Smekkleysa/Bad Taste, and a new band, Sykurmolarnir, later translated as The Sugarcubes. As Kukl disbanded, the only members who did not continue with the new project were Mogensen and Guðlaugur. The birth of the new band coincided with the June 8, 1986 birth of Björk's son Sindri Eldon Þórsson (fathered by Medúsa guitarist Þór Eldon Jónsson).

=== Later projects ===
Björk, Einar Örn, Melax and Sigtryggur formed the Sugarcubes in 1986 with bassist Bragi Ólafsson and guitarist Friðrik Erlingsson (replaced by Þór Eldon). Melax was later replaced by Margrét Örnólfsdóttir.

Melax later formed Exem with Þorri Jóhannsson of Inferno 5, releasing the album Kjöttromman in 1995 on Smekkleysa.

After Kukl disbanded, Guðlaugur collaborated with renowned Icelandic and international artists and has performed solo guitar concerts in Iceland. As a polytechnic engineer in practice and inventor, he has also combined his music work with scientific projects and delved into quantum physics, thermoelectricity and navigational systems.

Mogensen worked for recording and video studios and joined Inferno 5, a multimedia ensemble founded by Þorri Jóhannsson. He was asked to play bass for Killing Joke and rehearsed with them in England before Paul Raven rejoined that band. He played bass on several tracks on Exem's Kjöttromman. He later worked as a broadcast supervisor at the SkjárEinn TV station. In 2024, he released an album entitled Fluid Time with Sigtryggur Baldursson, as part of a new project, Paddan.

== Discography ==
=== Studio albums ===
- The Eye (1984, Crass Records)
- Holidays in Europe (The Naughty Nought) (1986, Crass Records)

=== Singles ===
- "Söngull" (1983, Gramm)

=== Live albums ===
- Kukl á Paris 14.9.84 (1985, V.I.S.A.)

=== Compilation appearances ===
- "Dismembered" on V.I.S.A. Présente (1985, Bondage Records/V.I.S.A.)
- "Man on the Cross" on Geyser - Anthology of the Icelandic Independent Music Scene of the Eighties (1987, Enigma Records)
- "Seagull" on Björk's Audiobiography cassette (1998, self-released)
- "Fuglar" on Björk's Family Tree box set (2002, One Little Indian Records)

== See also ==
- Music of Iceland
