= Helno =

French Music Artist

Noël Rota (December 25, 1963 – January 22, 1993), better known by his stage name Helno, was a French singer and member of the alternative rock bands Lucrate Milk, Bérurier Noir, and Les Négresses Vertes.

== Early life ==
Rota was born in the eastern Paris commune of Montreuil, Seine-Saint-Denis, on December 25, 1963. He is of Italian heritage. His great-uncle was Charles Michels, shot by the Nazis in 1941.

== Career ==
He started his musical career in the early 1980s as a member of Lucrate Milk (1981-1984), then Bérurier Noir, singing backup vocals on some tracks on stage.

Rota played the role of a punk in the 1984 film The Case of the Morituri Divisions (French: L'Affaire des divisions Morituri), directed by F. J. Ossang.

In 1987, he founded his own group, Les Négresses Vertes. The group enjoyed success, playing at the Olympia and abroad, particularly in England, along with Los Angeles, Beirut and Tokyo.

He said: "I have lots of friends who have committed suicide. I can name a bunch of people we have known at the Halles and are gone. Like in my neighbourhood; childhood friends, I haven't got a lot left. AIDS, suicides, overdoses... This is what you have when you lift the curtain of a small town, quiet. I often think that if hell exists, it is here on Earth. We're right into it. Every human being has the sensitivity to want to fuck up."

Rota died at age 29 on January 21, 1993. He died from a heroin overdose and was found in his mother's apartment, three hours after participating in the recording of the show Taratata. He was buried in the Cimetière Parisien de Pantin.

His twin brother, Ritier Rota, dedicated a tribute album, À Ta Santé Mon Frère! (Cheers, brother), to him in 2002.

His friend the singer Manu Chao, dedicated a song to him, "Helno Est Mort," on his album Sibérie m'était contéee.
