= Áskell Másson =

Icelandic composer

Áskell Másson (born 21 November 1953) is an Icelandic composer. He is one of the leading Icelandic composers of his generation, and has gained international recognition in particular for his percussion works as well as symphonic compositions.

== Career ==
Áskell Másson was born in Reykjavík, Iceland, and began clarinet lessons at the age of 8. After training at the Reykjavik College of Music, he continued his studies in London with Patrick Savill (harmony and counterpoint) and James Blades (percussion). In 1972 he became a composer and instrumentalist with the ballet of the National Theater in Reykjavik. From 1978 to 1983 he was a producer at the Music Department of the Iceland State Radio, after which he has devoted himself fully to composition. He was Secretary General of the Society of Icelandic Composers 1983–85, and President of the Performing Rights Society (STEF) from 1989 to 1999.

Másson first received international attention at the age of 26 with his Clarinet Concerto, written for Einar Jóhannesson, then principal clarinet of the Iceland Symphony Orchestra. The work was featured at the International Rostrum of Composers in Paris in 1980. Since then, his works have been performed by leading ensembles including the New York Philharmonic, Cleveland Orchestra, Toronto Symphony Orchestra, BBC Symphony Orchestra, Orchestre Philharmonique de Radio Paris, Vienna Radio Symphony Orchestra, Residenz Orchest Den Haag, New Juillard Ensemble, Ensemble Intercontemporain and the Swedish percussion ensemble, Kroumata.

Másson is primarily known worldwide for his percussion music. Among his most widely played works are Prím (Prime) for snare drum, written for the Danish percussionist Gert Mortensen in 1984, and also widely performed by Evelyn Glennie. According to the composer, Prím is based on a rhythmic pattern which the first fifteen of the prime numbers give, when using 32nd-part notes as a basic unit. Another key early work is the Konzertstück for snare drum and orchestra (1982) which has also been widely performed, including by the New York Philhamonic with Evelyn Glennie in 2000.

Másson is a remarkably productive composer and his works to date include the opera The Ice Palace (1983–87, not yet performed), the oratorio Cecilia (2006–8), three symphonies, sixteen concertos, and numerous works for chamber ensemble and orchestra. He has worked with internationally renowned soloists such as Roger Woodward, Evelyn Glennie, Benny Sluchin, Gert Mortensen, and Christian Lindberg. He is a two-time winner of the Icelandic Music Awards (composition of the year): in 2006 for his Violin Concerto, and in 2008 for the percussion concerto ORA.

His works have been published by Editions BIM, and the Iceland Music Information Center.

== Selected compositions ==
- Clarinet Concerto (1980)
- Konzertstück for snare drum and orchestra (1982)
- Viola Concerto (1983)
- Prím for snare drum (1984)
- Piano Concerto (1985)
- The Ice Palace, opera (1983–1987; based on novel by Tarjei Wesaas), not yet performed.
- Marimba Concerto (1987)
- Sinfonia Trilogia (Hyr; Rá; Hvel; 1992)
- Chamber Symphony (1997)
- Percussion Concerto (2000)
- Violin Concerto (2001)
- Kim for snare drum (2001)
- Söngvar um vorið (Songs of Spring), song cycle for soprano and orchestra (2001)
- Cecilia, oratorio (libretto by Thor Vilhjálmsson, 2006–2008)
- Horn Concerto (2008)
- ORA, concerto for 6 percussionists and orchestra (2008)
- B2B for snare drum (2010)
- Symphony no. 3 (2012)
- Gullský (Golden Clouds), concerto for flute and orchestra (2014)
- Silfurfljót (Silverstream), concerto for clarinet and orchestra (2014)

== Selected recordings ==
- Trio; Prím; Clarinet Concerto, etc. Einar Jóhannesson, Iceland Symphony Orchestra, cond. Páll P. Pálsson, et al. Gramm, 1988.
- Prím. On Drumming, Evelyn Glennie, percussion. Catalyst Records, 1996.
- Til lífsins. Percussion works performed by Áskell Másson et al. Smekkleysa, 1998.
- Chamber Symphony; Elja; Ymni, Maes Howe. Caput Ensemble, cond. Joel Sachs. Naxos, 2014.
- Music for Clarinet. Einar Jóhannesson et al. Naxos, 2015.
