= Fernand Grenier (French politician) =

French communist politician

Fernand Grenier (9 July 1901 – 12 August 1992) was a French communist politician.

== Biography ==
Fernand Grenier was born in July of 1901 in Tourcoing, Haust-de-France, to working class parents. He served as a politician in the French Communist party beginning in 1922. He continued to serve as a politician in different positions until his death in August of 1992.

=== In the Third Republic ===
Grenier joined the French Communist Party (PCF) shortly after the Tours Congress, in 1922, and became secretary of the Halluin section of the Jeunesse Communiste (JC). In November 1924, he trained at the “Leninist school” in Bobigny, together with Jacques Duclos, and stood out for his ability to write. He wrote for both the union and political newspapers. Promoted to assume responsibilities in the Northern region of the PCF in 1926, he was sentenced to prison for 1.5 years and for "provoking soldiers to disobedience" after an article was published in L'Avant-Garde, the newspaper of the JC.

Suspected of Trotskyism in 1930 because of his friendship with Albert Cornette, secretary of the Confédération générale du travail unitaire (CGTU), he lived a brief period of misfortune until 1932 when he resumed responsibilities in the North, then as a permanent member of the Central Committee, in Paris, where he was responsible for directing the Association of Friends of the Soviet Union (AUS), a position he held until 1939. In 1933 he spent a month in the USSR. In 1936, the association had 70,000 members and its magazine Russie d'aujourd'hui had a circulation of 130,000 copies.

In 1935, Grenier was responsible for the reconquest of the city of Saint-Denis, then in the Seine department, whose mayor, Jacques Doriot, had just been excluded from the Party. In the legislative elections of April–May 1936, Doriot was re-elected with a lead of 700 votes. After Doriot had resigned his mandate as deputy, Grenier stood in the partial legislative elections of August 1, 1937, and was elected deputy for Saint-Denis, defeating Doriot's replacement. In the Chamber of Deputies he was part of the Foreign Affairs Commission and the Final Accounts and Economy Commission.

=== Second World War ===
Mobilized in September 1939 he was demobilized near Annecy. Along with other communist deputies, he was stripped of his parliamentary mandate on January 21, 1940, and subsequently, of his mandate as municipal councilor of Saint-Denis in February 1940.

After having had difficulties in resuming contact with the clandestine apparatus of the party, he was chosen to represent the Central Committee during the first contacts with the envoys of Free France. He then met Colonel Rémy on November 25, 1942, and with him arrived in England in January 1943 carrying a letter from the CC of the Communist Party and another from Charles Tillon, leader of the Francs-Tireurs et Partisans (FTPF). He spoke for the first time on the BBC on January 15, 1943. From then he represented the communists before the various successive bodies of Free France, but in September 1943 he could not accept a position as commissioner of the French Committee of National Liberation (CFLN) which was proposed by de Gaulle without the approval of Jacques Duclos, then the party's clandestine leader in occupied France. The Communist Party presented demands for the participation of communists in the provisional government. On April 4, 1944, a compromise was reached with the appointment of two communist commissioners, François Billoux as State Commissioner and Grenier as Air Commissioner.

Following the amendment presented by Grenier on March 24, 1944, at the Provisional Consultative Assembly of Algiers, the right to vote for women was established in France with article 17 that states "Women are voters and eligible under the same conditions as men".

=== Post-war and later career ===
Grenier represented the PCF in the Provisional Consultative Assembly until October 1945, when he was re-elected deputy for the Seine in the Constituent Assembly, a deputy seat he held until 1968. He was part of the central committee of the PCF until May 1964. In September 1950, together with Denise Ginollin, he went to the Ministry of the Interior to ask Eugène Thomas for clarification about the ban on certain books and magazines from the USSR as well as the newspaper of the Unified Socialists of Catalonia, Lluita.

As a member of the National Committee Franco-USSR Association, Grenier remained pro-Soviet until the end of his life. He died in Saint-Denis and was buried at the Père-Lachaise Cemetery.
