= Assassination of Karl Hotz =

1941 murder of German military officer

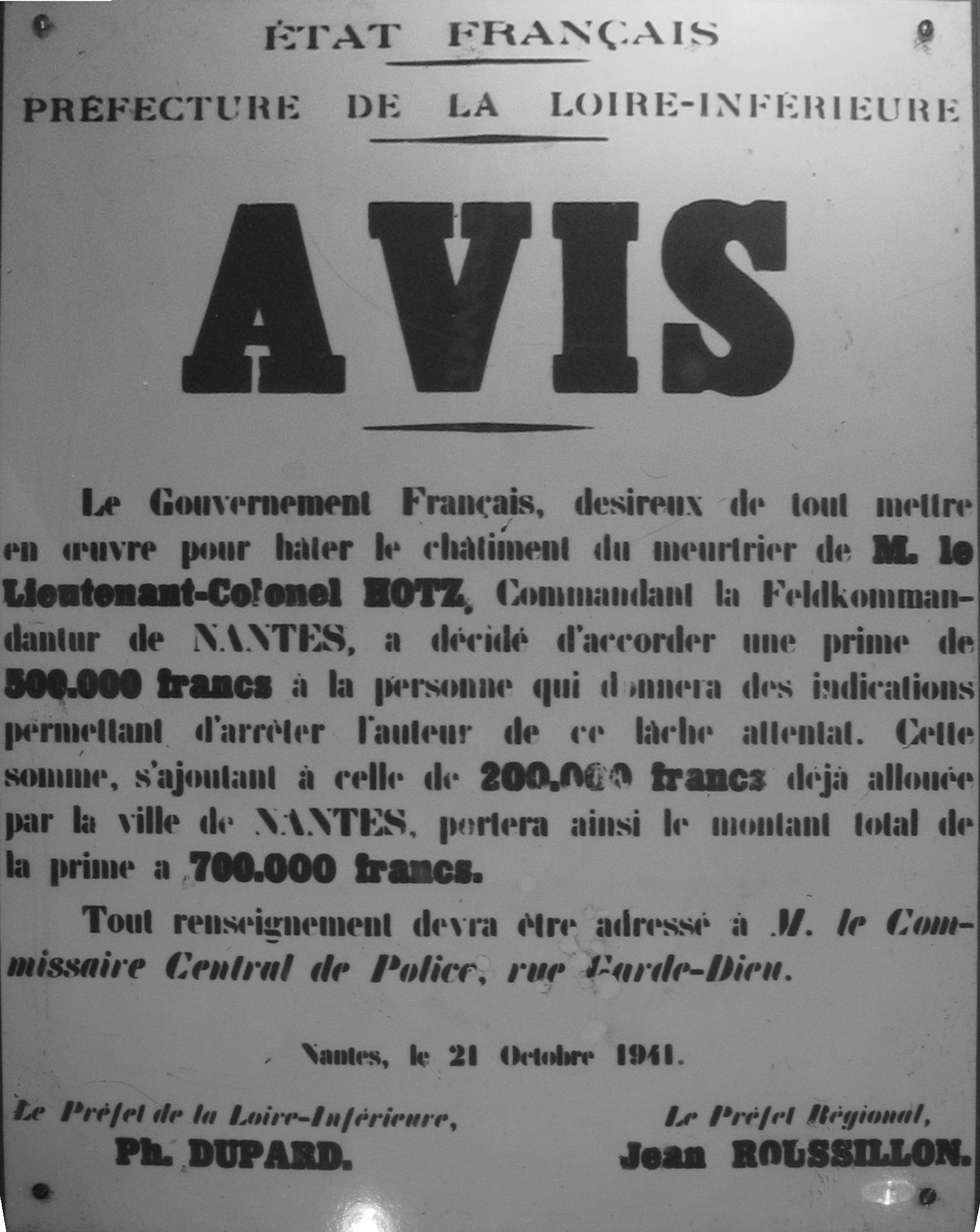
Wanted notice

Karl Hotz (29 April 1877 – 20 October 1941) was a Lt. Colonel in the German military during World War II. With the occupation of France by Nazi Germany in June 1940, Hotz became the military governor of the German military administration in Nantes. He was assassinated in Nantes by French communists on 20 October 1941, one of the first German soldiers killed by the French Resistance. His assassination led to a massive manhunt for his killers and the retaliatory execution of 48 French citizens by the Germans. Relations between the German occupiers and French officials in Nantes had been cooperative until the executions which contributed to worsening relationships between the French and their German occupiers.

== Early life ==
Hotz was born in 1877 in Wertheim am Main. He became an army officer and served in Metz where he learned to speak French. He lived in Nantes from 1930 to 1933 as head of a project to build an underground canal system beneath the city. On his return to Nantes as military governor in 1940, he was described by a French employee as "an old man, dry, short, dressed in an artillery officer's uniform" with "a broad smile and kindly expression." Hotz was a music lover and was invited to play the trumpet and piano at the homes of prominent citizens of Nantes and its region.

== Background ==
The German occupation forces in France, under General Otto von Stülpnagel, encountered little violent opposition after the armistice between France and Germany on 22 June 1940 until the 22 June 1941 German invasion of the Soviet Union. The Soviet Union, an ostensible ally of Nazi Germany, had instructed the French Communist Party (Parti Communiste Français, PCF) to take no action against the German occupying power. With the invasion of the Soviet Union, the French communists changed course and embarked on a "campaign of sabotage and assassination."

On 13 August 1941, a group of 100 young people formed by the PCF youth wing walked out of the Strasbourg – Saint-Denis station singing la Marseillaise under the tricolor flag. French police intervened and German soldiers opened fire. Samuel Tyszelman was hit in the leg. Henri Gautherot (b. 1920) fled but was caught in the nearby Boulevard Saint-Martin. Tyszelman and Gautherot were executed on 19 August. Two days later, on August 21, 1941, the first assassination of a German military officer followed as revenge. The naval management assistant Alfons Moser was shot in the Barbès - Rochechouart metro station by the communist party member Pierre "Frédo" Georges (1919–1944) in Paris, accompanied by Gilbert Brustlein (1919–2009). In retaliation, six French prisoners were convicted, sentenced to death and executed by a newly constituted French special court under pressure from the German occupying forces.

On 22 August, the Germans in Paris announced that all prisoners in French jails because of offenses to the Germans would be regarded as hostages and could be executed in response to resistance to the German occupation. The announcement blamed the attacks on "Jewish Bolsheviks." On 3 September, unknown persons shot and killed Sergeant Ernst Hoffman in Paris. The German army executed three communist prisoners in response. German leader Adolf Hitler was dissatisfied with the "limited executions" and ordered more "drastic measures" with 50 to 100 executions for each assassination of a German soldier. On 15 September, German officer Wilhelm Scheben was shot and killed in Paris. In retaliation, the Germans executed twelve hostages on September 19. The Germans attempted to execute only hostages who had committed sabotage or other serious crimes but if they ran short of hostages they executed people convicted of minor offenses. Six of those executed had been convicted of minor crimes.

About 15 October the French communists extended their attacks on German military personnel to the provinces. The leaders of the self-named "Battalions of Youth," Georges and Albert Ouzoulias, sent Gilbert Brustlein and Guico Spartaco from Paris to Nantes.

== Assassination ==
At 7:30 a.m. on 20 October 1941, Hotz and Captain Wilhelm Sieger were walking across the cathedral square in Nantes en route to their offices when the two assassins, Brustlein and Spartaco, opened fire on them. Brustlein fired three shots into the back of Hotz who died immediately; Spartaco's pistol jammed and Sieger was unharmed. The two ran from the scene into the maze of streets surrounding the square and were not apprehended. The killing of Hotz was random; at the time the assassins did not know that they killed the commander of the German occupiers of Nantes. Fifty years later Brustlein said that the assassination was an "act of war" and that it ignited the resistance in western France.

The immediate reaction of the French authorities in Nantes was to try to placate the Germans. The French had had good relations with Hotz. The mayor of Nantes and the prefect of the province presented their condolences. The Germans told them that the response to the assassination would be decided by their superiors in Paris and Berlin. The French in Nantes issued an appeal to the citizenry to find Hotz's assassins and condemned the "odious crime." The newspaper blamed the killing on agents of London and Moscow, complimented Hotz on his fairness, and repeated the appeal to find the assassins.

== German reprisals ==
Hitler learned of Hotz's assassination at 10:30 a.m. He advocated the execution of 100 to 150 hostages, a curfew in western France, and a one million franc reward for information leading to the capture of the killers. Hitler blamed the British for the assassination. The responsibility for carrying out Hitler's wishes fell on Otto von Stülpnagel, based in Paris and the military commander of occupied France. Stülpnagel argued for a three-day delay in executing the hostages to allow time to catch the killers. Hitler decreed that fifty hostages would be executed immediately and 50 more if the killers were not caught in two days. The situation was complicated when another communist assassin killed a civilian working for the German military in Bordeaux on 21 October.

French authorities drew up the list from men already in internee and prison camps, using it as an opportunity to rid France of communists. Thirty of the fifty chosen were communists; the other twenty were a varied group, including one man whose offense had been not surrendering his hunting rifle to the Germans. Last minute negotiations between the French and Germans reduced the list to 48. On October 22 the 48 men were executed by the German military and the Schutzstaffel (SS). Their names were published in newspapers the following day. Those executed included Guy Môquet, Charles Michels and Jean-Pierre Timbaud.

French authorities and private citizens tried to persuade the Germans to call off the execution of 50 additional men for the assassination of Hotz (and another 50 in Bordeaux for the assassination there) as had been ordered by Hitler. Stülpnagel agreed and sent a message to Berlin: "the attacks were carried out by small terror attacks and English soldiers or spies who move from place to place;...the majority of Frenchmen do not support them...shooting hostages only embitters the people and makes future rapprochement more difficult...I personally have warned against Polish methods in France." ("Polish methods" referred to widespread German massacres in Poland.)

Exiled French leader Charles de Gaulle weighed in on October 23 advising the French in a BBC radio broadcast not to kill Germans because the Germans could retaliate with massacres. He promised to attack the Germans in France when it became possible. On October 28, Hitler suspended the execution of the additional hostages.

=== The executions (October 22, 1941) ===
In Châteaubriant and Nantes, hostages in each of the three detention sites were gathered early in the afternoon without being formally informed of the reason. French Catholic priests assigned to provide moral support were the ones to notify them of their fate. According to the priests’ accounts, their very presence in the room was enough for the hostages to understand their impending execution. The priests collected letters (later censored) and personal items to pass on to families.

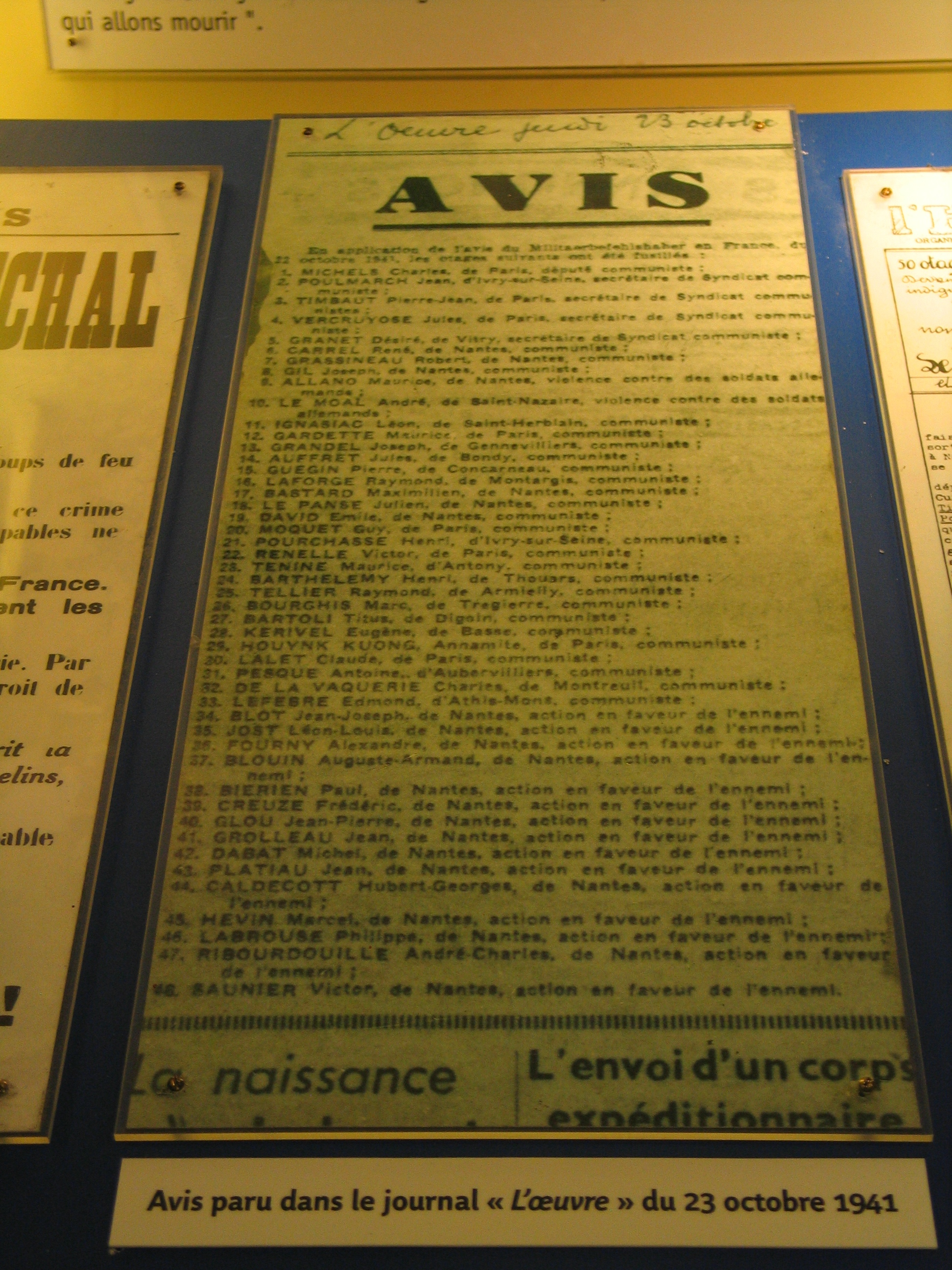
Notice published in L'Œuvre on October 23, 1941: list of the 48 people shot on October 22, 1941.

The priests were not permitted to accompany the condemned to the execution sites, although German military chaplains were present.

The bodies were buried anonymously in different cemeteries. By dispersing the corpses, the Germans aimed to prevent the creation of pilgrimage sites that could fuel hostility against them. However, this dispersion did not stop the graves from being adorned with flowers from the very first days and throughout the war.

In Paris, the executions were carried out more swiftly. Families of the executed learned of their deaths through the publication of the list of 48 names in the press on the morning of October 23.

==== Arrival at Choisel Camp ====
"Mr. Sub-Prefect was among the condemned, informing them of the horrific fate awaiting them and urging them to write farewell letters to their families without delay. It was under these circumstances that the priest arrived at the barracks entrance. In front of the barracks stood a line of German soldiers with weapons at the ready. Around the barracks, a cordon of French gendarmes was stationed at intervals of about six meters. Inside, the condemned were all writing their letters—some seated at the few benches in the room, others leaning against the barrack walls as they wrote..."

==== Châteaubriant: The Sablière Quarry ====
At Choisel Camp, the hostages gathered in Barrack 6 were assisted by Father Moyon, the priest of Béré (a working-class area of Châteaubriant; the town's main priest had refused to assist communists). At 2:00 PM, three German trucks arrived to collect them. They were taken to the Sablière Quarry on the outskirts of Châteaubriant. They were executed in three groups of nine at 3:50, 4:00, and 4:10 PM.

Among them was Guy Môquet, the youngest of the executed at 17 years old. He refused to let his comrades intercede on his behalf, saying, "I am as much a communist as you are," to Dr. Ténine. All refused blindfolds or restraints and died singing "La Marseillaise".

Other notable individuals among the executed included Charles Michels, a communist deputy from Paris's 15th arrondissement, and Jean-Pierre Timbaud, secretary of the Parisian CGT metalworkers' federation. Also present were two Trotskyists: Marc Bourhis and Pierre Guéguin, the mayor of Concarneau, who had broken with the French Communist Party after the Molotov-Ribbentrop Pact.

That evening, the bodies were taken to the town's château, which housed the sub-prefecture and placed haphazardly in a room. The following evening, they were placed in coffins and buried in groups of three across the cemeteries of nine nearby communes, including Moisdon-la-Rivière (Raymond Laforge), Saint-Aubin-des-Châteaux (Jean-Pierre Timbaud), Petit-Auverné (Guy Môquet), and Villepot.

==== Nantes: The Bêle Firing Range ====
At Lafayette Prison, the hostages were held in individual cells and not informed of events. When summoned, they were unaware of their fate. Assisted by Father Fontaine, the prison chaplain, they were taken to the Bêle firing range and executed in four groups of three or four. The interval between the first and last executions was 40 minutes.

At Rochettes Prison, the hostages were assisted by Father Théon, a professor at Saint-Stanislas College. They were the last to be taken to the Bêle grounds. The bodies were buried in cemeteries in three communes southeast of Nantes: Basse-Goulaine, Haute-Goulaine, and Saint-Julien-de-Concelles.

==== Paris: Fort of Mont-Valérien ====
Here, events proceeded hastily. Called at around 2:30 PM, the hostages were taken directly to Mont-Valérien, where they were briefly assisted by Father Stock. They had just enough time to write farewell letters before being executed together at 3:30 PM.

=== List of the Executed on October 22, 1941 ===
The list of the executed was published in the press on October 23, 1941, under the title "NOTICE." It provided each hostage's name, surname, place of origin, and the reason for arrest or conviction. The hostages were numbered from 1 to 48 in an order reflecting the reasons for their condemnation, though inconsistently.

Five categories of reasons were listed:

1. Communist deputy (1 case);
2. Secretary of a "Communist Union" (4 cases);
3. Communist (26 cases);
4. Violence against German soldiers (2 cases);
5. Actions aiding the enemy (15 cases).

The lists below are presented alphabetically, followed by brief biographical details (age, profession, roles, political activities, and dates of arrest or trial).

Those executed at Châteaubriant

27 people shot at the Sablière quarry

- Auffret Jules, 39, gas worker, from Bondy, Communist general councillor for the Seine.
- Barthélémy Henri, 58, from Thouars, retired from the Société nationale des chemins de fer français (SNCF), Communist activist.
- Bartoli Titus, 58, from Digoin, honorary schoolteacher, Communist activist.
- Bastard Maximilien, 21, from Nantes, boilermaker, communist activist.
- Bourhis Marc, 44, from Trégunc, teacher, Trotskyist communist activist.
- David Émile, 19, from Nantes, dental mechanic, Communist militant.
- Delavacquerie Charles, 19, from Montreuil, printer, communist activist.
- Gardette Maurice, 49, from Paris, craftsman turner, Communist general councillor for the Seine.
- Granet Désiré, 37, from Vitry-sur-Seine, General Secretary of the General Confederation of Labour.
- Grandel Jean, 50, PTT employee, Communist mayor of Gennevilliers, Communist general councillor for the Seine, secretary of the CGT postal federation.
- Guéguin Pierre, 45, from Concarneau, teacher, Communist mayor of Concarneau and general councillor of Finistère, critical Communist: refused to accept the Molotov–Ribbentrop Pact and broke with the PCF, then joined the Trotskyists.
- Huỳnh Khương An known as "Luisne", 29, from Paris, teacher, communist activist.
- Kérivel Eugène, 50, from Basse-Indre, coastal captain (fisherman), Communist activist.
- Laforge Raymond, 43, from Montargis, primary school teacher, Communist activist.
- Lalet Claude, 21, from Paris, student, leader of the Jeunesses Communistes.
- Lefebvre Edmond, 38, from Athis-Mons, metalworker, communist activist.
- Le Panse Julien, 34, from Nantes, house painter, Communist activist.
- Michels Charles, 38, from Paris, shoe worker, Communist deputy for the Seine, secretary of the CGT leather and skins federation.
- Môquet Guy, 17, from Paris, student, Communist activist, son of the Seine deputy Prosper Môquet.
- Pesqué Antoine, 55, from Aubervilliers, medical doctor, communist activist.
- Poulmarc'h Jean, 31, from Ivry-sur-Seine, general secretary of the CGT chemicals federation, Communist militant.
- Pourchasse Henri, 34, from Ivry-sur-Seine, employee of the prefecture, leader of the CGT railway workers' federation, Communist militant.
- Renelle Victor, 42, from Paris, chemical engineer, Communist activist, founder of the Chemical Industry Technicians' Union.
- Tellier Raymond, 44, from Amilly, printer, communist activist.
- Ténine Maurice, 34, from Antony, medical doctor, communist activist.
- Timbaud Jean-Pierre, 31, from Paris, bronze caster, general secretary of the CGT metallurgy federation, Communist militant.
- Vercruysse Jules, 48, from Paris, textile worker, General Secretary of the CGT Textile Federation, Communist militant.
Those executed in Nantes

16 people shot at the Bêle firing range in Nantes.

- Allano Maurice, 21, from Nantes, suspected of resistance (violence against a German soldier).
- Birien Paul, 50, from Nantes, commercial traveller, war veteran, suspected of encouraging prisoner-of-war escapes (tried on July 16, 1941).
- Blot Joseph, 50, from Nantes, veteran, vice-president of the "marins combattants", suspected of encouraging prisoner-of-war escapes (tried on July 16, 1941).
- Blouin Auguste, 57, from Nantes, commercial traveller, war veteran, suspected of encouraging prisoner-of-war escapes (tried on July 16, 1941).
- Carrel René, 20 years old, from Nantes, communist activist, suspected of resistance.
- Creusé Frédéric, 20, from Nantes, suspected Resistance fighter, prisoner at Les Rochettes (tried on August 8, 1941).
- Dabat Michel, 20 years old, from Nantes, Resistance action: with Christian de Mondragon, installs a French flag at the top of one of the cathedral's towers, prisoner at the Rochettes prison (tried on August 8, 1941).
- Fourny Alexandre, 43, from Nantes, lawyer, general councillor, former deputy mayor of Nantes, war veteran, Knight of the Legion of Honour, suspected of promoting prisoner-of-war escapes (tried on July 16, 1941).
- Gil Joseph, 19, from Nantes, communist activist, suspected of resistance.
- Glou Jean-Pierre, 19, from Nantes, suspected of resistance (tried on August 8, 1941).
- Grassineau Robert, 34, from Nantes, Communist, suspected of resistance.
- Grolleau Jean, 21, from Nantes, suspected of resistance.
- Ignasiak Léon, 22, from Saint-Herblain, Communist, suspected of resistance.
- Jost Léon, 57, director of manufacturing and personnel at the LU factory in Nantes, president of the Loire-Inférieure veterans' and war victims' associations, Commander of the Legion of Honour, suspected of promoting prisoner-of-war escapes (tried on July 16, 1941).
- Le Moal André, 17, from Saint-Nazaire, violence against German soldiers, suspected of resistance.
- Platiau Jean, 20, from Nantes, suspected of resistance, prisoner at Les Rochettes (tried on August 8, 1941).
Those executed at Mont-Valérien

5 people shot at the Mont-Valérien fort.

- Caldecott Hubert, 35, from Nantes, member of a Resistance network.
- Hévin Marcel, 35, from Nantes, member of a Resistance network.
- Labrousse Philippe, 32, from Saint-Nazaire, member of a Resistance network.
- Ribourdouille André-Charles, from Nantes.
- Saunier Victor, from Nantes.

=== Reactions ===
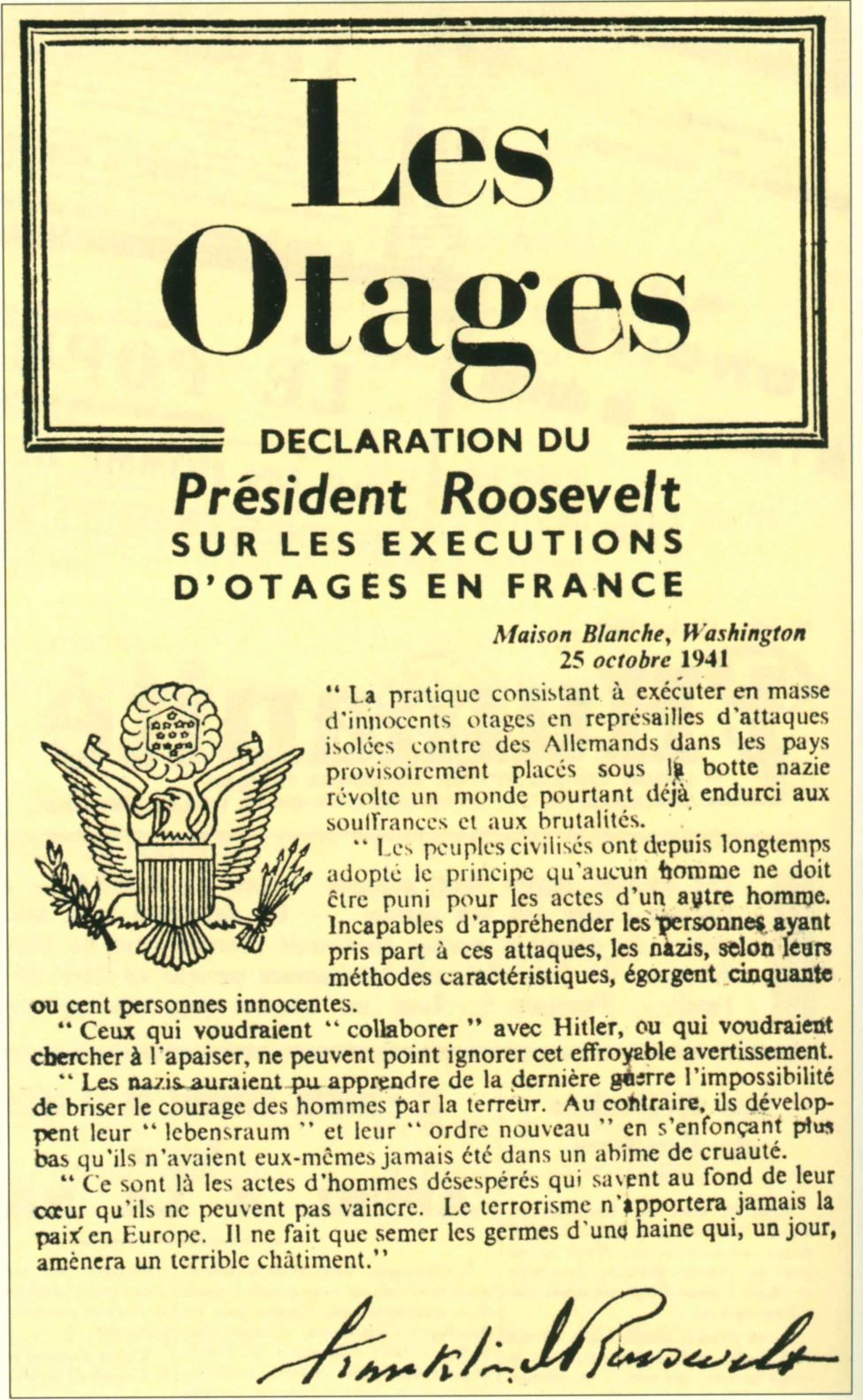
American propaganda leaflet dropped after the execution of the Châteaubriant hostages; copy owned by the Musée de la Résistance Nationale de Champigny.

The execution of 48 hostages on October 22, followed by the execution of 50 hostages in Martignas-sur-Jalle (Bordeaux) on October 24, caused a massive wave of emotion in France and worldwide.

On October 25, General de Gaulle declared on London radio:

"By executing our martyrs, the enemy thought they would frighten France. France will show them that it is not afraid [...] I invite all French men and women to cease all activity and remain still, wherever they may be, on Friday, October 31, from 4:00 to 4:05 [...]" A symbolic five-minute strike was organized across France. On November 11, de Gaulle awarded the city of Nantes the title Compagnon de la Libération.

A leaflet dated October 25 was dropped across France between October 30 and November 4, 1941. On one side, it featured Winston Churchill's declaration regarding the hostages; on the other, Franklin Roosevelt's statement. This was especially significant as the United States had not yet entered the war.

=== After the Liberation ===
After Liberation, the hostages were honored with national funerals, and their families were allowed to bury them as they wished. Some families chose not to move the bodies, such as Jean-Pierre Timbaud's family, who left him in Saint-Aubin-des-Châteaux. In 1945, the new boulevard created on the filled-in bed of the Erdre River in Nantes was named Cours des 50-Otages, and a monument to the Fifty Hostages was inaugurated in 1952 at its end.

== Impact ==
Stülpnagel continued to disagree with Berlin's policy of mass executions of hostages in retaliation for anti-German acts. German reprisals, he believed "alienated workers, provoked resistance, and forced Germany to send more security forces..." On 17 February 1942, at his request, he was relieved of his duties.

In author Gildea's view, the Hotz assassination resulted in "the whip hand on the German side passed from the military authorities who were tough but fair to the secret police who were interested only in repression." Neumaier contests that opinion by stating that the methods of the German military and the SS were essentially the same.

Gildea disagrees with the later opinion that the assassination of Hotz and the German reprisals ignited French resistance to the German occupation. Rather, he says that the incident "served only to illustrate the madness of armed resistance and the benefits of avoiding reasons to upset the Germans." Laub says that the events of late 1941 caused the French to believe that "neither collaboration nor resistance made sense." Their "unenthusiastic collaboration" with the Germans turned to "sullen acquiescence."
