= Enpocket =

- Type: Privately held company
- Industry: Marketing
- Founded: 2001 in Boston
- Defunct: 2007
- Fate: Acquired
- Successor: Nokia and Movement Digital
- Headquarters: Boston, Massachusetts, United States
- Area served: Worldwide
- Products: Mobile marketing, advertising platform for mobile phones
- Website: www.enpocket.com Archived November 13, 2007, at the Wayback Machine

Enpocket was an American mobile media company providing mobile marketing and advertising services. It was headquartered in Boston and had operations in a number of countries.

The company provided three main advertising products which included Enpocket Platform, Enpocket Mechanics, and Enpocket Network, each provided different advertising capability on mobile platforms from the early 2000s.

== History ==
The company was founded in 2001, headquartered in Boston, Massachusetts.

Nokia acquired the company in 2007 and merged it into its Services division as Nokia Interactive Advertising.

In November 2009 the business unit was moved to Nokia's NAVTEQ subsidiary and renamed to NAVTEQ Media Solutions, while the creative services team left to form Movement Digital, a mobile marketing agency based in London.

== Products ==
The company's main products were:

- Enpocket Platform: a mobile campaign management and delivery system combining multi-modal mechanics, including SMS, MMS, WAP advertising, and video with predictive analytics
- Enpocket Mechanics: used by advertisers to lead consumers to a store, to sell tickets, to offer ring tones and wallpapers, to offer discount coupons, and to show video of a product in action
- Enpocket Network: provided brands to reach an audience on mobile devices
