= The Eye (KUKL album) =

Studio album by Kukl
- Released: September 1, 1984
- Recorded: January 1984
- Studio: Southern Studios
- Genre: Post-punk; no wave; experimental; gothic rock; noise rock
- Length: 27:15
- Label: Crass; One Little Indian
- Producer: Penny Rimbaud

Kukl chronology
| "Söngull" single (1983) | The Eye (1984) | Kukl á Paris 14.9.84 (1984) |

The Eye is the debut studio album by Icelandic post-punk band Kukl. It was released in September 1984 by Crass Records. The album peaked at No. 6 in the UK Independent Albums Chart.

A music video for the track "Anna" was released, directed by Tage Ammendrup.

The album has been reissued numerous times: in 1997 by Crass, and in 2002, 2004 and 2008 by One Little Indian.

== Production ==
The Eye was recorded at Southern Studios in January 1984. It was produced by Crass member Penny Rimbaud and engineered by Tony Cook. The cover art was designed by Dada Nana. It was named after Björk's favorite book, Story of the Eye by Georges Bataille (1928), an intense story about a young French couple involved in sexual perversions and violent behaviors. The album included "Dismembered", a new version of the band's first single, "Söngull" (1983), with most of the guitars replaced by pipes and bells.

== Critical reception ==
Professional ratings
Review scores
| Source | Rating |
|---|---|
| AllMusic | 4/5 stars |
| NME | 3/10 |
| Sounds | 5/5 stars |

In a 1984 review at Sounds magazine, David Tibet gave the album a perfect score, saying: "'The Eye' steps boldly out of the supposed confines that the Crass label is meant to impose...and drags the listener into a glacial world of confused emotion and shattered visions." He compared it to The Scream by Siouxsie and the Banshees, "primarily I suppose because of the howling vocals and decaying metal".

AllMusic praised the album, stating that "The Eye is a patently draining affair seemingly devoid of any coherent structure. Repeated spins, however, unearth a highly sophisticated aesthetic that borrows evenly from punk, noisecore, avant garde, and good old-fashioned indie. Although highly discordant and often atonal, it's a curiously engaging record, aided in part by Björk's darkly emotive vocals and the presiding, almost mythical, sense of impending lunacy. It may not be for everyone, but this is gutsy, non-conformist music as authored by one of the most passionate, intense bands in Iceland's esteemed history".

== Track listing ==
Side A
| No. | Title | Length |
|---|---|---|
| 1. | "Assassin" | 3:15 |
| 2. | "Anna" | 6:08 |
| 3. | "Open The Window And Let The Spirit Fly Free" | 2:35 |
| 4. | "Moonbath" | 2:06 |

Side B
| No. | Title | Length |
|---|---|---|
| 5. | "Dismembered" | 4:29 |
| 6. | "Seagull" | 3:04 |
| 7. | "The Spire" | 4:28 |
| 8. | "Handa Tjolla" | 1:27 |

== Personnel ==
Credits adapted from the album's liner notes.

Kukl

- Björk (credited as "Bjørk") – vocals, woodwinds
- Einar Örn Benediktsson (credited as "Einar Ørn") – vocals, metal winds
- Einar Arnaldur Melax (credited as "Melax") – pipe bells, harmonium, all other strings
- Guðlaugur Kristinn Óttarsson (credited as "God Krist") – electric strings
- Birgir Mogensen (credited as "Birgir") – bass
- Sigtryggur Baldursson (credited as "Trix") – drums

Additional personnel

- Tony Cook – engineering
- Dada Nana – artwork and design
