= Tony Cook (musician) =

American musician

Tony Cook was an American dance music record producer and former drummer for James Brown.

== Biography ==
James Brown discovered Tony Cook playing at a block party for the WRDW-AM radio station Brown owned in his childhood hometown of Augusta, Georgia. Cook was an Augusta native who began drumming in his early teens, learning full albums by the likes of Brown, Al Green, Rufus Thomas, Wilson Pickett and Kool & the Gang, and playing in backing bands for touring artists such as Geater Davis and Z.Z. Hill. “He sat in with us and he took for granted that we knew the songs,” Cook says of his first encounter with the legendary Godfather of Soul. “So we played, and from his expression [it seemed] he was a little bit surprised that we could play so well. We were just a bunch of kids. Maybe the oldest one of us was 17. I think I was 15.”

Cook finished high school and was gigging in and around Augusta with a local group called the Liberty Band when Brown and running partner Bobby Byrd were in attendance for a bill the group shared with comedian Clay Tyson. The Godfather had heard that Cook and company were the best outfit in town, and on the strength of their performance that night, hired the crew as his opening act in December 1975. In the early part of 1976, Brown began to retool the JBs and brought Cook aboard as his new drummer, a position the 18-year-old would hold off and on for the next thirty years.

The hiring came when Brown’s career was in decline. As work slowed, Cook joined Etta James’s band, opening for the Rolling Stones and supporting Taj Mahal, James Booker, and Willie Mabon at the 1978 Montreux Jazz Festival before returning to Brown later that year. He stayed with Brown for the next two years until receiving an offer from producer Frank Farian to bring his band Sky Train to Germany and back Jamaican-born vocalist Precious Wilson. After working with Farian, Cook moved to London and went independent, scoring a deal in 1981 with Osceola Records and producing the first Tony Cook and the Party People singles. The next year, he began working with the Halfmoon label, releasing “Do What You Wanna Do” and later, the seminal “On the Floor” and “On the Floor (Rock-It)” mixes by WBLS-FM DJs Timmy Regisford and Boyd Jarvis.

Cook’s initial tenure with James Brown came to an end in 1993, although he would return in 2005 and stay until Brown’s death on Christmas Day in 2006. Cook still performs with his band, Trunk-O-Funk. In June 2014 Tony Cook produced and recorded drums on a song "Robo-friend" by Russian alternative rock band 208 Talks of Angels.

=== The granddaddy of all house records ===
“On the Floor” found Cook successfully merging funk and disco, although that was not the original intent. The drummer-turned-producer was admittedly trying to score a hit, and to do so, chose to ride the other emerging genre of the day. “‘On the Floor’ was a rap record at first,” he reveals. “We put the tracks down in Atlanta, Georgia, then the record company struck a deal and got Timmy Regisford and Boyd Jarvis to mix it. They took the master and re-recorded a few things, added a few things, and came up with the mix that we ended up with. It was quite a bit different from what we put down in the beginning, but I was pleased with the results.”

“We didn’t know what to call it, but it definitely wasn’t a rap record anymore. It had more of a dance kind of thing going through it. And it had a little bit of techno to it. When we released it in 1984, the phrase ‘garage’ came out, then ‘house’ came out, and someone called it ‘The Granddaddy of all House Records’, so we knew we had something different and new.”

=== James Brown, Michael Jackson and Prince ===
Cook was Brown’s drummer during the historic 1983 concert with B.B. King at the Beverly Theater in Los Angeles, during which Prince and Michael Jackson made impromptu appearances on stage. “I don’t think he really knew who Prince was at the time,” Cook says of Brown, who first learned that Jackson was in attendance and called him up onstage. “He might have known Prince’s name, but he just didn’t put a face with it, or didn’t understand what Michael was talking about.”

“Michael said ‘Prince’ and Brown probably thought he was talking about another prince…a real prince. That wasn’t unusual. We’d go to gigs and anybody might show up.”

=== Back to Reality ===
In 2010, Stones Throw Records released Cook’s Back to Reality anthology, a collection of rare and unreleased funk, boogie, and proto-rap from the immediate post-disco era. Stones Throw founder, Chris “Peanut Butter Wolf” Manak, first learned of Cook when he found the "On the Floor" single in a New York City record store in the early 2000s.

"I was excited because it sounded like the missing to me, it seemed like the first house record. I loved playing it.”

== Discography ==
- Tony Cook at Discogs.com
