= Les Négresses Vertes =

French rock band

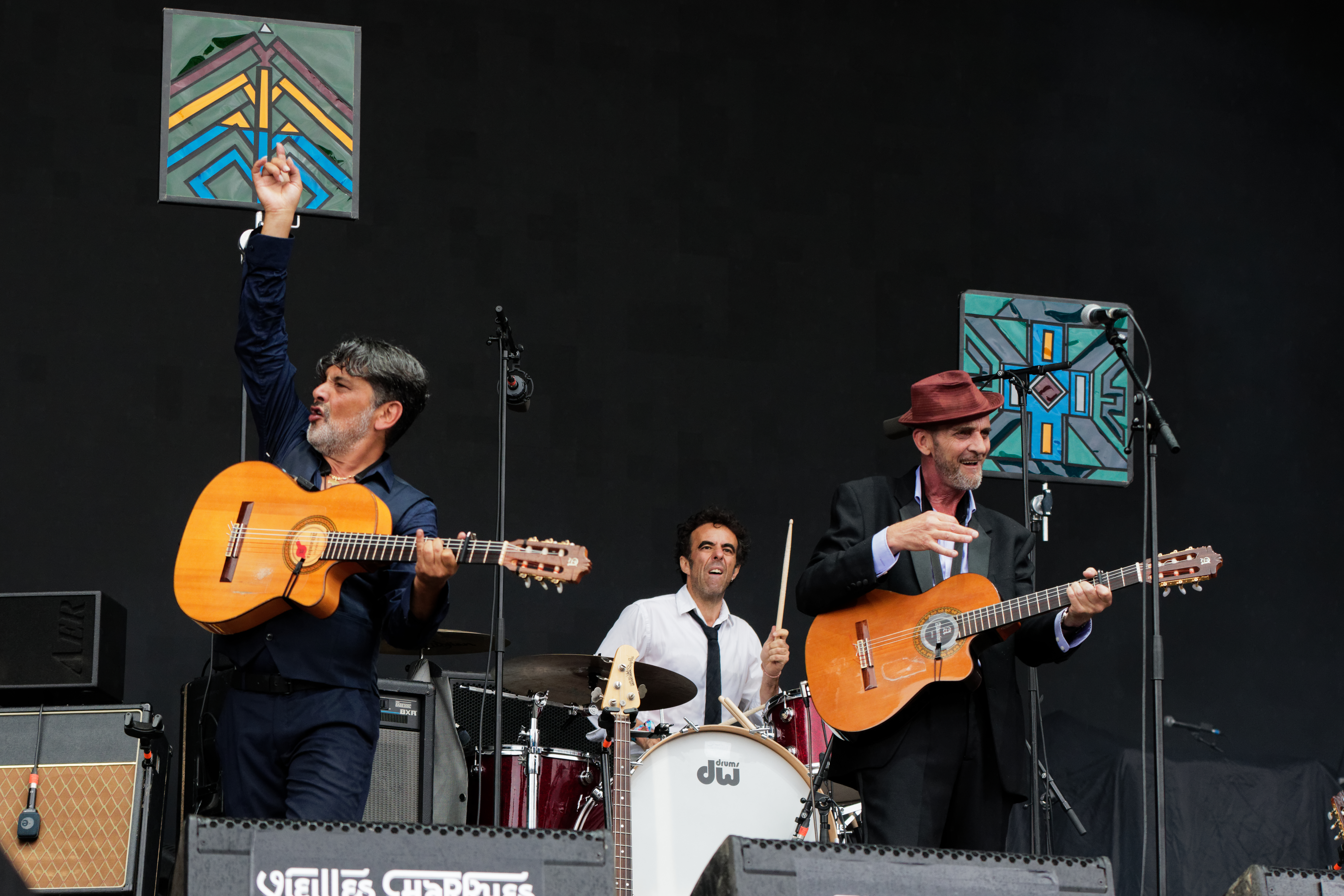
Les Négresses Vertes at Festival des Vieilles Charrues 2018.

Les Négresses Vertes ("The Green Negresses"), formed in 1987, is a French music group that combines world music and some aspects of alternative rock. Tracks often feature acoustic guitar and accordion, with some containing other traditional instruments such as piano and brass.

== History ==
Formed in 1987, Les Négresses Vertes arose from the alternative-music scene in Paris. The original line-up included singer Helno (also known as Helno Rota de Lourcqua, born Noël Rota), Jo Roz (also known as l'Ami Ro; real name Joe Ruffier des Aimes) (piano), Stéfane Mellino (guitar), Jean-Marie Paulus (bass), Gaby (drums), Matthias Canavese (accordion), Michel Ochowiak (trumpet), Abraham Sirinix (also known as Abraham Braham) (trombone), and Iza Mellino (backing vocals).

The original members were a group of friends, many of whom had not played their instruments before forming the band. The group's name translates as green negresses; and arose from abuse hurled at the members at one of the group's first concerts. The insult is a comparison to the kitsch art of Vladimir Tretchikoff. The group was initially signed to the independent Off the Track label and released the punk protest song "200 Ans D'Hypocrisie" in response to its home country's French Revolution bicentennial celebrations.

In 1989, they released their first album, Mlah, to good reviews in both France and the UK, where the single "Zobi La Mouche" just failed to reach the charts. The group toured and played the WOMAD festival, and also undertook a controversial tour of Lebanon in December 1991. Their second album, Famille Nombreuse, in 1991, featured new drummer Zé Verbalito.

In 1990, Les Négresses Vertes contributed the song "I Love Paris" to the Cole Porter tribute album Red Hot + Blue, which was produced by the Red Hot Organization. By this time, Helno was struggling with serious heroin addiction, impacting his playing and writing abilities. He died on 22 January 1993.

Several members left the band after Helno's death, but Les Négresses Vertes continued around the nucleus of Mellino, Canavese, Ochowiak, and Paulus. In 1995, the band released the album Zig-Zague, followed by the live album Green Bus. By 1999's Trabendo, the group had shifted to a dub-oriented lounge style.

== Discography ==
=== Albums ===
- Mlah (1988)
- Famille nombreuse (1991)
- An Aperitif (1994)
- Zig-zague (1994)
- Green Bus (1996), live
- Trabendo (1999)
- Acoustic Clubbing (2001)

=== Compilations ===
- 10 Remixes (’87–’93) (1993)
- Le Grand Déballage (2002)
- L'essentiel (2004)
- À l’Affiche (2006)

=== Singles ===
- Il (1989)
- Zobi La Mouche (1989)
- Voila L’ete (1989)
- "I Love Paris" (1990) (Tribute album Red Hot + Blue produced by the Red Hot Organization)
- Face à La Mer (1991)
- Famille Heureuse (1992)
- Hou! Mamma Mia (1992)
- Sous Le soleil de bodega (1992)
- Apres La pluie (1994)
- Mambo Show (1994)
- A Quoi Bon (1995)
- Easy Girls (1999)
- Leila (1999)
- Hasta Llegar (2000) (Promo CD; was never released)
- Spank / Abuela (2000)
