= Curver =

Icelandic artist/musician

Curver Thoroddsen is an Icelandic artist/musician, born in 1976. He is a member of the duo Ghostigital along with Einar Örn Benediktsson, a former member of The Sugarcubes. He created the remix of Sigur Rós's 18 sekúndur fyrir sólarupprás, renamed "180 sekúndur fyrir sólarupprás" on their 1998 remix album Von brigði. He resides in Reykjavik.

== Name change ==
Curver's legal name is Birgir Orn Thoroddsen; his request to change his name was denied by the Icelandic Naming Committee. Curver took out a full-page ad on his 30th birthday asking "the nation, my friends and colleagues" to use "Curver Thoroddsen" starting 1 February 2006.
