= Einar Örn Benediktsson =

Icelandic musician (born 1962)

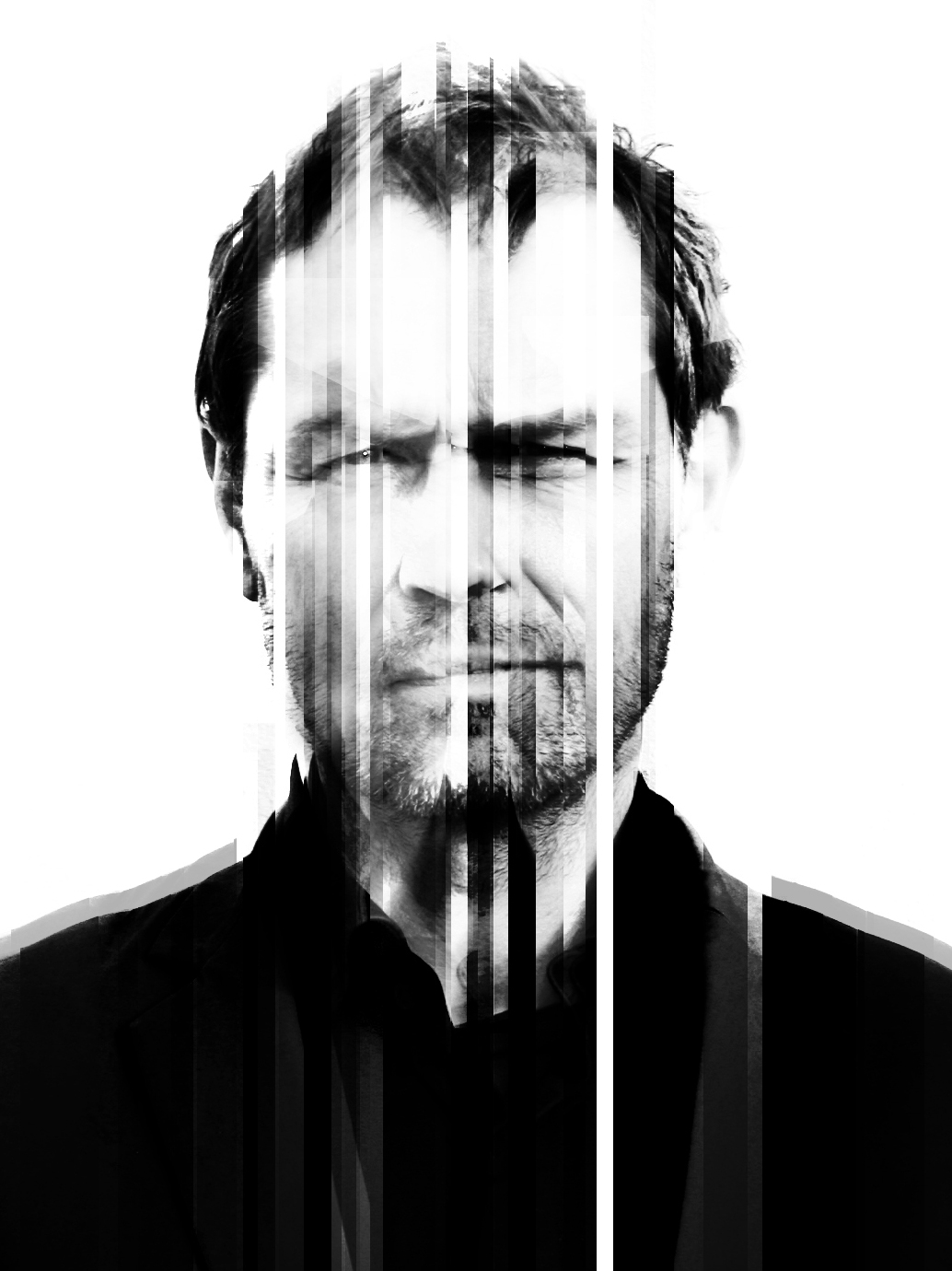
- Einar in 2012

Background information
- Also known as: Einar Örn
- Born: 29 October 1962 (age 64); Copenhagen, Denmark
- Genres: Punk rock; anarcho-punk; alternative rock; electro; electronica; experimental music
- Occupations: Musician; artist
- Instruments: Trumpet; vocals
- Years active: 1981–present
- Formerly of: Kukl; The Sugarcubes; Purrkur Pillnikk
- Website: siberia.is

Member of the Reykjavík City Council
- In office May 2010 – June 2014

Personal details
- Party: Best Party
- Education: Polytechnic of Central London (B.A., 1986)

Einar Örn Benediktsson (born 29 October 1962), often billed as Einar Örn, is an Icelandic singer and trumpet player. He was a member of the Sugarcubes. He served as a member of the Reykjavík City Council between 2010 and 2014.

== With Björk and the Sugarcubes ==
Einar has been described as the first punk in Iceland. He claims he became interested in punk rock after reading about Johnny Rotten vomiting on an aeroplane and listening to John Peel on his mother's car radio. Einar spent the summer of 1977 in London, where his father worked. Through this, he was able to make contacts enabling the Reykjavík arts festival to book The Clash in 1980.

In the early 1980s, Einar was the lead singer of the short-lived punk group Purrkur Pillnikk. Following Purrkur Pillnikk's demise in 1983, Einar became a member of the anarcho-punk Kukl along with the already notable Icelandic singer Björk Guðmundsdóttir. During this period, whilst studying media at the Polytechnic of Central London (now the University of Westminster) he got in touch with several punk groups such as Flux of Pink Indians and the anarchist band Crass. This eventually led to the release of Kukl's two studio albums, 1984's The Eye and 1986's Holidays in Europe, on Crass' in-house label Crass Records.

In June 1986, Smekkleysa SM or Bad Taste SM ltd was formed by a group of friends which included Einar, Björk, Sigtryggur, Einar Melax from Kukl, Bragi Ólafsson and Friðrik Erlingsson from Purrkur Pillnikk, Þór Eldon, Ólafur Engilberts and Sjón from the surrealist group Medúsa and lastly Ásmundur Jónsson from Gramm Records. Out of this group the Sugarcubes were formed, with Einar sharing vocal duties with Björk. While with the Sugarcubes, some critics scorned him for his bizarre spoken-word rants and discordant singing, which often overshadowed Björk's more popular vocalizations. Others, however, defended his contributions as an essential component of the group's free-spirited, chaotic ethos. Einar remained with the Sugarcubes until the band's breakup in 1992.

In 2006, Einar reunited with the Sugarcubes for a one-off performance at the Laugardalshöll arena in Reykjavík.

== Post-Sugarcubes ==
After the breakup of the Sugarcubes, Einar wrote a newspaper column "Close Encounter" ("about daily life in Reykjavík"), promoted records for the Sugarcubes' former Icelandic label, Bad Taste (Smekkleysa), which he had co-founded, and worked as a bartender. Music went on the backburner: "I was discovering other things, like family life. I wanted to make music a hobby again."

He recorded with Hilmar Örn Hilmarsson (HÖH) in 1992: "We were great friends who decided to make music for the hell of it, and it turned into a record" (Frostbite, on One Little Indian). He also worked in concert promotion (two Björk shows, The Prodigy, Fugees and Massive Attack) and co-founded Reykjavík's first cybercafe The Siberia Cafe: 'We were too early. Those who knew what it was all about preferred to do their Internet hacking at home."

Einar worked for the Reykjavík Arts Festival before moving back to London in late 1997 to set up OLI's Web sites: "I saw this gap, which I could fill. It's always good to get a new perspective."

In 1998, Einar teamed up with Hilmar Örn and former Sugarcubes drummer Sigtryggur "Siggi" Baldursson as Grindverk. "It's dance music for people who cannot dance. It'll probably be instrumental too. It's not because people have criticised me, I just don't think I've written anything I want to sing." Grindverk released a single album, Gesundheit Von K, on the British-based Fat Cat Records.

In 2000, Einar collaborated with Blur lead singer Damon Albarn on the soundtrack for the acclaimed Icelandic film 101 Reykjavík. The soundtrack was released by EMI the following year. Einar also worked with Albarn's project Gorillaz on the song "Stop The Dams." The track originally appeared as a 2006 B-side on the single "Kids With Guns" / "El Mañana." It was re-released on the 2007 compilation album D-Sides.

Einar has not ruled out future musical projects stating, "I'm waiting to see if the occasion arises. The Sugarcubes wasn't scripted, remember. Of course, I'm older but I would treat the occasion with the same passion!"

== Ghostigital ==
In December 2003 Einar embarked on his first solo project. He debuted with an album called Ghostigital, recorded with the New York City-based Icelandic producer Curver. It was released by Honest Jon's Records in December 2003. The name of this first album would later turn into the name of a band, comprising Einar and Curver and a host of collaborators. The music is described as "electronic beat music", drawing in elements of dub, hip-hop, Rock and noise, combined with Einar's idiosyncratic worldview.

In 2005 Ghostigital signed with the California-based label Ipecac Recordings co-founded by Faith No More singer Mike Patton. Their first Ipecac release, In Cod We Trust, was released in March 2006. On this record Einar's son Kaktus (currently frontman of Fufanu) plays trumpet. It also features contributions from Mark E Smith, Sensational, Ásgerður Júníusdóttir and KatieJane Garside.

Ghostigital released their third studio album called Division of Culture & Tourism on Smekkleysa SM/BadTaste Records on 12 November 2012. It features contributions from Damon Albarn, David Byrne, Nick Zinner, Dälek, and King Buzzo.

== Art practice ==
In his art practice Einar Örn has utilized a wide range of media; sound art, performance, words, music and multimedia. Örn currently focuses on works on paper, large scale murals and textile prints. Einar Örn has exhibited internationally and in Iceland.

== Politics ==
Although he had no prior political experience, Einar was elected to the Reykjavík City Council in May 2010 as a member of the satirical Best Party (Besti flokkurinn) along with Reykjavík Mayor Jón Gnarr and others. Einar was second on the party's list behind Jón. Einar and other Best Party members were part of the governing coalition in Reykjavík along with the Social Democratic Alliance (Samfylkingin). He chaired the city's committee for culture and tourism. The Best Party did not run for re-election in 2014, instead choosing to disband.
