= Cornucopia (film) =

2025 documentary concert film

- Theatrical release poster
- Directed by: Ísold Uggadóttir
- Based on: Cornucopia
- Produced by: Sara Nassim; Kat Mansoor
- Music by: Björk
- Production companies: Snowstorm Productions; S101 Films; Level Forward
- Release dates: 24 January 2025 (Apple Music Live); 1 February 2025 (Iceland); 7 May 2025 (International)
- Running time: 74 minutes (Apple TV+ version); 98 minutes (full-length)
- Countries: Iceland; Portugal

Cornucopia is a 2025 documentary concert film by Björk based on the eponymous concert tour (2019–2023), which debuted as a residency at The Shed in New York City before traveling the world and concluding four years later. Conceived around songs from her ninth studio album Utopia (2017), the setlist also includes songs from Vulnicura (2015) and Fossora (2022).

The film chronicles a performance of the show at the Altice Arena in Lisbon, Portugal, directed by Icelandic filmmaker Ísold Uggadóttir, with Björk billed as "sound and visual director". The movie overlays the performances with the visuals that were projected on the screens on the background of the live setting, which were created by German artist Tobias Gremmler and several others, including Andrew Thomas Huang, Gabríela Friðriksdóttir, Warren Du Preez and Nick Thornton Jones.

A shortened version of the movie was released on Apple Music and Apple TV+ on 24 January 2025. The full-length theatrical version of the film premiered at the Smárabíó cinema in Iceland on 1 February 2025, and it was released worldwide on 7 May 2025.

== Background ==
Following the release of Vulnicura in 2015, an album that delved into themes of heartbreak and emotional healing, written during and after the end of her relationship with American artist Matthew Barney, Björk recorded her ninth studio album Utopia, which was released in 2017. Björk likened the writing of Utopia to "paradise" as opposed to Vulnicura being like "hell". To promote Utopia, Björk embarked on a concert tour in 2018, known as the Utopia tour. The shows featured the 7-piece Icelandic flute ensemble Viibra, American harpist Katie Buckley, a percussion section played by Austrian musician Manu Delago, with electronics and musical direction by Bergur Þórisson. The tour only visited Europe.

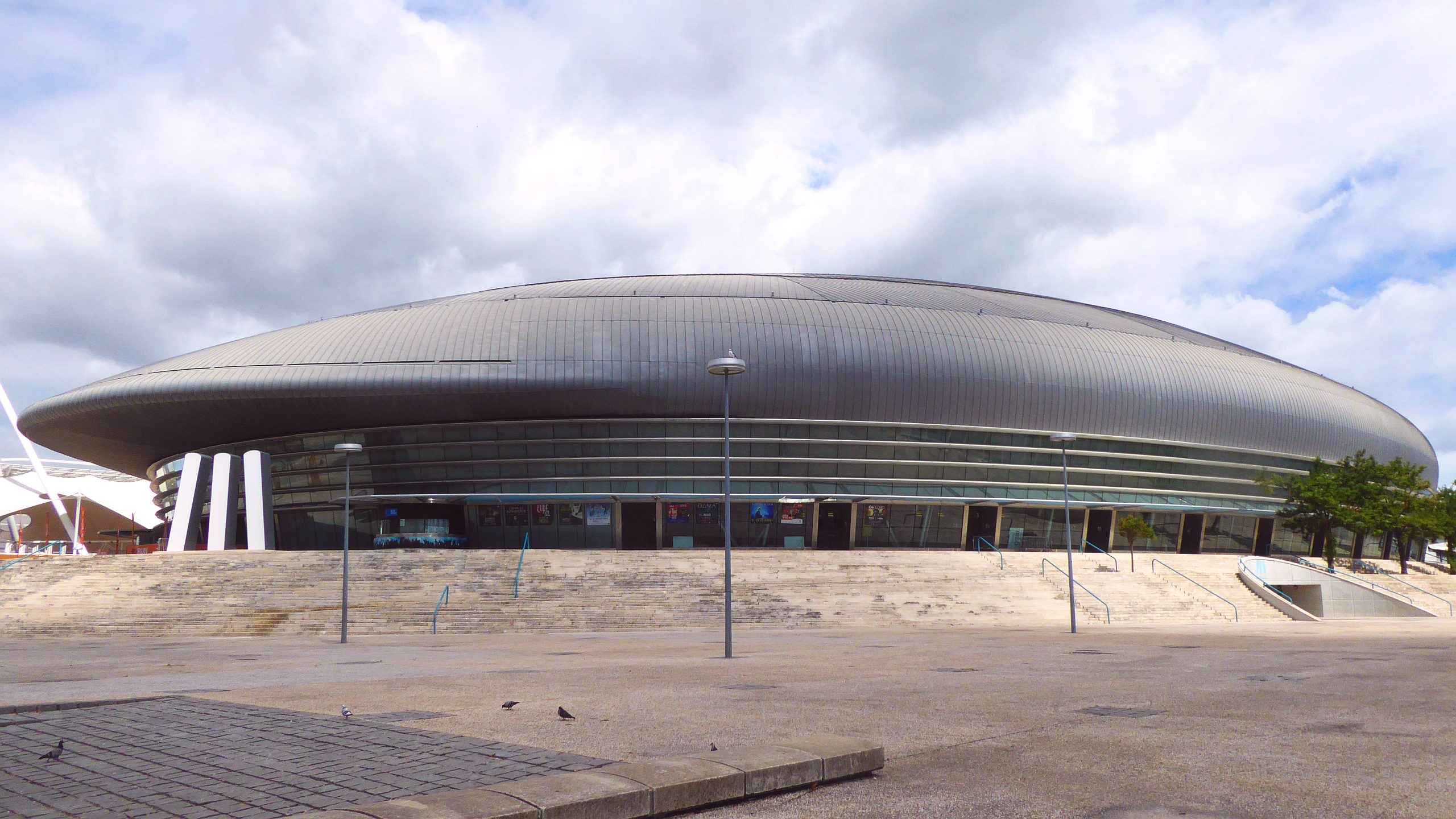
The concert film was recorded at the Altice Arena in Lisbon.

On 12 November 2018, Björk announced Cornucopia, a new theatrical production premiering at The Shed. She described it as her "most elaborate stage concert yet, where the acoustic and digital will shake hands, encouraged by a bespoke team of collaborators". The band was the same as the Utopia tour, with the inclusion of Icelandic choir The Hamrahlid Choir. The theatrical version of the show was directed by Lucrecia Martel with stage design by Chiara Stephenson and digital visual design by Tobias Gremmler. The creative team for Cornucopia also included choreography by Margrét Bjarnadóttir, lighting design by Bruno Poet, dresses and costumes by Iris Van Herpen and Olivier Rousteing, sound design by Gareth Fry, sound engineering by John Gale, with frequent collaborator and artist James Merry involved in the making of masks and in the visual co-direction of the show. The live set of Cornucopia included 27 moving curtains that captured projections on different textures and LED screens, and several bespoke instruments such as a magnetic harp, an aluphone, a circular flute, and a reverb chamber designed by Arup Group to feature a "personal chapel" on stage. After the premiere at the Shed, Cornucopia was performed as a residency in Mexico City, before adapting to an arena tour in Europe. With the COVID-19 pandemic underway, plans to continue the tour were postponed. From 2021 to 2023, Björk embarked on the Björk Orkestral tour, which featured acoustic renditions of songs from her discography. She has stated costs to tour Cornucopia were also covered by doing these performances.

In 2022, Björk released her tenth studio album, Fossora. While Utopia focused on airy, light themes, Fossora was rooted in more grounded, earthy sounds, influenced by her personal life and the pandemic's impact. In 2023, Björk resumed the Cornucopia tour in Perth, Australia, including songs from Fossora in the set list. Cornucopia is the first tour of Björk's career to not be named after a specific album, as she stated "I just knew it would be a vessel for more things".

== Release ==
In a November 2023 interview with Rolling Stone, Björk confirmed that Cornucopia would be adapted into a concert film, originally slated for release in 2024. The Cornucopia movie was officially announced during Climate Week 2024 in New York. The movie was produced by Snowstorm Productions, S101 Films and Level Forward. Talkhouse co-executive produced the concert film.

In January 2025, Björk teased the movie by giving several interviews to publications such as The Observer, GQ, Le Monde and Paper, in which she talked about the movie and the tour. On 23 January, she sat down for an interview with Zane Lowe during his show on Apple Music 1, her first on-camera interview in a decade, to talk about Cornucopia and her creative process. During the talk, Björk wore the "Soul Gown" by fashion designer Robert Wun, embroidered with 97,000 Swarovski crystals.

A shortened version of the movie, lasting 74 minutes, was released on Apple TV+ as part of the Apple Music Live series on 24 January 2025. The full-length movie was previewed exclusively for Björk and collaborators at the Smárabíó cinema in Reykjavík on 22 January, before being theatrically released in Iceland from 1 February 2025. Screenings were expected to start in March in France. It was later announced that the full movie was going to be screened internationally in 500 theaters and more than 25 countries for a limited time starting on 7 May 2025. During the theater release, after the credits roll, music videos of "Atopos", "Arisen My Senses" and "Blissing Me" were screened.

== Live album ==
Cornucopia Live

Live album / video album by Björk
- Released: 24 January 2025 (Apple Music Live); 24 October 2025 (commercial release)
- Recorded: 1 September 2023
- Venues: Altice Arena (Lisbon, Portugal)
- Length: 73:27
- Label: One Little Independent Records

Björk chronology
Fossora (2022)	Cornucopia Live (2025)	Björk Orkestral with the Hamrahlíð Choir (2026)

Björk video chronology
Vulnicura VR (2019)	Cornucopia Live (2025)

Alongside the concert film, Björk released a live album consisting of the performances from the show. A shortened version of the live recording was originally released exclusively on Apple Music and available in spatial audio under the title Apple Music Live: Björk (Cornucopia). According to a press release, the setlist was arranged "to celebrate Björk's lifetime of creative innovation". The official and complete version of the album, named Cornucopia Live (also referred to as Cornucopia: Live or Cornucopia: The Film), not attached to Apple Music, was made available on CD, Vinyl, DVD and Blu-ray on October 24, 2025.

The live recording debuted in the top 15 of the Icelandic Tónlistinn album chart. The album cover, designed by French design studio M/M Paris, was nominated in the Album Artwork of the Year category at the 2026 Icelandic Music Awards.

=== Track listing ===
All tracks written by Björk, except where noted.

Cornucopia Live – streaming edition
No.	Title	Writer(s)	Length
1.	"Family" (Intro)	Björk; Arca	3:47
2.	"The Gate"	Björk; Arca	4:50
3.	"Utopia"		3:46
4.	"Arisen My Senses"	Björk; Arca	3:56
5.	"Ovule"	Björk	4:00
6.	"Show Me Forgiveness"	Björk	1:50
7.	"Isobel"	Björk; Marius de Vries; Nellee Hooper; Sjón	5:59
8.	"Blissing Me"		3:56
9.	"Arpeggio"		1:48
10.	"Body Memory"	Björk	10:54
11.	"Hidden Place"		4:14
12.	"Mouth's Cradle"		3:27
13.	"Victimhood"		4:50
14.	"Fossora" / "Atopos"	Björk; Kasimyn	3:08
15.	"Features Creatures"	Björk; Sarah Hopkins	3:03
16.	"Courtship"		3:11
17.	"Pagan Poetry"		3:04
18.	"Losss"		5:05
19.	"Sue Me"	Björk; Arca	3:49
20.	"Tabula Rasa"		4:54
21.	"Notget"	Björk; Arca	5:55
22.	"Future Forever"	Björk; Arca	3:38
Total length:			1:33:17

Notes

- In the Apple Music audio version, "Family" (Intro), "Ovule", "Show Me Forgiveness" and "Body Memory" are omitted, "Arpeggio" is titled "Manifesto", and "The Gate" and "Utopia" make up a single track.
- In the video version, "Fungal City", a track from Fossora, plays during the end credits.

== Charts ==
Chart performance
Chart (2025)	Peak position
Icelandic Albums (Tónlistinn)	15

== See also ==
- List of Björk live performances
- Björk: Biophilia Live – 2014 concert film directed by Peter Strickland and Nick Fenton about the Biophilia tour (2011–2014)
