= Cornucopia (tour) =

Concert tour and theatrical production by Björk

- Tour by Björk
- Official poster for Cornucopia, designed by Tobias Gremmler and M/M Paris
- Associated albums: Utopia; Fossora
- Start date: 6 May 2019
- End date: 5 December 2023
- No. of shows: 18 in North America; 21 in Europe; 4 in Oceania; 2 in Asia; 45 total

Björk concert chronology
- Utopia tour (2018); Cornucopia (2019–23); Björk Orkestral (2021–23)

Cornucopia (also called Björk's Cornucopia) was the tenth concert tour and first theatrical production by Icelandic singer and songwriter Björk. Debuting as a eight-night engagements at Manhattan's The Shed culture center, it was one of the first shows being performed at the venue, which was inaugurated in April 2019. Concepted upon Björk's ninth studio album, Utopia (2017), it is directed by Argentine film director Lucrecia Martel, and was described as the singer's "most elaborate stage concert yet."

The show featured several digital visuals created by media artist Tobias Gremmler, while Chiara Stephenson provided the stage design, which was made to resemble fungi. Onstage, Björk was backed by The Hamrahlid Choir, an Icelandic 50-people choir, which would also open the show. The live band included a 7-piece flute ensemble, a harpist, a percussion section, electronics and also a number of bespoke instruments, which were implemented in the surround sound stage design. Björk requested a reverb chamber to feature onstage, in which she could sing before technical equipments, to mimic the way she usually composes her music. Björk and the band wore dresses by Balmain's Olivier Rousteing and Iris van Herpen. A speech by Swedish climate activist Greta Thunberg was projected onstage as an interlude before the encore.

The performances were praised by critics, who lauded the singer's performance and the overall production of the show. Tickets for Cornucopia sold out quickly after going on sale. In 2025, an accompanying concert film directed by Ísold Uggadóttir, documenting the Lisbon show, was premiered on Apple TV+ in a shortened version before getting released to theaters worldwide.

== Background and concept ==
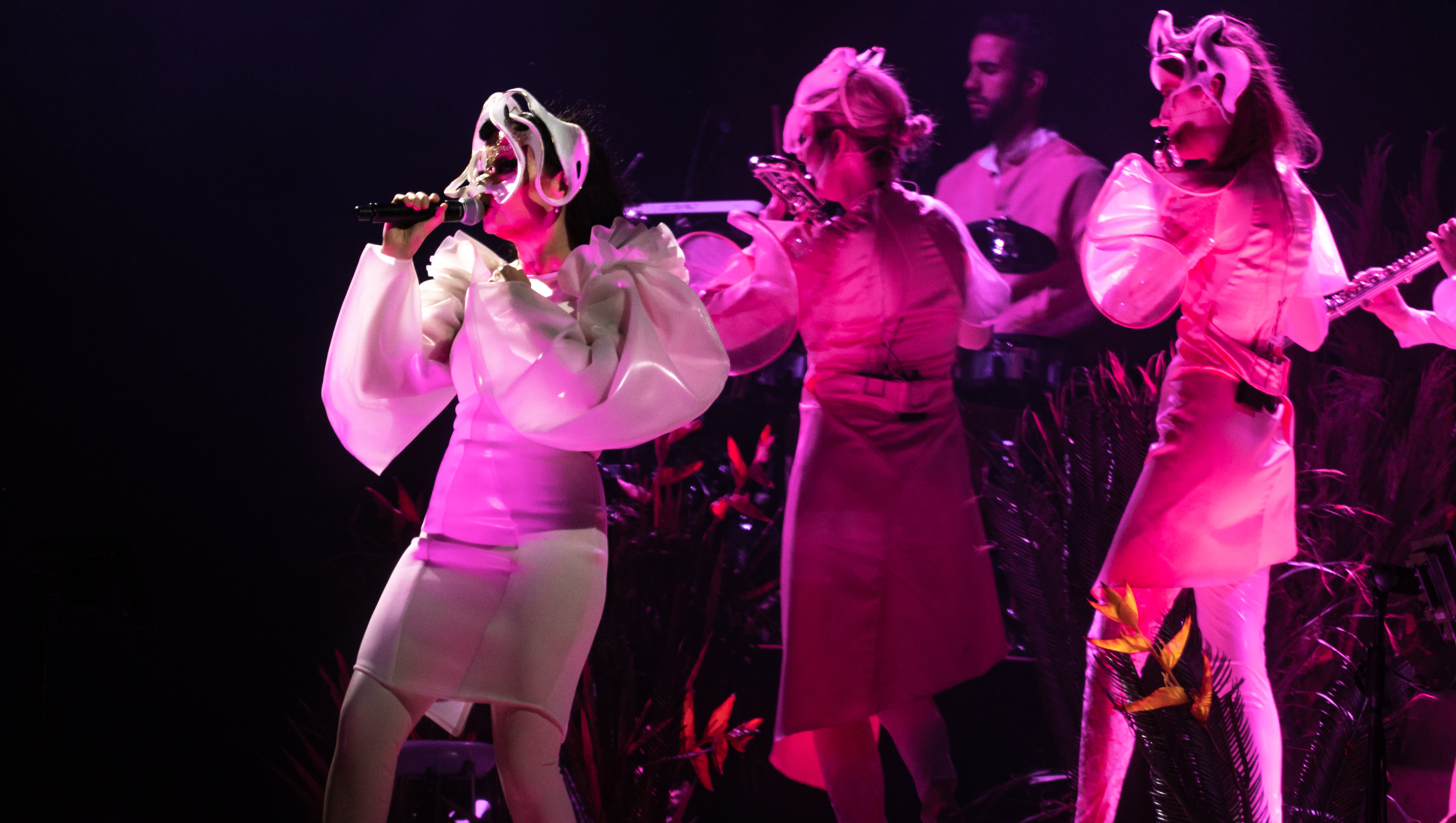
Björk performing at Victoria Park in London on 27 May 2018, during the All Points East Festival.

On 27 May 2018, Björk kicked off her Utopia tour in London after performing two dress rehearsals in her hometown of Reykjavik. The tour lasted throughout the summer and hit many European music festivals, ending in Rome on 30 July 2018.

On 12 November 2018, Björk announced her new theatrical production / concert tour Cornucopia at The Shed, a new performing arts venue opening in Manhattan's Hudson Yards neighborhood in the spring of 2019. She described it as her "most elaborate stage concert yet, where the acoustic and digital will shake hands, encouraged by a bespoke team of collaborators". On the musical side, these collaborators include the seven member female Icelandic flute ensemble Viibra, percussionist Manu Delago, harpist Katie Buckley, and Bergur Þórisson on electronics, all of whom performed on Björk's 2018 Utopia tour. The show was directed by Lucrecia Martel with stage design by Chiara Stephenson and digital visual design by Tobias Gremmler. The creative team for Cornucopia was rounded out by Margrét Bjarnadóttir (choreography), Bruno Poet (lighting design), Iris Van Herpen and Olivier Rousteing (costume design), Gareth Fry (sound design), John Gale (sound engineering), and artist James Merry, who has been a frequent collaborator and mask maker for Björk since 2011. Members of The Shed (called "Shed Movers") received early ticket access. Also unannounced was what material Björk will be playing at Cornucopia as her 2017 album, Utopia, was not referenced during the press release though the promotional art for the tour had the singer in the same outfit featured in her "Utopia" music video. On 8 January 2019, The New York Times reported the opening of The Shed as 5 April 2019, with Björk's Cornucopia opening a month later on 6 May 2019 and running for 8 performances, concluding on 1 June 2019.

On 29 April 2019, The Hamrahlid Choir was announced as part of Cornucopia's lineup, conducted by Þorgerður Ingólfsdóttir. Björk herself was once a member of the famous choir and utilized them for the Utopia track "Body Memory". Airfare for the 50-person choir was provided by the Icelandic government, with Minister of Education Lilja Alfreðsdóttir saying, "the state often strengthens cultural events" and "this will be very good for all parties". This news broke as part of an update to The Shed's digital program for Björk's Cornucopia which also announced new versions of classic Björk tracks "Isobel" and "Mouth's Cradle" prepared by Utopia's co-producer, Arca.

The day after the show opened, Björk confirmed to Dazed her plans to tour Cornucopia around the globe. On 24 May 2019, it was announced that the show would continue as a concert tour with additional shows in Mexico City. On 5 August 2019, Björk announced five additional arena shows for the tour, taking place in Belgium, Luxembourg, England, Scotland and Ireland.

== Development ==
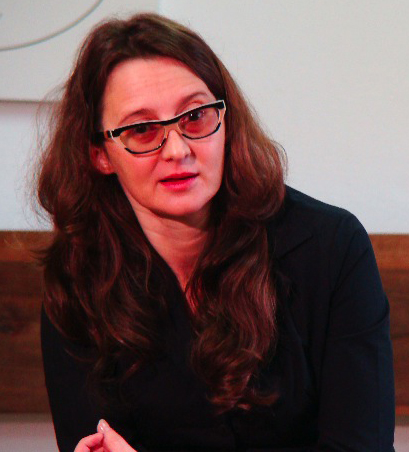
Argentine film maker Lucrecia Martel directed the show.

Björk views Cornucopia as "digital theater" and a "sci-fi pop concert." She instinctively knew the music of Utopia was best suited to "a theatrical set design and staging for the songs to be semi-believable." The Shed's artistic director, Alex Poots, commissioned the work and said he "would've been really upset if (The Shed) hadn't seemed relevant" to Björk. They first worked together at the Manchester International Festival in 2011 when Poots, working as artistic director, commissioned the first of seven Biophilia tour stops. Poots admires Björk's ability to "(keep her) eyes wide open all over," her "prodigal approach to creativity" and her "yearning to reinvent." Björk spoke equally well of Poots, complimenting his positive attitude towards "idiosyncratic ideas" and his disinterest in "differentiating between high and low arts." Björk also described her new show as "an optimistic proposal" on how the world can deal with climate change. She envisioned a possible "postapocalyptic" future where "plants, birds and humans will merge into a new mutant species," an idea she created sonically on Cornucopia's 2017 parent album, Utopia. "On the album there are birds that sound like synths, synths that sound like flutes, and flutes that sound like birds... Nature will still offer energy, optimism and life. She always finds a way."

Lucrecia Martel was brought onto the production in January 2019, replacing original director John Tiffany of Harry Potter and the Cursed Child fame. Björk described Martel as "instinctive, vibrant and fun" and Cornucopia is Martel's first theatrical production in New York after a celebrated and ongoing career as a filmmaker in Argentina. Martel admitted to finding Björk's unique working methods and turns of phrase "a little bit hard to understand" at times and often feared, "this is a disaster," but, she concluded, "when I see everything together, it is incredible." While Björk did the musical arrangements, Martel added "materiality and physicality" and devised the special projection concept which throws up digital artist Tobias Gremmler's creations against a curtain of ropes placed in front of the stage in addition to the large screen behind the performers. "The whole show," Björk said, "is a lot about females supporting each other" and she described her flute arrangements as "folk music for the future." She sees her acoustic and electronic fusions as "ways to express the spiritual in the digital... there is an enormous need to the find a place for the soul in our global landscape." Supporting this grassroots, female-led vision is a direct appeal for global climate reform by young Swedish activist Greta Thunberg whose video message appears towards the end of the show unencumbered by digital effects or music. Thunberg and Björk's daughter are roughly the same age, and Björk notes that their generation "is extremely aware of the power of activism, and I'm very proud of them." The Utopia concept is a proposal to deal with nature in "a more compassionate way... Hopefully (starting) from a female point of view will help" And, Björk concluded, after nature is brought to the brink, "we would all go to an island and become mutants between plants and birds, break off branches and make them into flutes and start playing."

== About the show ==
=== Fashion ===
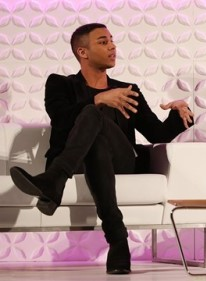
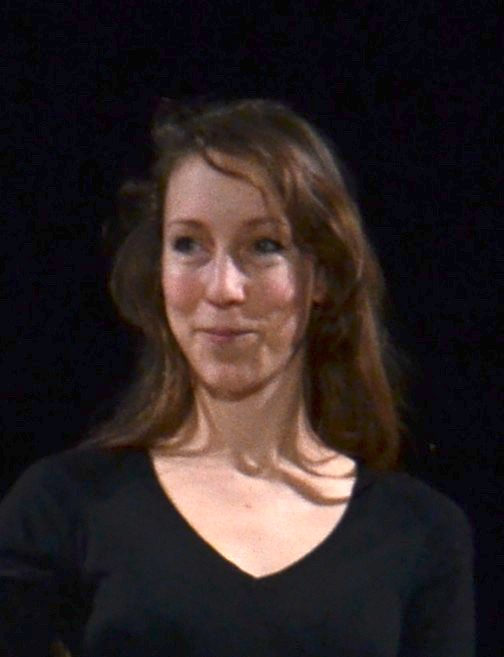
Fashion designers Olivier Rousteing (left) and Iris van Herpen (right) designed costumes for the show.

Costume designer Olivier Rousteing of Balmain revealed he's been a Björk fan since her Debut album and that Dancer in the Dark, which Björk starred in and composed the soundtrack to, is his favorite film. The Icelandic singer reached out to Rousteing after she saw Balmain's Spring 2019 couture line: "It was a curious feeling after me and (frequent collaborator) James Merry had been swirling around in our utopian hemisphere for a while to see Olivier Rousteing's Balmain collection a few months ago and witness such an obvious overlap between both of our headspaces. We had been looking for plantlike uniforms for habitants of this sci-fi concert, and we were thrilled when we found it." "It's often hard to describe music without words," Björk later said, "but Balmain really understands my esoteric descriptions." Rousteing had to alter each piece to fit the physical needs of Björk and the other musicians, of which he dressed 15 including Viibra, the flute septet and percussionist Manu Delago with particular attention paid to harpist Katie Buckly's outfit. In all, Balmain contributed 3 different outfits for Bjork herself to wear during Cornucopia's run at The Shed, including a new dress in Utopia's green/blue color scheme. "I think the fact that she has no boundaries with her music," Rousteing said, "that's where we connected, and that's what she loved about the last couture show. Is it fashion? Is it art? Is it furniture? What is that? There's no name. You can't put it in a box. You cannot label it, and I think that's what she loved."

After seeing everything come together during the opening night dress rehearsal, costume designer Rousteing was moved to "tears. It was really emotional for me and sometimes I think we forget that fashion is about emotion. This was pure, beautiful emotions."

For the shows in Dublin, Oslo, Copenhagen and Stockholm, Björk wore new costumes designed respectively by Dilara Findikoglu, Manish Arora, Yuhan Wang and Noir Kei Ninomiya.

=== Stage and instruments ===
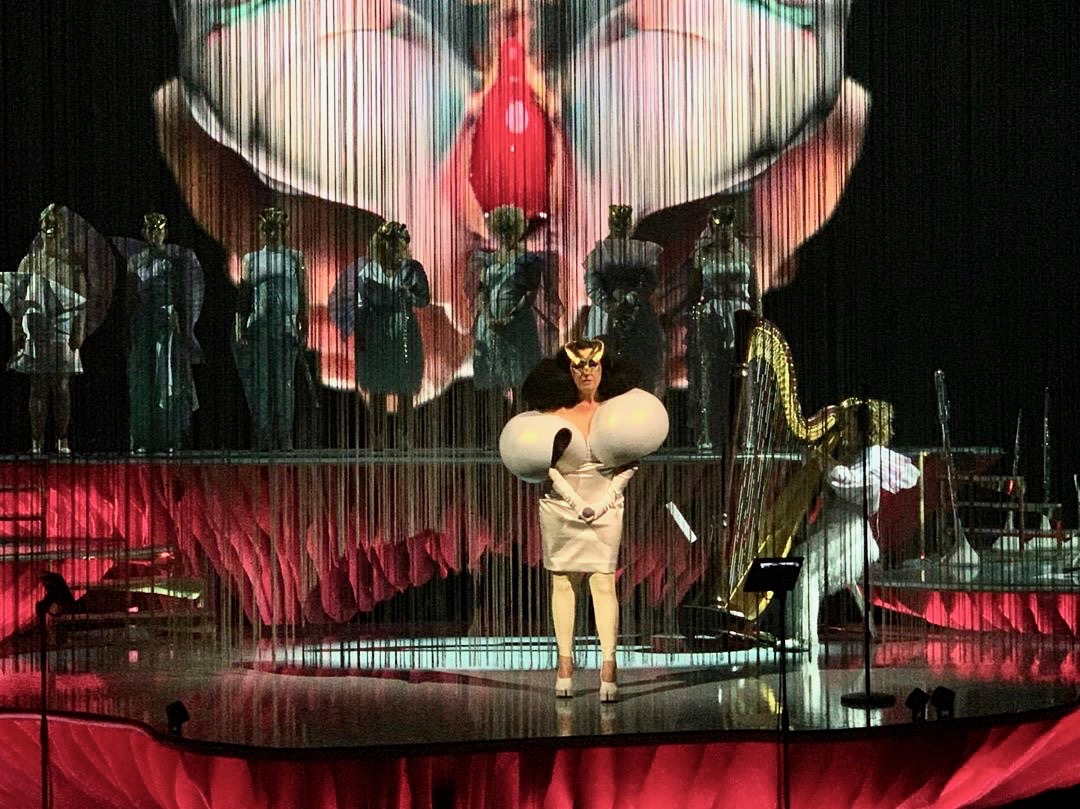
Björk performing at The Shed in New York City on 9 May 2019.

In an interview with Vogue Magazine set designer Chiara Stephenson revealed that "Björk wanted Cornucopia to be both intensely intimate, as though the audience could feel her whispering in their ear, and vast, voyeuristic and distant,". The designer was inspired by natural shapes to create the setting for the show, saying "Natural forms are at the heart... whether the intricate beauty of fungi or the grand wonder of the cosmos, there was no part of reality too big or small to consider. In the same way, Björk's music is so personally and emotionally raw, it takes you deep into your own life experience, but is also about the human condition in general." Stephenson went on to say that she sees no separation between high and low culture and sees Björk as a "brilliant example" of someone who can "confidently" move between both worlds. She also detailed how the stage would use a surround sound system that syncs with a surround lighting, to give the audience the feeling of being surrounded by the music and the stage. Steve Jones from d&b audiotechnik explained that "Björk wanted the sound for Cornucopia to create an otherworldly sensory experience that draws the visual, aural and virtual elements together and utilizing Soundscape, from the studio composition scenario all the way through to the show performance scenario has delivered of that vision". Craig Jenkins of Vulture describes the stage by saying that "[the stage] gives the appearance of an outgrowth of oyster mushrooms, one for the singer and her harp player, Katie Buckley; another for drummer and percussionist, Manu Delago; a third for the storied Icelandic producer Bergur Þórisson; and a fourth for the flute septet, Viibra. A screen behind the flutes pumps in visuals, sometimes mined from the music videos and sometimes not, while complementary videos are displayed on either side of the band and projected on a series of translucent curtains at the front of the stage".

The show was backed by several bespoke instruments, created or modified to suit the needs of the show and the singer. The performance of "Body Memory" utilizes a unique instrument consisting of four conjoined flutes that are curved to form a circle called The Circle Flute. The instrument cannot be played by a single performer and requires four players to come together into a quartet where each player's relationship to the instrument becomes inseparable from their relationship to the others. It was designed by an Icelandic /German artist duo called Studio Brynjar & Veronika and built by flute maker Jean Yves Roosen. The show features a set of two organ pipes, which make the tone of E♭ and B-flat major, a xylosynth, an aluphone, a piezoelectric violin made by MONAD Studio and the Segulharpa, a harp whose steel strings interact with the magnetic fields created by the internal analog circuitry.

In addition to this, the show also includes a cocoon-like reverb chamber, a large pod created by meant to recreate the effect of singing alone in nature and the way she often composes music. The singer first described the concept for the chamber to Arup Group's acoustic designer Shane Myrbeck via Skype call. At first, they were to have multiple rooms on stage, but at the end the team settled for only one, with an octagonal layout with a tall roof, inspired by the architecture of cathedrals. To test the design, Björk sent the group an audio of her performing a song with a reverb effect, before completing the work in London where Björk could test the reverb room before the opening of the show. Björk admitted to being "scared" to be so raw in front of an audience.

=== Concert synopsis ===
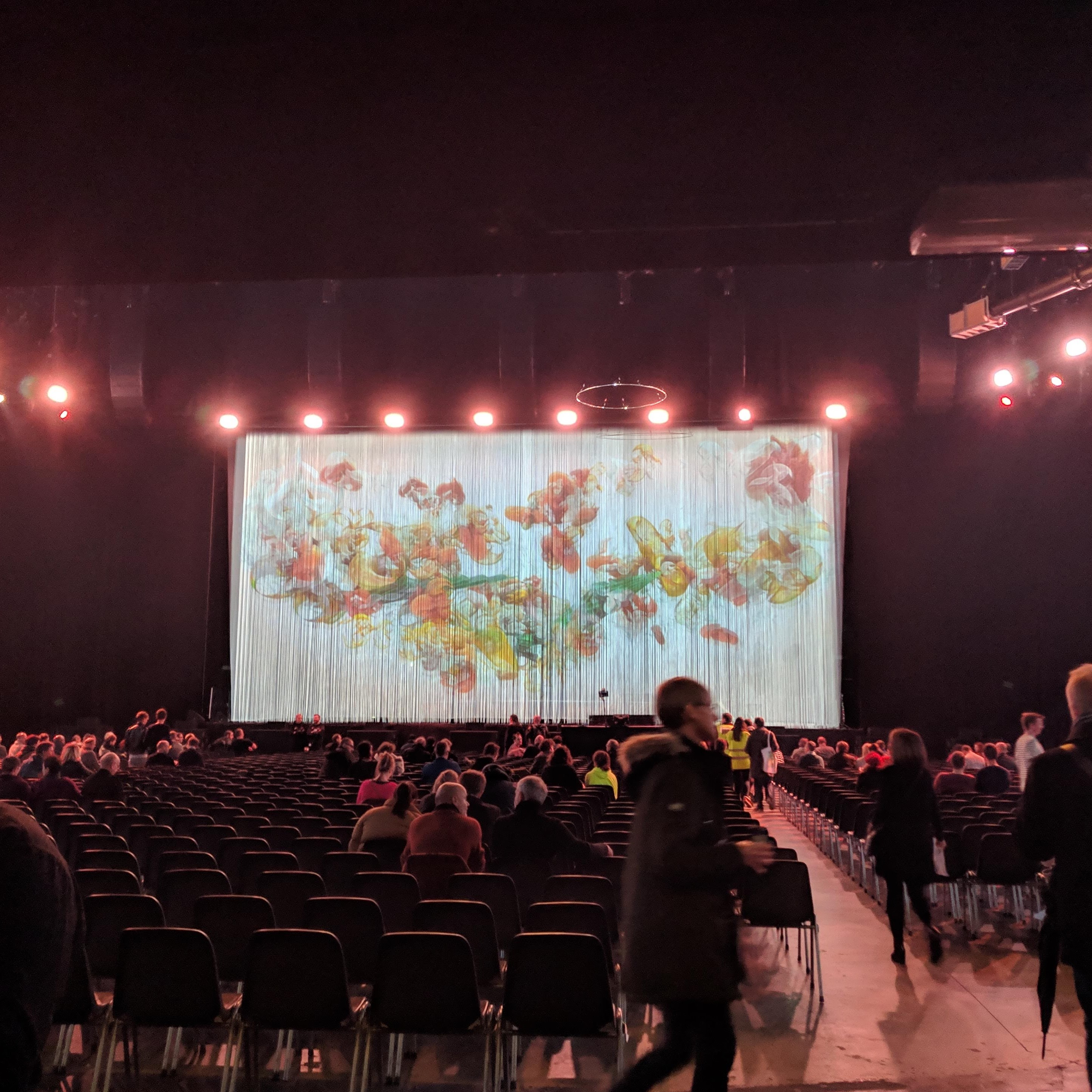
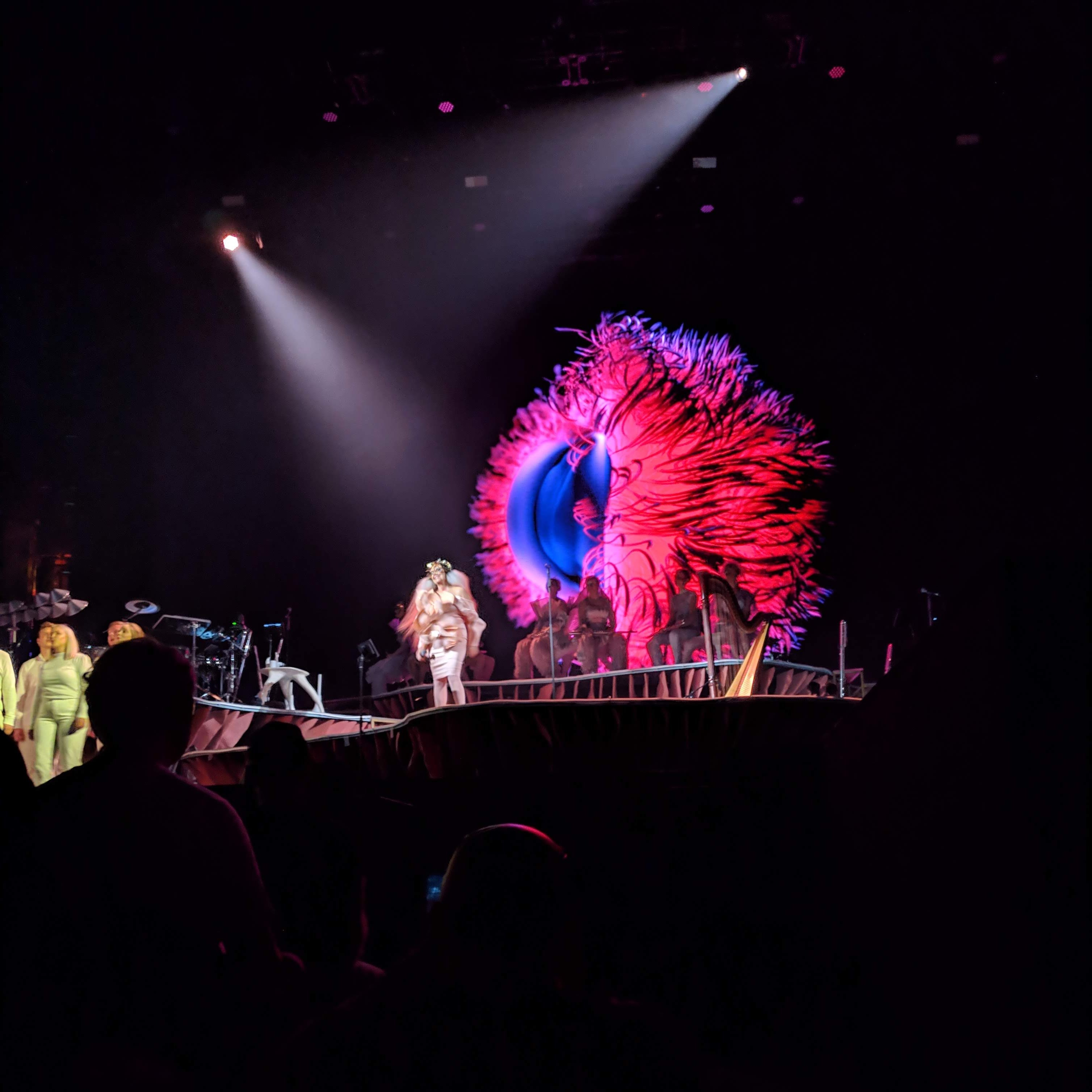
Cornucopia stage at Forest National in Brussels (left) with the singer performing (right) on 13 November 2019.

The Hamrahlid Choir opened the evening with a 20-minute set of traditional Icelandic songs and choral arrangements of Björk's "Sonnets/Unrealities XI" and "Cosmogony". Björk emerged from "swirly helixes of color" to perform "The Gate", which segues into "Utopia" and "Arisen My Senses". The singer goes inside the reverb chamber to perform the a cappella track "Show Me Forgiveness" and "Venus as a Boy", which she hadn't performed since 2006 and 2011 respectively. Afterwards, Björk sings the Utopia album track "Claimstaker" and the second single from Post, "Isobel", which was re-imagined by Arca and features "percussive intervention". Later on, Brooklyn-based artist serpentwithfeet joined Björk on stage for a live rendition of his duet remix of "Blissing Me". Following the performance, a video interlude projects a message about the risks of "pulling out of the Paris Agreement, while backed by a flute solo. Björk then sings "Body Memory", while accompanied by the Flute Circle and the choir. At one point during the performance, confetti resembling snow start falling on stage. Björk and the choir then sing a reworked version of "Hidden Place" and "Mouth's Cradle". Later on, Björk segues a shortened version of "Pagan Poetry" into "Losss", before singing other Utopia tracks, "Sue Me" and "Tabula Rasa". Before the encore, a video message by Greta Thunberg is shown, in which she addresses climate change and sustainable energy:

We are about to sacrifice our civilization for the opportunity of a very small number of people to continue making unimaginable amounts of money. The biosphere is being sacrificed so that rich people in countries like mine can live in luxury. But it's the suffering of the many which pays for the luxuries of a few. In the year 2078, I will celebrate my 75th birthday. If I have children, maybe they will spend the day with me. … Maybe they will ask why you didn't do anything while there still was time to act. You say you love your children above all else, and yet you're stealing their future in front of their very eyes. Until you start focusing on what needs to be done rather than what is politically possible, there is no hope. We cannot solve a crisis without treating it as a crisis … And if the solutions within this system are so impossible to find, then maybe we should change the system itself. They have ignored us in the past and they will ignore us again. They have run out of excuses and we are running out of time. But I'm here to tell you that change is coming, whether they like it or not. The real power belongs to the people.

Björk then returns onstage after changing into a dress by Iris van Herpen to perform "Future Forever" with the choir. She then proceeds to introduce the musicians that played with her, before closing the show with "Notget", taken from her 2015 album Vulnicura.

== Critical response ==
The future of live music is in safe hands.

— The Arts Desk about Cornucopia

Björk's Cornucopia opened to positive reviews from the music press. RockNYC gave the preview dress rehearsal an "A" grade and called it "stunning" and "the best show in town...like reality overlaid on to virtual reality" and "a world of sound like no other." Writer Imam Lababedi called serpentwithfeet's surprise duet with Björk on "Blissing Me" and new renditions of "Isobel" and "Venus as a Boy" evening highlights and described Björk's voice as "warm and clear and confident." The Guardian labeled it "a masterclass in exploration" and Rolling Stone said the show's billing as Björk's most elaborate staged concert to date "would be a tough claim to refute". They described the digital projections against the stage's forefront curtain of threads as "jaw-dropping" and "lushly layered" and heralded the environmental message behind the show as "gloriously angry in the way Björk can be at her best" and "punk-rock Valkyrian fury." Both publications praised the musicians that joined Björk on stage, with The Guardian signaling out The Hamrahlid Choir as opening act and support during the main show, as well as the stark, unprocessed video projection at the end of the concert by 16 year old Swedish climate activist Greta Thunberg. Rolling Stone called it "a poignant passing of the torch from artist to activist" and said "it put the datastorm complexity of what came earlier into stark, simple, fittingly scary perspective."

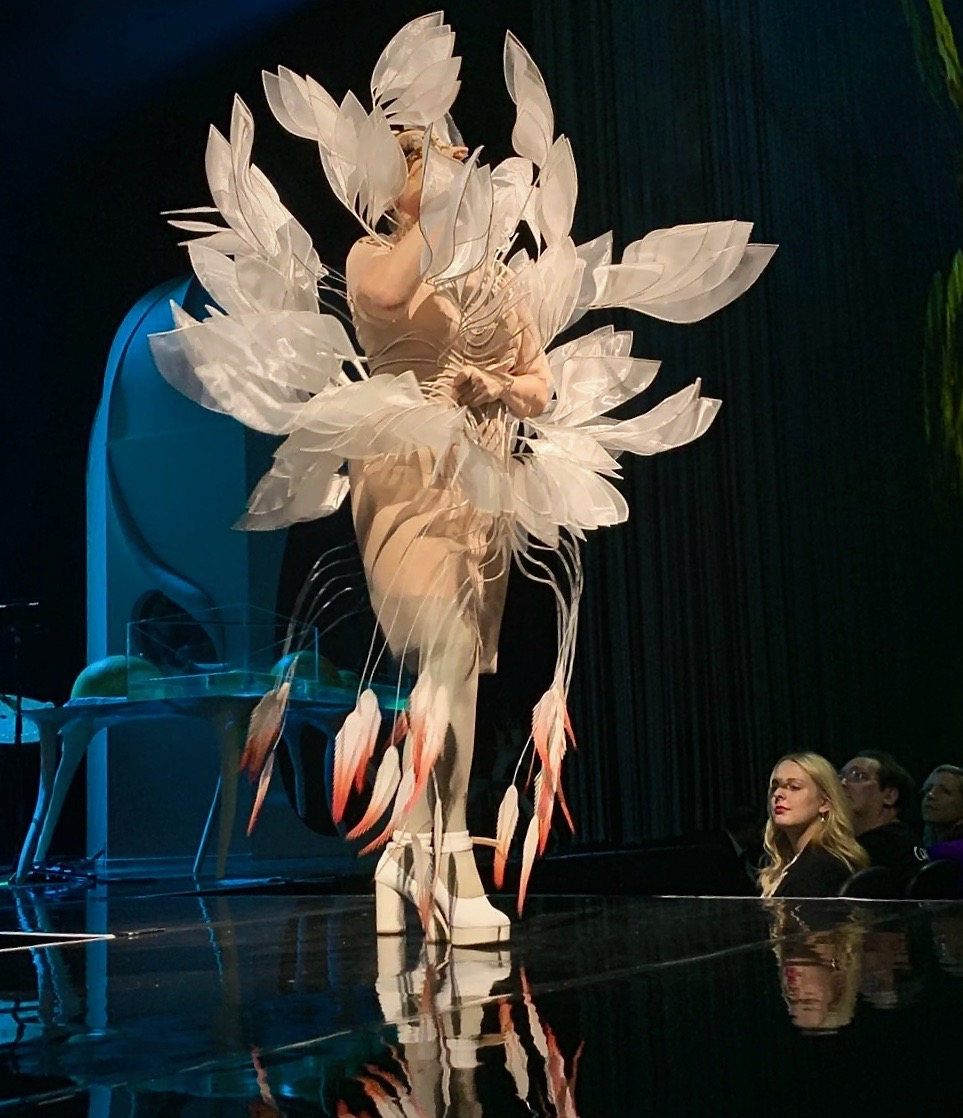
Björk performing at The Shed in New York City on 6 May 2019.

Entertainment Weekly praised the show and its visual presentation, with journalist Leah Greenblatt describing it as "the meticulous product of her own supremely Björkian making, from the heralding trumpets and imported Icelandic choir that open the evening to the gleaming Barbarella tea-cup platforms and the mind-bending visuals, projected throughout like screensavers from a civilization much more advanced than ours". Vulture journalist Craig Jenkins billed the show as "the Wildest Visual Display in a Concert That I've Ever Seen". He went on to commend the show as "a dream of a future where technology and nature can commune as one. For 100 minutes, Cornucopia helps the audience to imagine that world. It is one of the most incredible displays of lights and sounds ever to grace a stage in the city". Eli Petzold from The Reykjavík Grapevine analysed the theme of the show, noting that "In Cornucopia, coherence, linearity, and familiarity are indulgences rather than givens, underscoring the overarching imperative to reject comfort and precedent in search of a better future". In a mixed review for the show, Financial Times journalist John Rockwell observed how "Björk's remarkable ear for musical timbres can get lost in a bass-heavy sonic sludge. Her fascinating lyrics are pretty much impossible to discern, and the costumes often verge on the downright weird. The whole affair verges on emotion overcome by pretension", but concluded by writing that "there is nothing out there like Björk, in Iceland or Brooklyn or the world. She epitomises Icelandic art while transcending it". NJ.com commended the show for its promotion of climate change awareness, noting that "that's not to suggest this performance was simply a vehicle for Björk's political views, or to say the musicians relied on the room's exceedingly advanced tech as some sort of crutch. No, the most dazzling moments came from the humans involved in this mesmerizing production, which was at once bafflingly esoteric and immediately unforgettable". Gabriela Tully Claymore of Stereogum described the show as "a sensory feast".

== Spin-off media ==
=== Book ===
Cornucopia: The Book
- Author: Björk; Santiago Felipe
- Genre: Photography
- Publisher: One Little Independent
- Publication date: 15 November 2024
- Publication place: United Kingdom
- Media type: Print (softcover)
- Pages: 480
- ISBN: 978-1-7396-0567-4

On 8 October 2024, Björk announced the release of a photo-book documenting the tour. The book, titled Cornucopia: The Book, chronicles the performances with images shot by photographer Santiago Felipe and designed by M/M Paris. The book features 313 color images, a combination of photographs by Felipe and imagery designed for the concerts by directors Tobias Gremmler, Andrew Thomas Huang, Gabríela Friðriksdóttir and Pierre-Alain Giraud, Nick Knight, Warren Du Preez and Nick Thornton Jones.

Björk observed that the presence of digital art taken from the visuals accompanying the tour as a "subplot woven in: a second story of an avatar—a modern marionette who alchemically mutates, from puppet to puppet, from the injury of a heart wound to a fully healed state".

The book was released on 15 November 2024, and additionally featured a 16 pages staple-bound booklet printed in fluorescent colours, attached to the main book with bookmark ribbon. To promote the release of the book, Björk performed two DJ sets. On 8 December 2024, she performed at the Rough Trade shop in London, while on 13 December 2024 she was featured during the Mánakvöld – Cold Moon event at the Smekkleysa record store in Reykjavík, Iceland.

=== Film ===
In a November 2023 interview with Rolling Stone, Björk confirmed that Cornucopia would be adapted into a concert film, slated for release in 2024. The Cornucopia movie was officially announced during Climate Week 2024 in New York. The movie, filmed in Lisbon, Portugal, was produced by Snowstorm Productions, S101 Films and Level Forward. A shortened version of the movie was premiered on Apple TV+ as part of the Apple Music Live series on 24 January 2025, with a full length version receiving a theatrical release.

== Set list ==
6 May 2019 – 31 March 2023

This set list is from the 6 May 2019 concert in New York. It is not intended to represent all concerts for the tour.

Choir opening performance
"Family" video intro

1. "The Gate"
2. "Utopia"
3. "Arisen My Senses"
4. "Show Me Forgiveness"
5. "Venus as a Boy"
6. "Claimstaker"
7. "Isobel"
8. "Blissing Me"

"Arpeggio" flute interlude

9. "Body Memory"
10. "Hidden Place"
11. "Mouth's Cradle"
12. "Features Creatures"
13. "Courtship"
14. "Pagan Poetry"
15. "Losss"
16. "Sue Me"
17. "Tabula Rasa"

Encore

Video message from Greta Thunberg

18. "Future Forever"
19. "Notget"

Notes

- Björk performed "Blissing Me" with serpentwithfeet during the shows in New York, Los Angeles and San Francisco.
- Starting from the 3 March 2023 show in Perth, Björk performed "Atopos" and "Ovule" instead of "Venus as a Boy" and "Claimstaker".
- During the last three shows in Perth, the encore performance was omitted, with "Future Forever" being performed only by the choir.
- During the shows in Tokyo, Kasimyn made a guest appearance during the performance of "Atopos".
1 September 2023 – 5 December 2023

This set list is from the 23 September 2023 concert in Bologna. It is not intended to represent all concerts for the tour.

"Family" video intro

1. "The Gate"
2. "Utopia"
3. "Arisen My Senses"
4. "Ovule"
5. "Show Me Forgiveness"
6. "Venus as a Boy"
7. "Claimstaker"
8. "Isobel"
9. "Blissing Me"

"Arpeggio" flute interlude

10. "Victimhood"
11. "Fossora" / "Atopos"
12. "Features Creatures"
13. "Courtship"
14. "Pagan Poetry"
15. "Losss"
16. "Sue Me"
17. "Tabula Rasa"

Encore

Video message from Greta Thunberg
"Mycelia" video interlude

18. "Future Forever"
19. "Notget"

Notes

- During the 1 September 2023 show in Lisbon, "Body Memory", "Hidden Place" and "Mouth's Cradle" were performed with the choir instead of "Venus as a Boy", "Claimstaker" and "Mycelia".

== Tour dates ==
List of 2019 concerts
Date (2019)	City	Country	Venue	Opening act	Attendance	Revenue
6 May	New York City	United States	The McCourt at The Shed	The Hamrahlid Choir	10,000 / 10,000	$1,151,693
9 May	New York City	United States	The McCourt at The Shed	The Hamrahlid Choir	10,000 / 10,000	$1,151,693
12 May	New York City	United States	The McCourt at The Shed	The Hamrahlid Choir	10,000 / 10,000	$1,151,693
16 May	New York City	United States	The McCourt at The Shed	The Hamrahlid Choir	10,000 / 10,000	$1,151,693
22 May	New York City	United States	The McCourt at The Shed	The Hamrahlid Choir	10,000 / 10,000	$1,151,693
25 May	New York City	United States	The McCourt at The Shed	The Hamrahlid Choir	10,000 / 10,000	$1,151,693
28 May	New York City	United States	The McCourt at The Shed	The Hamrahlid Choir	10,000 / 10,000	$1,151,693
1 June	New York City	United States	The McCourt at The Shed	The Hamrahlid Choir	10,000 / 10,000	$1,151,693
17 August	Mexico City	Mexico	Parque Bicentenario	UNAM Staccato Choir	18,930 / 18,930	$1,519,170
20 August	Mexico City	Mexico	Parque Bicentenario	UNAM Staccato Choir	18,930 / 18,930	$1,519,170
23 August	Mexico City	Mexico	Parque Bicentenario	UNAM Staccato Choir	18,930 / 18,930	$1,519,170
27 August	Mexico City	Mexico	Parque Bicentenario	UNAM Staccato Choir	18,930 / 18,930	$1,519,170
30 August	Mexico City	Mexico	Parque Bicentenario	UNAM Staccato Choir	18,930 / 18,930	$1,519,170
13 November	Brussels	Belgium	Forest National	The Hamrahlid Choir	4,336 / 5,073	$434,696
16 November	Esch-sur-Alzette	Luxembourg	Rockhal	The Hamrahlid Choir	5,512 / 5,512	$461,189
19 November	London	United Kingdom	The O_{2} Arena	The Hamrahlid Choir	12,655 / 12,655	$1,328,590
25 November	Glasgow	United Kingdom	The SSE Hydro	The Hamrahlid Choir	5,797 / 7,111	$480,487
28 November	Dublin	Ireland	3Arena	The Hamrahlid Choir	8,018 / 8,018	$686,507
2 December	Oslo	Norway	Oslo Spektrum	The Hamrahlid Choir	6,321 / 6,890	$682,501
5 December	Copenhagen	Denmark	Royal Arena	The Hamrahlid Choir	6,376 / 7,031	$565,432
8 December	Stockholm	Sweden	Ericsson Globe	The Hamrahlid Choir	7,879 / 8,345	$649,756

List of 2022 concerts
Date (2022)	City	Country	Venue	Opening act	Attendance	Revenue
26 January	Los Angeles	United States	Shrine Auditorium	Tonality	—	—
29 January	Los Angeles	United States	Shrine Auditorium	Tonality	—	—
1 February	Los Angeles	United States	Shrine Auditorium	Tonality	—	—
5 February	San Francisco	United States	Chase Center	Tonality	16,203 / 18,514	$2,066,217
8 February	San Francisco	United States	Chase Center	Tonality	16,203 / 18,514	$2,066,217

List of 2023 concerts
Date (2023)	City	Country	Venue	Opening act	Attendance	Revenue
3 March	Perth	Australia	Langley Park	Voyces	18,661 / 18,661	$2,000,000
6 March	Perth	Australia	Langley Park	Voyces	18,661 / 18,661	$2,000,000
9 March	Perth	Australia	Langley Park	Voyces	18,661 / 18,661	$2,000,000
12 March	Perth	Australia	Langley Park	Voyces	18,661 / 18,661	$2,000,000
28 March	Tokyo	Japan	Tokyo Garden Theatre	Samadhi Choir	—	—
31 March	Tokyo	Japan	Tokyo Garden Theatre	Samadhi Choir	—	—
1 September	Lisbon	Portugal	Altice Arena	The Hamrahlid Choir	12,110 / 12,375	$1,014,136
4 September	Madrid	Spain	WiZink Center	—N/a	8,855 / 12,589	$757,586
8 September	Paris	France	Accor Arena	—N/a	10,627 / 11,630	$1,034,638
12 September	Milan	Italy	Mediolanum Forum	—N/a	–	–
16 September	Prague	Czech Republic	O2 Arena	—N/a	–	–
19 September	Vienna	Austria	Wiener Stadthalle	—N/a	8,814 / 8,949	$663,830
23 September	Bologna	Italy	Unipol Arena	—N/a	–	–
18 November	Kraków	Poland	Tauron Arena	—N/a	–	–
21 November	Hamburg	Germany	Barclays Arena	—N/a	–	–
24 November	Leipzig	Germany	Quarterback Immobilien Arena	—N/a	–	–
28 November	Zurich	Switzerland	Hallenstadion	—N/a	6,817 / 8,000	$875,409
2 December	Nantes	France	Le Zénith	—N/a	–	–
5 December	Bordeaux	France	Arkéa Arena	—N/a	–	–
Total					167,911 / 180,283 (93%)	$16,371,837

=== Cancelled dates ===
Date	City	Country	Venue	Reason
7 June 2023	Reykjavík	Iceland	Laugardalshöll	Production issues
10 June 2023	Reykjavík	Iceland	Laugardalshöll	Production issues
13 June 2023	Reykjavík	Iceland	Laugardalshöll	Production issues

== Personnel ==
All credits adapted from The Shed official website and Cornucopia: The Book.

- Björk – creative sound, visual director, choir, flute, clarinet and strings arrangements, production, musical direction and 360 sound mixing
- James Merry – co-creative visual director, masks
- Lucrecia Martel – original theatre director

=== Music and visuals ===
- Bergur Þórisson – musical director, electronics, keyboards, trombone, magnetic harp, EWI, 3d printed violin
- Matt Robertson – musical director for rehearsals, score preparation
- Manu Delago – percussion, aluphone, waterdrums, xylosynth, dhol
- Katie Buckley – harp
- Ruth Ellen Benneth – harp (only during Mexico, Belgium, Luxembourg and London shows)
- Arca – original music co-production, new versions of "Isobel" and "Mouth's Cradle"
- serpentwithfeet – vocals on "Blissing Me" (only during New York, San Francisco and Los Angeles shows)
- Kasimyn – electronics on "Atopos" (only during Tokyo shows)

Flutes and clarinets

- Viibra – flute septet
  - Áshildur Haraldsdóttir
  - Berglind Maria Tómasdóttir
  - Björg Brjánsdóttir
  - Dagný Marinósdóttir
  - Melkorka Ólafsdóttir
  - Steinunn Vala Pálsdóttir
  - Þuríður Jónsdóttir
  - Sólveig Magnúsdóttir (only during Mexico shows)

Choirs

- The Hamrahlid Choir
  - Þorgerður Ingólfsdóttir – choir conductor
- Staccato Choir
  - Odilón Chávez – choir conductor
- Tonality
  - Alexander Lloyd Blake – choir conductor
- Voyces
- Samadhi Choir

Original visuals and animations

- Tobias Gremmler
- Andrew Thomas Huang
- Gabríela Friðriksdóttir and Pierre-Alain Giraud
- Nick Knight
- Warren Du Preez and Nick Thornton Jones
- M/M Paris and Andrea Philippon

=== Fashion ===
- Hungry – make up
- Edda Guðmundsdóttir – styling

Hair

- John Vial
- Hiro Furukawa
- Shoplifter
- Tomihiro Kono
- Eugene Souleiman
- Vasco Freitas
- Olivier Schawalder

Costumes

- Olivier Rousteing of Balmain
- Iris van Herpen
- Atsuko Kudo
- Maison Margiela
- Gucci
- Jeremy Scott
- Dilara Fındıkoğlu
- Manish Arora
- Yuhan Wang
- Noir Kei Ninomiya of Comme des Garçons
- Vanebon
- Mugler
- Dries van Noten
- threeasfour
- Rabih Kayrouz
- Rahul Mishra
- Romance Was Born
- Julia Heuer
- Undercover
- Alexander McQueen
- Acne Studios
- Thora Stefansdottir
- Repetto
- Sarah Regensburger
- Stina Randestad
- Jisoo Baik
- Jonathan Anderson for Loewe
- Bennett Clay Moses
- Sánchez-Kane
- Matty Bovan
- Andreas Kronthaler for Vivienne Westwood
- Jan Eneskey and Daniltop
- Melissa x Viktor & Rolf
- Robert Wun
- Maison KIMHĒKIM
- Vaquera
- Zomer and Amaury Darras
- KWK by Kay Kwok
- Jeffrey Campbell
- Kevin Germanier
- Coperni
- Daniel Del Core
- Venus Prototype
- Francesco Risso for Marni

=== Stage, audio and technical ===
- Peter van der Velde – production director
- Bruno Poet – lighting designer
- Richard White – lighting designer, lighting operator
- Chiara Stephenson – set designer
- Margrét Bjarnadóttir – choreography for flutes
- Chris Taplin – production manager
- Mark Cameron – stage manager
- Nunu Cruz – stage manager
- John Gale – front of house engineer
- Jack Blenkinsopp – foh system tech, 360 immersive sound tech
- Finnur Ragnarson – monitor engineer
- Manu Goodwin – monitor engineer
- Dominic Gallagher – audio & rf tech
- Paul Holleman – laser software development
- NAP Framework – laser software platform
- Daniel Bond – video operator
- Chema Menendez Herrera – video operator
- Iain Harvey – video operator, teleprompting
- Jake Stebbings – video operator, teleprompting
- Peque Varela – video editor
- Brooks Wenzel – stage, curtain and set rigger
- Lydia McDonald – stage, curtain and set rigger
- Will Dameron – stage, curtain and set rigger
- Scott Turnbull – set builder
- Ian Bell – set builder
- Simon Rackham – set builder
- Reuben Warnes – set builder
- Jake Miller – playback engineer
- Anton Wernberg – playback engineer
- Simon Schindler – percussion technician
- Catherine Verna Bentley – tour manager
- Melanie Susan Knott – tour manager
- Meg Hood – production coordinator
- Irma Studio – production design
- Rosemary Llagostera – Björk assistant day to day
- Vigdís Sigurðardóttir – choir liaison
- Chris Elms – playback midi programmer
- Raj Patel – reverb chamber designer
- Shane Myrbeck – reverb chamber designer
- Arup Group – reverb chamber designer
- Heimir Sverrison – reverb chamber fabricator
- David Schletchtstriemen – reverb chamber technician
- Richard Nutbourne – set maker
- Ken Fleary – set maker
- d&b Audiotechnik – audio provider
- Sound Expert – d&b immersive
- Steve Jones – d&b immersive
- Sam Kirby – tour agent
- David Levy – tour agent
- Derek Birkett – Björk management
- Emma Birkett – Björk management
- Chiara Michieletto – Björk management
- Santiago Felipe – photographer
