= Utopia tour (Björk) =

2018 concert tour by Björk

- Tour by Björk
- Promotional poster for the Just Music Festival in Rome
- Associated album: Utopia
- Start date: 9 April 2018
- End date: 30 July 2018
- No. of shows: 11 in Europe

Björk concert chronology
- Vulnicura tour (2015–17); Utopia tour (2018); Cornucopia (2019–23)

The Utopia tour was the ninth concert tour by Icelandic musician Björk, centering on her 2017 studio album, Utopia. The tour kicked off with 2 special stage rehearsals on 9 and 12 April 2018 at the Háskólabío Theater in Iceland before touring Europe. Utopia's live presentation later evolved into Cornucopia, a theatrical stage concert with enhanced visual and sound presentations which opened at The Shed in New York City on 6 May 2019.

== Background and concept ==
Björk announced her ninth studio album, Utopia, on 2 August 2017 to coincide with a Dazed magazine cover story which detailed the soundscape of the album as featuring flutes and birdsong. A release date was not initially revealed, but was later announced as 24 November 2017.

On 30 October 2017, Björk was announced as one of the headliners for the All Points East music festival in London on 27 May 2018. It was her first confirmed live gig during the Utopia era. On 2 November 2017, another live date was announced, this time in Aarhus, Denmark as part of the Northside Festival, to be held on 7 June 2018. Björk first performed in Aarhus on 9 September 1993, the third night of her first concert tour as a solo artist. Other tour dates, most at major European festivals, were announced after Utopia's release, including stops in Paris, Rome, Sweden, Portugal and an additional stop in the United Kingdom.

On 27 November 2017, three days after the studio album's release, Björk revealed that a live version of Utopia was in the works, saying, "I want to take a little break and then maybe in spring (of 2018) arrive with an angle of the live album. I think there were a few things I didn’t completely explore, like more with soloists and virtuoso kind of flute playing. And I’m gonna be rehearsing with the flute players here in Iceland... I just want it to happen organically in early spring. We have some additional flute songs and some different kind of angles." In an interview published on The Creative Independent from 14 December 2017, she elaborated further on the evolution the Utopia tour will take, revealing that there were two different versions of the studio album, one without birdsong and with each song separated by silence as in a traditional studio album and the final version as released with birdsong and many of the tracks cross-fading into each other. She said that the live version will "take the flutes further, into more sort of a virtuoso acoustic realm, and maybe then I will skip the birds." She also noted that throughout her career as a live performer, her fans have enjoyed the various reworkings of her back catalog, indicating that the same will happen on the Utopia tour: "There isn’t necessarily a one correct version of each song. It’s an experiment that keeps going."

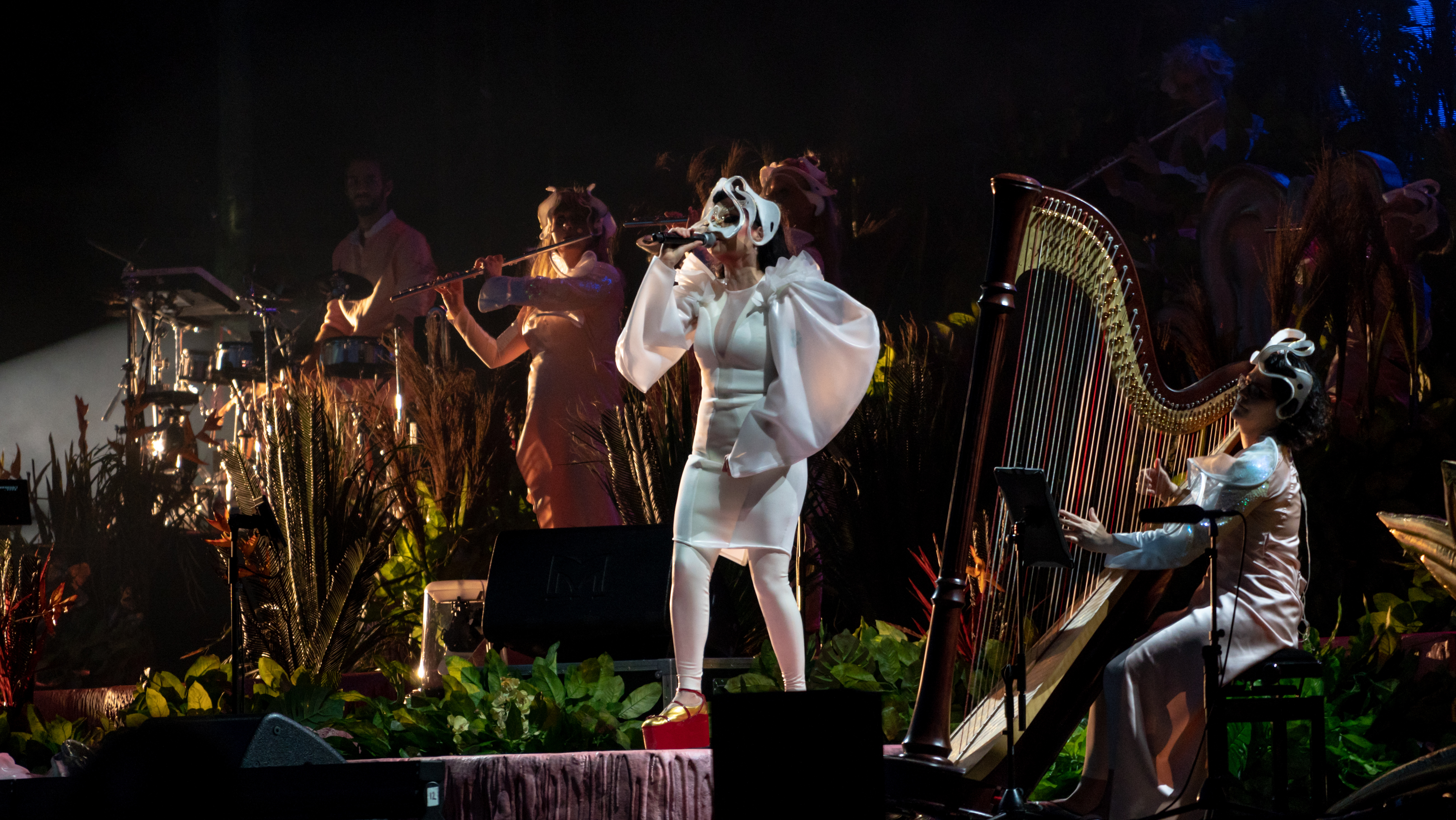
Björk performing at Victoria Park in London on May 27, 2018.

On 15 March 2018, Björk announced a special dress/stage rehearsal of the Utopia tour at the Háskólabío Theater in her hometown of Reykjavik as well as the touring members of her band. Percussionist and Hang player Manu Delago once again traveled with the Icelandic singer, a tradition that began with the 2011 Biophilia tour. He was replaced by Samuli Kosminen in Sweden and Finland. Bergur Þórisson performed on electronics. Katie Buckley played harp in all locations except Barcelona. Tara Lee Minton played harp in Barcelona. A seven-woman flute ensemble, composed of members Melkorka Ólafsdóttir, Áshildur Haraldsdóttir, Berglind María Tómasdóttir, Steinunn Vala Pálsdóttir, Björg Brjánsdóttir, Þuríður Jónsdóttir and Emilía Rós Sigfúsdóttir, rounded out the touring band; this is five fewer flutists than what appeared on the studio album, a decision Björk said would allow the listener to focus on the individual sounds each flutist is playing. "These girls are all very different,” she told The Reykjavik Grapevine. “Some of them are into modern music, some are more into French romanticism, others are doing more improv and experimental music, and they’re the best flautists in Iceland!" Arca, who co-produced the studio album and created the beats, electronics and synths, did not tour with her. The dress rehearsal was set for 12 April 2018, over a month ahead of the previously announced first date at All Points East in London. The tour was designed by Heimi Sverrisson and choreographed by Margrét Bjarnadóttir. A second rehearsal date was later added at the same Icelandic venue on 9 April 2018 due to the original date selling out, which moved up the premiere of the Utopia tour by three days. While doing press for the opening night of the tour, the flute band's name was revealed: Viibra.

== Reception ==
The Utopia tour debuted to very favorable reviews in Iceland. The Reykjavik Grapevine said that though the concert was billed as a 'dress rehearsal', "No such qualification was needed: it was a slick, arena-ready live presentation, with lavish sound, staging, choreography and visuals." They went on to describe it as "lush" and "organic" and a "rich sonic and visual world" perfectly representing its parent album. Writing about the choreography of the 7 female flutists, Icelandic website Visir noted that "it was simply amazing to watch the flutes play and dance at the same time" and praised the work of previously unannounced touring band member and harpist Katie Buckley, who also played the harp on the studio album, and summed up the entire evening as a "dazzling good concert with this magnificent artist."

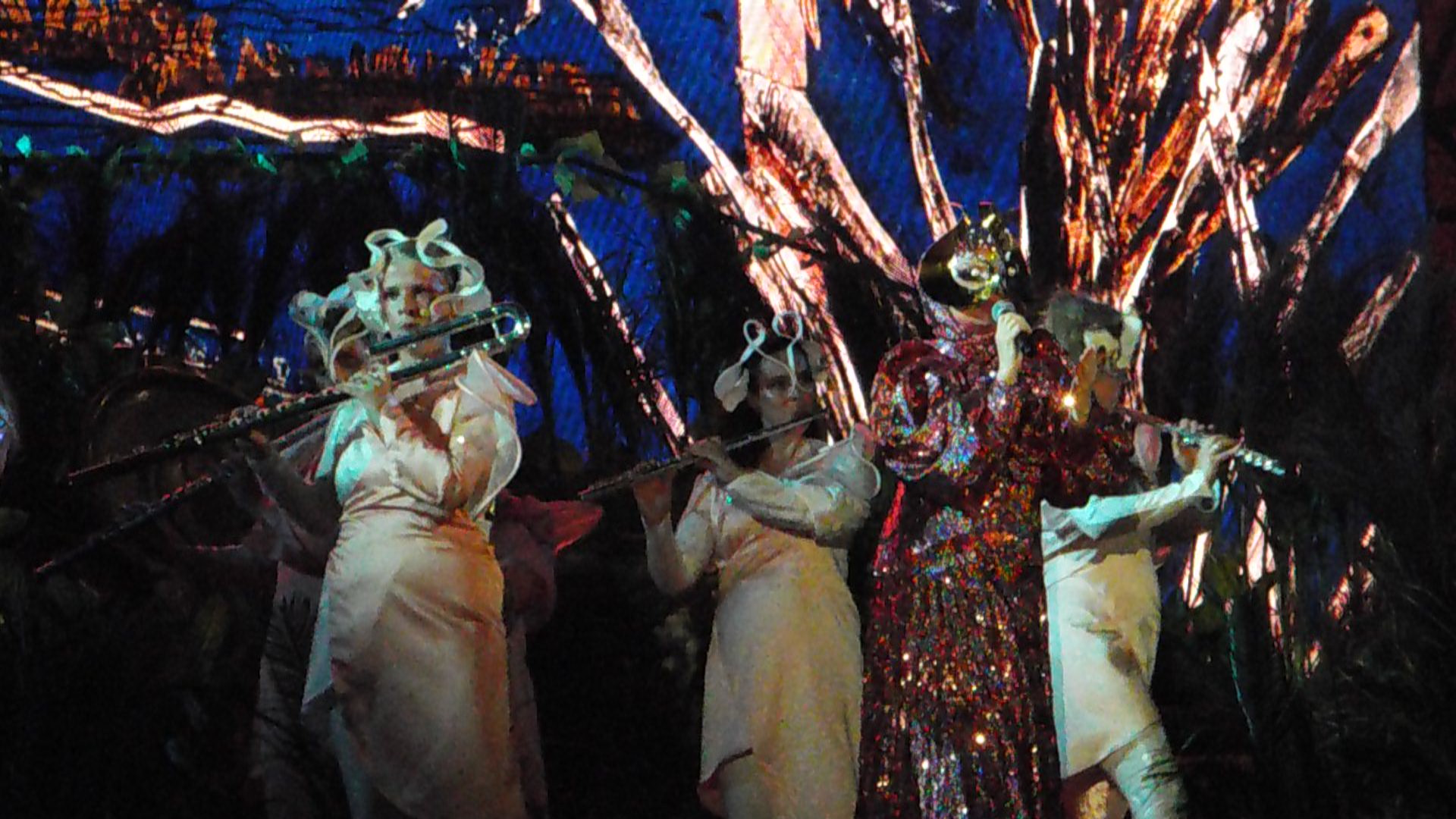
Björk performing at Baths of Caracalla in Rome on 30 July 2018.

Björk's headlined the final day of the first All Points East Festival located in Victoria Park, London as the debut performance of the summer leg of the tour. While billing the Festival as a "rather disparate series of shows", The Guardian journalist Rachel Aroesti praised Björk's performance, describing how "it provided an undoubtedly sublime climax to the weekend". Aroesti went on to recount how technical problems didn't hinder Björk's performance, praising the singer's vocal abilities: "glitchy storms of production juxtaposed against impish flautists and Björk’s unmistakable voice. The latter, both urgent and brittle, ensured that even old hits such as Human Behaviour bristled with life". Likewise, James Eaton from Metro praised the stage design and setlist choices: "with gold glitter mimicking the light of a million fireflies, an angry storm raging over north London in the distance, and a stage covered in flora, fauna and visions of nature, Björk performed songs that spanned her career [...] "Human Behaviour" and "Isobel" from the mid-90s brought familiarity, while the sparse soundscapes of Utopia, with its flutes and soft electronica played up to the conditions and capped one of those summer evenings that make London well worth enduring. The highlight was set closer "Notget", with its mesmerising snare drum rallying through ever-growing layers of Björk’s sublime vocal." Björk's performance at the Primavera Sound in Barcelona received critical praise. El País journalist Luis Hidalgo commended the show by saying "Everything was delicate, everything was tenuous, everything was beautiful, fruit of an imagination that does not work by accumulation of effects, but by the appropriate gradation of them, always seeking to suggest rather than stun". While lauding the show and Björk's voice, Catalan newspaper Ara journalist Xavier Cervantes noted the difficulty of watching the show from a distance as the side screen didn't show the live feed of the concert, rather images of "botanical motifs".

Björk's setlists for major festival dates was noted by several critics, such as Ryan Butcher of The Independent, who noted that people, "expecting to hear "Hyperballad", "Army of Me" and "Declare Independence" - henceforth known as "the hits" - (are) going to be disappointed," though he lauded Björk's song choices and performance as "truly unique" and called her "a world-class artist who stands alone, peerless" and "a one-of-a-kind performer who will never even come close to being equaled, let alone surpassed." Sam Walton of Loud and Quiet wrote, "The setlist draws heavily on Utopia, her newest and toughest record, rarely alighting on anything familiar to the casual Bjork fan, and her vision is clear and pure: this is a show about womanhood, the ecology and human survival and rebirth, told with seriousness, tenderness and huge amounts of passion, and any toe-tapping melodies that happen to creep in along the way should be chalked up as a bonus."

== Broadcasts ==
Björk appeared on the BBC television series Later with Jools Holland on 22 May 2018 after not appearing on TV for 6 years. Her last television appearance was on The Colbert Report in 2012 while promoting Biophilia. Björk last appeared on Later on 22 November 2011 while promoting the aforementioned album. She opened the 2018 show playing the flute along with the all-female Icelandic flute ensemble Viibra in a performance of "Courtship" from the Utopia album and ended it with her 1993 ballad "The Anchor Song" from Debut, newly arranged for flutes. An extended hour long broadcast of the show on 26 May 2018 featured two additional songs, "The Gate" and "Blissing Me".

== Set list ==
In preparation for the tour, Björk has rehearsed 40 songs, and before every show she decides which will be included in the setlist. This set list is from the 30 July 2018 concert in Rome, Italy. It is not intended to represent all concerts for the tour.

1. "Arisen My Senses"
2. "The Gate"
3. "Utopia"
4. "Blissing Me"
5. "Claimstaker"
6. "Isobel"
7. "Courtship"
8. "Human Behaviour"
9. "Tabula Rasa"
10. "Pleasure Is All Mine"
11. "Wanderlust"
12. "Features Creatures"
13. "Losss"
14. "Sue Me"

Encore

15. "The Anchor Song"
16. "Notget"

Other songs performed

- During the rehearsal shows in Reykjavík, "Thunderbolt", "Paradisia" and "Saint" were performed. The latter song was also included during the 27 May 2018 show in London.

== Tour dates ==
List of concerts
Date (2018)	City	Country	Venue	Opening act(s)
9 April^{[A]}	Reykjavík	Iceland	Háskólabíó	—N/a
12 April^{[A]}	Reykjavík	Iceland	Háskólabíó	—N/a
27 May^{[B]}	London	England	Victoria Park	—N/a
31 May^{[C]}	Barcelona	Spain	Parc del Fòrum	—N/a
3 June^{[D]}	Paris	France	Bois de Vincennes	—N/a
7 June^{[E]}	Aarhus	Denmark	Ådalen Aarhus	—N/a
7 July^{[F]}	Cornwall	England	Eden Project	Klein; Lanark Artefax
11 July^{[G]}	Ghent	Belgium	Sint-Pietersplein	Klein; Lanark Artefax
14 July	Rättvik	Sweden	Dalhalla	—N/a
17 July	Helsinki	Finland	Finlandia Hall	—N/a
30 July^{[H]}	Rome	Italy	Terme di Caracalla	—N/a

Notes

^{A} These shows were billed as dress rehearsals
^{B} This concert was part of All Points East
^{C} This concert was part of Primavera Sound 2018
^{D} This concert was part of We Love Green Festival
^{E} This concert was part of NorthSide Festival
^{F} This concert was part of Eden Sessions
^{G} This concert was part of Gent Jazz Festival
^{H} This concert was part of Just Music Festival

=== Cancellations and rescheduled shows ===
13 June 2018	Rome, Italy	Terme di Caracalla	The show was postponed to 30 July 2018 due to bad weather, especially for lightning.
18 August 2018	Paredes de Coura, Portugal	Praia do Taboão	The show was cancelled due to logistical reasons.
