= Þuríður Jónsdóttir =

Icelandic composer and flautist

- Born: March 30, 1967 (age 59); Iceland
- Genre: Contemporary classical
- Occupations: Composer, flautist
- Instrument: Flute

Þuríður Jónsdóttir (born 30 March 1967) is an Icelandic composer and flautist. As a composer, she is known for her inventive combinations of live instruments and electronics, and as a flautist she is a member of the Viibra flute septet.

== Career ==
Þuríður studied flute at the Reykjavík College of Music, and in 1989 moved to Italy to continue her education. She studied composition and electronics at the Bologna Conservatory under Christina Landuzzi, Adriano Guarnieri and Charles Camilleri. She attended a course with Franco Donatoni in 1992, and in 1995–1996 she took lessons in composition with Alessandro Solbiati in Novara. She later moved back to Iceland, where she now lives.

Her works have been performed at festivals in Iceland and Europe, including Présences in Paris, Musica Nova in Copenhagen, and ISCM in Salzburg. And Musica sui più dimensioni in Palermo, as well as the Los Angeles Philharmonic's Reykjavík Festival in 2017, for which she wrote the work Cylinder 49. She has been commissioned to write works for Radio France, the Caput Ensemble and the Iceland Symphony Orchestra, and has composed for renowned soloists such as flautist Mario Caroli (Flutter) and accordionist Geir Draugsvoll (Installation Around a Heart).

Þuríður has received particular praise for her combination of live instruments and electronic sounds in her works. Her flute concerto, Flutter, which was commissioned by RÚV, the Iceland national broadcaster, makes use of insect sounds in combination with amplified solo flute. In INNI - Musica da camera, she employs the sounds of an infant, and in Cylinder 49 she is inspired by old recordings of Icelandic folk singers.

Her compositions have received various nominations and awards. She has received three nominations for the Nordic Council Music Prize: in 2006 (for Flow and Fusion), 2010 (for Í dag er kvöld), and 2012 (for Flutter). She has been nominated for the Icelandic Music Awards five times, for Rauður hringur (2002), Flow and fusion (2004), Solid Hologram (2015), Farvegur (2019), and Leikslok (2022). Her work, Flow and Fusion for orchestra and electronics, was chosen by the International Rostrum of Composers in Paris in 2004 and the 2017 recording by the Iceland Symphony Orchestra has received international praise; critic Richard Allen notes that "its awe-filled, awesome grandeur provides a perfect expansion of its title."

Þuríður is a member of the flute septet Viibra, which grew out of a close collaboration with Björk Guðmundsdóttir on her 2016 album, Utopia. She also performs on Björk's album Fossora, and was part of the Cornucopia project.

Her works are published by Iceland Music.

== Works (selected) ==
- Incerti frammenti (1999)
- Rauður hringur (Red Circle) for choir, vocal soloists, and electronics (2001)
- Flow and Fusion for orchestra (2002)
- Installation Around a Heart for accordion and chamber orchestra (2005)
- Flutter, concerto for flute and orchestra (2008)
- INNI - Musica da camera for baroque violin and electronics (2013)
- Miss Reykjavik Rita for orchestra (2014)
- The CV of a Butterfly for chamber ensemble (2020)
- Leikslok, concerto for violin and orchestra (2021)
- Livia's Room (2022)

== Recordings (selected) ==
- INNI - Musica da camera. On Clockworking. Nordic Affect. Sono Luminus, 2015.
- Crus. On Gríma. Reykjavík Chamber Orchestra, cond. Bernharður Wilkinson. Smekkleysa, 2016.
- Flow and Fusion. On Recurrence. Iceland Symphony Orchestra, cond. Daníel Bjarnason. Sono Luminus, 2017.
- 48 Images of the Moon. On Vernacular. Sæunn Þorsteinsdóttir, cello. Sono Luminus, 2019.
- Flutter. On Occurrence. Mario Caroli, Iceland Symphony Orchestra, cond. Daníel Bjarnason. Sono Luminus, 2021.
