= Hugar =

Icelandic instrumental band

- Origin: Seltjarnarnes, Iceland
- Genres: Contemporary classical; Post-rock; Ambient; Electronic
- Years active: 2013–present
- Labels: Sony Masterworks
- Members: Bergur Þórisson; Pétur Jónsson
- Website: www.hugar.is

Hugar (meaning "minds"; [hʏːɣar̥]) are an Icelandic neo-classical post-rock duo, consisting of multi-instrumentalist composers Bergur Þórisson and Pétur Jónsson from Seltjarnarnes, Iceland.

== History ==
Bergur and Pétur are childhood friends and started the band in 2012. Hugar released their debut album, Hugar, in 2014, featuring Ólafur Arnalds playing drums. It was given out for free online. They signed with Sony and in 2019 their second album Varða was released on Sony Masterworks.

The band performed at Iceland Airwaves in 2017, 2018, and 2019. As of 2019 the band had 50 million plays on Spotify. Bergur and Pétur wrote the score for the 2019 film The Vasulka Effect about artists Steina and Woody Vasulka.

== Discography ==
=== Albums ===
- Hugar (2014)
- Varða (2019)
- Rift (2022)

=== Film scores ===
- The Vasulka Effect (2019)

=== Collaborations ===
- "Waves" (2016, with Arnór Dan Arnarson)
