= And Breathe Normally =

2018 film directed by Ísold Uggadóttir

- Film poster
- Directed by: Ísold Uggadóttir
- Written by: Ísold Uggadóttir
- Produced by: Skúli Malmquist
- Starring: Kristín Þóra Haraldsdóttir; Babetida Sadjo; Patrik Nökkvi Pétursson
- Cinematography: Ita Zbroniec-Zajt
- Edited by: Frédérique Broos
- Music by: Gísli Galdur
- Distributed by: Netflix
- Release dates: 22 January 2018 (Sundance); 9 March 2018 (Iceland)
- Running time: 95 minutes
- Countries: Iceland; Sweden; Belgium
- Language: Icelandic

And Breathe Normally (Icelandic: Andið eðlilega) is a 2018 drama film written and directed by Ísold Uggadóttir. It was screened in the World Cinema Dramatic Competition section at the 2018 Sundance Film Festival, where it received the World Cinema Dramatic Directing Award.

== Plot ==
Lára is a struggling single mother. She has maxed her credit cards, lost her apartment, and is living in her automobile with her six-year-old son, Eldar. She takes a job as a border security trainee with the Reykjanesbær airport police, on the Reykjanes Peninsula. Adja, a traveler from Guinea-Bissau whose girlfriend was killed for being a lesbian, is trying to escape from her country's persecution of homosexuals by seeking asylum in Canada. After Lára flags a discrepancy in Adja's passport, she is separated from her fellow travelers (her daughter and sister) and held in a refugee center until a decision is made about her immigration status. The two women's lives intersect and they form an unlikely bond.

== Cast ==
- Kristín Þóra Haraldsdóttir as Lára
- Babetida Sadjo as Adja
- Patrik Nökkvi Pétursson as Eldar
- Bragi Árnason
- Jakob S. Jónsson
- Sveinn Geirsson
- Helga Vala Helgadóttir
- Þorsteinn Bachmann
- Guðbjörg Thoroddsen
- Sólveig Guðmundsdóttir
- Gunnar Jónsson

== Production ==
And Breathe Normally was produced by Zik Zak Filmworks in Iceland and co-produced by Sweden's Annika Hellström (Cinenic Film) and Belgium's Diana Elbaum (Entre Chien et Loup). It was filmed in Iceland's Reykjanes peninsula in the fall and winter of 2016 over a period of 28 days. Editing took place in Brussels, Belgium where the film was also sound mixed. Color grading was completed at Shoot & Post in Gothenburg, Sweden.

== Release ==
And Breathe Normally held its international premiere at the Sundance Film Festival on 22 January 2018. Its European premiere took place at the Gothenburg Film Festival 2018 in Sweden where And Breathe Normally was awarded the FIPRESCI Award. The film was released theatrically in Iceland on 9 March 2018. The film screened at the San Francisco International LGBTQ Film Festival on 19 June 2018.

And Breathe Normally was released as VOD on Netflix on 4 January 2019, and in Europe on HBO Europe.

== Critical response ==
At its Sundance Film Festival premiere, the critical response was overwhelmingly positive. Screen Daily critic Allan Hunter compared the film to the works of Dardenne brothers and Ken Loach writing: "Deserving of comparisons with the films of the Dardenne brothers or the Ken Loach/Paul Laverty collaborations, And Breathe Normally is all the more impressive for its refusal to inflate drama into melodrama. Circumstances and situations are carefully observed and presented to the viewer without any need to tug at the heartstrings. Uggadottir also secures sympathetic, naturalistic performances from her cast that help to draw the viewer into their lives."

Variety critic Alissa Simon described the film as an "impressively acted social-realist drama." Sheri Linden of The Hollywood Reporter made a point of mentioning Uggadóttir's "sure grasp of naturalistic performance and an eye for character-shaping landscape." The Guardian described And Breathe Normally as "a screening gem", recommending it as "a humane and thoughtful Icelandic drama" in the paper's section which "highlights lesser-known films available to stream." Critic George Fenwick wrote: "For fans of Ken Loach and Andrew Haigh, it is an immensely moving piece of storytelling, focused on the human cost of the cold, unfeeling systems designed to control immigration in the western world." He further commended director Uggadóttir for "humanising issues such as poverty and immigration that are too often told through statistics, brilliantly laying bare the lack of accountability that exists in bureaucratic systems."

Critic Candice Frederick of the New York Times wrote an equally glowing review, illustrating how "the film doesn’t rely on the cinematic clichés that so often arise when two very different people develop an unlikely friendship. Rather, it engages the audience with a deeply resonant narrative that highlights the ways our sense of safe keeping can suddenly be ripped from our grasp. And it reminds us of the power we possess, even when we think we’re helpless." And Breathe Normally was listed as one of 21 must-see debuts by female directors from the last 10 years by the BFI.

On Rotten Tomatoes the film has an approval rating of 94%

== See also ==
- List of Icelandic films
- List of LGBT-related films directed by women
