= Our Father, the Devil =

2021 thriller film

- Directed by: Ellie Foumbi
- Screenplay by: Ellie Foumbi
- Produced by: Ellie Foumbi; Joseph Mastantuono
- Starring: Babetida Sadjo
- Cinematography: Tinx Chan
- Edited by: Roy Clovis
- Music by: Gavin Brivik
- Release date: 2021
- Language: French

Our Father, the Devil (French: Mon père, le diable) is a 2021 American-French thriller drama film written and directed by Ellie Foumbi, in her feature film debut.

The film premiered in the Biennale College - Cinema sidebar at the 78th edition of the Venice Film Festival.

== Plot ==
Marie, a former child soldier from Guinea is now living in France, working as a chef in a small mountain town. Her life seems stable until a priest, Father Patrick, arrives at the local parish. Marie recognizes him as the warlord responsible for unspeakable atrocities from her past. As she confronts her trauma, Marie is torn between seeking revenge and forgiving.

== Cast ==
- Babetida Sadjo as Marie Cissé
- Souléymane Sy Savané as Father Patrick
- Jennifer Tchiakpe as Nadia Benoit
- Franck Saurel as Arnaud Charpentier
- Martine Amisse as Jeanne Guyot
- Maëlle Genet as Sabine Leplanche
- Hiba el Aflahi as Leila Abergel

== Reception ==
On the review aggregator website Rotten Tomatoes, 86% of 14 critics' reviews are positive, with an average rating of 7.8/10.
