= Babetida Sadjo =

Belgian actress (born 1983)

- Born: 19 September 1983 (age 42); Bafatá, Guinea-Bissau
- Occupation: Actress
- Notable work: Waste Land; And Breathe Normally

Babetida Sadjo, born on 19 September 1983 in Bafatá, Guinea-Bissau, is a Belgian actress.

== Biography ==
Babetida grew up in Guinea-Bissau until she was 12 years old, before moving to Hanoi in Vietnam where she attended the Lycée français Alexandre Yersin for 4 years. It was there that she learned French and discovered theater.

Her family moved to Herstal in Belgium where she completed her secondary studies. She continued her theatrical training at the Antoine Vitez Center.

Finally, she moved to Brussels to enter the Royal Conservatory of Brussels and obtained her Dramatic Art diploma in 2007.

It was with Waste Land, in her role as Aysha alongside Jérémie Renier, that she gained national recognition and won the award for Best Supporting Actress at the Ostend Film Festival in 2015.

Her next part was in The Paradise Suite by Joost van Ginkel, but it was her role as Adja, a young illegal immigrant who arrived in Iceland, in And Breathe Normally by Ísold Uggadóttir that she began her international career.

She was also a member of the jury of the Liège International Crime Film Festival in 2018.

Her most recent role is in the 2020 Netflix TV show Into the Night.

== Filmography ==
- 2009 : Protect and Serve by Éric Lavaine : The hospital hostess
- 2012 : Ombline de Stéphane Cazes : Supervisor Elsa
- 2013 : 9 Month Stretch by Albert Dupontel : The victim of the sink
- 2014 : Waste Land by Pieter Van Hees : Aysha Tshimanga
- 2015 : The Paradise Suite by Joost van Ginkel : Angele
- 2017 : And Breathe Normally by Ísold Uggadóttir : Adja
- 2023 : Our Father, the Devil by Ellie Foumbi : Marie Cissé
- 2023: Time Out by Ève Duchemin : Édith
- 2023: Amal by Jawad Rhalib : Sylvie
- 2023: Lumumba: The Return of a Hero: narrator

== Awards ==
=== Won ===
- 2015 : Ensors 2015 - Best Supporting Actress for Waste Land

=== Nominated ===
- 2016 : Magritte 2016 - Best Supporting Actress for Waste Land
