= Tomihiro Kono =

Japanese hairdresser and wigmaker (born 1980)

- 河野富広
- Born: 1980 (age 45–46); Ehime Prefecture, Shikoku, Japan
- Occupations: Hairdresser, wigmaker

Tomihiro Kono (born 1980) is a Japanese hairdresser, head prop designer, and wigmaker. He first became known for his hairdressing and head props before becoming a full-time wig maker in 2017. He has published four photobooks on his wigs.

== Biography ==
Kono was born in 1980 in Ehime Prefecture to mandarin orange farmers who expected him to study agriculture and become a farmer. However, according to him, from a young age he was interested in harajuku fashion and dreamed of becoming a pet hairdresser in Tokyo. His parents ultimately recommended he become a hairdresser for humans instead.

He trained as a hairdresser in Osaka before moving to Tokyo in the late 1990s to work as a hairdresser in a harajuku salon. He then spent ten years training on traditional Japanese haircutting and hairstyling techniques, including geisha techniques and the takeshimada. He moved to London in 2007. That same year, he also began creating head props. He made his solo debut appearance at London Fashion Week in 2010. In 2013, he moved to New York, where he has since been based.

He created his namesake label Tomikono Wigs in 2016, and the same year founded artist-run platform konomad. He became a fulltime wig maker in 2017. All of his wigs are handmade. He has stated he believes "our hairstyle allows us to create our identity."

He has collaborated with Björk, where he did the wigs for her Cornucopia tour, Karen O, Grimes, Maison Margiela, Marc Jacobs, and Kiko Kostadinov. His first major collaboration was with Junya Watanabe. Notable fans of his work include Isamaya Ffrench and Tetsuko Kuroyanagi. He is also known for his Instagram account, where he posts images of his wigs. His work has appeared on the covers of Vogue, W, and T and on a robot in Japan.

He has published four photobooks: His 2017 book, Head Prop: Studies 2013–2016, focuses on his head props. His 2020 book Personas 111 features one model wearing 111 wigs. His 2023 book Fancy Creatures documents nature-themed wigs from 2020 to 2022. His most recent is Space Creatures, published in 2026, which documents his 2022-2025 series of "creature wigs" with extraterrestrial and celestial themes.
