= Ísold Uggadóttir =

Icelandic film director

- Born: Reykjavík, Iceland
- Occupation(s): Director, screenwriter, producer

Ísold Uggadóttir is an Icelandic film director and screenwriter. She is known for her feature film debut in And Breathe Normally, for which she won the World Cinema Dramatic Directing Award at the 2018 Sundance Film Festival.

== Life and career ==
Ísold was born in Reykjavík. She earned her M.F.A. in directing and screenwriting from Columbia University School of the Arts. Her directorial debut short film, Family Reunion (Góðir gestir), was an official selection of the 2007 Sundance Film Festival. She subsequently directed the short films Committed (Njálsgata), Clean and Revolution Reykjavík (Útrás Reykjavík).

Ísold's debut feature film And Breathe Normally, premiered at the Sundance Film Festival in 2018 and later released on Netflix in January 2019.

In 2025, she directed Cornucopia, a concert film chronicling Icelandic artist Björk's performance in Lisbon during her Cornucopia tour.

== Filmography ==
Year	Title	Contribution	Note
2006	Family Reunion (Góðir gestir)	Writer/Director/Editor	Short film
2009	Committed (Njálsgata)	Writer/Director/Editor/Producer	Short film
2010	Clean	Writer/Director/Editor	Short film
2011	Revolution Reykjavík (Útrás Reykjavík)	Writer/Director/Editor/Producer	Short film
2018	And Breathe Normally (Andið eðlilega)	Writer/Director/Co-Producer	Feature film
2025	Cornucopia	Director	Concert film

== Awards and nominations ==
Year	Result	Award	Category	Work	Ref.
2007	Won	Rhode Island International Film Festival	Alternative Spirit Award	Family Reunion	
2007	Won	Atlanta Film Festival	Best Narrative Short	Family Reunion	
2007	Won	MIX Copenhagen	Best Short Film	Family Reunion	
2010	Won	Edda Awards	Short Film of the Year	Committed	
2011	Won	Edda Awards	Short Film of the Year	Clean	
2012	Won	Drama International Short Film Festival	Honorary Distinction	Revolution Reykjavík	
2012	Won	Valladolid International Film Festival	Best Short Film	Revolution Reykjavík	
2018	Won	Gothenburg Film Festival	FIPRESCI Award	And Breathe Normally	
2018	Won	Hamptons International Film Festival	Best Film	And Breathe Normally	
2018	Won	Sundance Film Festival	World Cinema Dramatic Directing Award	And Breathe Normally	
2018	Won	Traverse City Film Festival	Best Narrative	And Breathe Normally	
2020	Won	Chlotrudis Society for Independent Film	Best Director	And Breathe Normally	
