= Utopia (Björk album) =

Studio album by Björk
- Released: 24 November 2017
- Recorded: 2015–2017
- Genres: Avant-garde; folktronica
- Length: 71:38
- Label: One Little Indian
- Producers: Björk; Arca; Rabit

Björk chronology
Vulnicura Live (2015)	Utopia (2017)	Country Creatures (2019)

Singles from Utopia
- 1. "The Gate" Released: 15 September 2017; 2. "Blissing Me" Released: 15 November 2017; 3. "Arisen My Senses" Released: 21 March 2018

Utopia is the ninth (Note: Utopia is officially considered to be Björk's ninth album. However, this is the tenth solo album if her self-titled 1977 album is included, or her eleventh album if her 1990 jazz album Gling-Gló with tríó Guðmundar Ingólfssonar is also included.) studio album by Icelandic singer-musician Björk. It was primarily produced by Björk and Venezuelan electronic record producer Arca, and released on 24 November 2017 through One Little Indian Records in the United Kingdom and The Orchard Enterprises in the United States. The album was acclaimed by music critics for its production, songwriting and Björk's vocals, and later received a nomination for Best Alternative Music Album at the 61st Annual Grammy Awards, becoming Björk's eighth consecutive nomination in the category.

== Background and release ==
"I kind of like the fact that it's a cliché, that word [...] it has a fascistic, 'I want the world to be like this!' feeling about it, because it's a proposal (of) how we can live with nature and technology in the most optimistic way possible."

— Björk on the album's title

Björk began working on Utopia soon after releasing Vulnicura in 2015. Upon winning the award for International Female Solo Artist at the 2016 Brit Awards, Björk did not appear as she was busy recording her new album. In an interview published in March 2016, Björk likened the writing to "paradise" as opposed to Vulnicura being "hell... like divorce". Speaking to The Fader in March 2017, filmmaker and collaborator Andrew Thomas Huang said that he had been involved with Björk on her new album, stating that "quite a bit of it" had already been written, and that the "new album's gonna be really future-facing, in a hopeful way that I think is needed right now."

Utopia was announced via social media on 2 August 2017 with a handwritten note by Björk. The announcement coincided with Dazed's autumn 2017 cover issue with Björk which included the announcement of few song titles. The lead single, "The Gate" was announced on 12 September for a digital release the following week but received a surprise midnight release on 15 September. The same day of the single's release, Björk announced the album's title, Utopia, during an interview with Nowness, stating she had "a thousand name suggestions" and "couldn't think of anything better" but it was open to change. The release date of 24 November and cover art were unveiled on 31 October. Jesse Kanda, Arca's frequent collaborator and director of Björk's "Mouth Mantra" music video designed the cover, which incorporated a silicone mask designed by frequent collaborator and mask maker James T. Merry. However, the makeup was done by Berlin-based drag queen Hungry. Jade Gomez of The Fader described the cover as "having a sense of eerily detached femininity."

On 15 November 2017, Utopia's second single, "Blissing Me", was released as a digital download only, accompanied by a music video, directed by Tim Walker and Emma Dalzell, was released the following day.

The album was released on 24 November 2017, with those who purchased the album receiving cryptocurrency in the form of 100 audiocoins (with a value of about $0.19), through a partnership with British blockchain startup Blockpool.

While promoting Utopia, Björk revealed that she plans working on a live version of the album beginning in the spring of 2018. "There were a lot of flute things I didn't completely explore," she said, "like more soloists and mysterious kind of flute playing," and added "We have some additional flute songs and some different kind of angles."

On 16 August 2019, nearly two years after the album was released, Björk announced the Utopia Bird Call Boxset as a way to celebrate the end of the Utopia era, a collection featuring 14 hand-carved wooden flutes that imitate various bird calls. Björk personally selected each type of flute, working with a French company called Quelle Est Belle, and the set comes with a booklet detailing how to use each flute and which bird it imitates. In addition to the flutes, the box set comes with a custom-made USB stick that features the music of Utopia, the Utopia music videos and remixes, and an exclusive unreleased instrumental track called "Arpeggio". In a statement, Björk explained, "Utopia is so much about birdsong and sonically [sic] the mutation between synth/bird, bird/flute, flute/synth... so I got very excited when i found these handmade wooden flutes imitating precisely particular birds." The set is valued at £500 and was released on 3 December 2019.

== Composition ==
Utopia is an avant-garde and folktronica album. With fourteen tracks in total, the album clocks in at 71 minutes and 38 seconds, making it the longest of Björk's studio albums to date. The first comprehensive media coverage on the album came from an article published by Dazed. Björk stated that the album is an exploration of utopia, with its writing process coinciding with her own personal, political and environmental concerns. She made headlines by describing the record as her "Tinder album". She later clarified her comment, saying that the album would cover a different emotional terrain than her last record which she constantly referred to as her heartbreak album.

"I obviously saw a gigantic musician in [Arca], and I felt that [s]he had gone into my world with such elegance and dignity and interpreted it, helped me [with] what was there, that I wanted to meet on a more equal basis. Of course it is my album for sure... but just as a pure musician, we decided to enter this other world and this other island which is the Arca/Björk overlap."

— Björk on her collaborative process with Arca on Utopia

The Dazed article revealed just how involved Arca, co-producer on Vulnicura, was on Utopia. Unlike their previous collaboration where Arca came on board after all the songs and string arrangements were written, the new album saw them collaborating from the start. Arca had encouraged her to pursue a direction she'd hinted at on obscure cuts like "Batabid", a "Pagan Poetry" B-side, and "Ambergris March" from Drawing Restraint 9. According to Björk, their collaboration was "a musical conversation that was cross-generational, cross-Atlantic, h[er] encouraging me to go into this area that I sort of suggested years ago, but didn't necessarily go all the way".

Björk said that air was a conscious, stylistic choice for the album after frequently composing for strings arrangements in her previous work: "I started a 12 piece Icelandic flute section and spent a few months recording and rehearsing with them [...] We decided to have synths that have a lot of air sounds in them and flutes that sound synthy." She said the melodies were composed while out walking in the Icelandic wilderness, and once she had completed the melodies, she wrote the flute arrangements, later superimposing melodies. The lyrics were the final element in the songwriting process. The Dazed article went on to reveal that the tranquil sounds of bird calls bridge a number of the tracks together, a similar flourish to her 2007 album, Volta. These sounds came from original field recordings by Björk herself but were also sampled from Jean C. Roché's 1973 album, Oiseaux du Vénézuéla, which Björk considers as one of her favorite albums.

The Dazed article revealed many song titles including lead single "The Gate". "'The Gate' is essentially a love song," says Björk, "but I say 'love' in a more transcendent way. Vulnicura was about a very personal loss, and I think this new album is about a love that's even greater. It's about rediscovering love – but in a spiritual way, for lack of a better word." Two additional song titles were released by Dazed, "Losss" and "Features Creatures". "Losss" was co-produced by Texas-based producer Rabit, who stated that the song was his first outside production work, and that the song serves a reminder of "how force of will is the ultimate force". "Features Creatures" talks about seeing someone with the same accent as a lover.

In an interview with Harpcolumn.com, harpist Katie Buckley revealed that the songs "Arisen My Senses" and "Blissing Me" were recorded over two years before the album's release, and she was not even sure those songs would appear on the final record. "The final harp part on 'Losss' was recorded this past summer," she revealed, and it was not until "Blissing Me" was released as a single a week before the album's release date that she got to hear the finished song. "I was completely surprised and quite excited by how exposed the harp was! When you're just recording with click track, you really just have no idea. I have done a lot of wonderful things here in Iceland, but this is one of the coolest!" She said that Björk composed all the harp parts and Buckley's work was predominately as performer but also editor, revealing that originally "Blissing Me" was written for a harp trio but she suggested that a harp quartet would better capture what Björk was trying to accomplish.

In an interview published on The Creative Independent on 14 December 2017, Björk revealed that there were initially two different versions of the studio album, one without birdsong and with each song separated by silence as in a traditional studio album and the final version as released with birdsong and many of the tracks cross-fading into each other.

== Promotion ==
=== Singles ===
By the end of 2017, two singles had been released from the album, both prior to Utopia's 24 November release date. The first was "The Gate", released digitally and on limited edition single-sided black vinyl. The single version is slightly different from the final album mix, with the bird song that accompanies the flute and vocal intro absent. The vinyl version is different still, with an additional 54-second flute instrumental outro added at the end of the song.

Utopia's second single, "Blissing Me", was released a week before the album released. A month later, on 13 December 2017, a two track "Blissing Me" remix EP was released featuring two new mixes, the first of which was a collaboration with Brooklyn singer Serpentwithfeet who contributes new lyrics and beats to the track. Björk had previously praised the singer in a September 2016 article with The Guardian. The second remix was a "Harp Only" version of "Blissing Me" which has been described as "heavenly" by Consequence of Sound. A limited edition turquoise vinyl version of the "Blissing Me" remixes was released in February 2018.

The third single "Arisen My Senses" was released on 21 March 2018, with a remix EP featuring three remixes from Lanark artefax, Jlin and Kelly Lee Owens. A vinyl release of the EP was released on 25 May.

On 6 September 2019, two remixes of "Features Creatures" were released as digital singles, one by Fever Ray and the other by the Knife. Both remixes, as well as Björk's own remix of Fever Ray's 2017 song, "This Country", are collected in a limited-edition 12-inch EP titled Country Creatures, released on 1 November 2019.

=== Music videos ===
The first two music videos from Utopia accompanied the album's first two singles, "The Gate" and "Blissing Me". "The Gate" was directed by Björk's frequent collaborator Andrew Thomas Huang and debuted to critical acclaim, eventually being named the best music video of 2017 by Pitchfork. Of the video, Huang said, "'The Gate' picks up where 2015's Vulnicura left off. It is the first glimpse into Björk's utopia. The doorway lies within the wound from Vulnicura, which now appears transformed into a prismatic portal channeled between the chests of two lovers. Not lovers in the quotidian romantic sense, but in a broader cosmological way... "The Gate" is a declaration of hope sung by a woman refracted and re-formed into a luminous whole". He went on to describe the experience as the "culmination of my five-year collaboration with Björk".

"Blissing Me" was directed by Tim Walker and Emma Dalzell. Critics noted the video's simplicity when compared to the VR experiments of the Vulnicura videos and heavy reliance on CGI on "The Gate". Fashion magazine Vogue praised this quality, declaring it "one of her most restrained moments in recent memory... despite her Gucci platforms". In addition to her yellow Gucci shoes, Björk wears a ruffled, blue semi-sheer tulle jumpsuit by British designer Pam Hogg. James Merry, frequent Björk collaborator/mask maker, adorned her braids with flowers and other delicate ornaments. Björk's makeup was the work of Berlin-based drag artist Hungry, who also collaborated in the album's cover art.

A third music video, "Utopia", was released on 8 December 2017. It was directed by Warren Du Preez and Nick Thornton Jones and features Björk "in yet another one of her fantastical worlds, this one populated by flutes and blue birds and soft pink viscera." In comparing the video for "Utopia" against the album's previous two videos, Hanna Flemming of Paste said, "Björk finally gives us what is most nearly the living room or gathering valley of this (utopian) realm, fully-fledged, realized and picturesque."

The fourth music video from Utopia was of the album's opening track, "Arisen My Senses". It depicts Björk's rebirth with "the singer emerging from a womb, before entering a fantasy world as a fiery, feathered, winged creature" and has been described as "artfully disturbing". The video was made in close collaboration between Björk, director Jesse Kanda, with whom the Icelandic singer had collaborated on the video for Vulnicura's 2015 music video for "Mouth Mantra", and Arca, Utopia's co-producer. The video was presented by WeTransfer and debuted on their site on 18 December 2017. It was described as "her hottest (music video) to date" by Paste but Arca's appearance in the video was criticised by her fanbase. Both Björk and Arca addressed the controversy, with Arca writing on Instagram, "so many comments from ppl saying i should stay away from björk, ruined the arisen video by appearing or whatever .. when i've clicked thru to ur profiles i've only found faces that look sweet, soft body language and tender eyed selfies! to you: i send a soft kiss back" [sic]. Björk replied to Arca's message later, comparing Arca's appearance in the video to the late British musician Mark Bell's appearance in her 2008 video for "Declare Independence", both of whom co-wrote the respective songs: "I am surprised why some of my fans have a difficulty with this," and asked fans "be open minded to the complexities of musical union between generations and different sexual orientations. Making this video with Jesse Kanda was a precious signage for us to recognize collaborations across all those."

On 10 May 2019, Björk released the music video for "Tabula Rasa". It was directed by Tobias Gremmler who created the digital back drops and projections for her 2019 tour Cornucopia. Gremmler offered some description on his concept, saying, "The visual transformation of Björk into faun-like flowers and mountainous landscapes embodies the utopian concept of a harmonious coexistence between nature and human based on empathy." In a social media post, Björk revealed her "sublime gratitude for (her) 18 months of work" with Gremmler and "the ambiguity of that meeting point between a song and a moving image."

On 6 August 2019, the music video / digital projection for "Losss" premiered on YouTube, again directed by Gremmler, which Rolling Stone called "mind-bending". Björk stated that, "No one captures digital sensuality like (Gremmler), elegant and expressive!" and added that the visuals were based "on the conversations between our inner optimist and pessimist. When I recorded this I tried to sing in a deeper tone for one of them in the left speaker and a higher optimist in the right. And if you listen on headphones it will match the imagery." The video was originally conceived for multiple screens for the live Cornucopia show.

=== Tours ===
On 30 October 2017, Björk was announced as one of the headliners for the All Points East music festival in London. She was scheduled to perform on 27 May 2018, her first confirmed live gig of the Utopia tour. On 2 November, another live date was announced, this time at the Aarhus in Denmark as part of the Northside Festival, to be held on 7 June 2018. Björk first performed at Aarhus on 9 September 1993, the third night of her first concert tour as a solo artist. The Utopia tour began, however, with two special dress rehearsals in Reykjavík, Iceland on 9 and 12 April 2018, which opened to positive reviews from the Icelandic press.

11 months after the final Utopia tour concert, Björk unveiled her new live show Cornucopia at New York's brand new Hudson Yards venue, The Shed, where she continued exploring Utopia's live potential with the same musicians that joined her for the Utopia tour in addition to the renowned Icelandic choir Hamrahlíðarkórinn plus a series of visual and theatrical artists that included graphic designer Tobias Gremmler and Argentinian film director Lucrecia Martel. Björk's Cornucopia opened on 9 May 2019 to positive reviews.

=== Promotional appearances ===
Björk appeared on the BBC television series Later... with Jools Holland on 22 May 2018 after a break of six years from performing on TV. Her last television appearance was during the second year of the Biophilia tour in 2012 when she appeared on The Colbert Report and sang "Cosmogony", the second single from Biophilia which was released eight months prior to the show's taping. Björk last appeared on Later on 22 November 2011 where she performed a set of three songs from the then just released Biophilia. An extended hour-long broadcast of the show on 26 May featured two additional songs, "The Gate" and "Blissing Me".

== Critical reception ==
Professional ratings
Aggregate scores
Source	Rating
AnyDecentMusic?	7.5/10
Metacritic	82/100
Review scores
Source	Rating
AllMusic	4/5 stars
The A.V. Club	A
Chicago Tribune	3.5/4 stars
Entertainment Weekly	B+
The Guardian	3/5 stars
NME	4/5 stars
The Observer	4/5 stars
Pitchfork	8.4/10
Q	4/5 stars
Rolling Stone	4/5 stars

Utopia was met with widespread critical acclaim. At Metacritic, which assigns a normalised rating out of 100 to reviews from mainstream publications, the album received an average score of 82, based on 35 reviews. Aggregator AnyDecentMusic? gave it 7.5 out of 10, based on their assessment of the critical consensus.

Reviewing Utopia for The Boston Globe, Terence Cawley found that the "both resolutely avant-garde and absolutely beautiful" album showcases Björk and Arca "pushing each other to create something entirely unique". In The A.V. Club, Kelsey J. Waite wrote that Arca's presence does not detract from the album's "seamlessness" with Björk's past work, while noting that "the duo's experiments never come off as indulgent; they feel like physical, necessary expressions of the album's elemental emotions". Kitty Empire of The Observer stated that Utopia largely eschews the "austere, extreme" themes of Vulnicura and instead "harkens back to the nature love of older albums such as Biophilia and Vespertine, and the default lust for life Björk has exhibited throughout her long career", while Will Hermes of Rolling Stone remarked that it "radiates playfulness and pleasure". Heather Phares of AllMusic found that lyrically, the album is not "quite as idyllic as its title implies, but its mix of idealism and realism makes it an even greater success as a manifesto for radically open love and as a document of thriving after loss." Spin's Winston Cook-Wilson called the album "full-on music-theater unlike anything Björk has yet attempted" and credited Björk for managing to "surprise with unforced and meaningful reinvention".

Describing Utopia as "almost completely a sensory experience", Leah Greenblatt of Entertainment Weekly was more reserved in her praise, remarking that the album's focus on soundscapes rendered it less accessible than Björk's 1990s and early 2000s output, despite commending Björk's continued artistic reinvention. The Daily Telegraph critic Neil McCormick found that the album lacked the emotional focus of Vulnicura, adding that its concept of "women fleeing patriarchy to form an eco-island community" was largely indecipherable from the lyrics. Alexis Petridis of The Guardian felt that despite the "enormous amount of thought and care... expended on the sound of the album", it lacks strong melodies to anchor several of its tracks.

=== Accolades ===
Publication	Accolade	Rank	Ref.
AllMusic	Best of 2017	—N/a	
Baeble Music	Top 30 Albums of 2017	11	
Dazed	The 20 Best Albums of 2017	7	
Drowned in Sound	Favourite Albums of 2017	15	
Crack Magazine	Albums of the Year 2017	24	
Mixmag	Top 50 Albums of 2017	12	
The Wild Honey Pie	Top 30 Albums of 2017	4	
Under the Radar	Top 100 Albums of 2017	31	
The Quietus	Albums of the Year 2017	31	
Diffuser	Top 25 Albums of 2017	14	
God is in the TV	Top 50 Albums of 2017	20	
NOW Magazine	The 10 Best Albums of 2017	6	
The A.V. Club	20 Best Albums of 2017	15	
Spin	50 Best Albums of 2017	29	
The New Yorker	Amanda Petrusich's Ten Best Albums of 2017	—N/a	
Earbuddy	100 Best Albums of 2017	30	
Tiny Mix Tapes	Favorite 50 Music Releases of 2017	21	
Gigwise	51 Best Albums of 2017	27	
The New York Times	Jon Pareles' Best Albums of 2017	5	
Pitchfork	The 50 Best Albums of 2017	20	
The 405	Top 20 Albums of 2017	16	
Rough Trade	Best Albums of the Year 2017	3	
Slant Magazine	The 25 Best Albums of 2017	11	
Double J	The 50 Best Albums of 2017	24	
Stereogum	The 50 Best Albums of 2017	28	
Albumism	50 Best Albums of 2017	8	
The Vinyl Factory	The 50 Best Albums of 2017	50	
Slate	Best Albums of 2017	—N/a	
Les Inrockuptibles	100 Best Albums of 2017	48	
Radio X	The 30 Best New Albums of 2017	—N/a	
The Genius Community	50 Best Albums of 2017	28	
FACT	50 Best Albums of 2017	40	
Junkee	10 Best Albums of 2017	7	
BrooklynVegan	Top 50 Albums of 2017	42	
Vinyl Me, Please	The 30 Best Albums of 2017	21	

== Chart performance ==
Utopia peaked at number 75 on the Billboard 200 chart in the US. It debuted at number 25 in the UK and at number 48 on Japan's Oricon Weekly Albums chart with 1,593 copies sold in its first week of release in Japan.

== Track listing ==
All lyrics written by Björk; all tracks produced by Björk and Arca, except where noted.

Utopia – Standard digital and CD edition
No.	Title	Music	Length
1.	"Arisen My Senses"	Björk; Arca	4:59
2.	"Blissing Me"	Björk	5:05
3.	"The Gate"	Björk; Arca	6:33
4.	"Utopia"	Björk	4:42
5.	"Body Memory"	Björk	9:46
6.	"Features Creatures" (producer: Björk)	Björk; Sarah Hopkins	4:49
7.	"Courtship"	Björk	4:44
8.	"Losss" (producers: Björk, Rabit, Arca)	Björk	6:51
9.	"Sue Me"	Björk; Arca	4:57
10.	"Tabula Rasa"	Björk	4:42
11.	"Claimstaker"	Björk; Arca	3:18
12.	"Paradisia" (producer: Björk)	Björk	1:44
13.	"Saint"	Björk	4:41
14.	"Future Forever"	Björk; Arca	4:47
Total length:			71:38

Utopia – Bird Call Boxset edition USB bonus tracks
No.	Title	Music	Length
15.	"Arpeggio" (producer: Björk)	Björk	4:15
16.	"Arisen My Senses" (Lanark Artefax Remix)		5:12
17.	"Arisen My Senses" (Jlin Rework)		3:27
18.	"Arisen My Senses" (Kelly Lee Owens Remix)		6:38
19.	"Blissing Me" (featuring serpentwithfeet)		4:16
20.	"Blissing Me" (Harp Version)		5:05
21.	"Features Creatures" (Fever Ray Remix)		4:08
22.	"Features Creatures" (The Knife Remix)		4:37
Total length:			109:25

Utopia – Vinyl edition Side one
No.	Title	Length
1.	"Arisen My Senses"	5:01
2.	"Blissing Me"	5:05
3.	"The Gate"	6:33

Side two
No.	Title	Length
1.	"Body Memory"	10:12
2.	"Losss"	7:13

Side three
No.	Title	Length
1.	"Utopia"	4:45
2.	"Saint"	4:39
3.	"Courtship"	4:52
4.	"Sue Me"	4:57

Side four
No.	Title	Length
1.	"Tabula Rasa"	4:42
2.	"Claimstaker"	3:19
3.	"Paradisia"	1:42
4.	"Features Creatures"	4:41
5.	"Future Forever"	4:46
Total length:		72:27

Sample credits

- The album contains various bird song samples from Jean C. Roché album Oiseaux du Vénézuéla (1973) and Icelandic field recordings by Chris Watson.
- "Arisen My Senses" includes an interpolation of "Little Now a Lot" (2012), by Arca.
- "Features Creatures" includes an original composition by Sarah Hopkins called Kindred Spirits, Music for Harmonic Whirlies (1996).
- "Courtship" includes an original recording by Ragnar Johnson and Jessica Mayer, called "Mo-Mo", included in Sacred Flute Music From New Guinea: Madang / Windim Mabu (2016).

== Personnel ==
Credits adapted from the liner notes of Utopia.

=== Musicians ===
- Björk – vocals, digital flute, flute arrangements, vocal arrangements, choir arrangements, cello arrangements
- Arca – electronics, synth melodies, beats
- Flute section
  - Melkorka Ólafsdóttir (solo), Áshildur Haraldsdóttir (solo), Berglind María Tómasdóttir (solo), Steinunn Vala Pálsdóttir, Björg Brjánsdóttir, Þuríður Jónsdóttir, Pamela De Sensi, Sigríður Hjördís Indriðadóttir, Emilía Rós Sigfúsdóttir, Dagný Marinósdóttir, Sólveig Magnúsdóttir, Berglind Stefánsdóttir, Hafdís Vigfúsdóttir
- Katie Buckley – harp
- Hamrahlíðarkórinn – choir
- Þorgerður Ingólfsdóttir – choir conduction
- Robin Carolan – the fifth ear
- Júlia Mogensen – cello
- Hávarður Tryggvason – contra bass

=== Technical personnel ===
- Heba Kadry – mixing (tracks 2, 5–8, 11)
- Marta Salogni – mixing (tracks 1, 3, 4, 9, 10, 12–14), vocal mixing (tracks 2, 8)
- Bergur Þórisson – engineering, flute recording engineering, choir recording engineering, harp recording engineering
- Bart Migal – engineering
- Chris Elms – engineering, harp recording engineering
- Mandy Parnell – mastering

=== Artwork ===
- Björk – creative direction, cover character
- Jesse Kanda – creative direction, cover art, photography
- James Merry – creative direction, facepiece
- Raphael Salley – hair
- Hungry – make-up
- Juliette Larthe – production
- Ken Kohl – avian fetus photography
- M/M Paris – creative direction, typography, digital illumination

== Charts ==
Chart performance for Utopia
Chart (2017)	Peak position
Australian Albums (ARIA)	22
Austrian Albums (Ö3 Austria)	23
Belgian Albums (Ultratop Flanders)	18
Belgian Albums (Ultratop Wallonia)	34
Czech Albums (ČNS IFPI)	40
Dutch Albums (Album Top 100)	29
Finnish Albums (Suomen virallinen lista)	40
French Albums (SNEP)	31
German Albums (Offizielle Top 100)	26
Icelandic Albums (Tónlistinn)	3
Irish Albums (IRMA)	31
Italian Albums (FIMI)	34
Japanese Albums (Oricon)	48
New Zealand Heatseeker Albums (RMNZ)	3
Portuguese Albums (AFP)	10
Scottish Albums (Official Charts)	27
Spanish Albums (Promusicae)	24
Swedish Albums (Sverigetopplistan)	28
Swiss Albums (Schweizer Hitparade)	12
UK Albums (Official Charts)	25
UK Independent Albums (Official Charts)	10
US Billboard 200	75
US Independent Albums (Billboard)	4
US Top Alternative Albums (Billboard)	3
US Indie Store Album Sales (Billboard)	2
