= Tim Walker =

British fashion photographer

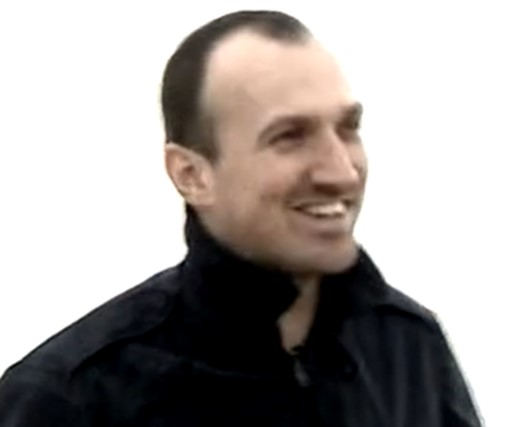
- Born: 1970 (age 55–56)
- Education: Exeter College of Art and Design
- Occupation: Photographer
- Years active: 1994 - Present
- Notable work: Wonderful Things exhibition at the Victoria and Albert Museum, Harry Styles' Fine Line album photoshoot

Timothy Walker HonFRPS (born 1970) is a British fashion photographer who regularly works for Vogue, W and Love magazines. He is based in London.

== Life and career ==
Walker was born in England in 1970. His interest in photography began at the Condé Nast library in London where he worked on the Cecil Beaton archive for a year before college. After obtaining an HBC in Photography at Exeter College of Art and Design, Walker was awarded a third prize as The Independent Young Photographer Of The Year.

Upon leaving college in 1994, Walker worked as a freelance photographic assistant in London before moving to New York City as a full-time assistant to Richard Avedon. When he returned to England, he initially concentrated on portrait and documentary work for British newspapers. At the age of 25 he shot his first fashion story for Vogue, and has photographed for the British, Italian, and American editions. He has also shot notable covers for W Magazine, i-D, Vanity Fair, Another Man, and Better Homes and Gardens Magazine.

In 2019, Walker photographed the album artwork for Harry Styles' second album, Fine Line.

Walker's Wonderful Things exhibition at the Victoria and Albert Museum, London in 2019–2020 consisted of 10 rooms containing new projects, each one inspired by various artefacts from the V&A. Over the course of three years, Walker visited the V&A’s numerous storerooms, met with curators and technicians, even scaled the roof of the museum and climbed through the Victorian passages underneath it, in search of the items that would inspire each series.

== Exhibitions ==
- Pictures, Design Museum, London, 2008
- Story Teller, Somerset House, London, 2012–2013
- Dreamscapes, Bowes Museum, Durham, UK, 2013. Curated by Greville Worthington. Work beyond the pages of Vogue and Vanity Fair.
- Wonderful Things, Victoria and Albert Museum, London, 2019–2020, Galleries 38 and 38a
- Wonderful People, Michael Hoppen Gallery, London, 2019–2020

== Publications ==
Walker's book The Garden of Earthly Delights was inspired by the Hieronymous Bosch painting of the same name.

- Tim Walker. Stern Portfolio. teNeues, 2006. ISBN 3570196860
- Pictures. teNeues, 2008. ISBN 3832733280
- The Lost Explorer. teNeues, 2011. ISBN 9783832794460
- Story Teller. Thames & Hudson, 2012. ISBN 9780500544204.
- The Granny Alphabet. Thames & Hudson, 2013. ISBN 9780500544266.
- The Garden of Earthly Delights.
- Shoot for the Moon. Thames & Hudson, 2019. ISBN 9780500545027.
- Wonderful Things, V&A 2019, ISBN 9781851779710.

== Films ==
=== Short films directed by Walker ===
- The Lost Explorer (BBC Films, 2010)
- The Mechanical Man of the Moon (2014)
- The Muse (2014)
- The Magic Paintbrush (2016)

=== Music videos co-directed by Walker ===
- "Blissing Me" (2017) by Björk – co-directed with Emma Dalzell

== Awards ==
- Isabella Blow award for Fashion Creator from The British Fashion Council, 2008
- Infinity Award from the International Center of Photography, New York City, 2009
- Best short film, Chicago United Film Festival, 2011, for The Lost Explorer
- Honorary Fellowship from The Royal Photographic Society, 2012

== Collections ==
Walker's work is held in the following permanent collections:

- Victoria and Albert Museum, London: 9 prints (as of 19 December 2023)
- National Portrait Gallery, London: 2 prints (as of 19 December 2023)
