= Bergur Þórisson =

Icelandic musician

Bergur Þórisson (Note: This is an Icelandic name. The last name is patronymic, not a family name; this person is referred to by the given name Bergur.) (transliterated as Thorisson; born 1993) is an Icelandic musician, composer, and audio engineer. He is one half of the neo-classical post-rock duo Hugar, musical director for Björk, and frequent collaborator of Ólafur Arnalds.

== Career ==
Bergur grew up in Seltjarnarnes and played the trombone. After graduating from Menntaskólinn við Hamrahlíð in 2012, Bergur was accepted into Juilliard but decided not to pursue it. He took one semester of engineering at Reykjavík University. Bergur joined Ólafur Arnalds in writing the music for the 2013 British TV series Broadchurch, for which Ólafur was awarded the BAFTA awards. Bergur then toured with Ólafur around Europe.

Bergur was the audio engineer on Björk's 2017 Grammy-nominated album, Utopia, and then toured with her on stage on her Cornucopia tour. Other collaborators include Sigur Rós, Jóhann Jóhannsson, and Arnór Dan.

Bergur has a small scale production of microphones he makes by hand.

=== Hugar ===
Bergur started the neo-classical post-rock duo Hugar (meaning "minds") along with his childhood friend Pétur Jónsson in 2012. Their self-titled album was published in 2014 and was given out for free online. They signed with Sony USA and published their second album, Varða, in 2019. The band performed at Iceland Airwaves in 2017, 2018, and 2019. As of 2019 the band has 50 million plays on Spotify.

Bergur and Pétur wrote the score for the 2019 film The Vasulka Effect about artists Steina and Woody Vasulka.
