= Arisen My Senses =

Single by Björk

from the album Utopia
- Released: 21 March 2018
- Length: 5:00
- Label: One Little Indian
- Songwriters: Björk; Arca
- Producers: Björk; Arca

Björk singles chronology
"Blissing Me" (2017)	"Arisen My Senses" (2018)	"Atopos" (2022)

Music video
- "Arisen My Senses" on YouTube

"Arisen My Senses" is the third single from Icelandic singer Björk's ninth studio album, Utopia, released digitally on 21 March 2018. A "slug genitalia-coloured" vinyl remix EP was released months later on 25 May. The song was written and produced with electronic musician Arca, Björk's primary collaborator on Utopia.

== Background and composition ==
"Arisen My Senses" is the opening track of Björk's album Utopia. In an interview with Fact Magazine to promote the album, Björk revealed that "Arisen My Senses" was the starting point of the whole record and literally "the first song we did," the "we" referring to herself and Arca, Utopia's co-writer and producer. She looped a brief sample from a DIS Magazine exclusive mix-tape Arca made in 2011 called Baron Foyel, specifically the track "Little Now A Lot". "I just thought it was the most happiest firework that [she'd] ever done," Björk said, "then I exaggerated that by writing a harp arrangement around it and singing on top of it these ecstatic lyrics." When she surprised Arca with the final result, "...[she] just exploded." After the sad nature of her previous album, Vulnicura, which dealt with the end of her long-term relationship to American artist Matthew Barney, Björk said she tried consciously to do "the opposite now" for Utopia. "The melody’s like a constellation in the sky," she described to Pitchfork. "It’s almost like an optimist rebellion against the normal narrative melody. There’s not one melody. It’s like five melodies. I really loved that."

== Release ==
While the music video for "Arisen My Senses" debuted at the end of 2017, it was not released as a single until 21 March 2018 as a three-track remix EP. It features remixes by Glaswegian IDM musician Lanark Artefax, electronic musician Jlin, and Kelly Lee Owens, an electronic musician and singer from Wales. Stereogum called Björk's choice of remixers for the EP "impeccably picked" and signaled out Owens' mix as "lush" and "thumping" and "the only one that could conceivably get club play somewhere on earth." A "slug genitalia" colored white vinyl followed two months later on 25 May, just two days before Björk took the stage at All Points East in London for the official start of her Utopia tour.

== Critical reception ==
"Arisen My Senses" received critical praise upon Utopia's release in late November 2017. Pitchfork described it as an "arresting banquet" and The Skinny compared it to "cascading waves of beauty, melody, and soul." In comparing the opening salvo to the singer's previous album, The A.V. Club said, "It acts as a sledgehammer to the void of Vulnicura, with layers of harp and vocal melodies multiplying and overlapping in a chaotic expanse. The only completely intelligible lyric is at the last moment—"He sees me for who I am"—and it feels like starved lungs filling with air."

The remix EP was voted "Record of the Week" by the UK-based online publication Hyponik, and praised the original album version's "abundance of celestial sonics" and Björk's "seraphic voice". "The three takes on “Arisen My Senses” utilise these source materials in vastly different ways, each taking their own unique stance on the original. It’s refreshing to hear a remix EP that doesn’t sound like several slightly different versions of the same song, a sin that the format is often guilty of." They regarded Jlin's rework of the track the highlight, stating that it "makes you want to jump out of your chair". Dazed called the remixes "incredible" and noted Björk's use of tracks by Lanark Artefax and Kelly Lee Owens in her recent DJ sets.

== Music video ==
"Arisen My Senses" was the 4th music video released for Utopia. It depicts Björk's rebirth with "the singer emerging from a womb, before entering a fantasy world as a fiery, feathered, winged creature" and has been described as "artfully disturbing". It was made in close collaboration between Björk, director Jesse Kanda, with whom the Icelandic singer had collaborated with on the 2015 VR music video for "Mouth Mantra", and Arca. It was presented by WeTransfer and debuted on their site on 18 December 2017, several months before the release of the single remix EP. It was described as "her hottest (music video) to date" by Paste Magazine but Arca's appearance in the video was criticised by her fanbase.

Both Björk and Arca addressed the controversy, with Arca writing on Instagram, "So many comments from ppl (sic) saying i should stay away from björk, ruined the arisen video by appearing or whatever .. when i’ve clicked thru (sic) to ur (sic) profiles i’ve only found faces that look sweet, soft body language and tender eyed selfies! to you: i send a soft kiss back". Björk later replied to Arca’s message, saying she was "sooo (sic) grateful" that Arca appeared in the video and likened her involvement with that of late British musician and long-time collaborator Mark Bell's appearance in her 2008 music video for “Declare Independence”, which she admits that after Bell's death she's "forever thrilled" she insisted on. Both Arca and Bell co-wrote the respective songs. "I am surprised why some of my fans have a difficulty with this," she continued, and asked fans "be open minded to the complexities of musical union (sic) between generations and different sexual orientations. Making this video with Jesse Kanda was a precious signage for us to recognize collaborations across all those."

== Versions ==
- Album version – 5:00
- Lanark Artefax Remix – 5:12
- Jlin Rework – 3:27
- Kelly Lee Owens Remix – 6:38

== Charts ==
Chart (2018)	Peak position
UK Vinyl Singles (OCC)	5

== Release history ==
Region	Date	Label	Format
Various	21 March 2018	One Little Indian	Digital download
Various	25 May 2018	One Little Indian	12" vinyl
