= Country Creatures =

EP by Björk, Fever Ray and the Knife
- Released: 1 November 2019
- Genre: Industrial
- Length: 11:46
- Label: One Little Indian
- Producer: Björk; Fever Ray; Olof Dreijer; Peder Mannerfelt

Björk chronology
Utopia (2017)	Country Creatures (2019)	Fossora (2022)

Fever Ray chronology
Live at Troxy (2019)	Country Creatures (2019)	Plunge Remix (2019)

The Knife chronology
Stay Out Here / Ready to Lose (Remixes) (2013)	Country Creatures (2019)

Singles from Country Creatures
- 1. "Features Creatures (Fever Ray Remix)" Released: 6 September 2019; 2. "Features Creatures (The Knife Remix)" Released: 6 September 2019; 3. "This Country Makes It Hard to Fuck (Björk Remix)" Released: 6 September 2019

Alternative cover

Country Creatures is a collaborative remix extended play (EP) by Icelandic musician Björk; Swedish musician Karin Dreijer under their alias Fever Ray; and electronic music duo the Knife, consisting of Dreijer and their brother, DJ and record producer Olof Dreijer. The three remixes were initially released digitally as individual singles on 6 September 2019 followed by a limited edition 12" vinyl by One Little Indian Records released on 1 November 2019.

== Background ==
Country Creatures takes its title from the two songs remixed in the collection: "This Country" from Fever Ray's album Plunge, and "Features Creatures" from Björk's Utopia, both released in 2017; one cover art of the EP combines those of both albums. In a social media post announcing the collab, Björk revealed that she chose the Fever Ray track she would remix and vice versa.

On 5 September 2019, Fever Ray shared a photo on their Instagram page featuring them and Björk with a countdown clock. At midnight, three separate remix singles were released, one a remix of Fever Ray's "This Country" done by Björk and two remixes of "Features Creatures", one by Fever Ray and the other by the Knife. Despite the fact that the Knife officially disbanded in 2014, Stereogum notes that the name is sometimes still used on remixes. Björk adds her own vocals to Fever Ray's track, and her remix is titled "This Country Makes It Hard to Fuck".

It was also announced that the three remixes would be collected in a limited edition vinyl called Country Creatures, released by Björk's label One Little Indian on 1 November 2019.

== Critical reception ==
Consequence of Sound noted Björk's reworking of Fever Ray's "This Country", calling it "a disturbing, dissonant industrial collage" and praised their newly added vocals as "haunting". It described Fever Ray's "Features Creatures" remix as "moody atmospherics" and noted the Knife's more dance-oriented take on the track, and in comparing the two felt that they offered "a fascinating look at [Karin Dreijer's] different musical palettes".

== Track listing ==
Country Creatures UK 12" vinyl
No.	Title	Writer(s)	Performer(s)	Length
1.	"This Country Makes It Hard to Fuck" (Björk Remix)	Karin Dreijer	Fever Ray	3:03
2.	"Features Creatures" (Fever Ray Remix)	Björk; Sarah Hopkins	Björk	4:08
3.	"Features Creatures" (The Knife Remix)	Björk; Hopkins	Björk	4:37
Total length:				11:48

== Versions ==
"Features Creatures"

- Album version (CD/digital) – 4:50
- Album version (vinyl) – 4:41
- Fever Ray Remix – 4:07
- The Knife Remix – 4:36

"This Country"

- Album version – 3:12
- Björk Remix – 3:02

== Release history ==
Release history and formats for Country Creatures
Region	Title	Date	Label	Format
Various	"This Country" (Björk Remix)	6 September 2019	Rabid Records	Digital download
Various	"Features Creatures" (Fever Ray Remix)	6 September 2019	One Little Indian	Digital download
Various	"Features Creatures" (The Knife Remix)	6 September 2019	One Little Indian	Digital download
Various	Country Creatures	1 November 2019	One Little Indian	12" vinyl
