= Blissing Me =

Single by Björk

from the album Utopia
- Released: 14 November 2017
- Length: 5:05
- Label: One Little Indian
- Songwriter: Björk
- Producers: Björk; Arca

Björk singles chronology
"The Gate" (2017)	"Blissing Me" (2017)	"Arisen My Senses" (2018)

Music video
- "Blissing Me" on YouTube

Alternate cover
- Remix EP cover

"Blissing Me" is the second single from Icelandic singer Björk's ninth album, Utopia, released on 14 November 2017 via One Little Indian Records. The song was written by Björk and produced by Björk and Arca.

A two-track remix EP followed a month later, on 13 December 2017, and features an acoustic "Harp Only" version of "Blissing Me" and a collaboration with artist Serpentwithfeet.

== Release ==
The single was initially released on 14 November 2017 across digital platforms in its album version, complete with the rushing wind sounds that conclude the previous track on Utopia, "Arisen My Senses" and with the Venezuelan bird song at the end that, in the full album, segues seamlessly into the following track, "The Gate".

On 13 December 2017, a "Blissing Me" remix EP was released digitally, featuring two new mixes, the first of which was a collaboration with Brooklyn singer Serpentwithfeet. Björk had previously praised the singer in a September 2016 article with The Guardian, saying, "He's so talented and so warm and flowing, there's no stifled or stagnant energy in him." The second remix was a "Harp Only" version of "Blissing Me", which has been described as "heavenly". On 7 February 2018, a limited edition 12" aqua vinyl was announced featuring the two previous released "Blissing Me" remixes, with a release date of 23 February.

== Critical reception ==
Pitchfork awarded "Blissing Me" their "Best New Track" label, with a headline declaring "Björk's New Song Will Make You Believe in Love Again". "It's as focused as she's sounded in years," wrote reviewer Alex Frank, who went on to describe "Blissing Me" as "a charmingly modern love song" and praised its "quality and sincerity". NPR praised the track similarly, stating that it "captures the innocence, the uncertainty, and the giddiness of new love" and commented favorably on the song's harp arrangement, comparing it to the tenderest moments of Björk's 2001 album Vespertine.

== Music video ==
The music video debuted 15 November, exclusively on Amazon Music UK, and was directed by Tim Walker and Emma Dalzell. Critics noted the video's simplicity. Fashion magazine Vogue praised this quality, declaring it "one of her most restrained moments in recent memory... despite her "Gucci platforms". In addition to her yellow Gucci shoes, Björk wears a ruffled, blue semi-sheer tulle jumpsuit by British designer Pam Hogg. James Merry, frequent Björk collaborator/mask maker, adorned her braids with flowers and other delicate ornaments. Björk's makeup was the work of Berlin-based drag artist Hungry, who also collaborated in the album's cover art.

== Versions ==
- Album version (5:06)
- Featuring Serpentwithfeet (4:16)
- Harp version (5:05)

== Charts ==
Chart (2018)	Peak position
UK Vinyl Singles (OCC)	2

== Release history ==
Region	Date	Label	Format	Ref.
Worldwide	14 November 2017	One Little Indian	Digital download	
Worldwide	13 December 2017	One Little Indian	Digital download	
Worldwide	23 February 2018	One Little Indian	12-inch vinyl	
