= The Gate (Björk song) =

Single by Björk

from the album Utopia
- Released: 15 September 2017
- Genre: Ambient; electronica
- Length: 3:56 (radio edit); 6:33 (album version)
- Label: One Little Indian
- Songwriters: Björk; Arca
- Producers: Björk; Arca

Björk singles chronology
"Moon" (2011)	"The Gate" (2017)	"Blissing Me" (2017)

Music video
- "The Gate" on YouTube

"The Gate" is a song recorded by Icelandic musician Björk. It was released on 15 September 2017 through One Little Indian as the lead single from her ninth studio album, Utopia (2017). The song was written and produced by Björk and Arca. An ambient and electronica song, "The Gate" lyrically meditates on the possibilities of love, from both a speculative and emphatic point of view. The song was also noted to be a direct transition between the imagery included on Björk's previous studio album, Vulnicura (2015), and Utopia.

The song received positive reviews from music critics, who praised its composition and Björk's vocal delivery. The accompanying music video, directed by Andrew Thomas Huang, premiered at London's The Store Studios on 16 September, before debuting online on 18 September and received equally positive reviews.

== Background and release ==
On 20 January 2015, Björk released Vulnicura, following an online leak. The album dealt with the end of her relationship with American contemporary artist Matthew Barney. She collaborated with Venezuelan producer Arca on the production of the majority of the album. In March 2016, during an interview with Julia Davis for Another Magazine, Björk declared that she reprised her work with Arca, and that they had already done three songs for her new album, stating: "the last album, we sort of call it "hell" – it was like divorce! So we are doing paradise now. Utopia". During an interview for the Fader, Director Andrew Thomas Huang, who directed the videos for the songs "Stonemilker", "Black Lake" and "Family", confirmed plans to direct a new video for the singer, taken from her new album, which he described as "future-facing".

On 3 August 2017, Dazed released their autumn issue featuring Björk, in which she revealed that her upcoming album will include a song titled "The Gate", and that a music video for it had already been shot by Huang. On 5 September 2017, Björk announced that the song will be released as the lead single off the album on September 18 for digital download and on 22 September on a single-sided 12" vinyl along with a pre-order on her official website. She has stated the song is "essentially a love song, but I say 'love' in a more transcendent way. Vulnicura was about a very personal loss, and I think this new album is about a love that's even greater. it's about rediscovering love – but in a spiritual way, for lack of a better word." The single was slated to be premiered during Chris Hawkins' BBC Radio 6 Music show on 15 September 2017, but was ultimately surprise released at midnight on 15 September, three days earlier than the originally announced release date, and some territories got the song before the BBC broadcast, which played its shortened radio edit version. "The Gate" was serviced worldwide to streaming services and online stores in what Björk has declared as a "midnight treat".

== Composition ==
"The Gate" was written and composed in a collaboration between Björk and Arca. The single is an ambient and electronica song, featuring a "sparse" composition, which, according to Slant Magazine journalist Sal Cinquemani, "opens like a hymn, with psalm-style vocals and minimal accompaniment followed by a series of digitized vocables reminiscent of singing whales. What constitutes a hook — a repeated refrain of "I care for you, care for you" — is complemented by softly puttering synths, which become increasingly layered as the track progresses, punctuated by discrete moments of silence". According to Winston Cook-Wilson of Spin, "the track opens with a long passage that sounds distinctly liturgical, reminiscent of centuries-old sacred polyphony. The vocals for the first minute of the song do not form clear lyrics, but their phonemes, at relevant moment, recall words from a Catholic Mass: "fili" and "sanctus."" The journalist moreover observes that "the musical complexity swirling around the vocals germinates gradually, as she rephrases the line "I care for you" over and over again, as if convincing herself of the point in real time. The didgeridoo-like electronic gulps that underscore her vocal lattices [...] morph into high, sensuous glissandos, and the music itself seems to be forming the gate's giant arches."

The song's instrumentation includes "flutes, dissonances" and, as stated by Vulture's Tim McGovern, the singer's "trademark siren-like voice". Critics have compared the song's structure to the singer's previous record, by stating that the song "reprises the stark emotionality of Vulnicura, but, if possible, the singer seems even more vulnerable", with Rolling Stone's Daniel Kreps observing how "sonically and lyrically, "The Gate" feels warmer than anything on Björk's bleak Vulnicura." Flavorwire agreed on this by stating that the track "has a more uplifting sound". The song verses feature synth arrangements and bird sounds, accompanied by woodwinds, which were described as "soothing" and "spare", alternating with "electronic heartbeats" and "pulses", which lead to "a bloom of warped electronics". Throughout the composition, different vocal counterpoints are layered, followed by "impressionistic percussion and synth bursts". Lyrically, it was noted that song speaks of "the possibility of love, at first speculative and then emphatic". According to Cook-Wilson, ""The Gate" seems to dramatize her narrator entering into an earthly paradise of her own conception. “Proud self-sufficiency,” she signs in the song's final verse, nearly unaccompanied. “My silhouette is oval/It is a gate.” Though she is sharing another's company, this seems to be very much her world; she is determining the conditions for its existence, and forming its very substance." The Gate is Björk's third single (after "It's Oh So Quiet" and "The Comet Song") not to receive an official remix.

== Critical reception ==
The song received initial acclaim from music critics. Pitchfork awarded "The Gate" with their "Best New Track" label, with Philip Sherburne writing, "Björk has never shied away from bold metaphors, and here, with her egg-shaped portal into love's domain, she aims bigger than ever. Whatever comes next, this snapshot of love’s gestation feels nothing short of magical." Normand Marine of Les Inrockuptibles praised the song by noting how it was possible to "find the cold, electronic, nearly mechanical side and the complex structures of the track's composition, which are the strength and power of the singer - the warm humanity, the true fragility of her timbre", while finally describing the song as "a track which possesses a disarming beauty, which vibrates and breathes." Vulture has described the song as "straight-up haunting" and "poetic", while DIY defined it as a "six-minute swirling opus that's delicate and emotional, gathering momentum as it goes." Noisey described the song as "totally beautiful". EatThisMusic called it "the finest vocal work from Björk yet".

Mike Wass of Idolator named it an "ambient adventure", which "could be interpreted as modern poetry or complete gibberish depending on your standpoint, but it's undeniably gorgeous and easy on the ears". On a similar note, Highsnobiety critic Jake Boyer observed how the singer "has delivered a seven-minute, spellbinding piece of breathy electronica." Spin found the song "sprawling" and "melancholic", while Daniel Kreps of Rolling Stone called it "mesmerizing". NPR's Robin Hilton praised the song's composition and compared its "warped electronic" to the work of dubstep artist Burial. Jon Pareles of The New York Times found the track "simultaneously bold and intimate".

On a different note, Rich Juzwiak of The Muse expressed a negative review of the song, calling it "utter tuneless" and criticizing the singer's vocal delivery, stating "it increasingly sounds like she’s just singing to herself as she goes about her day, without a care in the world, including whether listeners will actually want to hear her sing-song the same handful of words".

== Music video ==
A music video for the song was confirmed to be in the making during Björk's interview with Dazed, when it was said that the video was directed by longtime collaborator Andrew Thomas Huang and featured dress by Gucci's Alessandro Michele and masks by James Merry. On 6 September 2017, Björk announced that an accompanying film would premiere on 16 and 17 September 2017 at London's The Store Studios, in an event hosted by Nowness. The video was posted to Nowness' YouTube channel on September 17, and on Björk's on September 20.

Björk and Huang discussed the creation of the video during a Facebook Live streaming on 15 September. The video premiered online on Nowness website on 18 September 2017. It was well received by critics, who called it "beautiful" and "incredible". Pitchfork hailed "The Gate" as "the best new Björk music video in a decade," declaring it the best music video of the month and eventually the best music video of the year. "It’s the type of painstaking, ambitious work you’d hope for in an unattainably perfect world," wrote Marc Hogan, "every detail full of love."

Huang elaborated to Nowness for the video's online premiere, "“The Gate” picks up where 2015's Vulnicura left off. It is the first glimpse into Björk's utopia. The doorway lies within the wound from Vulnicura, which now appears transformed into a prismatic portal channeled between the chests of two lovers. Not lovers in the quotidian romantic sense, but in a broader cosmological way... "The Gate" is a declaration of hope sung by a woman refracted and re-formed into a luminous whole". He went on to describe the experience as the "culmination of my five-year collaboration with Björk".

The special effects were done by LA based SFX company Wolf & Crow did the effects for "Black Lake" and "Family" in 2015 (both directed by Huang). Huang complimented their work, saying they "have pulled off an exceptional feat for this visually packed video. Building a world like this takes a village and I feel blessed to be in this company of artists.” Dancer Leo Morimune and choreographer Nina McNeely were motion captured to help create the balletic movements of the fractured digital avatars in the video, and Björk's hair was done by Johnny Stuntz and her make-up by past collaborator Andrew Gallimore. One of the most talked about elements in the video, the singer's custom Gucci dress took 550 hours to make, with an additional 320 hours needed for embroidery.

== Charts ==
Chart performance for "The Gate"
Chart (2017)	Peak position
France Downloads (SNEP)	89
Iceland (RÚV)	11
UK Vinyl Singles (OCC)	3

== Release history ==
Release history and formats for "The Gate"
Region	Date	Label	Format	Ref.
Various	15 September 2017	One Little Indian	Digital download	
Various	22 September 2017	One Little Indian	12" vinyl	

== Versions ==
- Single version – 6:39
- Video version – 6:50
- Vinyl single version – 7:32
- Radio edit – 3:56
- Album version – 6:33
