= History of Silence =

Studio album by Múm
- Released: September 19, 2025
- Studio: Sudestudio (Italy); Hof (Akureyri)
- Genre: Chamber pop
- Length: 33:58
- Label: Morr
- Producer: Múm

Múm chronology
Menschen am Sonntag – Live in Berlin (2018)	History of Silence (2025)

Singles from History of Silence
- 1. "Mild at Heart" Released: 18 June 2025; 2. "Only Songbirds Have a Sweet Tooth" Released: 16 July 2025; 3. "Kill the Light" Released: 5 September 2025

History of Silence is the seventh studio album by Icelandic indietronica band Múm. It was released on 19 September 2025, via Morr Music in LP, CD, cassette and digital formats.

== Background ==
The first full length release since Smilewound in 2013, History of Silence was recorded in several places including Guagnano, Berlin, Prague, Reykjavík, Athens, New York, and Helsinki. "Mild at Heart" was released as the first single of the album on 18 July 2025, alongside a music video directed by Sigurlaug Gísladóttir.

== Reception ==
Professional ratings
Review scores
Source	Rating
Beats Per Minute	45%
MusicOMH	4/5 stars
Pitchfork	5.6/10
PopMatters	9/10

The Fader described the album as "a chamber pop project," noting "the band plays with the idea of distance across the album." Steven Johnson of MusicOMH rated the album four stars, describing it as "a quietly alluring piece of work and stands up as an elegant evolution of their sound." PopMatters' Thomas Britt gave the album a rating of nine and called it the band's best album and "a revelation from start to finish."

== Track listing ==
All tracks are written by Múm.

History of Silence track listing
No.	Title	Length
1.	"Miss You Dance"	5:03
2.	"Kill the Light"	4:39
3.	"Mild at Heart"	4:14
4.	"Avignon"	3:10
5.	"Only Songbirds Have a Sweet Tooth"	4:05
6.	"Our Love Is Distorting"	4:49
7.	"A Dry Heart Needs No Winding"	3:38
8.	"I Like to Shake"	4:20
Total length:		33:58

== Personnel ==
Credits adapted from the album's liner notes.

=== Múm ===
- Gunnar Örn Tynes – production, recording, mixing
- Örvar Þóreyjarson Smárason – production, recording, mixing
- Gyða Valtýsdóttir – production, recording, mixing
- Samuli Kosminen – production, recording, mixing
- Sigurlaug Gísladóttir – production, recording, mixing
- Róberta Andersen – production, recording, mixing
- Jae Tyler – production, recording, mixing

=== Additional contributors ===
- Sinfonia Nord – orchestral strings
- Ingi Garðar Erlendsson – string arrangements, conductor
- Francesco Donadello – mastering
