= Whistle (Kylie Minogue and Múm song) =

2013 promotional single

Promotional single by Kylie Minogue and Múm

from the album Smilewound
- Released: 17 February 2013
- Recorded: 2011
- Genre: Experimental folk; electronic
- Length: 6:06
- Composers: Gunnar Örn Tynes; Örvar Þóreyjarson Smárason
- Producers: Múm; Árni Rúnar Hlöðversson

Audio
- "Whistle" on YouTube

"Whistle" is a song recorded by Australian singer Kylie Minogue and Icelandic band Múm. Band members Gunnar Örn Tynes and Örvar Þóreyjarson Smárason composed the track for the 2012 film Jack & Diane, in which Minogue also had an acting role. The composers developed the song for Minogue, following the director's request to create a song for a club sequence. Minogue heard the track and wished to record it, which led Gunnar to travel to London in late 2011 to record the piece with her.

Initially titled "Whistle in the Rain", the track was later digitally released as "Whistle" on 17 February 2013, before featuring as a bonus track on Múm's studio album, Smilewound (2013). The song is characterized by its experimental folk and electronic sound, incorporating elements of pop, post-classical, and Scandinavian pop. Critics largely praised the song, highlighting the unusual collaboration and its use as the closing track on Smilewound. While Minogue's vocal performance was generally commended, some reviewers noted that her contribution was overshadowed by the unique production.

== Background and development ==
In 2012, Minogue launched K25, a year-long program celebrating her 25 years in the music industry. This campaign featured monthly video releases on her official website and kicked off the Anti Tour in March and April. During this time, she also took on the minor role of Eva Grace in Holy Motors (2012), director Leos Carax's first feature film in 13 years. For the role, Minogue performed "Who Were We?", a forlorn track penned by the Divine Comedy's Neil Hannon, live on set. The film premiered at the 65th Cannes Film Festival, where it competed for the Palme d'Or. In a press interview for Holy Motors, she expressed a deep desire for more acting roles, stating, "My heart cries out for it; it's such a deep longing. For years I've been waiting to get back into [acting] and it just hasn't happened".

While the singer was living in Williamsburg, Brooklyn, her acting manager introduced her to independent director Bradley Rust Gray, who then cast her in his film, Jack & Diane (2012). The romantic horror film tells a story of two teenage lesbians in New York City: Diane (portrayed by Juno Temple) and Jack (Riley Keough). Minogue played a cameo role as Tara, a heavily tattooed lesbian, sharing a kissing scene with Jack. Gray thought Minogue did well in the role, which was uncommon for her as she appeared without makeup and acted on instinct. Icelandic band Múm provided the film score to Jack & Diane. Gray needed a track for a club scene and thought the band could compose something suitable for Minogue to sing. However, a poor phone connection caused Múm to misunderstand the director; they wrote a song for Minogue that was not intended for a club scene. "We sent it to the director, and then it became clear that we had misunderstood him so badly," composer Örvar Þóreyjarson Smárason said.

Despite the initial miscommunication, Minogue heard the song and expressed a desire to record it. Gray reconnected with the band, expressing his continued interest in the collaboration. This led to songwriter Gunnar Örn Tynes flying to London in the fall of 2011 to record the track with Minogue. According to Örvar, Minogue was pleased with the result. The recording of "Whistle" coincided with Múm's work on their sixth studio album, Smilewound, their first original project since Sing Along to Songs You Don't Know (2009).

== Release ==
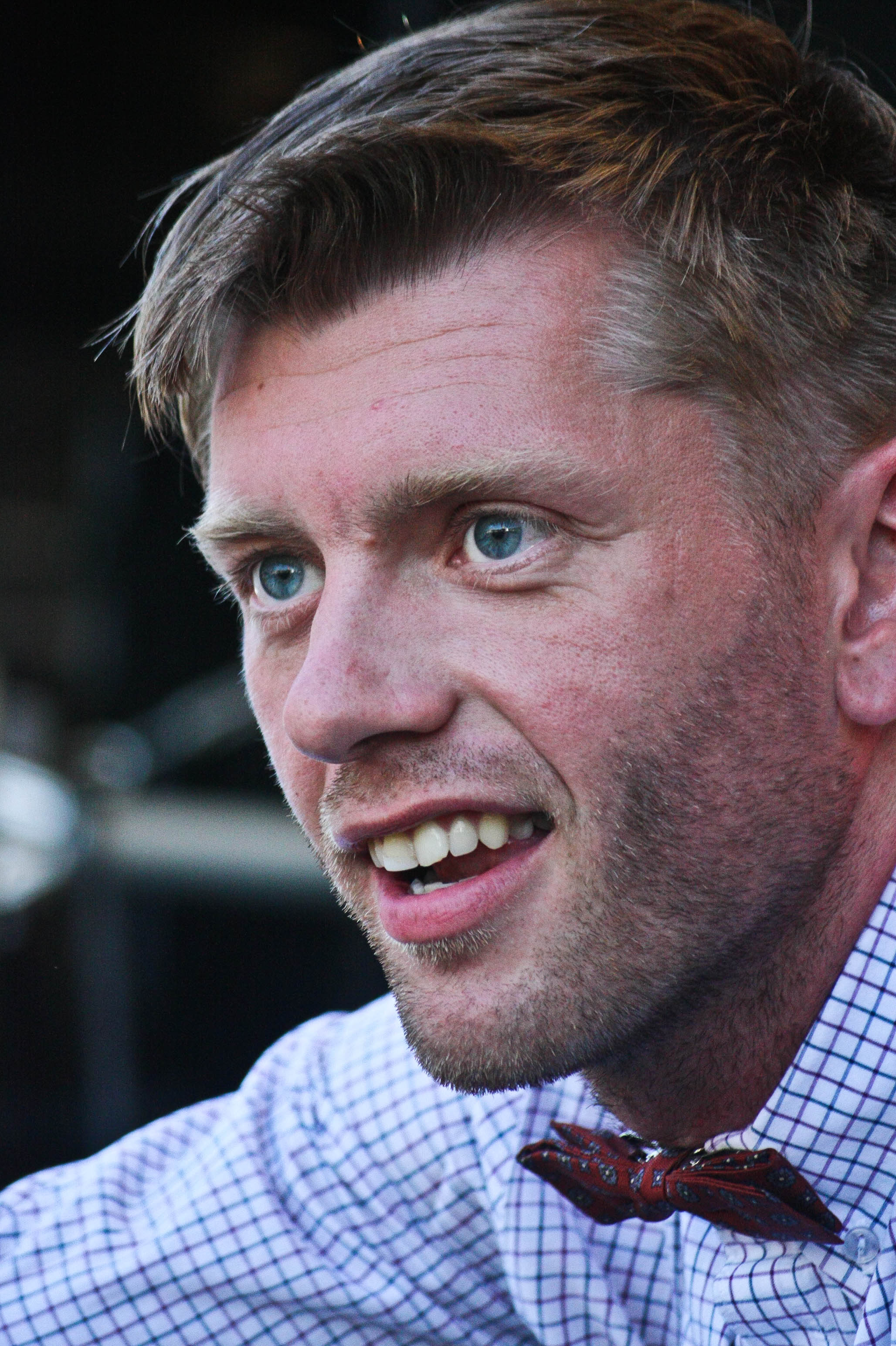
Icelandic musician Örvar Þóreyjarson Smárason (pictured in 2011) composed the track with Gunnar Örn Tynes.

Jack & Diane premiered at the Tribeca Festival in April 2012, where the song was credited as "Whistle in the Rain". On 17 February 2013, Minogue digitally released the track as a promotional single, simply titled "Whistle", almost a year after the premiere of Jack and Diane. On their website, Múm claimed that "Whistle" would be included on their next record. That June, the band announced Smilewound, which featured "Whistle" as a bonus track. The album was released by Morr Music on 6 September 2013, in which Minogue was credited simply as "Kylie". She was the only featured vocalist on the album. Icelandic newspaper Vísir.is noted that the release of "Whistle" continued Minogue's collaborations with Icelandic musicians, mentioning her previous work with Pétur Hallgrímsson and Emilíana Torrini.

== Composition ==
"Whistle" was composed by Gunnar and Örvar, with Árni Rúnar Hlöðversson of FM Belfast co-producing. Samuli Kosminen contributed on percussion, and Júlía Mogensen played the cello. Musically, it is set in the key of G# major with a tempo of 180 beats per minute. The composers characterized "Whistle" as an unusual pop song, noting it was not typical for Minogue's style, but emphasized that it was written with the context of Jack & Diane specifically in mind. In their reviews of Smilewound, several music journalists highlighted "Whistle", and the inclusion of Minogue, as one of the clearest examples of the band embracing pop elements, including Jon Pareles of The New York Times, Q Magazine, Sal Cinquemani of Slant Magazine, Chris Buckle of The Skinny, and Christian Cottingham of The Line of Best Fit. Chris White of MusicOMH felt the track showcased a more upbeat production compared to the band's typical electronica sound.

Critics categorize the overall sound as experimental folk, and electronic, with influences of post-classical, and Scandinavian pop music. The track features glistening drums, clicking glitches, shimmering synths, and orchestral elements. Its production drew comparison to the work of Icelandic musician Björk from Marc Andrews, author of Kylie: Song by Song (2023), and Cinquemani. These two writers, along with Canoe.com noted the track's ethereal and enigmatic atmosphere, though Cottingham found it "jittery and hyperactive". Cinquemani described the production sounds as "digital droplets of freezing rain gently colliding with wind chimes". Minogue delivered a breathy, whispery, and warm vocal performance. Chuck Campbell, writing for Knoxville News Sentinel, described her vocal sound as though she was "trapped in an echo chamber". Critics also noted the track's esoteric lyrics, notably including the opening line: "I bleed like a pig / It's not so unusual." Cinquemani believed the lyrics mirrored the film's narrative, examining the connections and bonding among the female characters.

== Reception ==
Smilewound and its tracks received minimal coverage in Iceland upon their release. Both The Reykjavík Grapevine and The New York Times later selected it as one of the most overlooked albums of 2013. Reviewers remarked on the experimental nature of "Whistle" within Minogue's repertoire. Brian Keane of The Irish Times found the collaboration "unlikely but lovely". Pitchfork's Brian Howe praised Minogue's strong vocal performance as a positive influence on the track, which grounded the intricate instrumental arrangement. Her presence was commended by Árni Matthíasson of Morgunblaðið, who picked it as one of the standouts of Smilewound, while Pareles felt she was "pulled into Múm's own realm of quiet, crystalline tension." Describing the track as "elegantly emotive", Buckle commented that it played to the individual strengths of both Minogue and Múm. Sharing the same sentiment, Alistair Powell of Classic Pop ranked "Whistle" as Minogue's sixth-best collaboration, calling it an "electronic alt-opus" and a "jewel in [her] collaboration portfolio".

Journalists largely deemed "Whistle" as a fitting closer track for Smilewound, including KULTer.hu's Szekeres Zoltán, Beats Per Minute's Ray Finlayson, The 405's Gareth O'Malley, and Deutschlandfunk's Von Luigi Lauer. AllMusic's Heather Phares agreed, noting the track concludes the album "with a pretty, if not thrilling, slice of [Múm's] signature sound", while Austin Trunick of Under the Radar called it a "sweetly-whispered dénouement". Other reviewers, however, felt Minogue was overshadowed by the unique production, including The Arts Desk's Kieron Tyler, who commented that "her presence wouldn't be noticed if she weren't credited". Matthíasson, despite finding the track delightful and well-performed, believed Smilewound as a whole was better without it. Edward Hancox of Iceland Review dismissed the collaboration as unnecessary, suggesting it might have been more about boosting Minogue's credibility. Tristan Parker of Time Out considered it one of the album's weaker tracks.

== Credits ==
Credits are adapted from Smilewound liner notes and Apple Music:

- Múm – vocals, mixing engineer, producer
- Kylie Minogue – vocals
- Gunnar Örn Tynes – composer
- Örvar Smárason – composer
- Samuli Kosminen – percussion
- Eiríkur Orri Ólafsson – strings, strings arranger
- Júlía Mogensen – cello
- Árni Rúnar Hlöðversson – co-producer
