= Green Grass of Tunnel =

Single by Múm

from the album Finally We Are No One
- Released: 29 April 2002
- Length: 4:58
- Label: FatCat
- Songwriter(s): Gunnar Örn Tynes; Örvar Þóreyjarson Smárason; Gyða Valtýsdóttir; Kristín Anna Valtýsdóttir

Múm singles chronology
"The Ballad of the Broken Birdie Records" (1999)	"Green Grass of Tunnel" (2002)	"Nightly Cares" (2004)

Professional ratings
Review scores
Source	Rating
Pitchfork	7.7/10

"Green Grass of Tunnel" is a song by Icelandic band Múm. It was released as a single from their 2002 album Finally We Are No One, on FatCat Records on 29 April 2002. It peaked at number 90 on the UK Singles Chart. Pitchfork listed it 484th on its countdown of the Top 500 tracks of the 2000s.

== Music video ==
The music video was created in computer graphics by Semiconductor's Joe Gerhardt and Ruth Jarman. It follows the view of a flock of birds, and presents a lighthouse, presumably very similar to the house in which they stayed. Brad Osborn has noted how the craggy, icy peaks depicted in the video are linked to the pentatonic leaps in the lead vocal melody, and also to the cold, metallic timbres used in the recording.

== Track listing ==
No.	Title	Length
1.	"Green Grass of Tunnel" (album version)	4:58
2.	"In Through the Lamp"	5:55
Total length:		10:53

The promo CD includes "Green Grass of Tunnel" (video version).

== Charts ==
Chart (2002)	Peak position
UK Singles (OCC)	90

== Cover version ==
The song was covered by British Sea Power on their 2005 single "It Ended on an Oily Stage".
