= Slowblow (album) =

Studio album by Slowblow
- Released: 2004
- Genre: Electronica, lo-fi
- Length: 38:54
- Label: Mobilé
- Producer: Slowblow

Slowblow chronology
Nói Albínói (2004)	Slowblow (2004)

Slowblow is the final album by Icelandic band Slowblow, released in 2004. Then lead singer, Kristín Anna Valtýsdóttir, in another Icelandic band Múm, and Amiina band member, Maria Huld Markan Sigfúsdóttir, made notable appearances on several tracks of the album.

== Track listing ==
1. "Very Slow Bossanova" — 3:55
2. "I Know You Can Smile" — 3:23
3. "Within Tolerance" — 4:03
4. "Second Hand Smoke" — 3:39
5. "Happiness in Your Face" — 3:20
6. "Aim for a Smile" — 4:16
7. "Cardboard Box" — 3:06
8. "Dark Horse" — 3:33
9. "Hamburger Cemetary" [sic] — 4:23
10. "Phantom of My Organ" — 5:09

== Personnel ==
- Kristín Anna Valtýsdóttir — vocals, accordion on track 2, 3, 7, 10.
- Maria Huld Markan Sigfúsdóttir — violin on track 3, 4, 10.
- Gyða Valtýsdóttir — cello on track 4.
- Valdi Kolli — double bass on track 1.
- Óli Björn — drums on track 4.
- Pétur — banjo on track 6.
- Kristján Freyr — drums on track 6.
- Guðrún Hrund — viola on track 9.
- Una — violin on track 9.
- Hrafnhildur — violin on track 9.
- Hrafnkell Orri — cello on track 9.
