= Go Go Smear the Poison Ivy =

Studio album by múm
- Released: 24 September 2007
- Genre: Electronica
- Length: 44:13
- Label: FatCat

Múm chronology
Summer Make Good (2004)	Go Go Smear the Poison Ivy (2007)	Sing Along to Songs You Don't Know (2009)

Singles from Go Go Smear the Poison Ivy
- 1. "They Made Frogs Smoke 'Til They Exploded" Released: 27 August 2007; 2. "Marmalade Fires" Released: 17 December 2007

Go Go Smear the Poison Ivy is the fourth studio album by múm. It was released via FatCat Records on 24 September 2007. It peaked at number 8 on Billboard's Top Dance/Electronic Albums chart.

The album marks a shift from the group's original style as it uses more live instruments than electronics, and there is a different vocal style, including male vocals. Almost two years prior to the release of this album, the band's former lead singer, Kristín Anna Valtýsdóttir, left the band. Critics attributed the change in style to this development.

== Critical reception ==
Professional ratings
Aggregate scores
Source	Rating
Metacritic	66/100
Review scores
Source	Rating
AllMusic	4/5 stars
NME	favorable
Pitchfork	5.7/10
PopMatters	favorable
Slant Magazine	3/5 stars
Stylus Magazine	C
Tiny Mix Tapes	2.5/5 stars

Go Go Smear the Poison Ivy was met with "generally favorable" reviews from critics. At Metacritic, which assigns a weighted average rating out of 100 to reviews from mainstream publications, this release received an average score of 66, based on 20 reviews.

== Track listing ==
No.	Title	Length
1.	"Blessed Brambles"	6:00
2.	"A Little Bit, Sometimes"	3:50
3.	"They Made Frogs Smoke 'Til They Exploded"	4:02
4.	"These Eyes Are Berries"	3:00
5.	"Moon Pulls"	2:32
6.	"Marmalade Fires"	5:03
7.	"Rhubarbidoo" (titled "Rhuubarbidoo" on some releases)	1:34
8.	"Dancing Behind My Eyelids"	4:07
9.	"Schoolsong Misfortune"	2:39
10.	"I Was Her Horse"	2:08
11.	"Guilty Rocks"	5:02
12.	"Winter (What We Never Were After All)"	4:08

Japanese edition bonus track
No.	Title	Length
13.	"The Amateur Show"	5:02

== Personnel ==
Additional musicians

- Samuli Kosminen – drums (on 1, 3, 4, 7, and 12)
- Eiríkur Orri Ólafsson – trumpet (on 8 and 10)
- Guðbjörg Hlin Guðmundsdóttir – violin
- Þórarinn MárBaldursson – viola
- Laufey Jensdóttir – violin
- Gyða Valtýsdóttir – cello
- Páll Ivan Pálsson – double bass
- Gunnhildur Einarsdóttir – harp

== Charts ==
Chart	Peak position
US Top Dance/Electronic Albums (Billboard)	8
