= Mr. Silla & Mongoose =

Icelandic band

- Origin: Iceland
- Genres: Electronic, Experimental, Blues
- Years active: 2005–present
- Labels: Raf Raf
- Members: Sigurlaug Gísladóttir; Magnús B. Skarphéðinsson
- Website: Official page

Mr. Silla & Mongoose is an Icelandic band consisting of fellow students Sigurlaug Gísladóttir and Magnús B. Skarphéðinsson. The two met while studying visual arts at Iceland Academy of the Arts but did not form a band until after they had collaborated on their respective solo sets during Iceland Airwaves 2005 at a café by the name of Kaffi Hljómalind (also referenced in fellow Icelandic band Sigur Rós song named Hljómalind).

The music performed by Mr. Silla & Mongoose can be appropriately placed in the electronic and experimental genres but in some songs also veers off vocally in the direction of blues. The instrumentation includes music sequencers, mandolin, drums and brass.

Sigurlaug Gísladóttir is also one of the new members of the band Múm where she is doing vocals, replacing former lead singer Kristín Anna Valtýsdóttir while Magnús B. Skarphéðinsson currently works under the moniker Magnoose as an experimental musician and visual artist.

== Discography ==
=== Albums ===
- Foxbite (Raf Raf, 2007)
