= Dusk Log =

EP by múm
- Released: 13 September 2004
- Genre: Electronica
- Length: 18:06
- Label: Fat Cat

Múm chronology
The Ballad of the Broken Birdie Records (2000)	Dusk Log (2004)	The Peel Session (2006)

Dusk Log is an EP from the album Summer Make Good that was released by múm in 2004.

== Track listing ==
1. "Kostrzyn" — 5:17
2. "This Nothing Blowing in the Faraway" — 4:07
3. "Will the Summer Make Good for All of Our Sins?" — 4:06
4. "Boots of Fog" — 4:34

Label: Fat Cat (cd10fat03 / 10fat03) Format: 3"CD
