= Jasmine (Finnish singer) =

Finnish Romani singer (born 1976)

Jasmine Tatjana Anette Valentin (born in Helsinki, 22 August 1976), known mononymously as Jasmine, is a Finnish Romani singer.

She represented Finland in the Eurovision Song Contest 1996 with the song Niin kaunis on taivas, placed 23rd. After Eurovision, she had appearances in various countries, including Turkey, Spain and Greece.

Preceded by CatCat with Bye Bye Baby	Finland in the Eurovision Song Contest; 1996	Succeeded by Edea with Aava
