= Finally We Are No One =

Studio album by Múm
- Released: 20 May 2002
- Genres: Electropop; post-rock; electronica
- Length: 56:08
- Label: FatCat

Múm chronology
Yesterday Was Dramatic – Today Is OK (1999)	Finally We Are No One (2002)	Summer Make Good (2004)

Alternative cover
- Cover for the Icelandic limited edition of the album, titled Loksins erum við engin

Singles from Finally We Are No One
- 1. "Green Grass of Tunnel" Released: 22 April 2002

Finally We Are No One is the second studio album by Icelandic band Múm. It was released on 20 May 2002 by FatCat Records.

In Iceland, the Smekkleysa label released Loksins erum við engin, a limited edition of Finally We Are No One featuring alternate versions of the album's songs recorded in the Icelandic language.

== Production ==
Múm worked on Finally We Are No One in Galtarviti, a lighthouse in the Westfjords. Inside the lighthouse, the band composed songs for the album, which they subsequently recorded in a studio. Explaining why they decided to work in Galtarviti, Múm member Gunnar Örn Tynes said:

We went there and we really liked the place... We were connected to it. You get a different sense of time being there... It's far away from everything. There's no electricity except for a power generator, and there's no phone connection, there's no TV, there's no radio, and you have to work for everything you want to get.

== Critical reception ==
Professional ratings
Review scores
Source	Rating
AllMusic	4/5 stars
Alternative Press	9/10
NME	7/10
Pitchfork	7.5/10
Q	4/5 stars
Rolling Stone	3.5/5 stars

Hot Press critic James Kelleher described Finally We Are No One as "a luscious 56-minute lullaby for troubled heads, sung quietly and played with delicate precision." Q found the album "utterly unique" and highlighted Múm's "curious combination of bright-eyed playfulness and maudlin moods", while in Rolling Stone, Jon Caramanica commented that the band "find majestic sounds in unlikely places." Cam Lindsay of Exclaim! wrote, "Glitches, moody organs and slow, heavy beats are thrown all over the place, mixed in with some of the most magical sounds, which seem as though they are covered in pixie dust." Pitchfork's Mark Richardson said that a few songs "grate with their simple-minded sweetness", but "a handful of others are excellent."

In 2016, Paste ranked Finally We Are No One at number 11 on its list of the 50 best post-rock albums.

== Track listing ==
All tracks are written by Örvar Þóreyjarson Smárason, Gunnar Örn Tynes, Gyða Valtýsdóttir and Kristín Anna Valtýsdóttir.

Finally We Are No One track listing
No.	Title	Length
1.	"Sleep/Swim"	0:50
2.	"Green Grass of Tunnel"	4:51
3.	"We Have a Map of the Piano"	5:19
4.	"Don't Be Afraid, You Have Just Got Your Eyes Closed"	5:43
5.	"Behind Two Hills,,,,a Swimmingpool"	1:08
6.	"K/Half Noise"	8:41
7.	"Now There's That Fear Again"	3:56
8.	"Faraway Swimmingpool"	2:55
9.	"I Can't Feel My Hand Any More, It's Alright, Sleep Still"	5:40
10.	"Finally We Are No One"	5:07
11.	"The Land Between Solar Systems"	11:58
Total length:		56:08

Loksins erum við engin track listing
No.	Title	Length
1.	"Svefn/sund"	0:50
2.	"Grasi vaxin göng"	4:51
3.	"Við erum með landakort af píanóinu"	5:19
4.	"Ekki vera hrædd, þú ert bara með augun lokuð"	5:43
5.	"Á bakvið tvær hæðir,,,,sundlaug"	1:08
6.	"K/hálft óhljóð"	8:41
7.	"Nú snýr óttinn aftur"	3:56
8.	"Sundlaug í buskanum"	2:55
9.	"Ég finn ekki fyrir hendinni á mér, en það er allt í lagi, liggðu bara kyrr"	5:40
10.	"Loksins erum við engin"	5:07
11.	"Sveitin milli sólkerfa"	11:58
Total length:		56:08

== Personnel ==
Credits are adapted from the album's liner notes.

Additional musicians

- Helga Þóra Björgvinsdóttir – violin and viola on "I Can't Feel My Hand Any More, It's Alright, Sleep Still"
- Anna Hugadóttir – violin and viola on "I Can't Feel My Hand Any More, It's Alright, Sleep Still"
- Orri Jónsson – organ
- Ingrid Karlsdóttir – violin and viola on "I Can't Feel My Hand Any More, It's Alright, Sleep Still"
- Samuli Kosminen – drums, percussion
- Eiríkur Orri Ólafsson – trumpet

Production

- Orri Jónsson – recording
- Valgeir Sigurðsson – mixing, recording

== Charts ==
Chart performance for Finally We Are No One
Chart (2002)	Peak position
Belgian Alternative Albums (Ultratop Flanders)	50
French Albums (SNEP)	140
Norwegian Albums (VG-lista)	14
Scottish Albums (Official Charts)	81
UK Albums (Official Charts)	120
UK Independent Albums (Official Charts)	16
