= Yesterday Was Dramatic – Today Is OK =

Studio album by Múm
- Released: 23 December 1999
- Genre: Electropop; post-rock; ambient; electronica
- Length: 67:36
- Label: TMT

Múm chronology
Yesterday Was Dramatic – Today Is OK (1999)	Finally We Are No One (2002)

Singles from Yesterday Was Dramatic – Today Is OK
- 1. "The Ballad of the Broken Birdie Records" Released: 1999

Yesterday Was Dramatic – Today Is OK is the debut studio album by Icelandic band Múm. It was released on 23 December 1999 by TMT Entertainment.

== Critical reception and legacy ==
Professional ratings
Review scores
Source	Rating
AllMusic	4.5/5 stars
The Guardian	5/5 stars
Mojo	4/5 stars
Muzik	4/5
NME	8/10
Pitchfork	9.1/10
Tiny Mix Tapes	4.5/5

Reviewing Yesterday Was Dramatic – Today Is OK for AllMusic, Tim DiGravina found the music "effortlessly timeless and thoroughly engrossing" and called the album "an unmitigated, accessible masterpiece." Matt LeMay of Pitchfork deemed it "one of the most deeply, purely emotionally affecting albums of the year."

In 2005, Múm performed Yesterday Was Dramatic – Today Is OK live in its entirety as part of the All Tomorrow's Parties-curated Don't Look Back concert series. On 30 August 2019, Morr Music released a 20th anniversary remastered edition of the album, which included remixes and reinterpretations of the album's songs as bonus tracks.

== Track listing ==
All tracks are written by Örvar Þóreyjarson Smárason, Gunnar Örn Tynes, Gyða Valtýsdóttir and Kristín Anna Valtýsdóttir.

No.	Title	Length
1.	"I'm 9 Today"	4:42
2.	"Smell Memory"	9:23
3.	"There Is a Number of Small Things"	6:32
4.	"Random Summer"	3:12
5.	"Asleep on a Train"	7:17
6.	"Awake on a Train"	9:23
7.	"The Ballad of the Broken Birdie Records"	5:25
8.	"The Ballad of the Broken String"	4:45
9.	"Sunday Night Just Keeps on Rolling"	8:10
10.	"Slow Bicycle"	8:47
Total length:		67:36

20th anniversary edition bonus tracks
No.	Title	Length
11.	"The Ballad of the Broken Birdie Records" (Ruxpin remix II)	5:13
12.	"Smell Memory" (Bix remix)	5:14
13.	"There Is a Number of Small Things & The Ballad of the Broken Birdie Records" (µ-Ziq Straight mix)	8:01
14.	"The Ballad of the Broken Birdie Records" (Biogen mix)	5:24
15.	"Smell Memory" (Kronos Quartet rework)	9:34
16.	"Random Summer" (Hauschka rework)	3:53
17.	"The Ballad of the Broken String" (Sóley rework)	4:08
Total length:		109:03

== Personnel ==
Credits are adapted from the album's liner notes.

Additional musicians

- Helga Björg Arnardóttir – clarinet on "There Is a Number of Small Things" and "Awake on a Train"
- Sigríður Geirsdóttir – strings on "Awake on a Train"
- Hildur Guðnadóttir – strings on "Awake on a Train"
- Stefán Már Magnússon – guitar on "Awake on a Train"
- Eiríkur Orri Ólafsson – trumpet on "Awake on a Train"
- Gróa Margrét Valdimarsdóttir – strings on "Awake on a Train"

Production

- Finnur Björnsson – mixing, recording
- Finnur Hákonarson – recording
- Múm – mixing, recording

Design

- Arnaldur Hilmisson – artwork
- Múm – artwork

== Release history ==
Region	Date	Format(s)	Label(s)	Ref.
Iceland	23 December 1999	CD; LP	TMT	
United Kingdom	19 June 2000	CD	Tugboat	
Japan	25 September 2001	CD	P-Vine	
Various	4 October 2005	CD; LP	Morr	
Japan	21 September 2007	CD	P-Vine	
Japan	17 October 2012	CD	Hostess	
Various	30 August 2019	CD; LP; cassette; digital download; streaming	Morr	
