= Knock at the Cabin (soundtrack) =

Knock at the Cabin (Original Motion Picture Soundtrack)

Film score by Herdís Stefánsdóttir
- Released: February 3, 2023
- Recorded: 2022–2023
- Studio: AIR Studios, London
- Genre: Film score
- Length: 54:16
- Label: Back Lot Music
- Producer: Úlfur Hansson

Herdís Stefánsdóttir chronology
The Essex Serpent (2022)	Knock at the Cabin (2023)	Trap (2024)

Knock at the Cabin (Original Motion Picture Soundtrack) is the film score to the 2023 apocalyptic psychological horror film Knock at the Cabin directed by M. Night Shyamalan, starring Dave Bautista, Jonathan Groff, Ben Aldridge, Nikki Amuka-Bird, Kristen Cui, Abby Quinn and Rupert Grint. The film score is composed by Herdís Stefánsdóttir and released through Back Lot Music on February 3, 2023.

== Background ==
Herdís Stefánsdóttir composed the film score in his first collaboration with Shyamalan. While reading the script for Knock at the Cabin, she interpreted it as a familiar, old story that is prevalent in horror films. He discussed with Shyamalan regarding the script and read few stuff online. Her first instinct was to go back to the golden era of horror cinema in the 1960s, but in a contemporary fashion. The "cabin in the woods" setup led her to be reminiscent of Bernard Herrmann's score for Alfred Hitchcock's features, and though she could not write the music in such a style, she allowed herself to be inspired by the tonal and chord language of Hermann's work, and wanted to replicate that in a contemporary setting. She wrote a 25-minute piece of music which she sent to Shyamalan and felt it was the right tone for the film, thus providing an idea of how the tonal language of the film should be.

Stefánsdóttir's electronic music background also insisted her on providing importance to sonic language. Since the story line is set in the only room of the cabin, it felt like a theater play and had to enhance creativity to sustain tension and multilayered storytelling within a narrow visual frame. She was inspired by the woods, and its knocking sounds, and the sounds of the environment in one layer, while the second layer had to portray the initial emotions, which begins with pure terror. The use of biblical-looking metal weapons where also used for the sounds he would create, while also the close up shots of the faces also provide numerous emotions. Though the Hermann influence was present—right from the opening titles, as a nod to the 1960s—Shyamalan provided creative freedom to Stefánsdóttir to set the atmospheric tone, though it would have refrained to not give nod to that Hitchcock era and compose a different kind of score. She felt that the artistic direction, she took helped her to do a really obvious nod to that era, which led these things inspire each other and ultimately let the score to feel in some sense which was fresh, but also have those Hitchcock influences. Stefánsdóttir was also amazed by the cinematography and Shyamalan's shooting style, where he used 1990s cameras for filming in a single room with the cast members.

== Development and production ==
Leonard's theme was the first piece which Stefánsdóttir planned to wrote before watching the film, which was a "beautiful but melancholic" theme as the character stands for guidance. But that thing was not featured in the film. After she wrote character themes before watching the film, she understood that she had to take another direction in the film, as a big part of the plot is not to reveal Leonard's true identity and though he could not have a particular character theme, the music is taking the perspective of the family. The score was written in Iceland during the fall and in the night times, with the help of candle lights as an unconventional way of inspiration for writing the score. Stefánsdóttir used some unconventional instruments, like glasses of water which he squeezed in a scene that set in the organic world.

Stefánsdóttir revealed that the score had hidden electronics but not really much in the subsonic base field, as she planned for an orchestral, lush and terrifying score. She played the contrabass clarinet for the first time in her career, calling it a "crazy" instrument as it goes many octaves lower than the actual playing; she noted that in the "Four Horseman" cue, she played the clarinet as a bass drone providing weird noises and harmonics to evoke terror, and the instrument was a fundamental source. The instrument was played by John McCowen using unique techniques. She further wanted to keep the electronic music more hidden as a sonic addition for the nightmare the characters would experience. For this film, Stefánsdóttir read the Book of Revelation to bring the biblical influences in the music.

Stefánsdóttir wrote the score pretty fast, though the process was very long in the beginning. While the original duration was around two-and-a-half hours, the team edited the film's duration to around 90 minutes. As a result, for Stefánsdóttir, she lost a bit of thematic material, melodies and themes based around the story in the edit, but felt that is how filmmaking goes.

== Track listing ==
No.	Title	Length
1.	"Prologue"	2:15
2.	"Knock at the Cabin"	3:37
3.	"Breaking In"	3:06
4.	"Four Horsemen"	2:27
5.	"First the Cities Will Drown"	4:29
6.	"Redmond Dies"	1:15
7.	"Truly Sorry"	2:03
8.	"First Harbinger"	3:34
9.	"But You Will"	2:08
10.	"Wen Tries to Escape"	2:00
11.	"Adrienne's Sacrifice"	2:12
12.	"Second Harbinger"	2:35
13.	"Grab the Gun"	3:41
14.	"Get in the Bathroom"	2:29
15.	"Excuse Me"	3:27
16.	"Leonard's Last Part"	2:49
17.	"Revelations"	3:32
18.	"Sacrifice and Departure"	2:36
19.	"Diner"	2:07
20.	"Epilogue"	1:54
Total length:		54:16

== Reception ==
Filmtracks wrote "Stefánsdóttir's work is sufficient and at times interesting, but its depressingly sparse and angry personality make the album presentation a challenging chore." David Rooney of The Hollywood Reporter called it a "high-dudgeon score". A. O. Scott of The New York Times wrote "The music (by Herdis Stefansdottir) hums with menace." Anthony Lane of The New Yorker wrote "The score, by Herdís Stefánsdóttir, is a kind of musical thundercloud". Don Kaye of Den of Geek called it a "foreboding score". Brian Lowry of CNN called it a "pounding score" fuelling the tension, while Justin Chang of Los Angeles Times called it "menacing". James Verniere of Boston Herald called the score "dread-inducing". Courtney Lanning of News Center Maine wrote "Composer Herdís Stefánsdóttir's score complemented the terror of this violent story where the stakes could not be higher."

== Release history ==
Region	Date	Format(s)	Label(s)	Ref.
Various	February 3, 2023	Digital download; streaming	Back Lot Music	
Various	June 23, 2023	LP	Waxwork Records	

== Accolades ==
Award	Date of ceremony	Category	Recipient(s)	Result	Ref.
Hollywood Music in Media Awards	November 15, 2023	Best Original Score – Horror Film	Herdís Stefánsdóttir	Nominated	
World Soundtrack Awards	October 21, 2023	Discovery of the Year	Herdís Stefánsdóttir	Nominated	

== Personnel ==
Credits adapted from liner notes:

- Music composer – Herdís Stefánsdóttir
- Music producer – Úlfur Hansson
- Conductor – Robert Ames
- Orchestrator – Robert Ames, Leo Grant, Matthew Hill
- Orchestra manager – Amy-Elizabeth Hinds
- Engineer – Nick Wollage, Olga Fitzroy
- Assistant engineer – Ben Creasey, Jedidiah Rimell, Max Blue Churchill
- Recording – Ashley Andrew-Jones
- Mixing – Styrmir Hauksson
- Mastering – Bo Kondren
- Supervising music editor – Lesley Langs
- Music editor – Dylan Neely
- Music supervisor – Susan Jacobs
- Copyist – Ananda Chatterjee
- Music business and legal affairs for Universal Pictures – David Flanzer, Tanya Perara
- Executive in charge of music for Universal Pictures – Mike Knobloch
- Marketing and production manager for Back Lot Music – Nikki Walsh, Qin Yu, Zach Grossman
