= Sing Along to Songs You Don't Know =

Studio album by múm
- Released: 17 August 2009
- Genre: Electronic
- Length: 49:07
- Label: Morr Music; Euphono

Múm chronology
Go Go Smear the Poison Ivy (2007)	Sing Along to Songs You Don't Know (2009)	Smilewound (2013)

Professional ratings
Aggregate scores
Source	Rating
Metacritic	62/100
Review scores
Source	Rating
Allmusic	3.5/5 stars
BBC Music	(average)
The Guardian	3/5 stars
The Observer	(favourable)
Pitchfork Media	(3.9/10)
The Times	4/5 stars

Sing Along to Songs You Don't Know is the fifth full-length studio album by Icelandic group múm, released in August 2009.

The album was first made available to purchase for download on 17 August 2009, through the web site Gogoyoko, with 10 percent of the proceeds being donated to the non-governmental organisation Refugees United. The full European release followed on 24 August, and the North American on 22 September.

As indicated by the title, some of the album's songs partly and informally rework melodies and lyrics from known pop songs. Thus, "If I Were a Fish" includes references to the Tim Hardin song "If I Were a Carpenter" and "Sing Along" includes a melody from "The World Laughs On", a song by Danish musician Otto Brandenburg, popularized in an Icelandic version in 1960 entitled "Ég er kominn heim", performed by Óðinn Valdimarsson.

== Track listing ==
1. "If I Were a Fish" – 4:16
2. "Sing Along" – 5:39
3. "Prophecies and Reversed Memories" – 4:06
4. "A River Don't Stop to Breathe" – 4:45
5. "The Smell of Today Is Sweet Like Breastmilk in the Wind" – 4:47
6. "Show Me" – 3:45
7. "Húllabbalabbalúú" – 3:27
8. "Blow Your Nose" – 4:07
9. "Kay-Ray-Kú-Kú-Kó-Kex" – 3:57
10. "The Last Shapes of Never" – 2:27
11. "Illuminated" – 4:09
12. "Ladies of the New Century" – 3:45
