= Summer Make Good =

Studio album by Múm
- Released: 12 April 2004
- Studio: Galtarviti (Westfjords); Garðskagaviti (Southern Peninsula)
- Genre: Electronica; post-rock
- Length: 46:50
- Label: FatCat

Múm chronology
Finally We Are No One (2002)	Summer Make Good (2004)	Go Go Smear the Poison Ivy (2007)

Singles from Summer Make Good
- 1. "Nightly Cares" Released: 15 March 2004

Professional ratings
Aggregate scores
Source	Rating
Metacritic	71/100
Review scores
Source	Rating
AllMusic	3/5 stars
Alternative Press	4/5
Drowned in Sound	8/10
Entertainment Weekly	C
Mojo	4/5 stars
Pitchfork	4.5/10
Q	3/5 stars
Slant Magazine	2/5 stars
Stylus Magazine	7/10
Tiny Mix Tapes	4/5

Summer Make Good is the third studio album by Icelandic band Múm. It was released on 12 April 2004 by FatCat Records.

The CD edition of Summer Make Good was released in a cardboard sleeve. 28 June 2004 saw the release of a "limited presentation" edition of the album: a hardcover book (with dust jacket) containing artwork, and with the CD slotted into the inside back cover.

== Track listing ==
All tracks are written by Örvar Þóreyjarson Smárason, Gunnar Örn Tynes and Kristín Anna Valtýsdóttir, except where noted.

No.	Title	Writer(s)	Length
1.	"Hú hviss – A Ship"		1:27
2.	"Weeping Rock, Rock"		6:18
3.	"Nightly Cares"		4:58
4.	"The Ghosts You Draw on My Back"	Smárason; Tynes; K. A. Valtýsdóttir; Samuli Kosminen	4:14
5.	"Stir"		2:41
6.	"Sing Me Out the Window"		4:42
7.	"The Island of Children's Children"		5:16
8.	"Away"		1:28
9.	"Oh, How the Boat Drifts"	Smárason; Tynes; K. A. Valtýsdóttir; Gyða Valtýsdóttir	5:11
10.	"Small Deaths Are the Saddest"		1:30
11.	"Will the Summer Make Good for All of Our Sins?"		4:02
12.	"Abandoned Ship Bells"		5:03
Total length:			46:50

== Personnel ==
Credits are adapted from the album's liner notes.

Additional musicians

- Ólöf Arnalds – guitar, viola, Stroh violin, xylophone, backing vocals
- Girls from Austurbæjarskóli (Ársól Þóra Sigurðardóttir, Brynja Siggeirsdóttir, Halla Björg Sigurþórsdóttir, Perla Hafþórsdóttir, Vigdís Perla Maack and Viktoria Sigurðardóttir) – vocals on "Weeping Rock, Rock"
- Samuli Kosminen – drums, percussion, sampler
- Eiríkur Orri Ólafsson – trumpet, pianette, Moog synthesizer, whistle
- Adam Pierce – harp
- Halldór Arnar Úlfarsson – halldorophone

Production

- Graeme Durham – editing
- Orri Jónsson – mixing, recording
- Múm – mixing
- Mandy Parnell – mastering

Design

- Dave Howell – artwork
- Dave Thomas – artwork

== Charts ==
Chart (2004)	Peak position
Belgian Albums (Ultratop Flanders)	85
Belgian Alternative Albums (Ultratop Flanders)	40
French Albums (SNEP)	129
Irish Albums (IRMA)	45
Italian Albums (FIMI)	56
UK Albums (OCC)	159
UK Independent Albums (OCC)	27
US Top Dance/Electronic Albums (Billboard)	11
