= Jack & Diane (film) =

2012 film by Bradley Rust Gray

- Theatrical release poster
- Directed by: Bradley Rust Gray
- Written by: Bradley Rust Gray
- Produced by: Bradley Rust Gray; Jen Gatien; Karin Chien; So Yong Kim
- Starring: Riley Keough; Juno Temple; Cara Seymour; Kylie Minogue
- Cinematography: Anne Misawa
- Edited by: Bradley Rust Gray; So Yong Kim
- Music by: múm
- Production companies: Deerjen Films; RCR Media Group
- Distributed by: Magnolia Pictures
- Release dates: April 20, 2012 (Tribeca Film Festival); November 2, 2012 (United States)
- Running time: 105 minutes
- Country: United States
- Language: English
- Box office: $1,142

Jack & Diane is a 2012 American romantic horror film written and directed by Bradley Rust Gray, starring Riley Keough and Juno Temple.

== Plot ==
Diane is an English girl in her late teens who is visiting with her aunt in New York and suffers from chronic nosebleeds. She checks herself in a mirror and transforms into a werewolf-like monster before falling unconscious. Earlier, she had walked the streets trying to borrow a cellphone to call her twin sister, Karen. Having no luck, she enters a clothing store and asks to use a phone. There, she meets a girl her age, Jack, who presents as butch and is instantly smitten by Diane. Diane's nose starts bleeding again, and Jack helps her. Jack then takes Diane to a nightclub. Diane seems nauseated and goes to the restroom. Once she feels better, she meets up with Jack, and the girls passionately kiss.

By morning, the girls part ways, and Jack is hit by a car, though not badly harmed. At her aunt's home, Diane is reprimanded by Aunt Linda, who tells her she is grounded. Both girls feel misunderstood by their respective parent figures. Diane visits Jack at her home. Jack confides in Diane about a cassette tape with the song "Only You" that she kept as a memento of her late brother. Not having access to a personal phone, Diane asks her sister Karen to call Jack pretending to be Diane. When Jack tries to have phone sex with her, Karen reveals she's not really Diane. The next day, Jack visits Diane at her aunt's, and the girls get into an argument when Linda intentionally tells Jack about Diane soon leaving to attend fashion school in Paris with her sister. This, along with the fake phone call, angers Jack, who leaves abruptly.

With Jack no longer wanting to be with her, Diane feels desolate. Meanwhile, Jack hangs out with a colleague, Tara. They have an intimate moment, but Jack rebuffs her shortly thereafter. The next day, Diane hangs out in the store where Jack works with one of Jack's friends, Chris, to Jack's annoyance. Jack asks Diane to leave, but Diane challenges her to a childish game. Jack wins, so Diane is forced to go. Jack returns to Chris, who has found a video of Diane's sister being raped on an adult website. Despite their falling out, Jack seeks out Diane to tell her about the video. After Diane talks to Karen on the phone, she and Jack reconcile. Diane wants to go back home to be with Karen, but Karen refuses. Diane says she has always felt like the stronger sister.

Over the next few days, Jack and Diane spend a lot of time together. One night, Diane dreams of transforming into a monster and devouring Jack's heart. She wakes up to find Jack at her side with blood gushing from her nose. As the days narrow down before Diane has to leave for school, the bond between the two girls is threatened by the upcoming separation. While they are in a locker room retrieving Diane's suitcases, the lights suddenly go off. In the dark, Diane is startled by the monster she had previously dreamed of transforming into. Jack visits Diane on her last day in New York, and the two girls console each other, finally letting go of their fears.

After a few weeks, Diane receives a cassette player with the tape made by Jack's brother. She turns on the song and listens to it deeply.

== Cast ==
- Juno Temple as Diane
  - Temple also plays Diane's twin sister Karen, who is only heard through the phone and seen in a video
- Riley Keough as Jack
- Cara Seymour as Aunt Linda
- Kylie Minogue as Tara
- Haviland Morris as Jack's mother
- Dane DeHaan as Chris
- Michael Chernus as Jaimie
- Lou Taylor Pucci as Tom
- Neal Huff as Jerry

== Production ==
Olivia Thirlby and Elliot Page (Note: Credited as Ellen Page) were originally cast for the lead roles in 2008 before the project was postponed.

Page's role was later replaced by Alison Pill, who also ended up not being in the film either.

== Music ==
Australian singer Kylie Minogue and Icelandic band Múm recorded and released a promotional single, "Whistle", for the soundtrack.

== Reception ==
Jack & Diane received mixed to negative reviews. It currently holds a 15% rating on Rotten Tomatoes, based on 27 reviews with an average rating of 4.00/10. On Metacritic, it has a weighted average rating of 45 out of 100 based on 11 reviews, signifying "mixed or average" reviews.
