= Gyða Valtýsdóttir =

Icelandic musician (born 1982)

Gyða Valtýsdóttir (born 5 January 1982) is an Icelandic musician and multi-instrumentalist and winner of the 2019 Nordic Council Music Prize. She was an original member of the experimental music group Múm and has released four full-length solo albums, created music for films, installations, theater and dance.

== Career ==
Gyða began her music career in her early teens when she co-founded the experimental music pop-group Múm in the late 1990s together with Örvar Smárason, Gunnar Tynes and her twin sister Kristín Anna. She left the band after the release of Finally We Are No One (2002). In 2004 she graduated with B-Mus in instrumental studies from the Iceland University of the Arts where her main teacher was cellist Gunnar Kvaran. In 2004–2005 she continued studying classical music at the Rimsky-Korsakov Conservatory of St. Petersburg and in 2010 she graduated with a double master's degree from the Musik Akademie, Basel, Switzerland where her main teachers were the cellist and composer Thomas Demenga and violist, composer and improviser Walter Fähndrich.

Gyða has created music for films, installations and dance. Her long list of collaborators includes Josephine Foster, Dustin O'Halloran, Jónsi (from Sigur Rós), Damien Rice, Kronos Quartet, Kjartan Sveinsson, Skúli Sverrisson, Ólöf Arnalds, Colin Stetson, Úlfur Hansson, Ben Frost, Shahzad Ismaily, Julian Sartorius, Winged Victory for the Sullen, Aaron Dessner & Bryce Dessner (from The National), visual-artist Ragnar Kjartansson and film director Guy Maddin to name but few.

Gyða's first solo album, Epicycle, was released worldwide in 2017, winning Album of the Year at the Iceland Music Awards and Kraumur Music Award. The album is a collection of pieces by the likes of Schubert, Schumann and Messiaen as well as more experimental composers like Harry Partch and George Crumb. Collaborators on the album are Shahzad Ismaily, Hilmar Jensson, Michael York, Julian Sartorius and Danny Tunick.

Gyða's first album comprising her original compositions, Evolution, was released in fall 2018 on figureight records, co-produced by Alex Somers. Other collaborators on the album are Shahzad Ismaily, Albert Finnbogason, Aaron Roche, Julian Sartorius and Úlfur Hansson. The album was nominated for the Nordic Music Prize in 2019 and chosen the album of the year 2018 in the open category at the Iceland Music Prize.

In 2020 she released her album Epicycle II with newly commissioned pieces written for Gyða by Icelandic musicians Skúli Sverrisson, Ólöf Arnalds, María Huld Markan Sigfúsdóttir, Kjartan Sveinsson, Úlfur Hansson, Jónsi, Daníel Bjarnason and Anna Thorvaldsdottir.

In 2019 Gyda received the prestigious Nordic Council Music Price for her music and performance, the jury calling her distinct vocals and instrumental inventiveness ”highly unique & captivating”.

== In popular culture ==
Along with her twin sister, Gyða appeared on the cover of the Belle and Sebastian album Fold Your Hands Child, You Walk Like a Peasant.

== Discography ==
=== Solo albums ===
- 2013 Serenade Vapour 7”
- 2016 Epicycle
- 2018 Evolution
- 2018 MIKHEL (soundtrack)
- 2020 Epicycle II
- 2021 Ox

=== Albums with múm ===
- 1999 Yesterday Was Dramatic – Today Is OK
- 1999 Náttúruóperan. Music for a play by Andri Snær Magnason
- 1999 Flugmaður. Music with poetry by Andri Snær Magnason
- 2001 Blái hnötturinn (for theater)
- 2002 Finally We Are No One
- 2006 The Peel Session
- 2012 Smilewound

=== Also appears on ===
- 2004 In A Safe Place by The Album Leaf
- 2007 Go Go Smear the Poison Ivy by múm
- 2009 Sing Along To Songs You Don't Know by múm
- 2012 Feathermagnetik by Kira Kira
- 2013 Let My Hands Be Your Guide by Chantal Acda
- 2013 I'm A Dreamer by Josephine Foster
- 2014 My Favorite Faded Fantasy by Damien Rice
- 2015 Thinking Like a Mountain by Merz
- 2016 Sorrow by Colin Stetson
- 2016 No More Lamps in the Morning by Josephine Foster
- 2017 Ósómaljóð (Megas syngur Ósómaljóð Þorvaldar Þorsteinssonar).
- 2017 Arborecence by Úlfur Hansson
- 2018 Alchemy & Friends by Kira Kira
- 2018 Faithful Fairy Harmony by Josephine Foster
- 2019 I Must be the Devil by Kristín Anna

=== Music for films ===
- 2018 MIHKEL by Ari Alexsander Ergis
- 2018 Due piccoli italiani (Two Little Italians) by Paolo Sassanelli
- 2019 Síðasta haustið (Last Autumn) by Yrsa Roca Fannberg
