= Please Smile My Noise Bleed =

EP by múm
- Released: October 2001
- Genre: Electronica
- Length: 45:51
- Label: Morr

Professional ratings
Review scores
Source	Rating
Allmusic	link
Pitchfork Media	8.7/10 link

Please Smile My Noise Bleed is an album by the Icelandic group múm. It was released on the Morr Music label in 2001.

== Track listing ==
1. "On the Old Mountain Radio" – 5:11
2. "Please Sing My Spring Reverb" – 5:20
3. "Please Sing My Spring Reverb" (Styromix by Styrofoam) – 5:33
4. "Please Sing My Spring Reverb" (Caetena mix by I.S.A.N.) – 4:17
5. "Flow Not So Fast Old Mountain Radio" – 1:28
6. "Please Sing My Spring Reverb" (Phonem mix) – 6:39
7. "On the Old Mountain Radio" (Christian Kleine mix) – 6:16
8. "Please Sing My Spring Reverb" (AMX mix by Arovane) – 5:39
9. "Please Sing My Spring Reverb" (B. Fleischmann mix) – 5:24
