= Sigurlaug Gísladóttir =

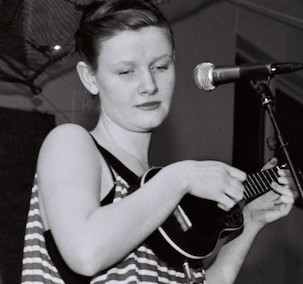
- Sigurlaug in 2009

Background information
- Born: 16 October 1984 (age 41)
- Occupations: Singer; songwriter; musician
- Instrument: Ukulele
- Member of: Múm; Mr. Silla & Mongoose

Sigurlaug Gísladóttir (born 16 October 1984) is a singer and songwriter. She grew up in Copenhagen and later moved to Iceland and got a B.A. in visual arts.

She performs under the stage name Mr. Silla. Sigurlaug teamed up with Magnús B. Skarphéðinsson to form the duo Mr. Silla & Mongoose. Together, they have performed at Iceland Airwaves two times and have released an album called Foxbite.

Sigurlaug has also been a member of the band Múm and performed together with Snorri Helgason, Low Roar, and Mice Parade.
