= Feels (Animal Collective album) =

Studio album by Animal Collective
- Released: October 18, 2005
- Recorded: March 2005
- Studio: Gravel Voice (Seattle)
- Genre: Indie rock; freak folk; psychedelic rock; experimental rock
- Length: 51:48
- Label: FatCat
- Producer: Animal Collective

Animal Collective chronology
Prospect Hummer (2005)	Feels (2005)	People (2006)

Singles from Feels
- 1. "Grass" Released: September 26, 2005; 2. "The Purple Bottle" Released: 2006

Feels is the sixth studio album by American experimental pop band Animal Collective, released on October 18, 2005 by FatCat Records. The album received acclaim from music critics, and was included at number 55 on Pitchfork's list of "The 200 Best Albums of the 2000s". As of 2008, Feels sold 55,000 copies in the US.

== Recording ==
Feels is known for its unconventional guitar sounds, which were obtained in part by the unique tuning the band used (E G# E G# B E). Animal Collective member Brian "Geologist" Weitz explained how they created and used this tuning on the Collected Animals message board:

"All the songs on Feels are tuned to our friends piano which was out of tune to begin with. Dave and I made loops from recordings of him playing her piano, and we used those loops in the early songwriting process for feels. So since those loops are premade and can't be tuned, the guitars have to be tuned to the loops. it's not out of tune in any traditional whole step/half step kind of way...we're talking microtonally out of tune after years of not being professionally tuned and subtle natural detuning. Kind of like if you played guitar in standard tuning for years but never once re-tuned it to make sure it was right. It would have its own unique out-of-tune tuning based on what strings you played most often, how hard you played it, the temperature in the room, the humidity, etc... When we went into the studio it ruled over everything we did. Even Doctess's live piano playing required us bringing in a professional piano tuner, playing him a minidisc recording of our friend's out of tune piano, and having him try to de-tune the studio's piano in exactly the same way our friend's was. Without those recordings or the loops dave and i made, you wouldn't be able to get it exact unless you tune to the album while it's playing, and even then, you'd have to know which loop in the album we use to tune, which one chord it is, and because of the way we mixed the loop in, it is almost impossible to separate from dave's guitar. I'll never forget when the tuner finished (we had to wait to start recording until he finished) and he stood up from the bench and went 'there you go, the piano's perfectly out of tune.'"

Feels is the first album to feature significant contributions from musicians outside its core members. Geologist described the contributions of Kristín "Doctess" Valtýsdóttir (at that time married to band member Avey Tare) and the recording process on the Collected Animals message board:

"kristin plays on every song. she played live as we did the live tracking but there was often a lot of bleed into the piano mics from the other instruments so she often re-did or elaborated on her parts at night when she could have quiet in the studio. we all played in one room so there was so [sic] isolation, except josh's guitar amps which we stuck in a bathroom."

Geologist also described working with viola player Eyvind Kang on the Collected Animals message board:

"he was only there for an afternoon. we had sent him live recordings of the songs we wanted him on (daffy, bees, fickle cycle, and people) but he never had a chance to listen to them. so he came in and would listen to each track once, then talk with us about ideas, and then just improvise over the song. as scott [Colburn] predicted (he has worked with eyvind many times over the last 10 years), he never hit a wrong note. it was pretty mindblowing to watch. he played violin, viola, and tried some traditional Chinese instrument, which we took out [of the final recording] because it didn't mix so well. wish we had more time to jam because i'm sure it [would] have [been] a lot of fun. dave [aka Avey Tare] and i had been thinking about who to ask to play violin on a few songs that we wanted violin on, and eyvind was our first choice. we'd been big fans of his since first hearing him play violin on a sun city girls record in the mid-90s. it was kind of just great luck that he was our first choice and that scott knew him and had recorded him a bunch, and that he lived in the seattle area. when i first asked him if he'd be interested his crucial question was what we wanted out of a violin part in a song. did we want it to stand out melodically so a listener would say, oh here comes the violin part, or did we want him to explore the violin and how it would fit into the song (i.e. doing noise, more textural parts)? i replied the latter and he was stoked. that was the ultimate reason we chose him. he's so good at exploring and pushing the limits of his instruments. he can master the pretty and melodic stuff, harsh noise music, trancey drones, etc."

Engineer Scott Colburn also provided a few details about recording Feels on the Collected Animals message board (under the username "Scooter") "Feels started on tape and ended up in Nuendo...The vocals had effects on them, but they were no different than the effects used live. BUTT [sic], each vocal track was recorded with 6 microphones, thereby creating a whole new effect."

== Title and artwork ==
The cover art is reminiscent of the work of artist Henry Darger. Its creator, the group's singer Dave Portner, has been a huge fan of Darger but didn't have Darger in mind while creating the cover art. He found a children's educational guide on the street and thought "the images fit the sound and the lyrics perfectly." In an interview, Kria Brekkan, Portner's ex-wife, revealed the origin of the title, "I think what I brought to it perhaps got channeled through Dave's creativity and so on. We had been intense pan-pals [sic] for nearly a year, at the time when it was recorded, and when my friends saw the album cover, they thought it was my art, and they laughed about the title because it came from my use of English. I used the word "feels" for feelings."

== Critical reception ==
Professional ratings
Aggregate scores
Source	Rating
Metacritic	84/100
Review scores
Source	Rating
AllMusic	4.5/5 stars
Entertainment Weekly	A
The Guardian	4/5 stars
Mojo	4/5 stars
NME	8/10
Pitchfork	9.0/10
Q	4/5 stars
Rolling Stone	3/5 stars
Spin	A−
Uncut	4/5 stars

Feels received widespread acclaim from music critics. At Metacritic, which assigns a normalized rating out of 100 to reviews from mainstream publications, the album received an average score of 84, based on 35 reviews. Mark Richardson of Pitchfork wrote, "Feels is an excellent record, one that, despite a more conventional approach, happens to get better over time." AllMusic critic John Bush said, "The group sounds freer than ever before, almost as though they've never bothered with rock in their lives, and have only happened upon a bare few LPs before beginning their recording career." The Guardian's Betty Clarke wrote, "Swapping campfire cosiness for expansive joy, they sound so accomplished the Flaming Lips comparisons fall by the wayside."

The album placed third in The Wire's annual critics' poll.

== Track listing ==
All tracks are written by Animal Collective.

No.	Title	Length
1.	"Did You See the Words"	5:14
2.	"Grass"	3:00
3.	"Flesh Canoe"	3:44
4.	"The Purple Bottle"	6:48
5.	"Bees"	5:38
6.	"Banshee Beat"	8:22
7.	"Daffy Duck"	7:34
8.	"Loch Raven"	5:00
9.	"Turn Into Something"	6:28
Total length:		51:48

Bonus disc
No.	Title	Length
10.	"Banshee Beat" (live at Haverford, PA)	11:47
11.	"Loch Raven" (live at Haverford, PA)	6:43
12.	"Did You See the Words" (live at Chapel Hill, NC)	6:30
13.	"Wastered" (live at Toronto, ON)	3:50

== Personnel ==
Credits adapted from the liner notes of Feels.

Animal Collective

- Animal Collective – mixing
- Avey Tare
- Panda Bear
- Geologist
- Deakin

Additional personnel

- Doctess – piano
- Eyvind Kang – violin
- Scott Colburn – recording, engineering
- Alan Douches – mastering
