= Slowblow =

Icelandic musical duo

- Origin: Reykjavík, Iceland
- Genres: Electronic, lo-fi, folk
- Years active: Early 1990s–present
- Labels: Sirkafúsk Records, Kitchen Motors, Mobile / Plug
- Members: Orri Jónsson; Dagur Kári Pétursson

Slowblow is an Icelandic musical duo consisting of Orri Jónsson and Dagur Kári Pétursson, formed in the early 1990s. Their music is an aesthetic of home-made, lo-fi analog tinkerings, which often slips into both electronic and folksy terrain. They began recording in the mid-1990s and have made several albums together. They created the soundtrack for the successful independent Icelandic movie Nói Albínói (e. Noi the Albino), which Dagur directed. They have worked with other Icelandic artists such as former Múm band member Kristín Anna Valtýsdóttir, who provided vocals on the band's self-titled 2004 album, and Emilíana Torrini. In 2009 the duo provided the music to the film The Good Heart. They have released albums under the Reykjavík based record labels Smekkleysa, Kitchen Motors, and Mobile / Plug.

== Discography ==
=== Albums ===
- Quicksilver Tuna (1994), Sirkafúsk
- Fousque (1996), Sirkafúsk
- Nói Albínói (2004), Kitchen Motors
- Slowblow (2004), Mobile / Plug
