= Fousque =

Studio album by Slowblow
- Released: 1996
- Genre: Electronic, lo-fi, indie
- Length: 33:21
- Label: Sirkafúsk Records
- Producer: Slowblow

Slowblow chronology
Quicksilver Tuna (1994)	Fousque (1996)	Nói Albínói (2004)

Fousque is an album by Slowblow, released in 1996. The album was originally released in fall 1996 at Sirkafúsk Records and was re-released by Smekkleysa in 2004. The vocals on "7-up Days" were by Emilíana Torrini.

== Track listing ==
1. "Dusty Couch" - 2:35
2. "7-up Days" - 3:48
3. "Fever" - 4:05
4. "Broken Watch" - 2:26
5. "Ghost of Me" - 3:59
6. "La Luna E Bianca" - 1:57
7. "Sack the Organist" - 2:28
8. "Farm Song" - 3:48
9. "Surf" - 3:02
10. "My Life Underwater" - 5:13
