= FM Belfast =

Icelandic electro-pop band

- Origin: Reykjavík, Iceland
- Genre: Electro-Pop
- Years active: 2005–present
- Labels: World Champion Records, Records Records (IS)
- Members: Lóa Hlín Hjálmtýsdóttir; Árni Rúnar Hlöðversson (Plúseinn); Örvar Þóreyjarson Smárason; Egill Eyjólfsson; Ívar Pétur Kjartansson
- Past members: Árni Vilhjálmsson
- Website: www.fmbelfast.com

FM Belfast is an electro-pop band from Reykjavík, Iceland. Its members include Lóa Hlín Hjálmtýsdóttir, Árni Rúnar Hlöðversson, Örvar Þóreyjarson Smárason, Egill Eyjólfsson and Ívar Pétur Kjartansson.

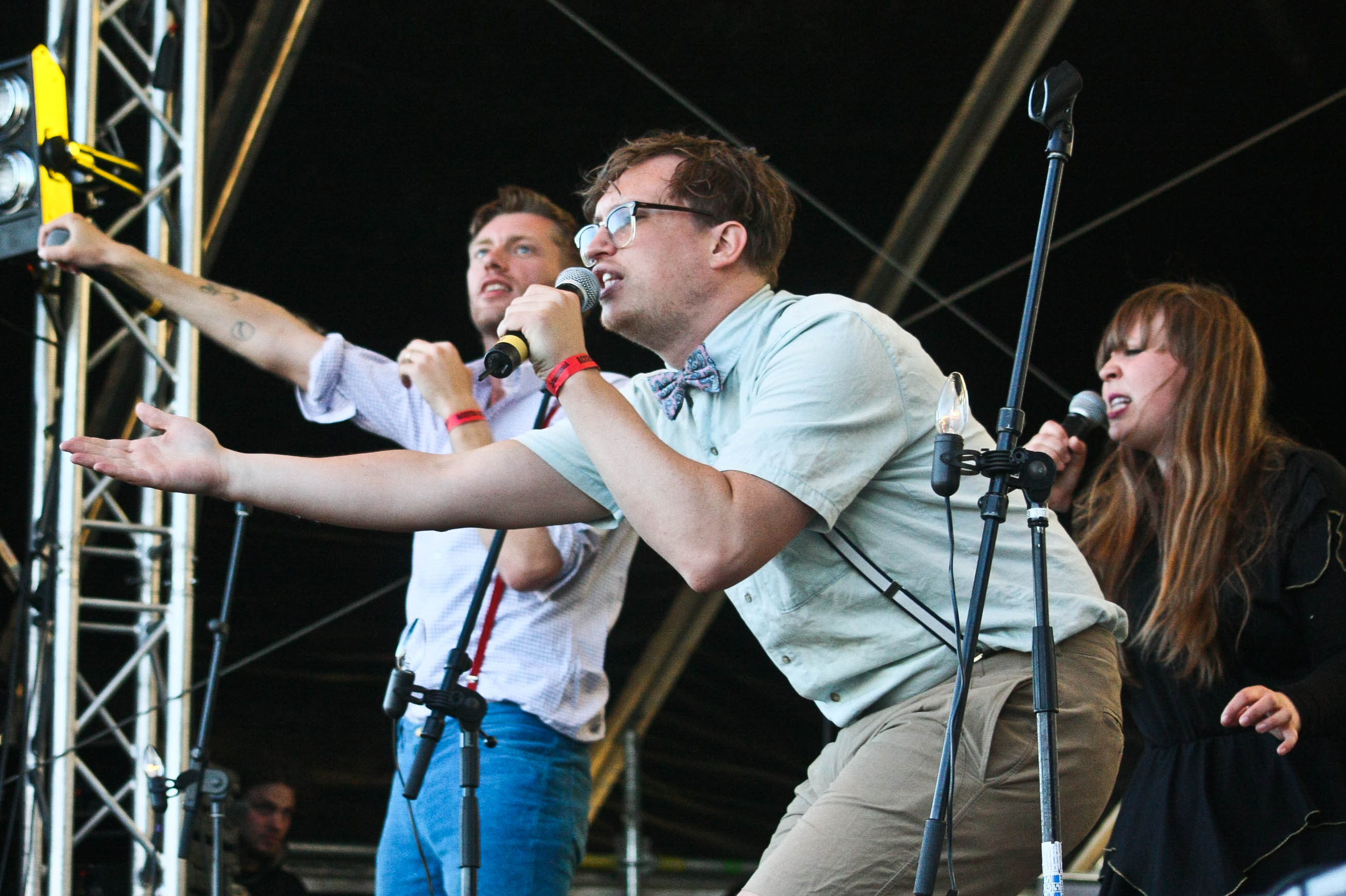
Fm belfast sonnenrot festival 2011

== History ==
FM Belfast formed in late 2005 as a duo of Árni Rúnar Hlöðversson (Plúseinn) and Lóa Hlín Hjálmtýsdóttir, but didn't really get going properly until Árni Vilhjálmsson and Örvar Þóreyjarson Smárason joined. The band was a studio project for some time until the Iceland Airwaves festival 2006 when the band expanded into a full-on live act. The members now vary from 3 to 8 depending on member availability. The core of the band is made up of Árni Rúnar Hlöðversson (Plúseinn, Hairdoctor, Motion Boys), Lóa Hlín Hjálmtýsdóttir, Örvar Þóreyjarson Smárason (múm, Borko, Skakkamanage), Egill Eyjólfsson, and Ívar Pétur Kjartansson. They are joined sometimes by Sveinbjorn Hermann Pálsson (Terrordisco), Björn Kristjánsson (Borko, Skakkamanage), Birgitta Birgisdóttir and Eiríkur Orri (múm, Kira Kira, Benni Hemm Hemm).

The band's live show often features many percussionists, among them are Sveinbjörn Pálsson, Björn Kristjánsson (Borko), Halli Civelek, Svanhvít Tryggvadóttir, Unnsteinn Manuel Stefánsson (Retro Stefson) and Þórður jörundsson (Retro Stefson).

Their first album was recorded in New York and Iceland, with the group recording, mixing, and mastering it, and creating the album artwork themselves.

Árni Vilhjálmsson has since left FM Belfast.

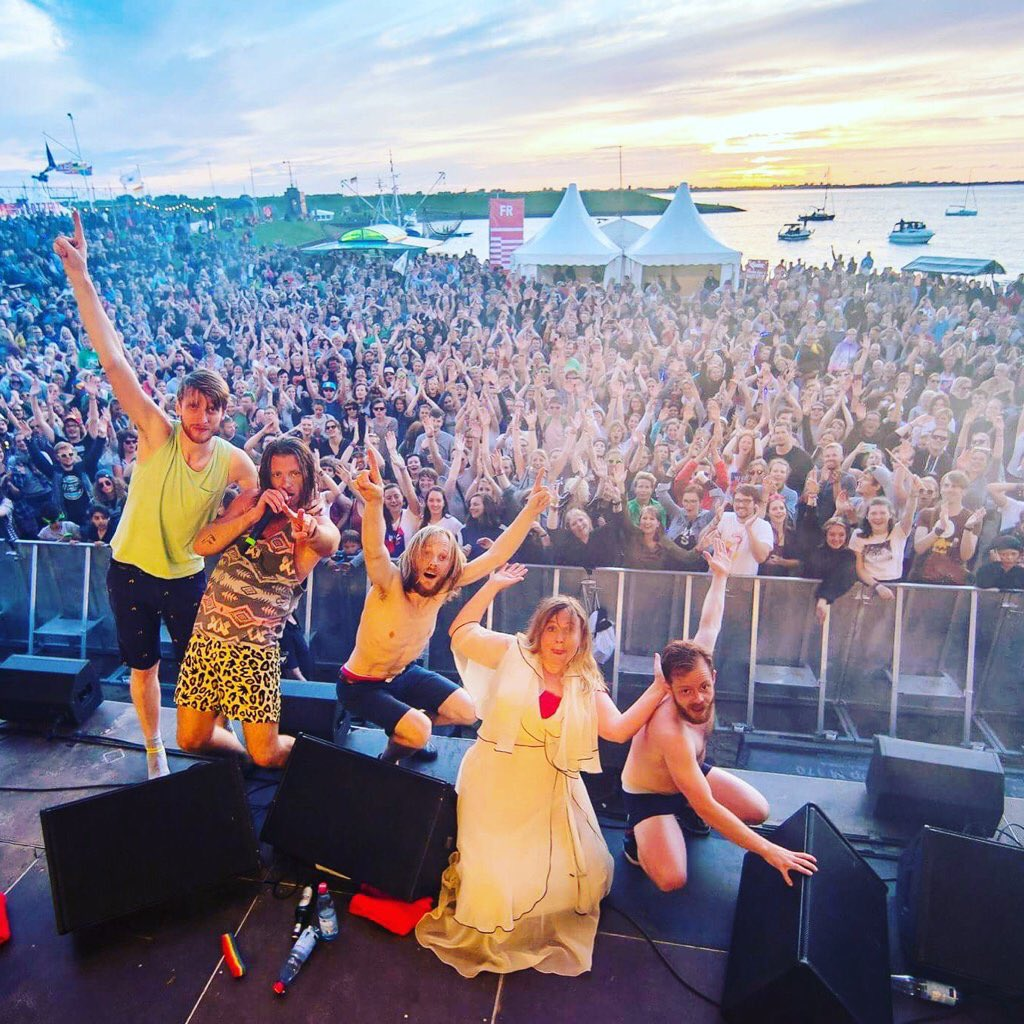
Watt En Schlick 2016

== Discography ==
=== Albums ===
- How to Make Friends (2008)
- Don't Want to Sleep (2011)
- Brighter Days (2014)
- Island Broadcast (2017)

=== Singles ===
- Lotus (Killing in the name) (2008)
- Beint í æð (2014)
- You're so pretty; All My Power (2017)
- Útihátíð (2024)

Featured in

- Back & Spine (Kasper Bjørke featuring FM Belfast) (2007)
