= Prins Póló =

Icelandic singer songwriter (1977–2022)

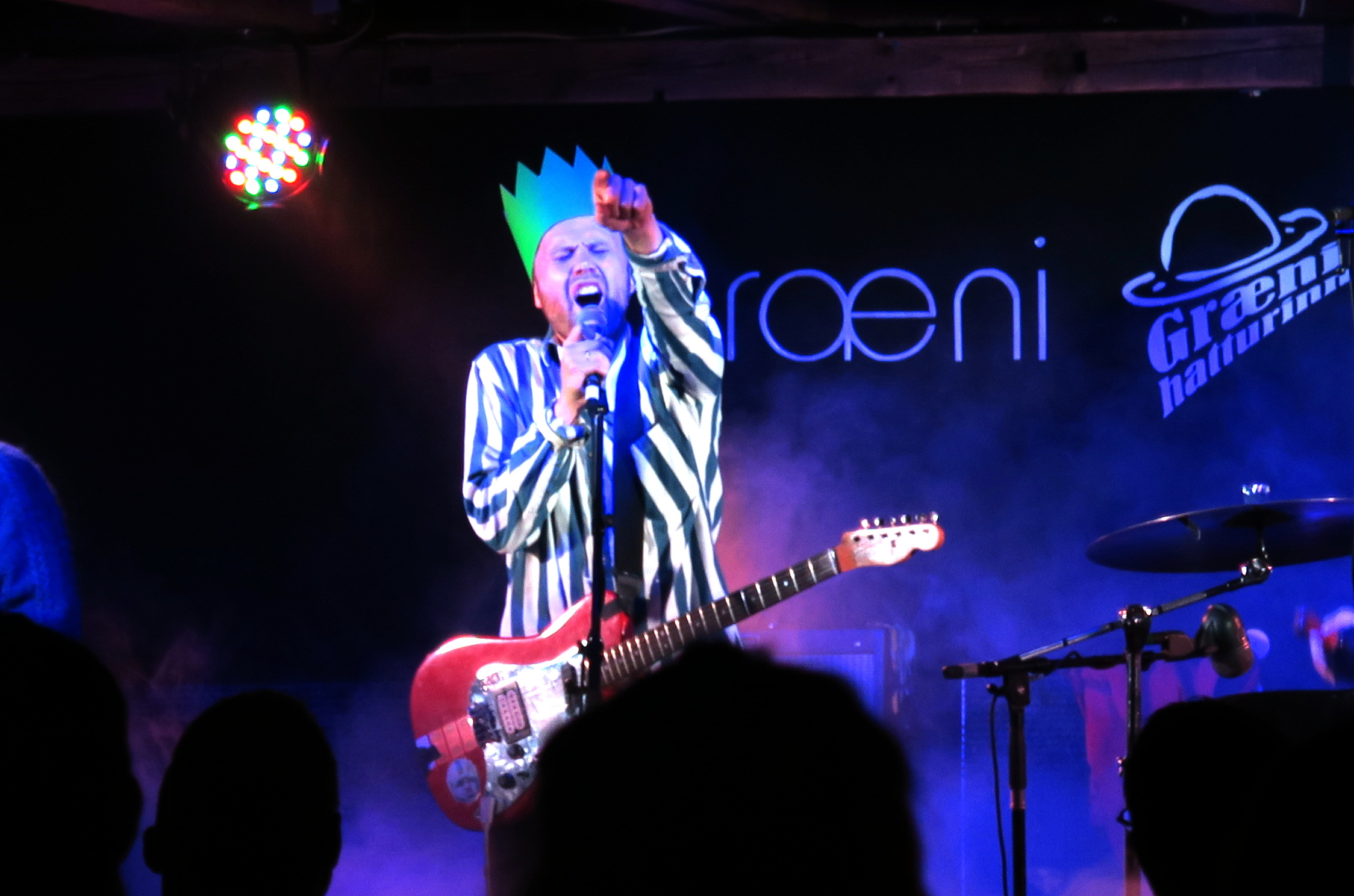
- Prins Póló playing at a concert in Akureyri

Background information
- Born: Svavar Pétur Eysteinsson; 26 April 1977; Breiðholt, Iceland
- Died: 29 September 2022 (aged 45)
- Occupations: Singer-songwriter; experimental artist
- Website: havari.is

Svavar Pétur Eysteinsson (26 April 1977 – 29 September 2022), better known by his stage name Prins Póló, was an Icelandic singer-songwriter and experimental artist. He was also part of the Icelandic band Skakkamanage.

== Skakkamanage ==
Skakkamanage
- Origin: Iceland
- Years active: 2000s
- Past members: Svavar Pétur Eysteinsson; Berglind Häsler; Þormóður Dagsson; Örn Ingi Ágústsson

Svavar Pétur Eysteinsson started his career in the mid-2000s when he developed the alternative rock band Skakkamanage that released three albums: Lab of Love in 2006, followed by All Over The Face in 2008. The latter album was nominated for "Best Album" in Iceland Kraumur Awards.

The band made a comeback in 2014 with the album Sounds of Merrymaking with "Free From Love" released as a single from the latter album.

Skakkamanage is made up of:

- Svavar Pétur Eysteinsson - vocals
- Berglind Häsler - keyboards
- Þormóður Dagsson - drums
- Örn Ingi Ágústsson - bass

== Solo career ==
Being front man of the band, Svavar Pétur Eysteinsson also developed a solo career taking Prins Póló as an alter-ego for himself.

Prins Póló sings about social issues with often quirky lyrics, catchy tunes and theatrics wearing various masks and head sets and trademark paper crowns designed for him and charismatic live performances. At times, performances are done with various Icelandic music formations like FM Belfast, Reykjavík! and Sudden Weather Change. He released his EP Einn heima in 2009 followed by two studio albums Jukk (2010) and Sorrí (2014). In 2019, he released the albums Túrbó and Falskar minningar.

== Illness and death ==
Pétur was diagnosed with stage 4 cancer in 2018. He died in September 2022, at the age of 45.

== Discography: Skakkamanage ==
=== Albums ===
- 2006: Lab of Love
- 2008: All Over the Face
- 2014: Sounds of Merrymaking

=== Singles ===
- 2014: Free from Love

== Discography: Solo ==
(credited as Prinspóló (until 2012) and Prins Póló 2013 and later)

=== Albums ===
- 2010: Jukk
- 2014: Sorrí
- 2014: París Norðursins
- 2018: Þriðja Kryddið
- 2019: Túrbó
- 2019: Falskar minningar

=== EPs ===
- 2009: Einn heima EP

=== Singles ===
- 2011: "Niðrá strönd"
- 2012: "Tipp Topp"
- 2012: "Lúxuslíf"
- 2012: "Föstudagsmessa"
- 2012: "Landspítalinn"
- 2013: "Bragðarefir"
- 2014: "Fallegi smiðurinn"
- 2014: "París Norðursins"
- 2014: "Kalt á toppnum" (with Baggalútur)
- 2016: "Sandalar"
- 2016: "Læda Slæda"
- 2016: "Hamster Charm"
- 2016: "Dúllur"
