= Blái hnötturinn =

Soundtrack album by múm
- Released: 2001
- Genre: Electronica
- Length: 34:17
- Label: None

Blái hnötturinn is an album by the Icelandic group múm. It is a soundtrack composed for the children's play Blái hnötturinn (The Blue Planet) by Andri Snær Magnason. All profits revert to the Red Cross.

== Track listing ==
1. Untitled – 2:26
2. Untitled – 4:20
3. Untitled – 0:16
4. Untitled – 0:57
5. Untitled – 0:30
6. Untitled – 1:00
7. Untitled – 1:38
8. Untitled – 1:34
9. Untitled – 3:26
10. Untitled – 2:33
11. Untitled – 3:30
12. Untitled – 3:19
13. Untitled – 1:19
14. Untitled – 0:50
15. Untitled – 2:31
16. Untitled – 3:40
17. Untitled – 0:22
