= Finland in the Eurovision Song Contest 1998 =

- Eurovision Song Contest 1998
- Participating broadcaster: Yleisradio (Yle)
- Country: Finland
- Selection process: Euroviisut 1998
- Selection date: 14 February 1998

Competing entry
- Song: "Aava"
- Artist: Edea
- Songwriters: Alexi Ahoniemi; Tommy Mansikka-Aho

Placement
- Final result: 15th, 22 points

Participation chronology

Finland was represented at the Eurovision Song Contest 1998 with the song "Aava", composed by Alexi Ahoniemi, with lyrics by Tommy Mansikka-Aho, and performed by the group Edea. The Finnish participating broadcaster, Yleisradio (Yle), organised the national final Euroviisut 1998. Yle returned to the contest after a one-year absence following its relegation from 1997 as one of the six entrants with the least average points over the preceding four contests.

Nine entries were selected to compete in the national final on 14 February 1998 where the combination of votes from an eight-member expert jury, an eight-member OGAE jury and votes from the public selected "Aava" performed by Edea as the winner.

Finland competed in the Eurovision Song Contest which took place on 9 May 1998. Performing during the show in position 21, Finland placed fifteenth out of the 25 participating countries, scoring 22 points.

== Background ==
Prior to the 1998 contest, Yleisradio (Yle) had participated in the Eurovision Song Contest representing Finland thirty-four times since its first entry in 1961. Its best result in the contest achieved in 1973 where the song "Tom Tom Tom" performed by Marion Rung placed sixth.

As part of its duties as participating broadcaster, Yle organises the selection of its entry in the Eurovision Song Contest and broadcasts the event in the country. The broadcaster has been selected its entries through national final competitions that have varied in format over the years. Since 1961, a selection show that was often titled Euroviisukarsinta highlighted that the purpose of the program was to select a song for Eurovision. The broadcaster selected its entry for the 1998 contest again through the Euroviisut selection show.

== Before Eurovision ==
=== Euroviisut 1998 ===
Euroviisut 1998 was the national final organised by Yle to select its entry for the Eurovision Song Contest 1998. The competition consisted of a final on 14 February 1998, held at the Yle Studio 2 in Helsinki and hosted by Finnish presenter Olga K and Finnish presenter/producer/director Sami Aaltonen. The show was broadcast on Yle TV1 and was watched by 1.21 million viewers in Finland.

==== Competing entries ====
A panel of six experts appointed by Yle selected nine entries for the competition from the 189 submissions received during a submission period and from composers directly invited by the broadcaster. Seven of the competing entries came from the invited composers, while the remaining two entries came from the open submission.

Artist	Song	Songwriter(s)
Edea	"Aava"	Tommy Mansikka-Aho, Alexi Ahoniemi
Elena Mady	"Honeymoon"	Vera, Maki Kolehmainen, Mika Mettälä
Jari Sillanpää	"Valkeaa unelmaa"	Mika Toivanen, Pekka Laaksonen
Kaija Kärkinen and Ile Kallio	"Maailman laitaan"	Kaija Kärkinen, Ile Kallio
Luka	"Tuun sun luo"	Kari Haapala, Ville Vento
Nylon Beat	"Umm ma ma"	Risto Asikainen, Sipi Castrén
Samuli and Sani	"Olen luonasi sun"	Maki Kolehmainen, Saija Aartela
Sari Kaasinen	"Mielessäni"	Sari Kaasinen
Ultra Bra	"Tyttöjen välisestä ystävyydestä"	Kerkko Koskinen, Anni Sinnemäki

==== Final ====
The final took place on 14 February 1998 where nine entries competed. "Aava" performed by Edea was selected as the winner by a combination of public votes (1/3), an expert jury (1/3) and a panel of Finnish and international OGAE members (1/3). Each voting group distributed their points as follows: 1, 2, 3, 4, 5, 6, 7, 8 and 10 points. 16,708 votes were cast during the show. In addition to the performances of the competing entries, the interval acts featured Sarah Brightman performing "Tú Quieres Volver" and "Who Wants to Live Forever", and Combayah performing "I Like What You Do".

Final – 14 February 1998
R/O	Artist	Song	Jury		OGAE		Televote		Total	Place
R/O	Artist	Song	Votes	Points	Votes	Points	Votes	Points	Total	Place
1	Kaija Kärkinen and Ile Kallio	"Maailman laitaan"	48	5	44	4	534	2	11	7
2	Elena Mady	"Honeymoon"	40	3	33	3	541	3	9	8
3	Nylon Beat	"Umm ma ma"	30	2	73	10	2,297	7	19	3
4	Samuli and Sani	"Olen luonasi sun"	64	8	32	2	1,053	4	14	6
5	Sari Kaasinen	"Mielessäni"	41	4	64	7	2,766	8	19	3
6	Jari Sillanpää	"Valkeaa unelmaa"	49	6	48	5	6,228	10	21	2
7	Ultra Bra	"Tyttöjen välisestä ystävyydestä"	52	7	52	6	1,607	6	19	3
8	Luka	"Tuun sun luo"	27	1	23	1	211	1	3	9
9	Edea	"Aava"	69	10	65	8	1,471	5	23	1

Jury Group Members
Jury	Members
Experts	Maria Guzenina; Ted Curson; Nina Honkanen; Noel Kelehan; Per Møller Hansen; Iris Mattila; Sanna Kojo; Jüri Pihel
OGAE	Jari-Pekka Koikkalainen; Juha Puranen; Marko Myller; Anna Muurinen; Max Mannola; Pasi Vanttaja; Dominique Dufaut; Irving Wolther

== At Eurovision ==
According to Eurovision rules, all nations with the exceptions of the eight countries which had obtained the lowest average number of points over the last five contests competed in the final on 9 May 1998. On 13 November 1997, a special allocation draw was held which determined the running order and Finland was set to perform in position 21, following the entry from Belgium and before the entry from Norway. Edea was accompanied by Mervi Hiltunen and Kaarle Mannila as backing vocalists. Marika Krook's, Edea's singer, costume was designed by Jukka Rintala. The Finnish conductor at the contest was Olli Ahvenlahti, and Finland finished in fifteenth place with 22 points.

The show was televised in Finland on Yle TV1 with commentary by Maria Guzenina and Sami Aaltonen. The show was also broadcast via radio with Finnish commentary by Sanna Kojo on Yle Radio Suomi and with Swedish commentary on Yle Radio Vega. Yle appointed Marjo Wilska as its spokesperson to announce the Finnish votes during the final.

=== Voting ===
Below is a breakdown of points awarded to Finland and awarded by Finland in the contest. The nation awarded its 12 points to Estonia in the contest.

Points awarded to Finland
Score	Country
12 points	
10 points	Estonia; Sweden
8 points	
7 points	
6 points	
5 points	
4 points	
3 points	
2 points	
1 point	Macedonia; Norway

Points awarded by Finland
Score	Country
12 points	Estonia
10 points	Israel
8 points	United Kingdom
7 points	Netherlands
6 points	Sweden
5 points	Malta
4 points	Slovenia
3 points	Croatia
2 points	Norway
1 point	Germany
