= Foxbite =

Studio album by Mr. Silla & Mongoose
- Released: October 22, 2007
- Genre: Electronic, Experimental, Blues
- Length: 54:35
- Label: Raf Raf

Foxbite is the debut album by Icelandic band Mr. Silla & Mongoose. It was released in the days after Iceland Airwaves 2007.

== Track listing ==
1. "Gua" — 2:49
2. "Noodlefeet" — 3:10
3. "Raggedypack" — 4:23
4. "I Don't" — 3:47
5. "Wanna Million" — 3:16
6. "How do you" — 4:22
7. "Ten Foot Bear" — 5:40
8. "Save It For Later" — 4:18
9. "The Devil Has A Prosthetic Leg" — 1:09
10. "Foxbyte" — 3:41
11. "I've Been Hit" — 4:00
12. "Do Not Know" — 3:44
13. "I Only Want Chicken" — 4:55
14. "Say" — 1:22
15. "Organ Deviltry" — 3:22

== Personnel ==
- Magnús Trygvason Eliassen — drums on track 7, 10, 13 and 15.
- James SK Wān — kazoo on track 8 and 14.
- Eiríkur Orri Ólafsson – brass on track 15.
