= Smilewound =

Studio album by múm
- Released: 6 September 2013
- Genre: Electronica, experimental
- Label: Morr Music
- Producer: múm

Múm chronology
Sing Along to Songs You Don't Know (2009)	Smilewound (2013)	History of Silence (2025)

Professional ratings
Review scores
Source	Rating
AllMusic	3.5/5 stars
Pitchfork	5.7/10

Smilewound is the sixth studio album by Icelandic electronic band múm, which released on 6 September 2013 on CD, vinyl and digital download. On 7 September, it was released on cassette for Cassette Store Day.

The first single, "Toothwheels", was released in May, 2013. A video for it was released in June, directed by múm, Árni Rúnar Hlöðversson and Bruno Granato.

== Track listing ==
1. "Toothwheels"
2. "Underwater Snow"
3. "When Girls Collide"
4. "Slow Down"
5. "Candlestick"
6. "One Smile"
7. "Eternity is the Wait Between Breaths"
8. "The Colorful Stabwound"
9. "Sweet Impressions"
10. "Time to Scream and Shout"

Bonus track

1. "Whistle" (with Kylie Minogue)

== Release history ==
Region	Date	Format(s)
Worldwide	6 September 2013	CD, LP, digital download
United Kingdom, United States	7 September 2013	Cassette
United States	17 September 2013	CD, LP, digital download
