= The Peel Session (Múm EP) =

EP by múm
- Released: 4 December 2006
- Recorded: 2002
- Label: Fat Cat

Múm chronology
Dusk Log (2004)	The Peel Session (2006)

Professional ratings
Review scores
Source	Rating
Pitchfork Media	(?)

The Peel Session is an EP by Icelandic band múm that was released in 2006. The songs were recorded at Maida Vale Studios for the band's Peel Session, first broadcast on 3 October 2002.

== Track listing ==
1. "Scratched Bicycle/Smell Memory" — 5:25
2. "Awake on a Train" — 7:58
3. "Now There Is That Fear Again" — 3:57
4. "The Ballad of the Broken String" — 3:56
