= Finland in the Eurovision Song Contest 1996 =

- Eurovision Song Contest 1996
- Participating broadcaster: Yleisradio (Yle)
- Country: Finland
- Selection process: Euroviisut 1996
- Selection date: 5 February 1996

Competing entry
- Song: "Niin kaunis on taivas"
- Artist: Jasmine
- Songwriter: Timo Niemi

Placement
- Final result: 23rd, 9 points

Participation chronology

Finland was represented at the Eurovision Song Contest 1996 with the song "Niin kaunis on taivas", written by Timo Niemi, and performed by Jasmine. The Finnish participating broadcaster, Yleisradio (Yle), organised the national final Euroviisut 1996 in order to select its entry for the contest. Yle returned to the contest after a one-year absence following its relegation from 1995 as one of the bottom nine entrants in 1994.

Ten entries selected to compete in the national final were presented on 3 February 1996 and votes from the public selected "Niin kaunis on taivas" performed by Jasmine as the winner with 67,907 votes, which was announced during a televised programme on 5 February 1996.

Finland was announced among the top 22 entries of the qualifying round on 20 and 21 March 1996 and therefore qualified to compete in the final which took place on 18 May 1996. It was later revealed that Finland placed twenty-second out of the 29 participating countries in the qualifying round with 26 points. Performing during the competition in position 18, Finland placed twenty-third (last) out of the 23 participating countries, scoring 9 points.

== Background ==
Prior to the 1996 contest, Yleisradio (Yle) had participated in the Eurovision Song Contest representing Finland thirty-three times since its first entry in 1961. Its best result in the contest achieved in 1973 where the song "Tom Tom Tom" performed by Marion Rung placed sixth.

As part of its duties as participating broadcaster, Yle organises the selection of its entry in the Eurovision Song Contest and broadcasts the event in the country. The broadcaster has been selected its entries through national final competitions that have varied in format over the years. Since 1961, a selection show that was often titled Euroviisukarsinta highlighted that the purpose of the program was to select a song for Eurovision. The broadcaster selected its entry for the 1996 contest again through the Euroviisut selection show.

== Before Eurovision ==
=== Euroviisut 1996 ===
Euroviisut 1996 was the national final organised by Yle to select its entry for the Eurovision Song Contest 1996. The competition consisted of a final on 3 February 1996, held at the Espoo Cultural Centre in Espoo during the annual Emma-gaala awards show on Yle TV1 and hosted by Finnish presenter Minna Pentti and Finnish scriptwriter/journalist Nina Honkanen. Ten entries selected for the competition from 70 submissions received from record companies competed and the winner was selected based on the results from a public vote, which were revealed by Finland's five telephone regions along with the votes of the venue audience. Among the competing artists was former Finnish Eurovision entrant Kirka who represented Finland in 1984.

Due to a technical failure of the telephone system caused by an unexpectedly large number of votes being cast, the voting was extended until 5 February 1996 and "Niin kaunis on taivas" performed by Jasmine was announced as the winner during a televised programme on the same day. 219,034 votes were cast in the national final, which was watched by 1.2 million viewers in Finland.

Final – 5 February 1996
R/O	Artist	Song	Songwriter(s)	Televote	Place
1	Eini	"Aina sun luonas"	Kari Salli, Turkka Mali	7,285	7
2	Laila and Timo	"Salaisimmat tunteet"	Jokke Seppälä, Jori Nummelin	4,465	10
3	Riot	"Pintaa syvemmältä"	Kustaa Kantelinen	6,379	9
4	Eija Kantola	"Rakkauden kirja"	Mika Toivanen, Jori Nummelin	35,969	2
5	Aikakone	"Ihan hiljaa"	Maki Kolehmainen, Saija Aartela	23,742	5
6	Jasmine	"Niin kaunis on taivas"	Timo Niemi	67,907	1
7	Kirka	"Toukokuu"	Kisu Jernström, Arto Tamminen	29,615	3
8	Inka	"Keinuta mua"	Inka Auhagen	12,599	6
9	Sami	"Auringonkukka"	Aarno Alikoski, Asko Kallonen, Jarno Sarvi	7,236	8
10	Funkykarkurit	"Elämän tivoli"	Janne Kettunen, Torsti Spoof	23,837	4

Detailed Voting Results
R/O	Song	Audience	Televoting Regions					Total
R/O	Song	Audience	Northern Finland	Eastern Finland	Central Finland	Southwestern Finland	Southern Finland	Total
1	"Aina sun luonas"	21	1,166	684	1,370	1,808	2,236	7,285
2	"Salaisimmat tunteet"	22	499	603	806	871	1,664	4,465
3	"Pintaa syvemmältä"	31	707	646	1,213	1,903	1,879	6,379
4	"Rakkauden kirja"	84	4,217	3,845	7,377	9,270	11,176	35,969
5	"Ihan hiljaa"	69	2,915	2,874	5,281	4,584	8,019	23,742
6	"Niin kaunis on taivas"	96	9,659	8,130	14,925	16,760	18,637	67,907
7	"Toukokuu"	65	2,943	3,475	6,553	6,152	10,427	29,615
8	"Keinuta mua"	20	1,260	1,177	2,793	2,512	4,837	12,599
9	"Auringonkukka"	38	768	660	1,949	1,413	2,408	7,236
10	"Elämän tivoli"	62	2,505	2,530	6,236	4,967	7,537	23,837

== At Eurovision ==
In 1996, all nations with the exceptions of the host country were required to qualify from an audio qualifying round, held on 20 and 21 March 1996, in order to compete for the Eurovision Song Contest; the top twenty-two countries from the qualifying round progress to the contest. During a special allocation draw which determined the running order of the final on 22 March 1996, Finland was announced as having finished in the top 22 and subsequently qualifying for the contest. It was later revealed that Finland placed twenty-second in the qualifying round, receiving a total of 26 points. Following the draw, Finland was set to perform in position 18, following the entry from Ireland and before the entry from Iceland. Jasmine was accompanied by Pekka Kuorikoski, Hanna-Riikka Siitonen and Riikka Väyrynen as backing vocalists, and Jari Nieminen and Erkki Salmi as guitarists. The Finnish conductor at the contest was Olli Ahvenlahti, and Finland finished in twenty-third (last) place with 9 points. This was the eighth time Finland finished in last place at the Eurovision Song Contest.

Jasmine's appearance on stage with unstyled hair and no make-up (in contrast to her groomed appearance at the national final) caused considerable puzzled comment – she would subsequently explain that she had strongly disliked the results of the Norwegian hairstyling and make-up artists endeavours, and at the last minute had decided to wash out her hair and remove the make-up, but had no time to start again herself so had no choice but to appear on stage au naturel.

The final was televised in Finland on Yle TV1 with commentary by Erkki Pohjanheimo, Sanna Kojo and Minna Pentti as well as via radio with commentary by Iris Mattila and Pasi Hiihtola on Yle Radio Suomi. Yle appointed Solveig Herlin as its spokesperson to announced the Finnish votes during the final.

=== Voting ===
Below is a breakdown of points awarded to Finland and awarded by Finland in the qualifying round and the final. The nation awarded its 12 points to Sweden in the qualifying round and to Estonia in the final. Among the members of the Finnish jury in the final was singer and musician Maarit Hurmerinta.

==== Qualifying round ====
Points awarded to Finland (qualifying round)
Score	Country
12 points	
10 points	
8 points	Greece
7 points	Iceland
6 points	Switzerland
5 points	Israel
4 points	
3 points	
2 points	
1 point	

Points awarded by Finland (qualifying round)
Score	Country
12 points	Sweden
10 points	Ireland
8 points	Estonia
7 points	United Kingdom
6 points	Turkey
5 points	Iceland
4 points	Belgium
3 points	France
2 points	Austria
1 point	Bosnia and Herzegovina

==== Final ====
Points awarded to Finland (final)
Score	Country
12 points	
10 points	
8 points	
7 points	Iceland
6 points	
5 points	
4 points	
3 points	
2 points	Norway
1 point	

Points awarded by Finland (final)
Score	Country
12 points	Estonia
10 points	Ireland
8 points	Sweden
7 points	Norway
6 points	Cyprus
5 points	Turkey
4 points	Switzerland
3 points	Portugal
2 points	France
1 point	Bosnia and Herzegovina
