= Gogoyoko =

gogoyoko
- Launch date: October 1, 2009
- Discontinued: yes
- Platform(s): MP3s downloadable in any platform, streaming on web browsers
- Status: Discontinued (May 2014), defunct (May 2015)
- Pricing model: streaming / on demand
- Availability: World
- Website: www.gogoyoko.com

gogoyoko.com was an online music store and social networking music website where artists could sell directly to their fans. The site offered free streaming of all tracks, which were subsidized with advertisements in the music store. The focus of the site was on independent music both from independent artists and labels and distributors working in the independent music sector. The aim of the site was to have artists paid fairly for the sale and distribution their music on the Internet, without having to go through a record label or digital aggregators.

Gogoyoko was known as a "forward-thinking" company due to their focus on artists' rights and the concept of "Fair Play in Music", which was term that gogoyoko used to describe its business model and as a general slogan for its activities in organizing concerts for charity and to promote grassroots musical movements. gogoyoko partnered with other companies with a focus on artists' rights and fair business models in the music industry.

== History ==
Gogoyoko was founded in Reykjavík, Iceland, in December 2007 by musicians Haukur Magnússon and Pétur Úlfur Einarsson. Reynir Harðarson, one of the founders of CCP Games and the original art director of the massively multiplayer online game Eve Online, was also a founding member of the company and one of its owners. Their headquarters were located in the downtown Reykjavík area.

On November 15, 2008, gogoyoko launched its Alpha test mode. On May 1, 2009, it launched its beta version. The Beta version became open for everybody in Iceland, where the company was based. On October 1, 2009, the site launched in Scandinavia. For those located outside of Iceland and Scandinavia an invitation to the page was needed.

In 2013, the financial problems the company had been suffering from culminated in the entire staff being laid off and changes in management. Eventually, the service shut down. Its website displayed a message stating that it was "temporarily closed" until as late as May 2015, and was unreachable in December 2016.

== Fair Play ==
Gogoyoko claimed to provide artists and record labels with a greater control of their work in the digital age and a "ground-breaking revenue split" when selling their digital music online. A 10% transaction cost was charged by the company for music sales of downloaded music and the artists received the rest of the revenue from sales after applicable sales taxes and royalties are paid by gogoyoko. The company also shared 40% of advertisement revenues made from their website with artists and copyright holders of the music, which was based pro rata on how much each artist (or label) streamed on the site.

gogoyoko used the slogan "Fair play in music" and that it was "made by artists for artists". gogoyoko was not the only formation in the music scene to use the term "fair play". The Featured Artists' Coalition, whose members include Radiohead, Kate Nash, Iron Maiden and Kaiser Chiefs, has issued a whole campaign based on the "fair play" concept.

"We want all artists to have more control of their music and a much fairer share of the profits it generates in the digital age. We speak with one voice to help artists strike a new bargain with record companies, digital distributors and others, and are campaigning for specific changes."

== Music shop ==
Artists and record labels were able to sell their music on gogoyoko through a customized music store and a widget player that could be embedded to other websites, such as a blog. Artists and labels decided the price of songs and albums, although they were not able to give songs away for free due to Icelandic copyright law. Artists and labels were able to monitor sales and streams of their music in real time a music manager tool on the site. Payout to artists and labels was made every three months by bank transfer.

The music catalog that was available on the gogoyoko site was a combination of music uploaded by individuals and music from large independent distributors, such as Phonofile, Paradise Distribution, AWAL and Kudos Digital.

== Social networking ==
Apart from being a music store, gogoyoko was also a social network platform where music fans, music professionals, artists and record labels could make an online profile and interact, similar to MySpace but with a focus only on music. Users were able to rate and review albums in the store, which made that content more visible to other users through the site's recommendation engine. The focus of the site on independent and grassroots music movements meant that the recommendations that the site made to users were substantially less mainstream than those made on other sites that sell music like Amazon MP3 and iTunes. Users could also "scrobble" their listening history to Last.fm.

According to the website, users could discover new music and dig "deep into music based on your taste, genres, countries, release dates etc. and find music shows in their hometown or elsewhere. The site was founded in Iceland and had a very high representation of the independent and underground music of that country and other Nordic countries.

== Charity ==
gogoyoko pledged to donate 10% of all advertisement revenues to charity and environmental organizations. Artists and record labels could also choose to donate a portion of their earnings to the gogoyoko's partner charities. Other registered users and browsers were able to donate directly through the site.

gogoyoko was partnered with five major charities: UNICEF (Iceland), Médecins Sans Frontières, Refugees United, Witness, and the Icelandic Spinal Cord Institute. As part of their involvement with the grassroots movement in Iceland, they also organized concerts with up-and-coming artists and for special charity project. Their partnership with UNICEF (Iceland) and an Icelandic music venue raised 250.000 Icelandic kronur (approximately US$2100) in January 2010 for the Haitian Relief Fund.
