= REFUNITE =

Danish non-profit organization

- Formation: 2008
- Founders: Christopher Mikkelsen; David Mikkelsen
- Type: Nonprofit
- Purpose: Humanitarian
- Location: Kampala, Uganda, Copenhagen, Denmark, and San Francisco, US
- Website: refunite.org

REFUNITE, short for Refugees United, is a Danish non-profit organization founded in 2008 by David and Christopher Mikkelsen. The organization uses online and mobile solutions to facilitate family reunification of refugees and internally displaced persons (IDPs).

REFUNITE works through partnerships with individuals, organizations, corporations, and humanitarian agencies. Its headquarters is in Copenhagen, Denmark, with the main technology development lab and operations being based in Kampala, Uganda.

== History ==
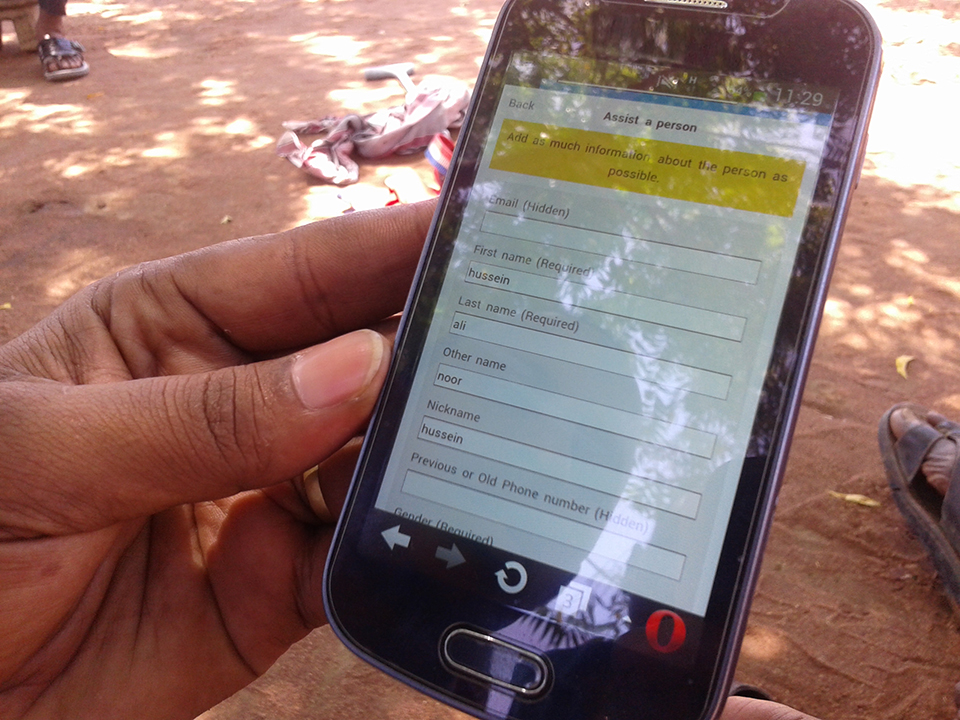
REFUNITE Outreach Volunteer helping a beneficiary register via mobile phone

In 2008, REFUNITE was established by David and Christopher Mikkelsen, Danish siblings, inspired by their own experience attempting to reunite a young Afghan refugee with his family. During their search, they realized that current family tracing programs lacked efficient cross-border technology and collaboration, in addition to a lot of paper work.

They worked to develop a global, centralized, and free platform that would allow refugees and other internally displaced persons (IDPs) to search for and reconnect with their missing families and loved ones. The organization provides the family reconnection service, allowing its users to conduct the actual search.

== Service ==
Out of the 68 million forcibly displaced people worldwide, many do not have access to the Internet and have very basic and simple mobile phones. REFUNITE focuses, through various touch points, on making its service available to as many users as possible.

REFUNITE has worked with Ericsson and mobile network operators to provide SMS messaging to its users free of charge. So far, over 1 million people have registered on the REFUNITE platform.

The family reconnection platform can be accessed through the official website. The search tool is available online in English, Swahili, Somali, Arabic, French, Congolese Swahili, Hindi, Urdu, Pashto, Kurdish, Dari, and Tagalog.

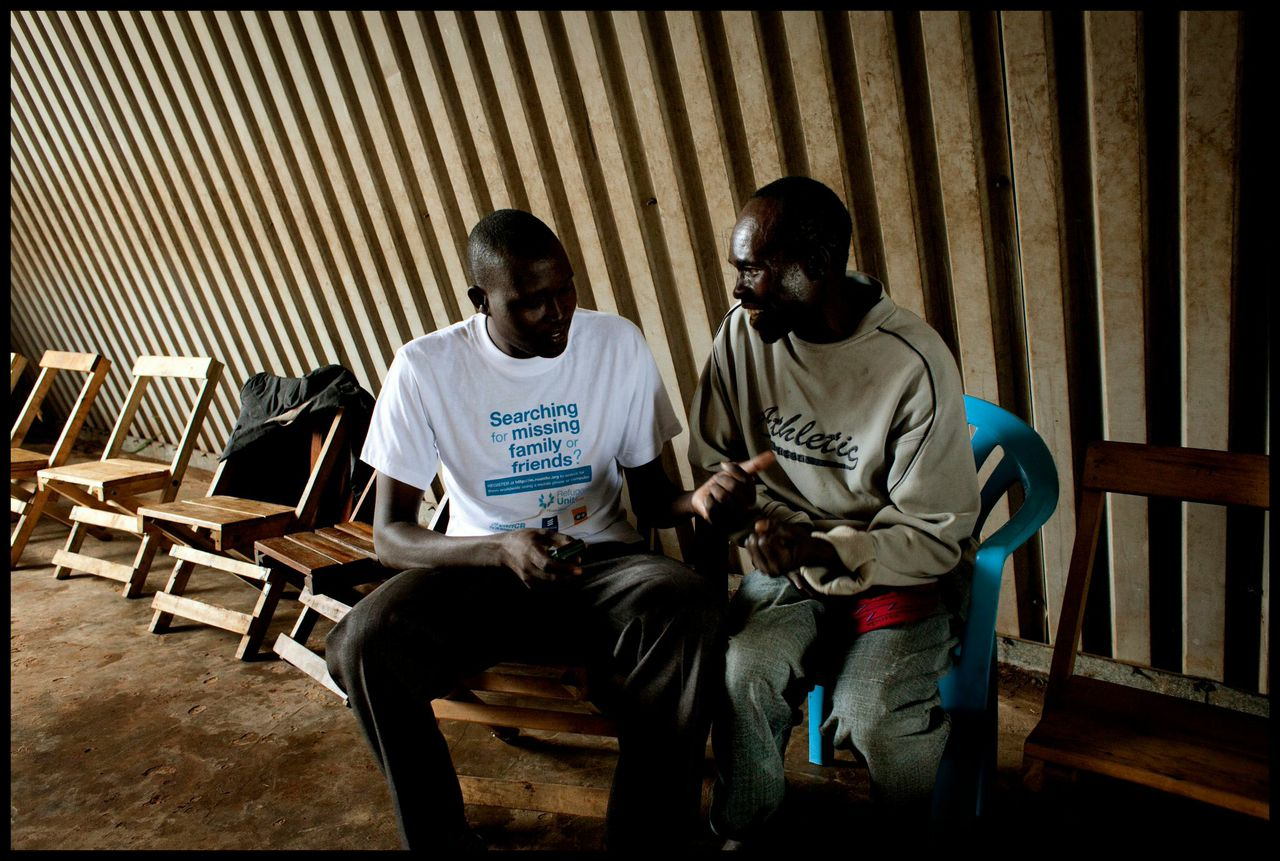
REFUNITE's Outreach Volunteers help beneficiaries register, search, and even share their reconnection story with the organization.

REFUNITE works with outreach volunteers in the Kakuma refugee camp in Kenya. The organization has also worked with the United Nations High Commissioner for Refugees (UNHCR) and the International Rescue Committee (IRC), operating in camps to train local refugees on REFUNITE's technology, so these refugees can help others sign up.

== Awards ==
- 2017 Social Entrepreneurs of The Year: World Economic Forum, Schwab Foundation for Social Entrepreneurship
- 2016 25 Most Daring: Condé Nast, Vanity Fair and WIRED
- 2013 Prix Ars Electronica: Award of Distinction in the category Digital Communities
- 2013 Lovie Award: Lost and Found - The Story of Refugees United
- 2012 Webby Award Winner: Lost and Found - The Story of Refugees United
- 2011 PopTech: Social Innovation Fellows
- 2008 3 Mobile Pioneer Award

=== Corporate partners ===
Mobile network operators enable the organization to communicate directly with refugees and send text messages to their phones. REFUNITE works with Ericsson Facebook, Safaricom in Kenya, Vodacom DRC in the Democratic Republic of the Congo, Telesom in Somaliland, Avea in Turkey, Asiacell in Iraq, and Zain Group in Jordan and South Sudan.

=== Funders ===
REFUNITE's main funders include the H&M Foundation, the Swedish Postkod Foundation and the IKEA Foundation. They have also been funded by Omidyar Network, Maersk Foundation, Danfoss Foundation, LEGO Foundation, SAP and many others.
