= Úlfur Hansson =

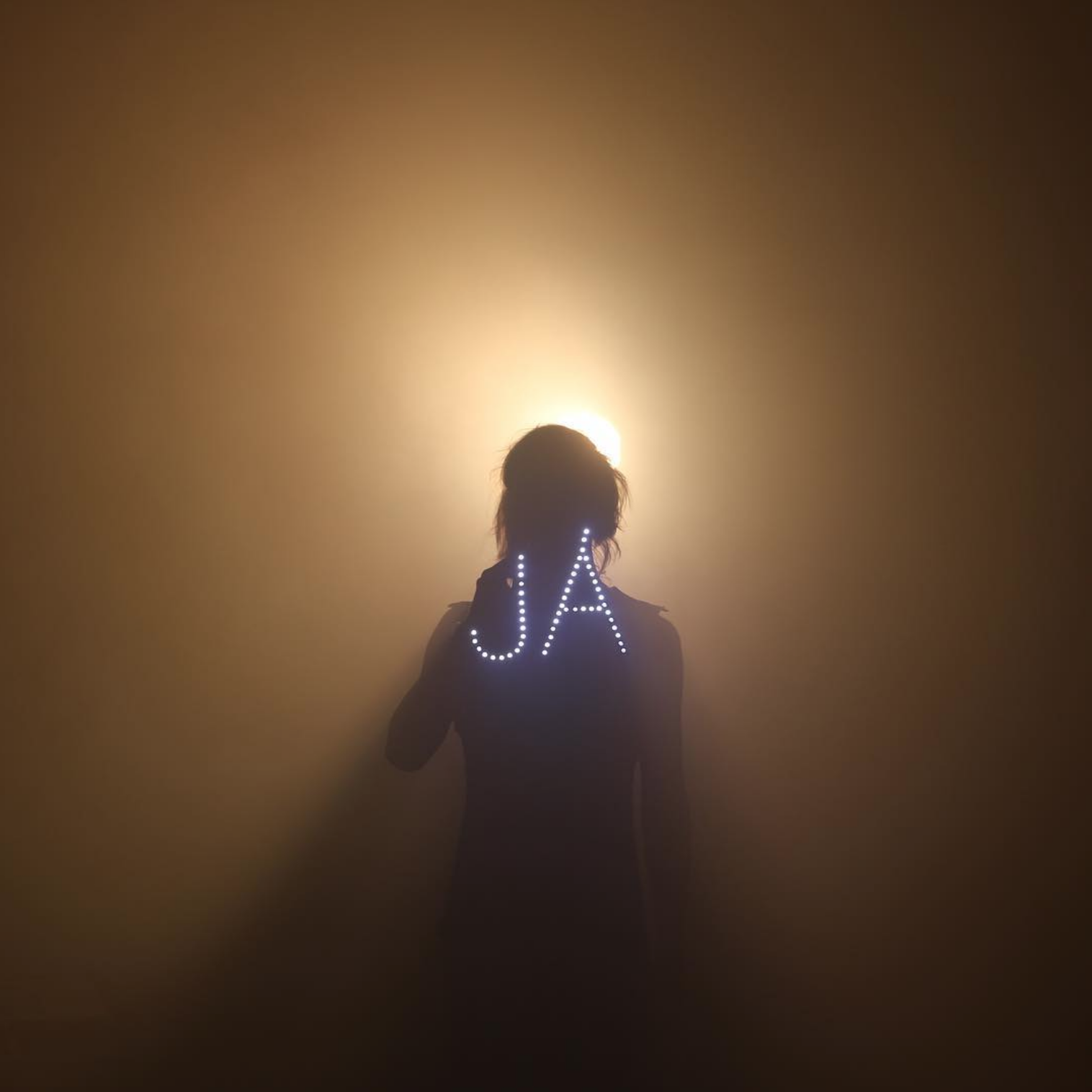
- Úlfur performing live in 2015

Background information
- Born: 30 March 1988 (age 37)
- Origin: Iceland
- Genres: Avant-rock, ambient, contemporary classical
- Instruments: Guitar, bass, vocals, supercollider, segulharpa
- Years active: 2007–present
- Labels: Western Vinyl, Figureight, After Hours
- Website: ulfurhansson.com

Úlfur Hansson (born 30 March 1988) is an Icelandic songwriter, electronic musician and composer. He is also an engineer and has designed and built his own musical instruments. Some of his works have been written for classical ensembles, such as the Iceland Symphony Orchestra, the Orchestre philharmonique de Radio France, and the Kronos Quartet. In 2013 he was named Young Composer of the Year at the International Rostrum of Composers.

== Style ==
Úlfur's music is characterized by dense string arrangements and modal counterpoint. Úlfur's music also incorporates microtonalism to a varying degree, with some of his works being written entirely for custom tuning arrangements. His piece for large orchestra Interwoven was written for all 38 independent string voices of the Iceland Symphony Orchestra. Weightlessness is another example of microtonalism in his work, which utilized 4096 custom-tuned organ pipes in a church organ.

== Instrument design ==
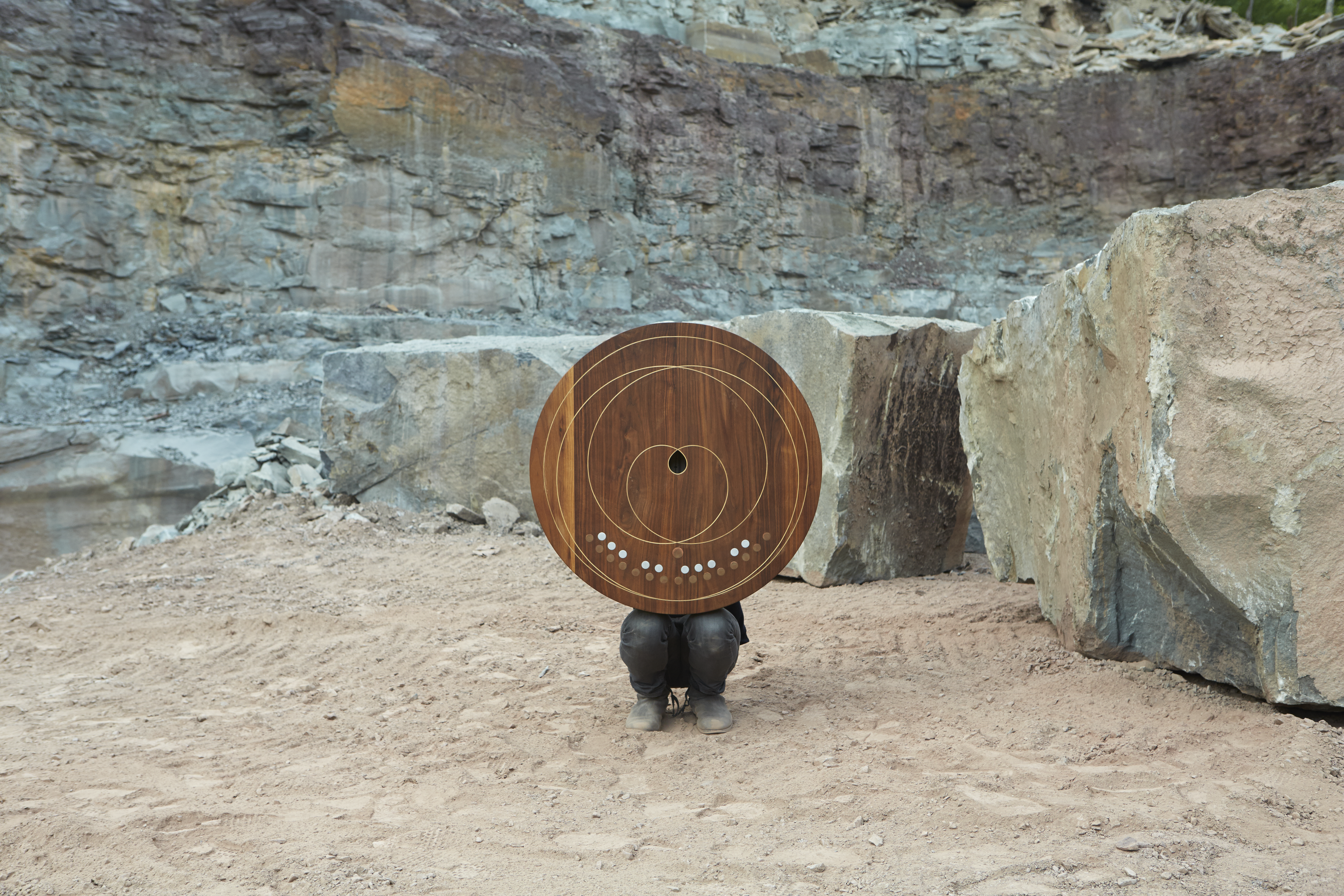
Úlfur's electro-magnetic harp, the Segulharpa

Úlfur has designed a number of custom electronic instruments which he uses in his compositions. In 2018 he revealed his Segulharpa, a 25-string electromagnetic harp that uses electromagnetic actuation circuitry to produce its tone. The instrument is either played by touching the capacitive metal sensor keys on the front panel, or programming the instrument using MIDI.

The development of the instrument was partially funded by the Icelandic Centre for Research.

== Discography ==
=== Sweaty Psalms (2008) ===
1. "Ljósvaki"
2. "Sweaty Psalms"
3. "Sundance"
4. "Giants"
5. "Langoliers"
6. "Mardi Gras"
7. "Common Wealth"
8. "Panacea"
9. "Wookiee"
10. "BLCK"
11. "Vultures"

=== White Mountain (2013) ===
1. "Evoke Ewok"
2. "So Very Strange"
3. "Black Shore"
4. "Heaven in a Wildflower"
5. "White Mountain"
6. "Knoll of Juniper"
7. "Molasses"

=== Arborescence (2017) ===
1. "Arborescence"
2. "Tómið Titrar"
3. "Rhinoceros"
4. "Fovea"
5. "Serpentine"
6. "Weightlessness"
7. "Vakandi"

'Arborescence' was recorded and produced at the Figure Eight Recording studio in Brooklyn, NYC. The title track was originally written for Orchestre philharmonique de Radio France.

Arborescence was produced by Randall Dunn (Sunn O))), Earth (American band), Marissa Nadler, etc.

== Selected orchestral and chamber works ==
=== Arborescence (2017) ===
Orchestral piece written for microtonal string orchestra by commission from conductor Daníel Bjarnason, premiered by the Iceland Symphony Orchestra at the Dark Music Days Festival in 2017.

=== Weightlessness (2016) ===
Music written for the Klais Orgelbau orchestral organ in the Hallgrímskirkja cathedral in Reykjavík, Iceland. The organ was previously prepared by the composer to allow for microtonal tuning of each individual pipe. Weightlessness was premiered at the Dark Music Days Festival in 2016, and later released as part of the composers solo album Arborescence in 2017.

=== Innstirni (2016) ===
Solo piano piece written by commission from pianist Edda Erlendsdóttir. Premiered at the Dark Music Days Festival in 2016.

=== Interwoven (2015) ===
Orchestral piece written for microtonal string orchestra by commission from Israeli conductor Ilan Volkov, woodwinds and percussion. Premiered by the Iceland Symphony Orchestra at the Tectonics Festival in 2015.

=== Þýð (2014) ===
String trio written by commission from Icelandic Baroque music group 'Nordic Affect'. Premiered at The Museum of Water in Iceland, 2014.
