= Edea (band) =

Finnish musical group

Edea is a Finnish musical group. The Edea's song lyrics are written in an older form of the Finnish language and speak of old traditions as well. The mysterious runic symbols inscribed on the bows of Viking boats, door posts, drinking vessels, and amulets as well as the Finnish composer Sibelius are the source of Edea's music. Edea competed in the Eurovision Song Contest 1998 with their song, Aava.

Alexi Ahoniemi plays keyboard and saxophone. He has written lyrics, composed, and arranged for numerous groups.

The ensemble also includes Tommy Mansikka-Aho, who plays ethnic wind instruments, and percussionists Samuli Kosminen and Ethiopian-born Abdissa Assefa, who provide underlying harmonies.

== Members ==
=== Marika Krook ===
Marika Krook (born 27 October 1972 in Stockholm, Sweden) is Edea's figurehead and soprano performer; she is a well-known Finnish actress, singer, and dancer. She started her classical music studies at age 15 and made her debut at the Vaasa Opera in 1988. In 1992, she won the International Opera Song Contest in Tallinn and sang the principal role of Maria in The Sound Of Music in summer theatre. She is currently studying opera singing at the Sibelius Academy.

Krook won the international opera singing contest in Tallinn in 1992. She has starred in many musicals at Helsinki Svenska Teatern and also in a Claes Olsson movie Amazing Women by the Sea, based on a book by Monika Fagerholm.

=== Tommy Mansikka-Aho ===
Tommy Mansikka-Aho (didgeridoo, jaw harp, guitar, jaffa bottle) is a Finnish musician, active in folk music and popular music. He is a former member of the folk music group Gjallarhorn.

=== Samuli Kosminen ===
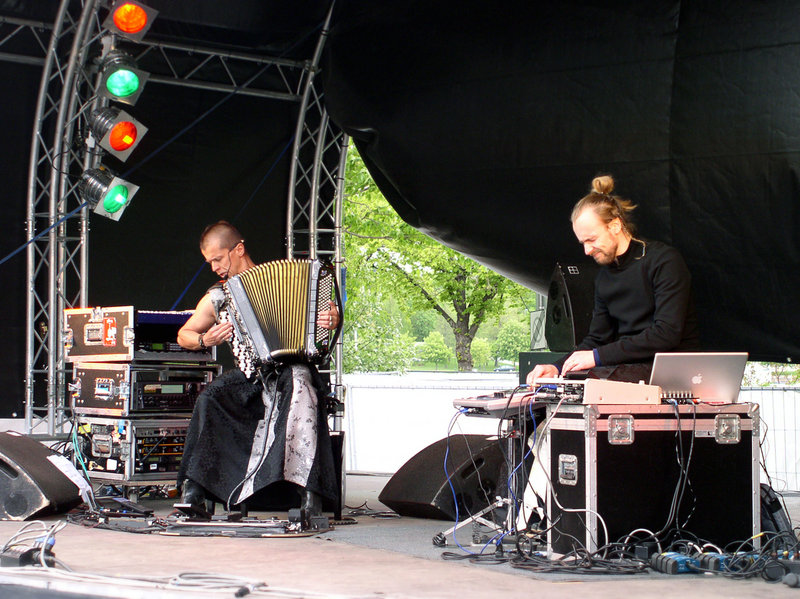
Kimmo Pohjonen Kluster (Kimmo Pohjonen and Samuli Kosminen)

Samuli Kosminen (born 1974 in Klaukkala, Finland) is a Finnish percussionist. As a member of the group Edea, he represented Finland in the Eurovision Song Contest 1998. As a member of Kimmo Pohjonen Kluster he has sampled the accordion played by Kimmo Pohjonen. He is also a member of Icelandic band múm. He studied at the Oulunkylä Pop-Jazz Conservatory. "Kosminen" is a Finnish adjective meaning "cosmic". He currently plays in Björk's Utopia touring band.

=== Other members ===
- Alexi Ahoniemi - keyboards, flute, soprano sax, vocals
- Abdissa Asifa - percussion

== Releases ==
- Edea (1998)
- "Aava" (1998, single)

Preceded by Jasmine with Niin kaunis on taivas	Finland in the Eurovision Song Contest; 1998	Succeeded by Nina Åström with A Little Bit
