= Múm =

Icelandic indietronica band

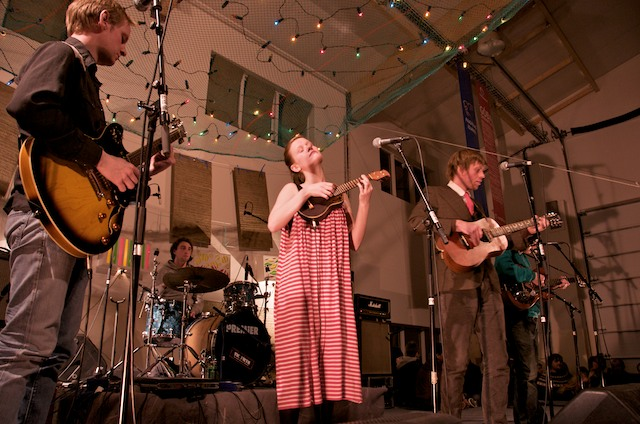
- Múm performing at the Aldrei fór ég suður festival in Ísafjörður, 2009

Background information
- Origin: Iceland
- Genres: Indietronica; folktronica; experimental pop; art pop; dream pop; ambient pop; glitch pop; shoegaze; post-rock; musique concrète; lo-fi
- Years active: 1997–present
- Label: FatCat
- Members: Gunnar Örn Tynes; Örvar Þóreyjarson Smárason; Gyða Valtýsdóttir; Samuli Kosminen; Róberta Andersen; Sigurlaug Gísladóttir
- Past members: Kristín Anna Valtýsdóttir; Hildur Guðnadóttir; Ólöf Arnalds; Eiríkur Orri Olafsson
- Website: mum.is

Múm (stylized in lowercase; Icelandic pronunciation: [muːm]) is an Icelandic indietronica band whose music is characterized by soft vocals, electronic glitch beats and effects, and a variety of traditional and unconventional instruments.

== History ==
The band was formed in 1997 by original members Gunnar Örn Tynes and Örvar Þóreyjarson Smárason, who were joined by twin sisters Gyða and Kristín Anna Valtýsdóttir. According to Kristín, the band's name was not intended to mean anything. Gyða left the band to return to her studies after the release of Finally We Are No One. In early 2006, Kristín also left the band, although it was not officially announced until 23 November of that year. With only Tynes and Smárason remaining in the group, a large group of new musicians were brought on board: guitarist/vocalist/violinist Ólöf Arnalds, trumpet/keyboard player Eiríkur Orri Ólafsson, vocalist/cellist Hildur Guðnadóttir, percussionist Samuli Kosminen, and multi-instrumentalist/vocalist Mr. Silla. The new collective of musicians recorded their fourth album during 2006; Go Go Smear the Poison Ivy was released on 24 September 2007.

Múm toured the East Coast of the US with German musician Volker "Hauschka" Bertelmann In November 2007. They returned in Spring 2008 with the same set list. Both tours included songs from the album, Go, Go Smear the Poison Ivy.

On 27 August 2008, they announced on their official website that "múm is quietly but surely [working on] their new album. No release date has been etched in stone, but every day will bring it closer." Múm also released several pictures of themselves during the recording process on their MySpace page.

During a 22 May 2009 concert in Burgos, Spain, Múm played songs from their newest album Sing Along to Songs You Don't Know. The album, recorded in Finland, Estonia, and Iceland, was released as a download through Gogoyoko on 17 August 2009, and on CD on 24 August 2009.

In December 2011, Múm released an EP called Gleðileg Jól (Merry Christmas in Icelandic) with traditional Icelandic Christmas songs. There are two songs plus one extra track.

On 1 June 2012, Múm released a compilation titled Early Birds, featuring 15 tracks recorded between 1998 and 2000. On 9 February 2013, a collaboration of theirs with Kylie Minogue called "Whistle" surfaced on SoundCloud.

Múm released their sixth album Smilewound in September, 2013 on CD, vinyl and digital download. On 7 September, it was released on cassette for Cassette Store Day.

In 2019, Morr Music celebrated the 20th anniversary of Múm's debut album, Yesterday Was Dramatic – Today Is OK, by rereleasing it. Múm toured around Europe and China following this rerelease, and also announced a US tour that was to take place in March and April 2020.

In June 2025, Múm announced their seventh studio album, History of Silence, which was released on September 19th, 2025. It was supported by the release of the singles "Mild at Heart", "Only Songbirds Have a Sweet Tooth" and "Kill the Light".

== Discography ==
=== Albums ===
- Yesterday Was Dramatic – Today Is OK (TMT, 1999; reissue Morr Music, 2005)
- Finally We Are No One (FatCat, 2002)
- Loksins erum við engin (Smekkleysa, 2002) – the Icelandic version of "Finally We Are No One"
- Summer Make Good (FatCat, 2004)
- Go Go Smear the Poison Ivy (FatCat, 2007)
- Sing Along to Songs You Don't Know (Morr Music, 2009)
- Smilewound (Morr Music, 2013)
- History of Silence (Morr Music, 2025)

=== Compilations ===
- Blái Hnötturinn (2001) – soundtrack
- Motorlab No. 2 (2001) – three tracks contributed to compilation album by Kitchen Motors
- Please Smile My Noise Bleed (Morr Music, 2001) – three new tracks + remixes
- Remixed (TMT, 2001) – versions of Yesterday Was Dramatic – Today Is Ok
- Fálkar (Smekkleysa, 2002) – contributed "Grasi Vaxin Göng"
- Wicker Park (soundtrack) (Lakeshore, 2004) – contributed "We Have a Map of the Piano"
- Screaming Masterpiece (2005) – appeared in the documentary with the video for "Green Grass of Tunnel" and contributed the same song to the soundtrack
- Friends of the Random Summer (2005) – 3 CD, unofficial release
- Kitchen Motors Family Album/Fjölskyldualbúm Tilraunaeldhússins (Spring 2006) – contributed "Asleep in a Hiding Place"
- Early Birds (Morr Music, June 2012) – 15 rares, lost and unreleased tracks

=== EPs ===
- The Ballað of the Broken Birdie Records (TMT, 2000)
- Dusk Log (FatCat, 2004)
- The Peel Session (FatCat, 2006) (Maida Vale 4 Studio 2002)
- Gleðileg Jól (A Number of Small Things, 2011)
- Mysteries (A Number of Small Things, 2013) 100 copies only
- Menschen am Sonntag – Live in Berlin (Morr Music, 2018)

=== Singles ===
- "Green Grass of Tunnel" (FatCat, 2002)
- "Nightly Cares" (FatCat, 2004)
- "They Made Frogs Smoke 'til They Exploded" (FatCat, 2007)
- "Marmalade Fires" (FatCat, 2007)
- "Prophecies and Reversed Memories" (Morr Music, 2009)
- "Whistle" (Parlophone, 2013)
- "Toothwheels" (Morr Music, 2013)
- "When Girls Collide" (Morr Music, 2013)
- "Mild at Heart" (Morr Music, 2025)
- "Only Songbirds Have a Sweet Tooth" (Morr Music, 2025)
- "Kill the Light" (Morr Music, 2025)
