= Kristín Anna Valtýsdóttir =

Icelandic vocalist (born 1982)

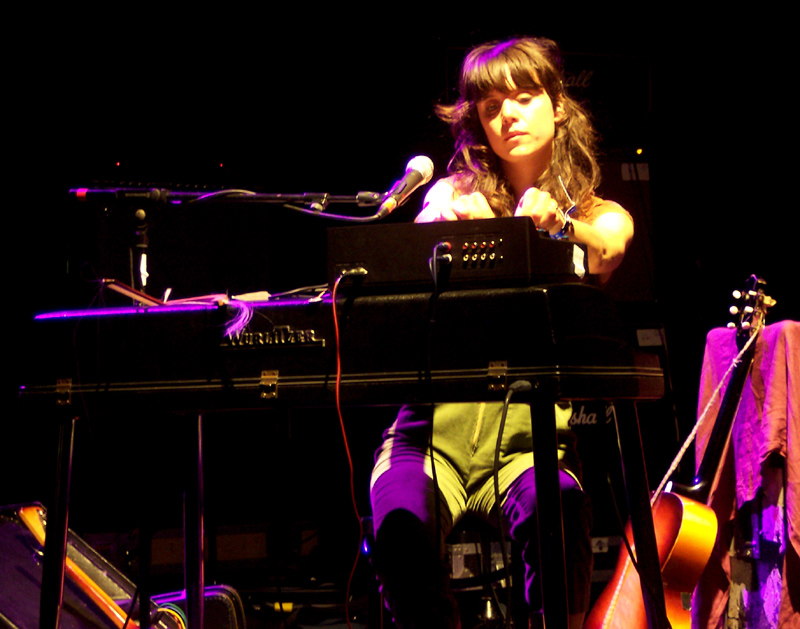

Background information
- Also known as: Kría Brekkan
- Born: Kristín Anna Valtýsdóttir; 5 January 1982 (age 44)
- Instruments: Vocals; Accordion; Piano; Guitar
- Years active: 1997–present

Kristín Anna Valtýsdóttir (born 5 January 1982), also known as Kría Brekkan, is an Icelandic vocalist and classically trained multi-instrumentalist. She is best known as a former frontwoman of múm, and later on for collaborating with former husband David Portner as Avey Tare & Kría Brekkan.

== Biography ==
Kristín Anna was a member of the band múm from 1998 until 2006. During that time the band released three full-length albums, Yesterday Was Dramatic – Today Is OK, Finally We Are No One, and Summer Make Good

She was accordion player in a Balkan folk and post-rock band Stórsveit Nix Noltes in 2003–2010. Those years she also appeared on recordings and performed live with the bands Mice Parade and Slowblow.

In 2005 she recorded the album Feels with Animal Collective. She is credited as "Doctess" on the album. While in the studio, Eyvind Kang heard her piano playing and asked if she'd perform solo at The Stone in New York City.

On April 16, 2006 she performed at The Stone, appearing for the first time as Kría Brekkan, with Avey Tare of Animal Collective, playing grand piano, guitar and singing. The duo performed songs they later released on an LP titled Pullhair Rubeye.

She performed her own songwriting for piano and voice for the first time April 21, 2006 at The Stone in New York under the name Kría Brekkan.

In late 2006, Kristín acknowledged that she had left múm in the beginning of that year, and published an open letter briefly describing her thoughts on the matter.

Kristín Anna appeared on the cover of Belle & Sebastian's 2000 Fold Your Hands Child, You Walk Like a Peasant LP with her twin sister, Gyða.

She recorded and mixed the Black Habit LP by Rings (featuring ex-members of First Nation). She was chosen by Animal Collective to perform at the All Tomorrow's Parties festival that they curated in May 2011. In 2012, Kristín performed in an exhibition by fellow Icelandic artist, Hrafnhildur Arnardottir. In 2014, she performed at ATP Iceland and the Reykjavík Arts Festival.

== Personal life ==
Kristín was married to David Portner (Avey Tare) of Animal Collective from 2006 to 2008.

Her twin sister is Gyða Valtýsdóttir.

== Discography ==
=== as Kristín Anna ===
- Howl double LP (27 November 2015, Bel-Air Glamour Records)
- I Must Be The Devil (5 April 2019, Bel-Air Glamour Records)

=== as Kría Brekkan ===
- Wildering 7" (14 November 2007, After Hours)
- Apotropaíosong Armor Ep (November 2008, self-released)
- Uterus Water 7" (10 January 2010, Paw Tracks)

=== with múm ===
- Yesterday Was Dramatic – Today Is OK (1999 TMT, reissue 2005 Morr Music)
- Finally We Are No One (2002 Fat Cat Records)
- Summer Make Good (2004 Fat Cat Records)

=== with Animal Collective ===
- Feels (credited as "Doctess") (18 October 2005 Fat Cat Records)

=== with Avey Tare ===
- Pullhair Rubeye (24 April 2007, Paw Tracks)

=== with Rings ===
- Black Habit (January 2008)

=== with Stórsveit Nix Noltes ===
- Orkideur Hawai (21 March 2006, Bubblecore)
- Royal Family - Divorce (5 May 2009, Fat Cat Records/Rough Trade)

=== Appearances ===
- Be Good To Earth This Season with Antony Hegarty featured by Reverend Green on Be Good To Earth This Season/Wolfie's Christmas 7" (December 2008, Paw Tracks)
