= Örvar Þóreyjarson Smárason =

Icelandic musician

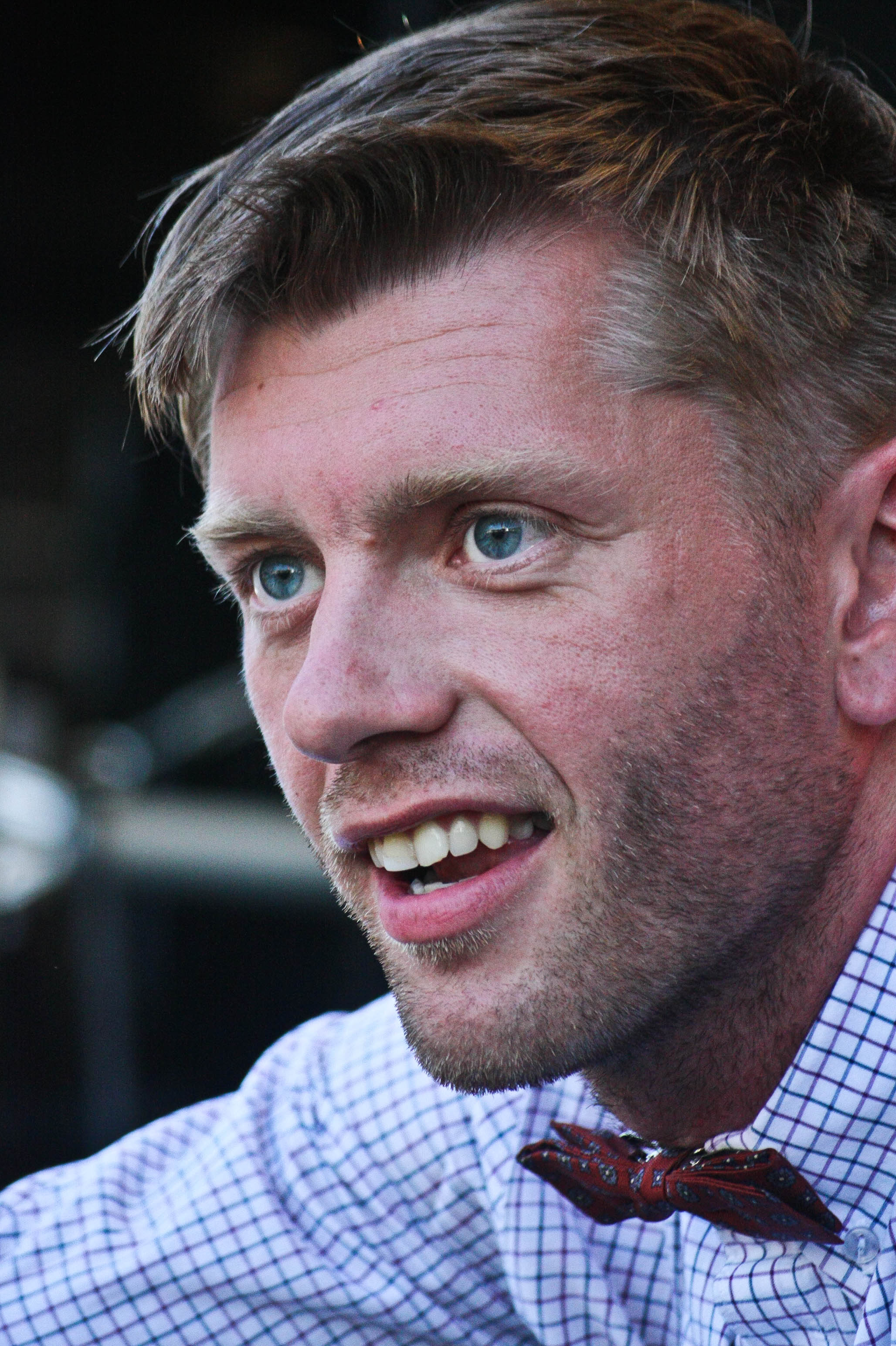
- Örvar in Belfast in 2011

Background information
- Born: 1977 (age 48–49)
- Origin: Iceland
- Genres: Experimental
- Occupations: Musician, poet, author

Örvar Þóreyjarson Smárason (born 1977) is a founding member of Icelandic experimental band múm, and has been a part-time member of other Icelandic bands such as Benni Hemm Hemm, Singapore Sling, Slowblow, Andhéri, Skakkamanage, FM Belfast and Represensitive Man.

In Iceland, Örvar is also known as a poet and author. Gamall þrjótur, nýjir tímar ("Old villain, new times") a book of poetry was published in 2005 as a part of Nýhil's Nordic literature series. It was preceded by the critically acclaimed novella Úfin, strokin ("Ruffled, stroked"), released in 2005 and described as "a detective boy novel updated for modern girls". He studied screenwriting at FAMU in Prague.

== Publications and discography ==
- Úfin, strokin ("Ruffled, stroked") (2005) – novella
- Scapigliata, lisciata (Italian translation of Úfin, Strokin) (Scritturapura, Italy, 2008) – novella
- Gamall þrjótur, nýjir tímar ("Old villain, new times") (Nýhil, 2005) – poetry
- To Fruits Turn the Youth (Afterhours, Japan, 2007) – Illustrations, drawings and poetry
- Team Dreams (Morr Music, 2017) collaborative album of Sin Fang, Sóley and Örvar Smárason
- Light is Liquid (Morr Music, 2018) first solo album
