= Jörmundur Ingi Hansen =

Icelandic neopagan leader (born 1940)

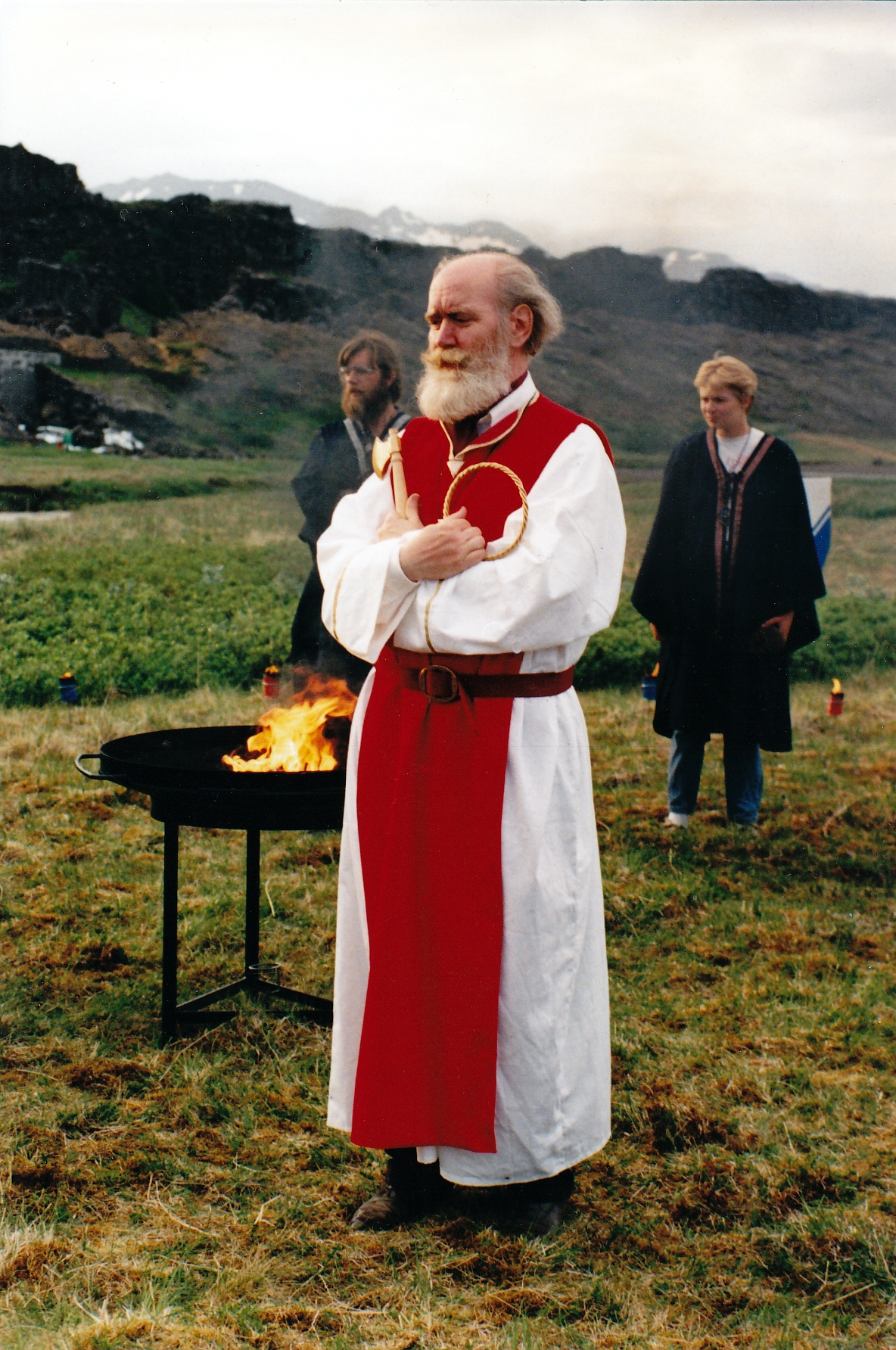
- Jörmundur Ingi Hansen being sworn in as allsherjargoði in 1994
- Born: Jørgen Ingi Hansen; 14 August 1940 (age 86); Reykjavík, Iceland
- Occupation: allsherjargoði

Jörmundur Ingi Hansen (born 14 August 1940) is an Icelandic neopagan leader, designer, businessman and clothing retailer. Trained as a sculptor and known as a prominent member of Reykjavík's hippie scene, he co-founded the Icelandic neopagan organization Ásatrúarfélagið in 1972, co-creating its rituals, liturgy and clothing. From 1994 to 2002, he led the organization, holding the title allsherjargoði; during his time in office, Ásatrúarfélagið experienced significant membership growth, acquired a building in Reykjavík and constructed a pagan burial ground designed by Jörmundur. An internal conflict led to his removal from the position, and in 2004 he left and became the leader of a small splinter group.

In his professional life, Jörmundur has worked making architectural drawings, as a salesman and as a designer. He is interested in men's fashion and sells vintage clothes in Reykjavík.

== Early life and education ==
Born in Reykjavík, Iceland, on 14 August 1940 as Jörgen Ingi Hansen, he changed his Danish first name early on to the Icelandic Jörmundur. His parents were the merchant Jörgen F. F. Hansen (1916–1991), who was of Danish descent and Helga Eiríksdóttir Hansen (1917–2008). He has five younger siblings. After graduating from the trade school Iðnskólinn in Reykjavík in 1957, he went to Copenhagen to study civil engineering and architecture at the Technical University of Denmark, but returned to Iceland after two years. He then studied sculpture under Ásmundur Sveinsson and Ragnar Kjartansson.

As a young man, he was known for his bohemian personality, interested in esotericism and Eastern religions, and one of the most prominent people in Reykjavík's hippie movement. In the 1971 Icelandic parliamentary election he was a candidate for Framboðsflokkurinn, a jocular political party mainly made up of students and musicians, described in Mánudagsblaðið as "the troubled youth of today". From 1975 to 1978, he studied Hungarian, Greek, Sanskrit and Indo-European comparative linguistics at the University of Iceland.

== Icelandic neopaganism ==
According to Jörmundur, he began to practice Old Norse religion in 1955 at 15. He founded a pagan congregation on his own which he named the Reykjavíkurgoðorð (roughly 'Reykjavík chieftaincy'). (Note: Goðorð is a term from the medieval Icelandic Commonwealth, where it was a political and, before Christianization, religious office.) He tried to create a broader pagan organization in the 1950s, but was unable to find interested people before the 1968 student movement had had a cultural impact in Iceland.

=== Ásatrúarfélagið's first decades (1972–1993) ===
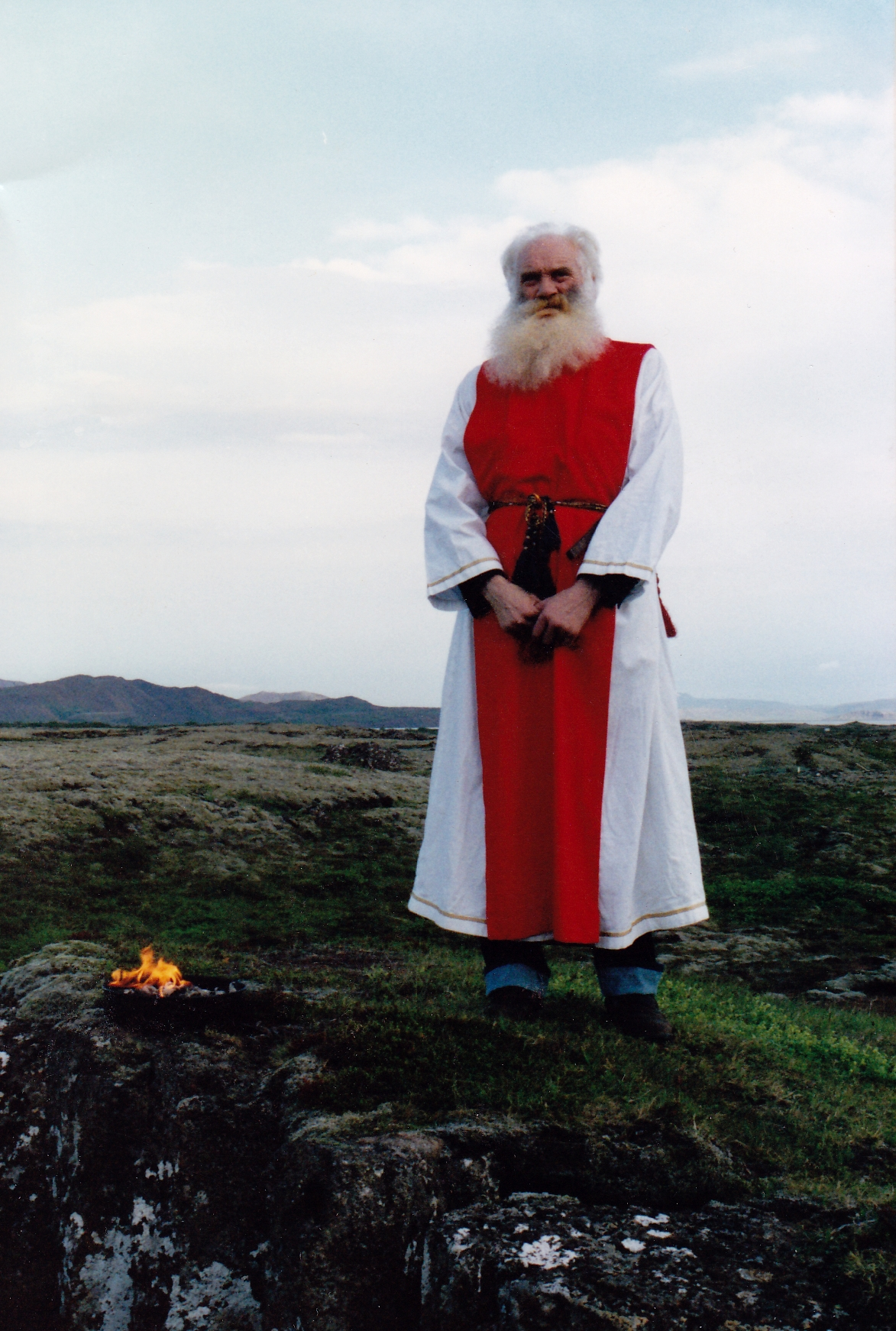
Sveinbjörn Beinteinsson in 1991

Jörmundur contacted the farmer and poet Sveinbjörn Beinteinsson when he heard that Sveinbjörn had also tried to find people for a pagan organization. In 1972, Jörmundur and Sveinbjörn were two of the co-founders of the Icelandic neopagan organization Ásatrúarfélagið. (Note: lit. 'the ása-faith association'; ása- is derived from áss, an archaic word for "god" and associated with Norse mythology.) Together with Sveinbjörn, who was elected as the organization's first leader and given the title allsherjargoði, Jörmundur constructed the organization's rituals and liturgy. He created its clothing and sculpted the god Thor used at the center of the group's cult place. Because of his extroverted personality, he became responsible for much of Ásatrúarfélagið's media representation. The Reykjavíkurgoðorð, originally Jörmundur's personal project, continued to exist and functioned as a local division within Ásatrúarfélagið, with Jörmundur as its leader.

During its first decade of existence, Ásatrúarfélagið had around 70 members. A small faction interested in racial politics left in 1983 to form their own group, and Ásatrúarfélagið remains characterized by a liberal and humanistic form of neopaganism. It is based on the reinvention of traditions and a combination of localism and cosmopolitanism. The traditions at its core are related to Iceland's cultural history, where Old Norse literature and the associated Norse mythology long have been prominent, as well as folkloric beliefs and customs related to beings such as elves, landvættir and huldufólk. The theological views of Ásatrúarfélagið's members may vary and representatives, including Jörmundur, have elaborated their personal views independently.

Jörmundur and other key people in Ásatrúarfélagið's history have been artistically inclined. This has created a strong emphasis on literary, artistic and cultural interests. According to the religious studies scholar Michael Strmiska, this makes Ásatrúarfélagið different from many Norse-derived neopagan organizations in other countries, such as the United States, where more focus has been on the martial and masculine image of the Vikings.

=== Allsherjargoði (1994–2002) ===
After Sveinbjörn's death in 1993, Jörmundur was chosen as the new allsherjargoði in 1994. He was elected with 59, or 61.8% of the votes, against 34 votes, or 36.2%, for Haukur Halldórsson. One vote was blank. Jörmundur represented a faction that wanted to maintain old traditions, whereas Haukur wished to change Ásatrúarfélagið's practices in ways he thought would make them more appealing to contemporary people.

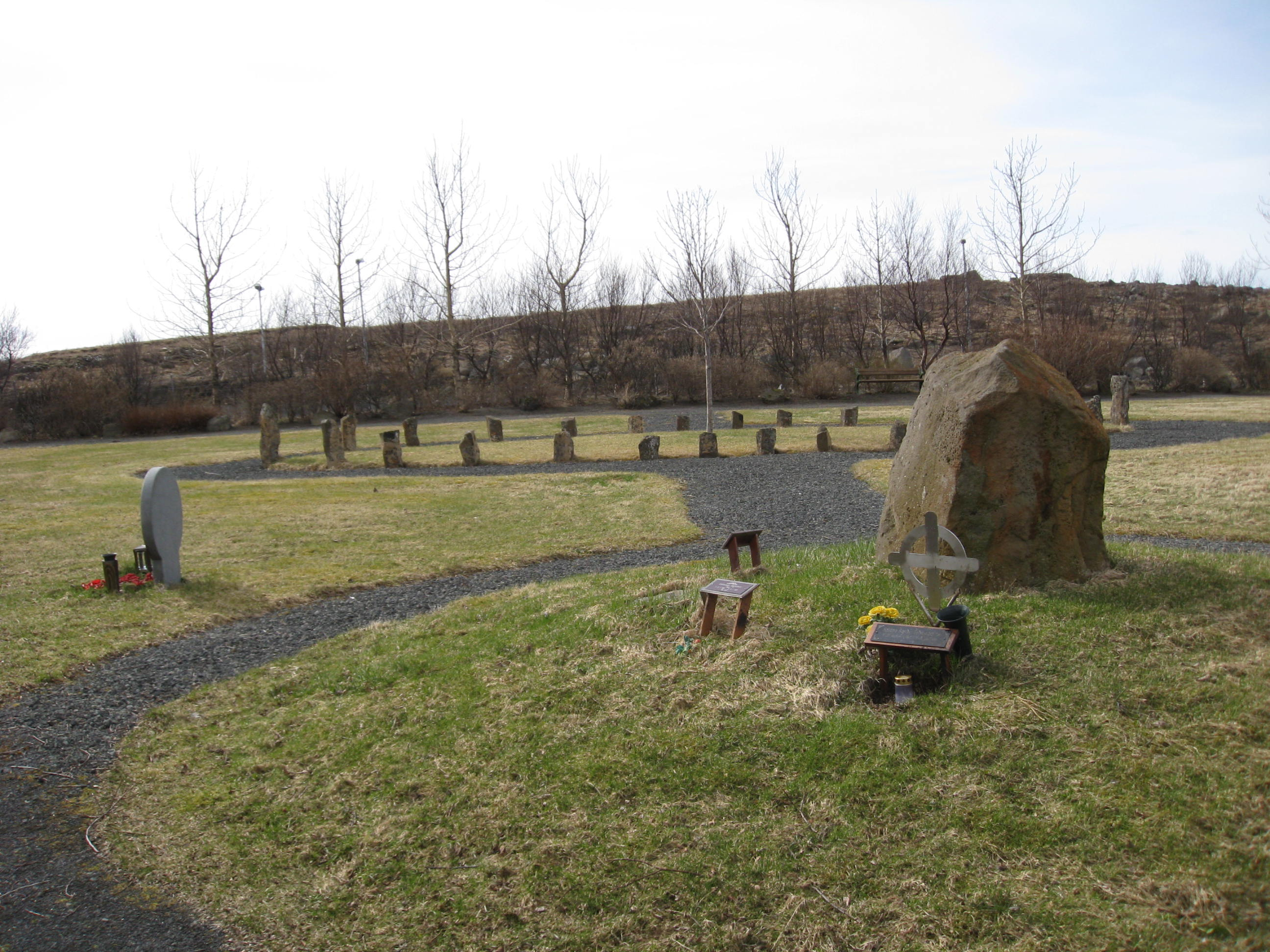
Jörmundur designed the pagan burial ground in Reykjavík.

Increased mainstream acceptance for Ásatrúarfélagið and significant membership growth marked Jörmundur's time as leader. (Note: Ásatrúarfélagið had 172 members in 1994 and 636 members at the end of 2002.) The group acquired a building in Reykjavík, and in 1999 established an official pagan burial ground which Jörmundur designed. The burial ground is part of the cemetery at Gufunes in Reykjavík. At the turn of the millennium, Jörmundur pursued international collaboration between neopagan groups through the World Pagan Congress, an initiative created by the Lithuanian Jonas Trinkūnas. Jörmundur's international visions included the creation of a Pagan Charter and the provision of support in countries that lacked pagan organizations. The World Pagan Congress resulted in the creation of the World Congress of Ethnic Religions (WCER), of which Ásatrúarfélagið was a founding member.

Jörmundur wanted to lead Ásatrúarfélagið the way Sveinbjörn had done, functioning as chairman, cashier, promoter and religious leader, but because of the increased complexity that came with the organization's growth, Ásatrúarfélagið's board of directors began to elect separate officials for some tasks, which led to an internal power struggle. A suspicion that some WCER members had ties to far-right politics, which some of Ásatrúarfélagið's members feared could have a negative impact on their own organization's reputation, (Note: After Jörmundur's time as leader, Ásatrúarfélagið left the WCER (later renamed the European Congress of Ethnic Religions, ECER) and has generally been skeptical of international collaboration.) and a business venture selling Icelandic horses abroad, weakened Jörmundur's internal support. A majority of the board members came to support Jörmundur's dismissal. He was removed from office in 2002 and replaced by the deputy allsherjargoði Jónína Kristín Berg, before Hilmar Örn Hilmarsson, a composer, musician and long-time member of Ásatrúarfélagið, was elected to the position in 2003. Jörmundur initially refused to accept his removal, but he did not want to hurt the organization and endorsed the election of Hilmar.

=== After Ásatrúarfélagið (2004–) ===
In 2004, Jörmundur and a group of loyalists left Ásatrúarfélagið, making the Reykjavíkurgoðorð independent again as a registered religious organization under his leadership. According to Jörmundur, the disagreement between him and Ásatrúarfélagið had much to do with money; other members did not like his approach to financial matters, and he was critical of Ásatrúarfélagið's decision to sell its building in Reykjavík after his removal from office. Jörmundur's independent Reykjavíkurgoðorð is a small, non-political group and had almost 30 members in 2015. It was not actively seeking new members, but was open to anyone who wished to join. Jörmundur retains the rights to perform marriages and burials through the organization.

Jörmundur appears on the 2005 album Red for Fire: An Icelandic Odyssey by the Norwegian heavy metal band Solefald, where he recites from the Eddic poem Lokasenna. He is the subject of the five-minute documentary film Jörmundur (2018), where he discusses his worldview and the concept of being one with the natural world. The film won the award for best Icelandic short film at the 2018 Reykjavík International Film Festival; the jury called it "a beautiful, reverent ode to an interesting subject".

== Religious views ==
An important early influence on Jörmundur's conception of Old Norse religion was the 19th-century scholar Finnur Magnússon. Jörmundur has maintained a great interest in the history of religions and comparative religion, stressing the relationship between old traditions in Iceland and places such as Ossetia and Lithuania.

In 1992, Jörmundur defined his approach to Norse polytheism as choosing to side with the æsir—the gods—whom he views as the constructive forces of the world, against the jötnar—a type of being often in conflict with the gods in the Norse myths—whom he views as the destructive forces. He views the forces of nature to some extent as gods, and as the ones who have shaped the world out of pre-existing matter. He thinks the best way to practice the religion is by "being consistent with oneself, living in harmony with nature, treating it with respect and obeying public order". In a 2008 interview, he said that he thinks much of Norse paganism comes naturally to Icelanders, because it is part of their culture and language. He has associated it with the concept of memes, the immaterial equivalent of genes.

Rather than trying to reconstruct historical liturgy, the rituals of Ásatrúarfélagið have been created through reworkings and experimentation based on older traditions in an attempt to continually renew them. The rituals typically have some relationship to Old Norse literature, using historical terms such as blót and recitings of Old Norse poetry. Within this context, Jörmundur is regarded as someone who favors a strong continuity of traditions and reliance on historical material. Some early members of Ásatrúarfélagið were involved in the mediumistic association Félag Nýalssinna; Jörmundur participated in a few of their sessions, but was not convinced by the results.

== Professional career and other ventures ==
From 1962 to 1966, Jörmundur worked making architectural drawings. After that, he worked as a salesman for his father's company and ran his own small business. He has worked on various design projects for architectural firms and through his own interior design company. After the dissolution of the Soviet Union, he moved to Lithuania where he worked with the export of Icelandic horses, but he moved back to Iceland after the death of Sveinbjörn in 1993 and his appointment as allsherjargoði. Until his retirement he made money importing kitchen appliances from Germany.

Jörmundur has a great interest in men's fashion and runs Fatamarkaður Jörmundar (lit. 'Jörmundur's clothing market'), a vintage clothing business in Reykjavík. He says he does not earn much money from it and views it as a service to help men to dress better, as he does not consider contemporary fashion trends to be good for them. All the clothes he sells have been part of his personal wardrobe. He initially bought and sold clothes at the Kolaportið flea market. In the early 2010s, he opened his own store at Laugavegur, but he left the location due to a lack of people moving in the area. As of 2020, he operated five booths at a bazaar in the shopping mall Kringlan.

== See also ==
- Allsherjargoði and goði, historical Icelandic titles
- Counterculture of the 1960s
