= Gunnhildur Hauksdóttir =

Icelandic artist (born 1972)

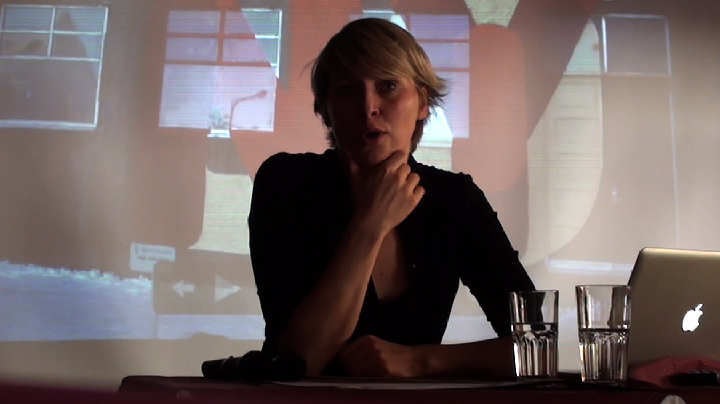
- Gunnhildur Hauksdóttir, 2010
- Born: 1972 (age 53–54); Reykjavik, Iceland
- Education: Sandberg Institute, Amsterdam

Gunnhildur Hauksdóttir (born 1972) is an Icelandic visual artist. Works of art created by Hauksdóttir consist of audio, video, performance such as dance, sculpture, drawing and text.

== Early life and education ==
Hauksdóttir was born in Reykjavik in 1972. She is the daughter of Icelandic artist Haukur Halldórsson and health worker Sigrún Kristjánsdóttir. Hauksdóttir received her BFA from Iceland University of the Arts in 2001. Her MFA is from the Sandberg Institute, Gerrit Rietveld Academie in Amsterdam in 2005 and she is a member of the Dieter Roth Academy. She has lived and worked in Reykjavik and Seydisfjord in Iceland, in Amsterdam, Netherlands and Berlin, Germany. Her son is Matthias Tryggvi Haraldsson, a playwright and founding member of the Icelandic performance art group, Hatari. Her father is a long-time member of the Icelandic neopagan organization Ásatrúarfélagið, which she also joined as an adult.

== Artistic work ==
Gunnhildur Hauksdóttir works with drawing, sculpture, audio, video and performance. Her work entails public participation and cross disciplinary practice, such as her body of works called Borderline Human, Milk River Valley, where she collaborated through the University Art Gallery in Lethbridge in Canada with a team of Scientists from the Barret Henzi Lab. The work consists of an installation with audio work, drawings and dance performance along with providing a platform for interdisciplinary workshops. Some of the works from the Borderline Human project are found in the collection of the Goethe Institute in Copenhagen and the Hess Gallery of the University of Lethbridge. Hauksdóttir consistently works together with Hošek Contemporary art gallery in Berlin, Germany.

Among her other notable works are Five Drawings where she has five singers vocalise drawings for a sculpture transformed into a binaural microphone. Ritualized Disciplinary Practices in Social Life was an exhibition project in four phases. Der Abstand, a cacophony reading which was part of The Silver Lining, a collateral event at the 2015 Venice Biennale organised by the Kunstverein Schichtwechsel and the Liechtenstein Kunstmuseum. Cencus in Skaftfell, Center for Visual Art (IS 2014), Hauksdottir is engaged in a long-term collaboration with author Kristín Ómarsdóttir and the duo have produced works like the Footbath with the Reykjavik Art festival (IS 2002), Stars with the Context Gallery (NI 2011) My Gift, Your Excellency in ASI Art Museum (IS 2011), Audition with the Ace Art Inc (CA 2008). Hauksdottir participated in the D-Series at the Reykjavik Art Museum with her work Cultus Bestiae (IS 2008).

== Exhibitions ==
The first exhibition of Borderline Human, Milk River Valley was at the Terminal Exhibitions in Postwerk in Berlin in 2018. It was also on display as a solo exhibition at the University of Lethbridge in Canada in 2019. Her collective exhibitions include Mirrorriff DRA-Hjalteyri (IS 2010), Howl Donau festival (AU 2010) and Rockabilly Gal w. Kling & Bang (DK 2009).

== Work related to art ==
Gunnhildur Hauksdóttir has served on the board of Safnasafnið, The Icelandic Folk and Outsider Art Museum, Skaftfell, Art Center, and the Living Art Museum in Reykjavik where was head of the board and director for four years until March 2014. She has served on the artistic board of Sequences Art Festival and has been and is involved in numerous publications, lectures, and research on artist initiatives and their impact on culture.

== Yggdrasil Divination Deck ==
Apart from several publications related to contemporary art, Hauksdóttir has authored a guidebook to the Yggdrasil Norse Divination Cards, which she published together with Haukur Halldórsson who illustrated the cards. The deck of cards is based on Norse mythology as told in the Poetic and Prose Edda. The deck was published in 2019 by Llewellyn Books.
