= Hof Ásatrúarfélagsins =

Modern pagan religious building

Hof Ásatrúarfélagsins í Öskjuhlíð
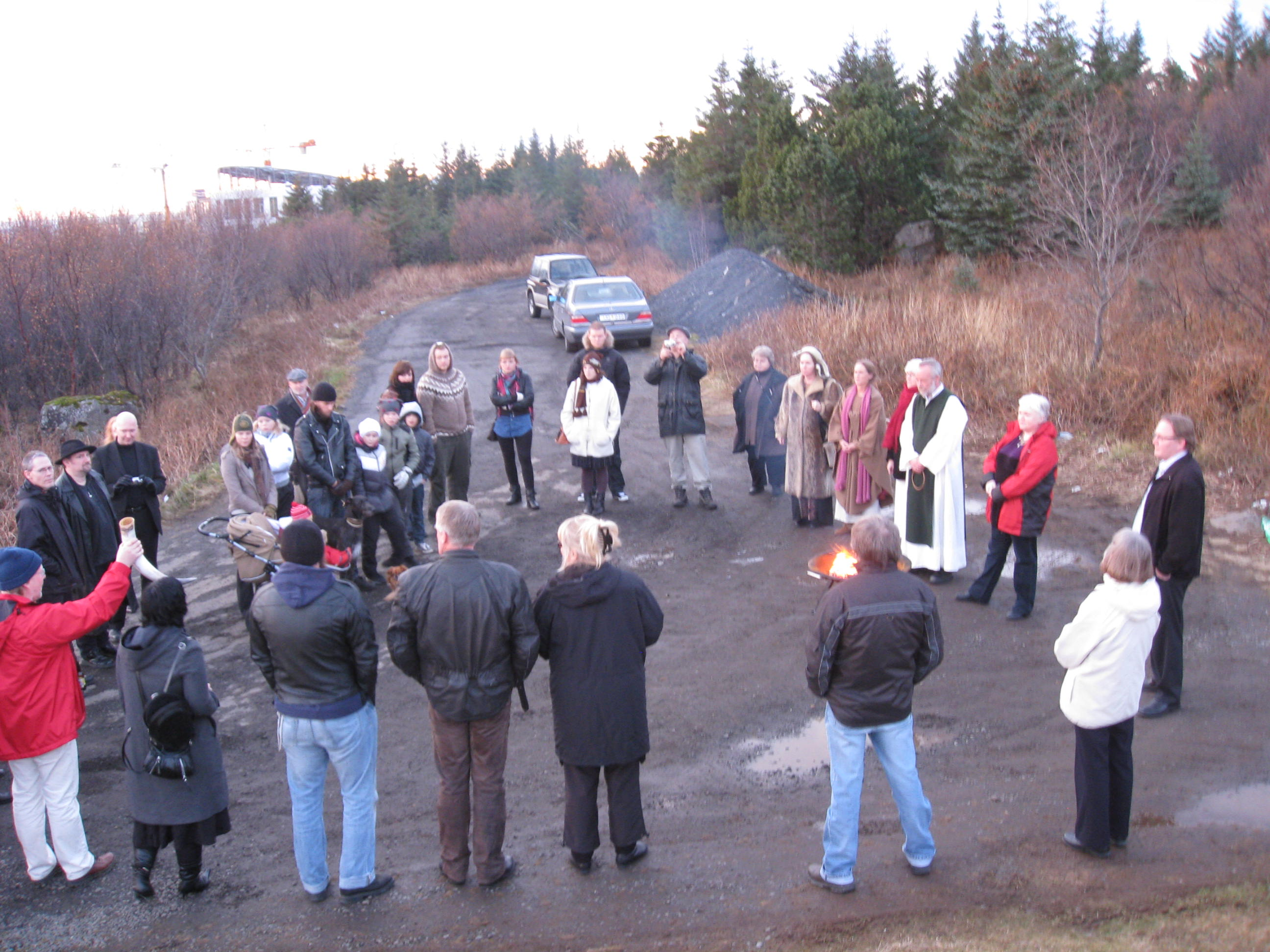
- A ceremony in 2009 at the location of the planned building

General information
- Status: Under construction
- Location: Öskjuhlíð, Reykjavík, Iceland
- Coordinates: 64°7′21.35″N 21°55′18.68″W
- Groundbreaking: 20 March 2015
- Owner: Ásatrúarfélagið

Hof Ásatrúarfélagsins is a religious building under construction in Reykjavík, Iceland. When finished it will be used by the Heathen organization Ásatrúarfélagið for religious ceremonies, concerts, exhibitions and administrative work. It is Iceland's first major hof to the Norse gods since the Viking Age. It is located on the southern slope of the hill Öskjuhlíð, close to Reykjavík University.

The project has been under development since 2005, but has been delayed several times because of the 2008–2011 Icelandic financial crisis and problems with the design. It has been under construction since 2015. As of 2022, the building's office part was operational but the social part was still unfinished.

== History ==
=== Development ===
In 2005, Ásatrúarfélagið decided to sell its house in Reykjavík which it had acquired in 1998. The real-estate value had at this point increased so much that the organization's long-time goal of building a hof in Reykjavík for its activities had become a realistic project. Ásatrúarfélagið originally applied for a plot of land for a religious building in Elliðaárdalur. Reykjavík's mayor Ingibjörg Sólrún Gísladóttir instead suggested a location on the hill Öskjuhlíð, which Ásatrúarfélagið accepted in 2006. However, this plot turned out to be within the safety zone of the Reykjavík Airport, so a new location nearby, on the southern slope of the same hill, was assigned in 2008. Ásatrúarfélagið and its allsherjargoði Hilmar Örn Hilmarsson were especially pleased by the proximity between this location and the Reykjavík University.

The land was donated by the city and the construction funds were provided by Ásatrúarfélagið. On 1 September 2008, five architectural firms submitted their respective proposals for the building's design to Ásatrúarfélagið's building committee. When the building still was on a planning stage, the 2008 Icelandic banking collapse took place, which resulted in substantial financial losses for Ásatrúarfélagið, and the hof project was delayed by several years.

In January 2015, Magnús Jensson's design was revealed. It was reported that construction was soon to begin. The building was reported to have a construction cost of 130 million Icelandic krónas.

=== Construction ===
Construction officially broke ground at the solar eclipse of 20 March 2015. The building was then projected to be finished in the late summer of 2016. However, the complicated design has caused technical problems and further delays. Immediately there were problems with the preparation of the site, which had the effect that actual construction did not begin until 2017. In December 2017 it was expected to be finished by the end of 2018.

In February 2019, Hilmar Örn said that the most optimistic expectation was for the building to be finished in December 2019, although he hoped that parts would be ready for active use already in the autumn that year. He explained that it was the dome that caused problems and that the project had gone severely over its original budget, with the costs now estimated at 270 million krónas. He also revealed that Ásatrúarfélagið had looked at different models for potentially crowdfunding parts of the costs, although stressed that the funders in that case must receive something in return for their money. He explained that it was crucial for the organization's dignity to not take any bank loan.

In June 2019, Hilmar Örn said that the building would be constructed in stages. The office part would become operational first, but even if the crowdfunding campaign was a success, the whole project could take two years to finish. In February 2020, Hilmar Örn expected the dome to be finished in 2022. The projected total cost was 300 million krónas. The deputy allsherjargoði Jóhanna G. Harðardóttir said in July 2021 that construction had proceeded well during the last year and the building should be able to host Ásatrúarfélagið's administrative work in the autumn of 2021. By April 2022, Ásatrúarfélagið had moved into the office part and the social part was close to being finished. In July 2023, Hilmar Örn said there was no hurry to finish the dome and it will be built whenever the organization can afford materials without taking a loan. A plan to buy the steel frame for the dome from China had fallen apart because of the COVID-19 pandemic.

== Architecture and design ==
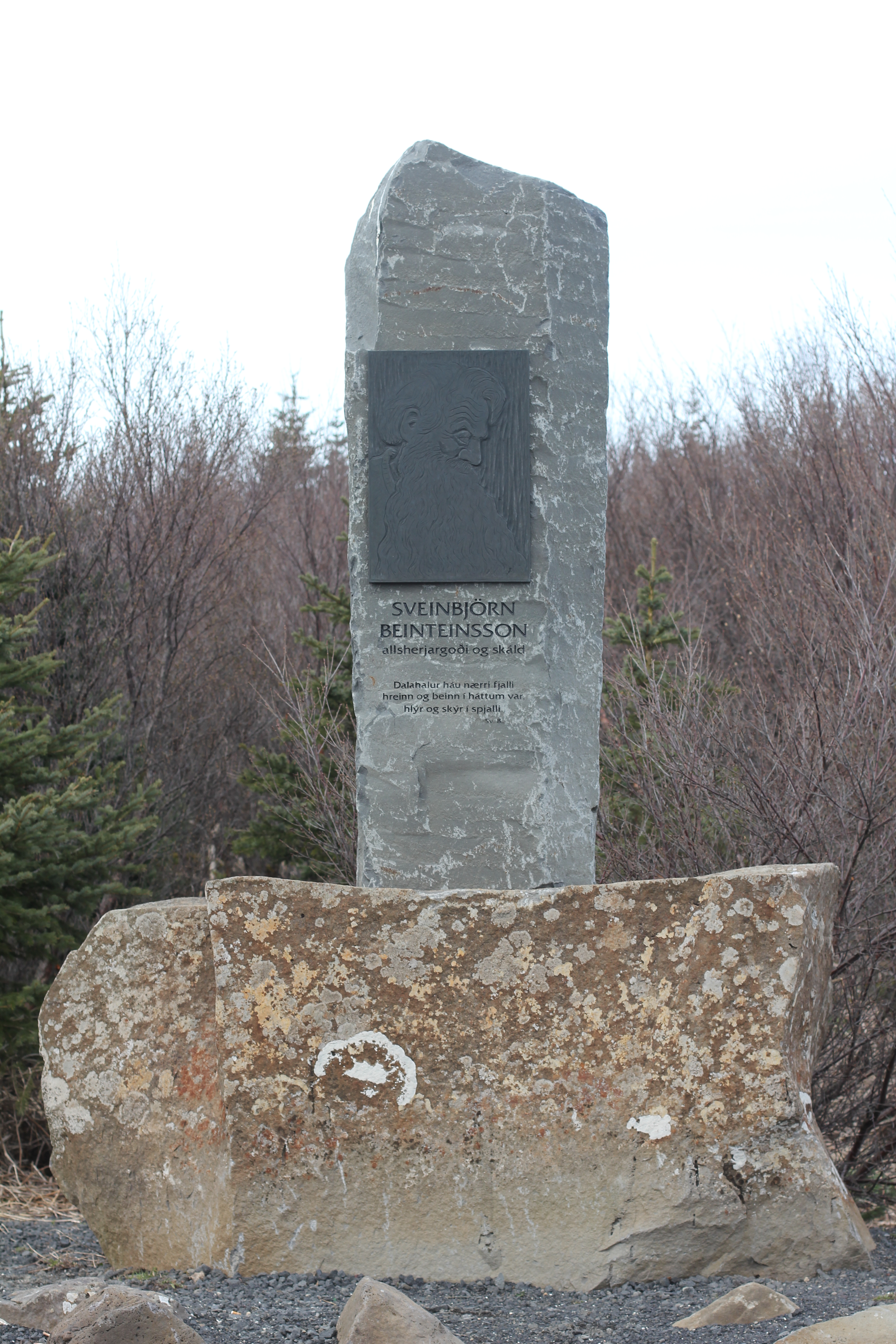
A memorial for Sveinbjörn Beinteinsson has stood next to the building site since 2010.

Hof Ásatrúarfélagsins was designed by the Icelandic architect and Ásatrúarfélagið member Magnús Jensson. Jensson wanted the building to look timeless and neither be a Viking Age pastiche nor specifically modern. The aim was to represent a close relationship to earth, sky and sun. The design incorporates numbers and geometry considered sacred by Ásatrúarfélagið, such as the numbers nine, 432,000 and the golden ratio.

The building is made of concrete and local wood. The main part will have an area of 350 square metres (3,800 sq ft) and hold a maximum of 250 people. It has an oval shape and an inverted dome on top; the intention is to let in sunlight which changes on a daily and seasonal basis. It is built into the side of the hill and uses natural rock as one of its walls, allowing water to flow down the stone wall and be collected in pools.

Next to the building is a memorial stone for Sveinbjörn Beinteinsson, Ásatrúarfélagið's first allsherjargoði. The monument was dedicated on 22 April 2010 with a ceremony that paid tribute to the local landvættir and several gods.

The design allows the building to be expanded in the future. According to Hilmar Örn, there are preliminary plans for an expansion that would provide a facility for international research on subjects related to mythology.

== Name ==
The name used in the media and promotional material, "hof Ásatrúarfélagsins", is descriptive and means "The hall of the ōs faith association" or "The temple of the ōs faith association". The association has asked the public for proposals for the building's official name, but the final decision will be taken shortly before the consecration.

== See also ==
- List of modern pagan temples
