= Ásatrúarfélagið =

Icelandic heathenry organization

Ásatrú Fellowship
- Ásatrúarfélagið
- The logo of Ásatrúarfélagið – organization
- Type: New Religious Movement
- Classification: Neopaganism
- Orientation: Heathenry
- Theology: Icelandic Folk Religion
- Allsherjargoði: Hilmar Örn Hilmarsson
- Founder(s): Sveinbjörn Beinteinsson; Jörmundur Ingi Hansen; Dagur Þorleifsson; Þorsteinn Guðjónsson
- Associations: European Congress of Ethnic Religions
- Region: Iceland
- Language: Icelandic
- Headquarters: Reykjavík
- Origin: 1972; Hótel Borg, Reykjavík
- Members: 6,250 (2025)
- Official website: www.asatru.is

Ásatrúarfélagið (Note: Icelandic pronunciation: [ˈauːsatʰruːarˌfjɛːlaijɪð]) (Icelandic for "Ásatrú Fellowship") is a neopagan religious organisation in Iceland. It follows a form of revived Germanic paganism known as Ásatrú ("faith of the æsir"). It was founded on the first day of summer in 1972, and granted recognition as a registered religious organization in 1973, allowing it to conduct legally binding ceremonies and collect a share of the church tax. The Allsherjargoði is the chief religious official.

The organization was led by farmer and poet Sveinbjörn Beinteinsson from 1972 until his death in 1993. During most of this period membership did not exceed 100 people and after the initial enthusiasm faded, there was little activity. The time of the next high priest, Jörmundur Ingi Hansen (1994–2002), saw considerable growth and activity, including the design of an Ásatrú burial ground. These trends have continued under the present high priest, musician Hilmar Örn Hilmarsson (2003–present), and as of 1 January 2018, the organization has 5770 registered members, about one third of whom are women. Between 2002 and 2018, the number of registered members has grown annually from 8% (2006–2007) to 21% (2011–2012).

Ásatrúarfélagið does not have a fixed religious dogma or theology, but the high priests have tended towards a pantheistic worldview. The central ritual is the communal blót feast, but the priests (goðar) also conduct name-giving ceremonies, coming of age rituals, weddings, and funerals. The organization has on some occasions taken a stance on basic right issues, including abortion and gay marriage, political issues such as the separation of church and state and on environmental issues. The organisation is a founding member of the European Congress of Ethnic Religions.

== History ==
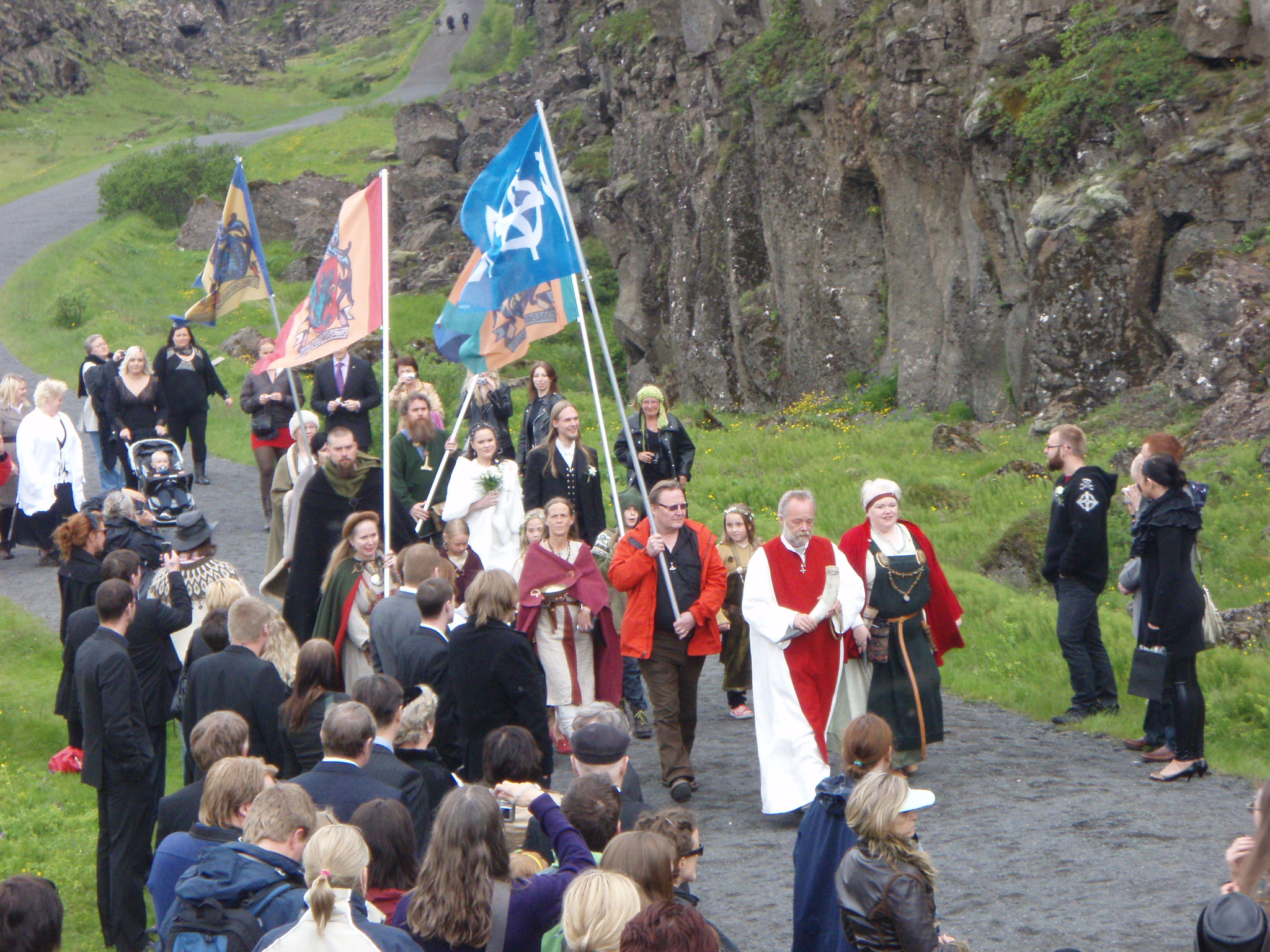
Hilmar Örn Hilmarsson and other members of Ásatrúarfélagið walk to a blót at Þingvellir in the summer of 2009.

=== Origins ===
The idea to found a folk religious organization came about in late winter 1972 in discussions in a café in Reykjavík. The four men who would become the organization's early leaders and ideologues were Sveinbjörn Beinteinsson, a farmer and a traditionalist poet, Jörmundur Ingi Hansen, a jack of all trades and a prominent person in the Reykjavík hippie movement, Dagur Þorleifsson, a journalist and active member of the Reykjavík theosophy lodge, and Þorsteinn Guðjónsson, leader of Félag Nýalssinna, an organization devoted to the theories of Helgi Pjeturss.

Sveinbjörn Beinteinsson described the founding of Ásatrúarfélagið as based on a belief in hidden forces in the land and connected to "the desire that Icelanders could have their own faith, and nourish it no less than imported religions". Dagur Þorleifsson emphasized that the religion constituted a movement back to nature, seeking refuge from the ills of industrial civilization. One observer traces the origins of the organization to the countercultural and religious waves of the time, as well as to nationalism and the widespread Icelandic interest in spiritism, theosophy, and elves.

The Ásatrú organization was formed on the First Day of Summer 1972 in a meeting at Hótel Borg. In a meeting shortly thereafter Sveinbjörn was chosen as chairman and dubbed allsherjargoði.

=== Recognition ===
Shortly before Christmas 1972, Sveinbjörn Beinteinsson and Þorsteinn Guðjónsson visited Ólafur Jóhannesson, minister of justice and ecclesiastical affairs, and expressed interest in registering Ásatrúarfélagið as an official religious organization. The minister at first believed that the request was a joke but when Sveinbjörn and Þorsteinn told him that they were serious he requested additional paperwork. According to Sveinbjörn, shortly after he and Þorsteinn exited the ministry, the lights in the center of town went out due to a thunderstorm, leaving the minister sitting in the dark. The newspaper Vísir wrote about this in a jocular tone, noting that "the representatives of the Ásatrúarmenn got rather vague answers from the minister, — and apparently that's what Thor the thunder god thought as well, because as the visit was at an end and the minister stood up to follow the guests to the door there was a terrible thunder in the center of Reykjavík, causing damage close to the office of the ministry".

Sigurbjörn Einarsson, Bishop of Iceland, recommended to the ministry that the organization not be granted recognition. In a written opinion, later published, the bishop said that the Icelandic constitution granted everyone a right to "found organizations to serve god" and that this assumed a monotheistic outlook. Sigurbjörn cited the opinion of legal scholar Einar Arnórsson, published in 1912, that "polytheistic religious organizations founded [in Iceland] would therefore not be protected by the constitution". Sigurbjörn further criticized the application for not including the declaration of an individual stating that he would assume the leadership of the organization. He criticized the organization for having vague teachings and for not including clear documents on them. He also said that the organization had no dedicated house of worship.

In Sigurbjörn's opinion, the most significant effort to revive Germanic folk religion happened in Nazi Germany and was connected to the racial ideology of that regime. He said that the present applicants had hitherto considered themselves followers of the Nýall theories of Helgi Pjeturss and that these theories contained the same racial elements as the Nazi ideology. (Note: In his youth, the bishop was himself a Nýall follower and, in his own words "wholeheartedly pagan".) (Note: A number of Ásatrúarfélagið's founders participated in Nýall activities, though not all of them did so. Conversely, not all Nýall followers joined Ásatrúarfélagið. Sveinbjörn Beinteinsson says in his autobiography, "My brother Pétur read about the theories of Helgi Pjeturss and was fascinated by them. Then I started studying them as well and I found them remarkable. What appealed to me especially was his theory about life on other stars or planets which replaced the old idea of Heaven; everything was more understandable and more material in what he said. Helgi also had remarkable theories about dreams, he thought they occurred because of influence from other people, even from other stars. This influenced me." Þorsteinn Guðjónsson was a devoted Nýall participant both before and after the founding of Ásatrúarfélagið. In the late 80s he published an English-language journal, Huginn&Muninn, dedicated to Nýall theories, paganism and racial ideology. Jörmundur Ingi Hansen participated in some Nýall séances. In a 2008 interview he said he "did not feel he got any real information from the proceedings" and that he was "not at all convinced that the information that comes forward at meetings like this is actually from deceased individuals".) The bishop expressed concern over the possible moral teachings of an Ásatrú organization, in particular as regarded individualism, polygamy and security of person. Finally he said that the group applying for recognition was small, consisting of 21 individuals. Morgunblaðið, Iceland's biggest daily newspaper, declared its agreement with the bishop in an editorial. The paper stated that the Christian faith was the "basis of Icelandic society" and that "Christ is enough, though he was not enough for Hitler, Stalin or their followers".

In the Asatruars' reply to the bishop's criticism, they argued that even Christianity had some polytheistic elements and that Ásatrú could include a belief in a Supreme Being. They denied any association with national socialism and argued that it was doubtful that the Third Reich had any genuine Asatruars while it was certain that a number of Christian sects had cooperated with the Nazis.

Ásatrúarfélagið was officially recognized as a religious organization by the Icelandic government in May 1973. This gives it the legal right to perform marriages and other ceremonies and also entitles it to a share of the church tax in proportion to its number of adult members.

In the Althing, Halldór Blöndal and Magnús Jónsson, members of the Independence Party, requested an explanation for why Ólafur Jóhannesson had given legal recognition to Ásatrúarfélagið. The minister defended his decision on the grounds that the constitution granted freedom of association and freedom of religion. Magnús Jónsson argued that the constitution applied freedom of religion only to monotheistic religions and that the recognition of an organization practicing polytheism and idol worship was thus an illegal act. The minister countered that legal scholars had debated whether the clause applied to polytheism. (Note: Years earlier, Ólafur Jóhannesson had himself argued that the clause applied to polytheism.)

In 1975, the Althing changed the law in a way that made it more difficult for new religious organizations to gain recognition.

=== First allsherjargoði (1972–1993) ===
Number of members in Ásatrúarfélagið as a function of time

On 5 August 1973, Ásatrúarfélagið held the first public outdoor blót (plural same as singular) in Iceland since public blót were forbidden by law in the year 1000. The event was held at Sveinbjörn Beinteinsson's farm at Dragháls in pelting rain below a plaster statue of the god Thor made by Jörmundur Ingi Hansen. The blót was described by the newspaper Vísir as "vigorous and energetic" while Sigurður A. Magnússon commented that the historic significance of the event had not been matched by the quality of the ceremony, "It could hardly have been simpler or more pedestrian".

Ásatrúarfélagið had received extensive media coverage even in its very early formative stages and by the time of the first public blót that attention extended to foreign media and had become disproportionate to the scale of the event with about as many journalists as participants attending.

Early on, the organization had ambitious plans for building a temple, getting a burial ground, and dividing the land into goðorð, led by individual goðar (a nomenclature borrowed from the political system of the Icelandic Commonwealth). However, membership in the organization did not increase as quickly as these goals would have necessitated. In 1973, Ásatrúarfélagið had 58 registered members, in 1974 it had 70, and in 1976 it had 77. As its leaders realized that the organization's more ambitious goals could not be quickly achieved, the society settled down to a low level of activity. In 1983, a blót had not been held for three years, but one was arranged to provide the makers of a documentary with material.

By the mid-1980s, membership in the organization started to rise every year. In 1985 there were 74 members and by 1992 membership had risen to 119. At that point the organization decided that the time had come for increased activity. The same year, Sveinbjörn Beinteinsson published his autobiography.

Sveinbjörn Beinteinsson acted as allsherjargoði from 1972 until his death in December 1993. He lived a simple life on a farm without modern luxuries. A popular grandfatherly figure, he was "a little eccentric and shy in his role as a media spokesman". He left a lasting impression in people's minds.

=== Second allsherjargoði (1994–2002) ===
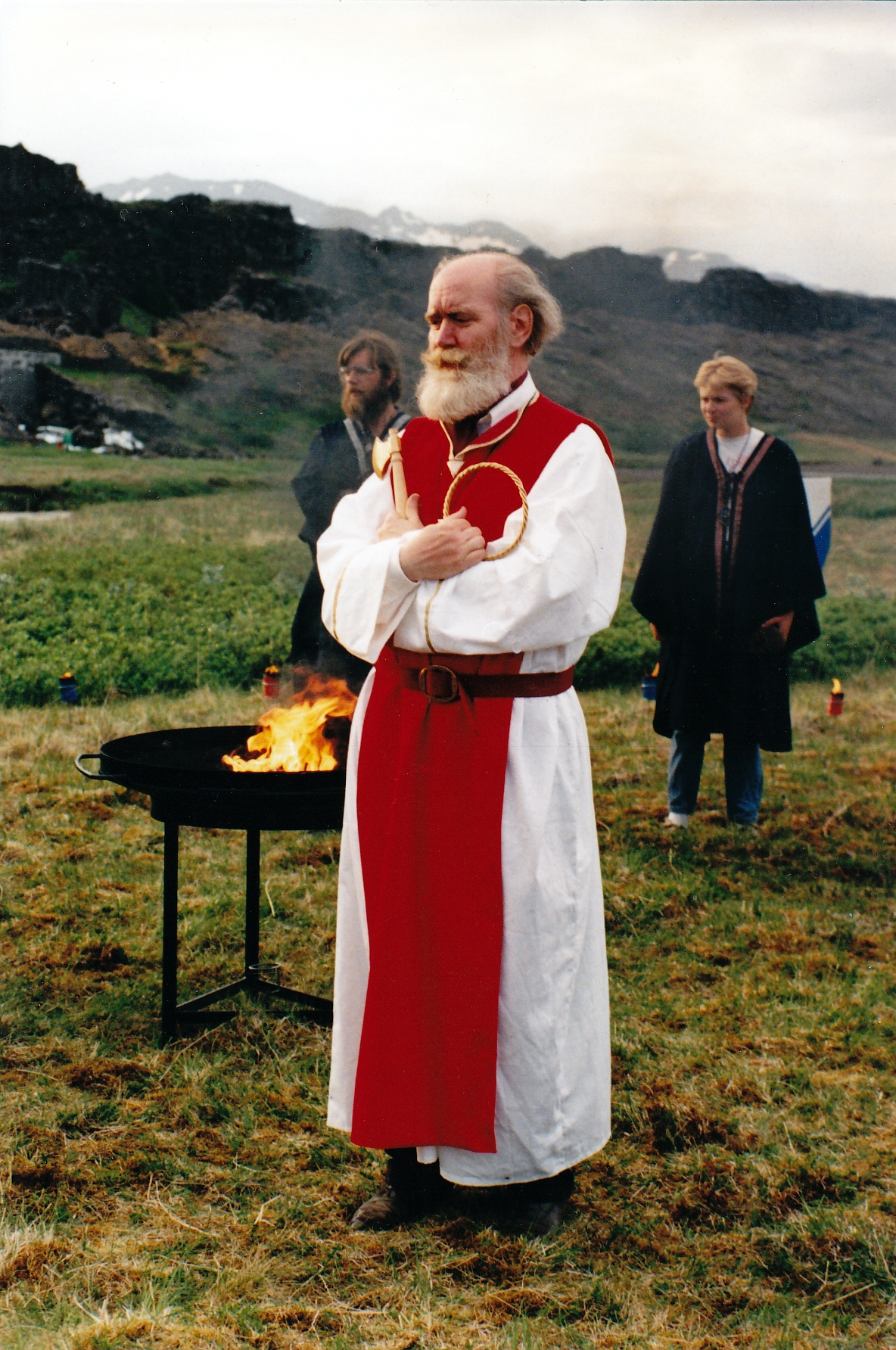
Jörmundur Ingi is sworn in as allsherjargoði in July 1994.

In late 1993, Sveinbjörn Beinteinsson died and in 1994, elections were held for a new allsherjargoði. The candidates were Jörmundur Ingi Hansen and Haukur Halldórsson. Jörmundur Ingi ran on a platform of continuity while Haukur promised more innovation. Jörmundur Ingi won with 59 votes against 34.

While Jörmundur was, like Sveinbjörn, an older man knowledgeable in ancient literature, he differed from his predecessor in his greater skill at dealing with the media. Jörmundur's time as allsherjargoði saw a rapid rise in membership in the organization, going from 172 in 1994 to 628 in 2002. Jörmundur's time also saw an increase in the percentage of women members, going from 13% in 1994 to 21% in 2002.

In 1999, the organization achieved one of its oldest goals of having a burial ground of its own. The burial ground was designed by Jörmundur Ingi and the first burial took place the same year.

In the summer of 2000, on the occasion of the 1000 year commemoration of the Christianisation of Iceland, the Icelandic state and the Church of Iceland organized a celebration at Þingvellir. Ásatrúarfélagið had its own annual blót at Þingvellir at the same time, leading to conflict over the use of facilities with some underlying ideological tensions. In the end, more than 1000 people participated in Ásatrúarfélagið's summer event, more than in any previous ceremony by the organization.

In 2000, Ásatrúarfélagið passed the Buddhist Association of Iceland and the Icelandic Bahá'i Community to become Iceland's largest non-Christian religious organization.

The growth of the organization brought with it increased complexity and internal disputes.

=== Third and fourth allsherjargoðar (2002–present) ===
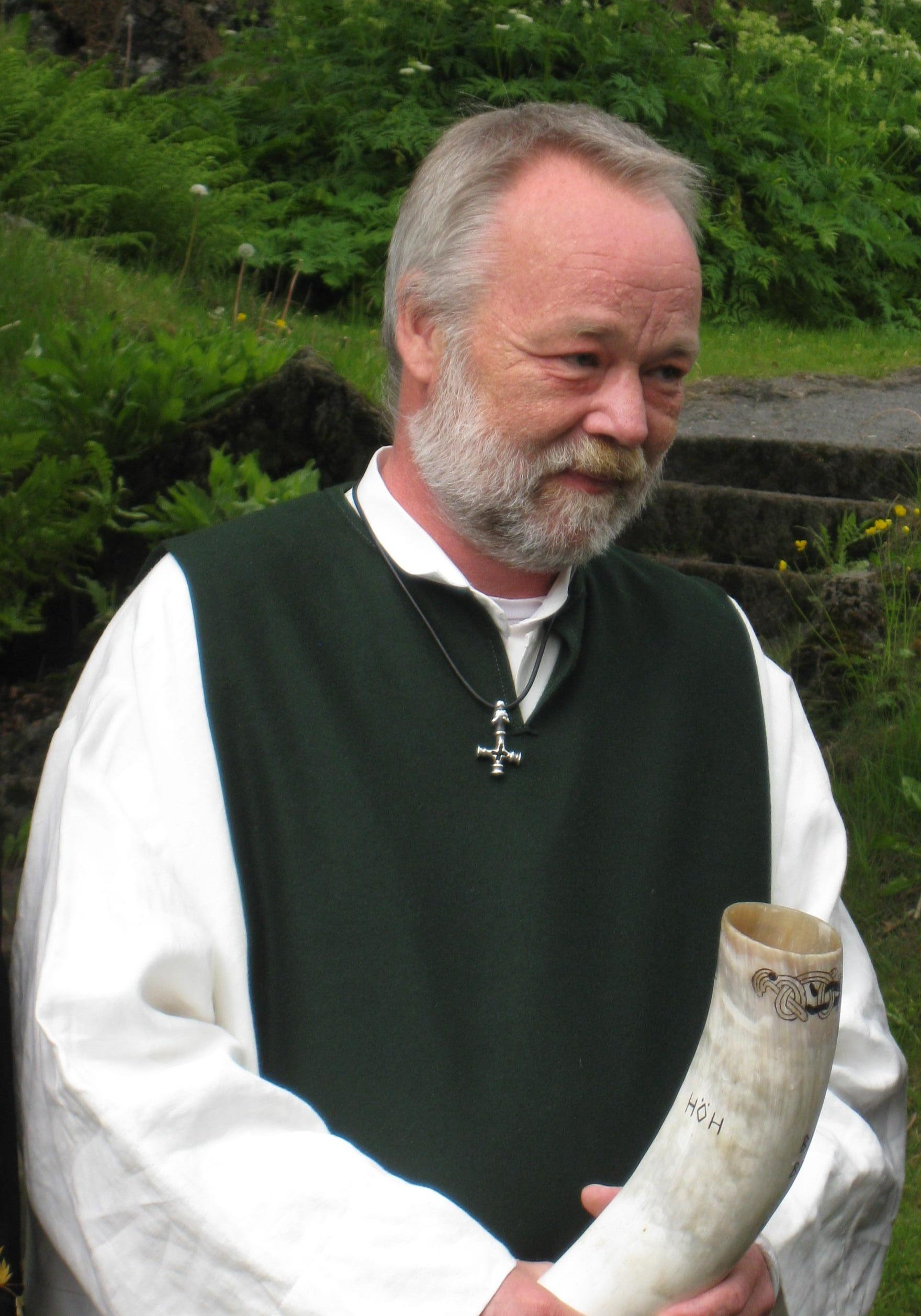
Hilmar Örn Hilmarsson, fourth allsherjargoði, at a ceremony in June 2009

In 2002, the board of directors sacked Jörmundur and installed Jónína Kristín Berg (born 1962) as temporary allsherjargoði. In 2003, musician Hilmar Örn Hilmarsson (born 1958), was chosen as allsherjargoði. As of 2018, he remains in office. The demographic trends of previous years have continued. The number of members went from 628 in 2002 to 4126 in 2018 (from 0.20% to 1.18% of the population of Iceland) while the percentage of women has gone from 21% in 2002 to 33% in 2018.

Year	Members	Growth (membership)	Growth (percentage)
2002	570	X	11%
2003	636	66	12%
2004	787	151	24%
2005	879	92	12%
2006	960	81	9%
2007	1040	80	8%
2008	1154	114	11%
2009	1275	121	10%
2010	1402	127	10%
2011	1700	298	21%
2012	1951	251	15%
2013	2148	197	10%
2014	2382	234	11%
2015	2675	293	12%
2016	3187	512	19%
2017	3583	396	12%
2018	4186	603	17%
2019	4473	287	7%
2020	4723	250	6%
2021	5221	498	11%
2022	5770	549	11%

In 2006, the Ministry of Justice increased the number of Ásatrú priests allowed to conduct legally binding ceremonies (Icelandic: vígsluréttindi) from two (the allsherjargoði and his substitute) to five. Two of those five priests are women. As of 2018, there were 10 priests who are officially allowed by the government to conduct legally binding ceremonies.

== Beliefs and theology ==
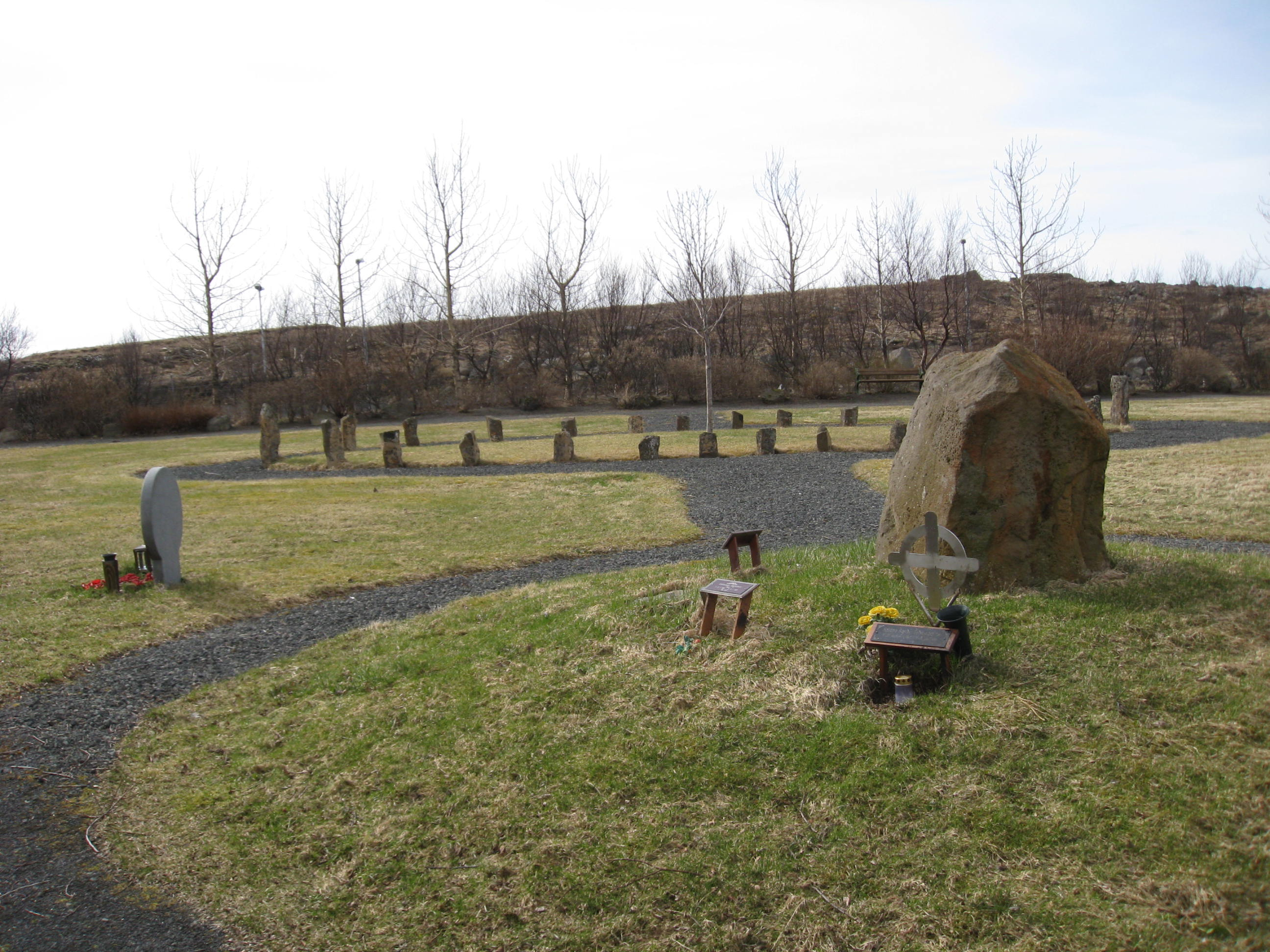
The Ásatrú graveyard in Reykjavík

The website of Ásatrúarfélagið (as of 2009) defines Ásatrú as belief "in the Icelandic/Nordic folklore, the spirits and entities the folklore represents, in addition to gods and other beings from the Nordic pantheism".

From the beginning, Ásatrúarfélagið has not had any fixed religious dogma or theology. Individual members have various beliefs (there are, for example, a number of Wiccan members). Though members are not expected to follow the lead of any religious authority, all the high priests have publicly expressed their personal beliefs at one point or another.

Sveinbjörn Beinteinsson summarized his religious convictions in his autobiography, saying that he had not a simple religious conviction but a "somewhat unquiet faith".

My faith is based on a constant search but I don't search frantically. It's no use to rush out into space to search for some gods there, if they want to have anything to do with me, they will come. I have often become aware of them, but I don't rush after them or shout at them. I have gotten to know them a bit in myself and also in other people. ... Primarily it is the effects of the great force felt by everyone that make me religious. ... The most remarkable thing about faith is that it gives us growth, the possibility to grow and thrive. And humility cannot be neglected. Without it we cannot live to any useful degree, though of course it has its particular place. But a man who is completely without it is a madman.

In a 1992 interview, Jörmundur Ingi Hansen expressed his views on various theological subjects, including the nature of the gods and the basis of his Ásatrú beliefs.

From my perspective, the world is split into two in its nature, divided into constructive forces, the æsir, and the destructive forces which we call jötnar. ... Ásatrú or heathenry is basically only to realize this dichotomy and to decide to side with the æsir. The best way to do that, in my opinion, is to be self-consistent, live in harmony with nature, associate with it with respect and to submit to the public order. ... The gods shape the dwelling places of people, the earth and the solar system out of the material that already exists. To that extent we can look on the forces of nature as the gods themselves and to a large extent that is what people did in antiquity.

In a 1996 interview, Jónína K. Berg said:

Ásatrú is a pantheistic belief. The earth, the air and the water has great value to us. We are a part of the earth and not its masters.

In a 2003 interview, Hilmar Örn Hilmarsson summarized his faith.

I believe in a higher power which appears to us in the multiplicity of nature and of human life. We have manifestations of certain primal forces which we regard as gods and we have a division in the roles of the gods. These are powers that are visible, half-visible and sometimes invisible. One could have a long scholarly discussion on the role of individual gods, but in the end this is a question of a feeling for the different aspects of life.

Monotheism is one truth for the masses, but polytheism is many truths for the individual.

— Hilmar Örn Hilmarsson, interviewed in 2010

== Blót and other rituals ==
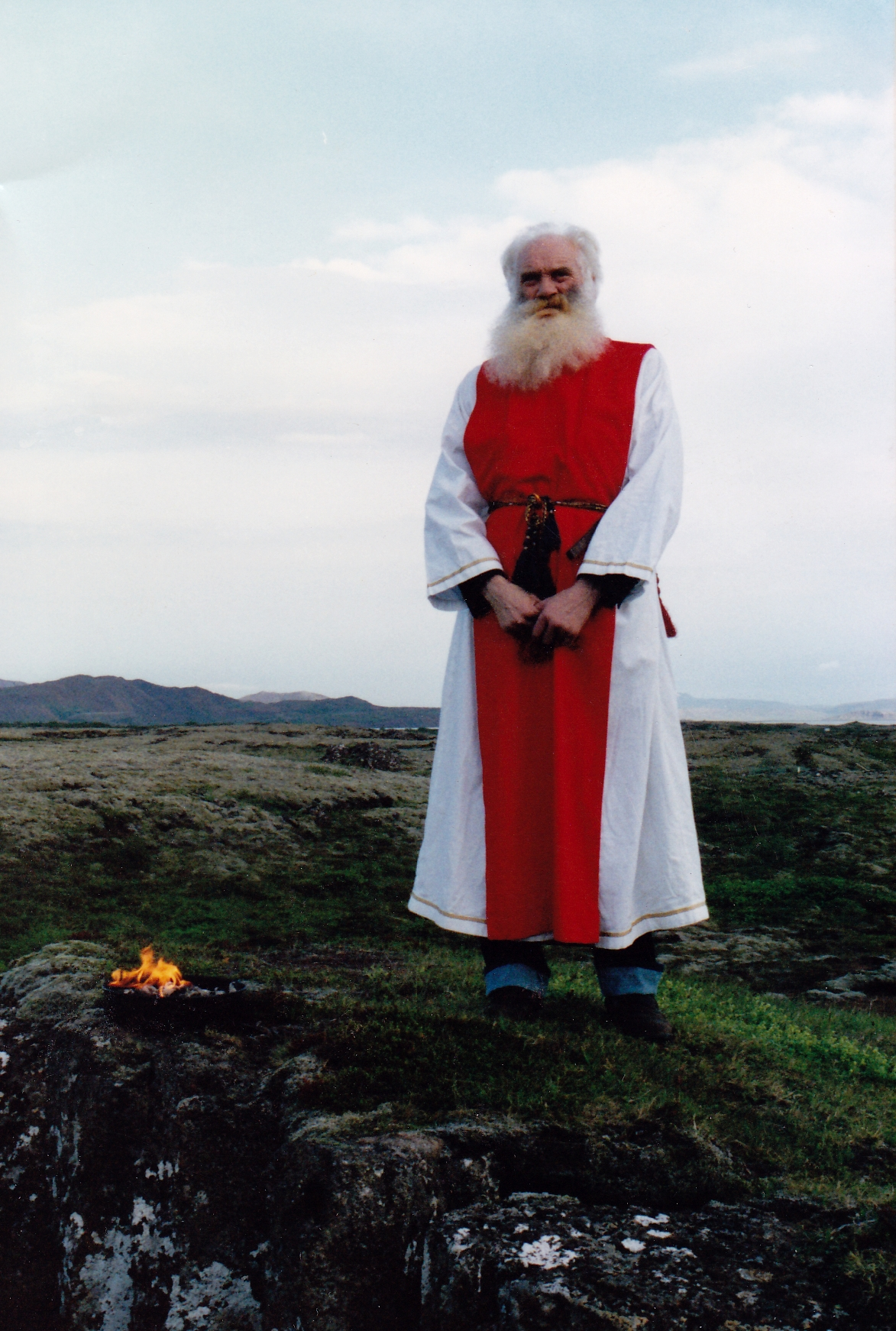
Sveinbjörn Beinteinsson at a blót in 1991

The central ritual performed by Ásatrúarfélagið is the communal blót feast. A blót starts with a goði hallowing the ceremony with a certain formula and declaring a truce between all present. This is followed by the reciting or chanting of verses from the Poetic Edda. Next, a drinking horn is passed around and participants drink to the gods, the wights, and the ancestors. Libations are offered. This initial part of the ceremony, often conducted outdoors, is followed by a communal feast, typically indoors. The feast is often accompanied by musical performances or other forms of entertainment.

In the early days of the movement, the founders were asked whether they conducted ritual slaughter of animals during blót. The general response was that while this would not be morally problematic it was not practical. Sveinbjörn Beinteinsson commented:

No, for the simple reason that we can't be bothered. It's far easier to just get a carcass so that's what we do. In earlier times it was normal to slaughter the animal in place because people couldn't store meat. But in modern circumstances it's completely unnecessary and too much trouble.

Nevertheless, during the first public blót "a sympathizing visual artist brought along a live cock and had it beheaded in the kitchen, while the lamb was being cooked".

Ásatrúarfélagið has since stated that it rejects the use of Ásatrú as a justification for animal sacrifice, as well as for militarism and supremacy ideology.

The four main blót are Jólablót ("Yule blót") on the winter solstice, Sigurblót ("Victory blót") on the First Day of Summer, Sumarblót ("Summer blót") on the summer solstice, and Veturnáttablót ("Winter Nights blót") on the First Day of Winter. The organization also holds Þorrablót and individual goðar hold local blót on various occasions.

Other rituals include name-giving ceremonies, siðfesta (a coming of age ritual), weddings and burials. The first Ásatrú name-giving ceremony took place in November 1973. Sveinbjörn Beinteinsson performed the first Ásatrú wedding ceremony in August 1977, marrying Dagur Þorleifsson and Ingibjörg Hjartardóttir. Since 1999, the organization has its own burial ground and several burials have taken place.

As a part of the Jólablót, children light candles to celebrate the rebirth of the sun. The organization has intermittently run a Sunday school and a youth group.

== Religious buildings ==
=== Main hof ===
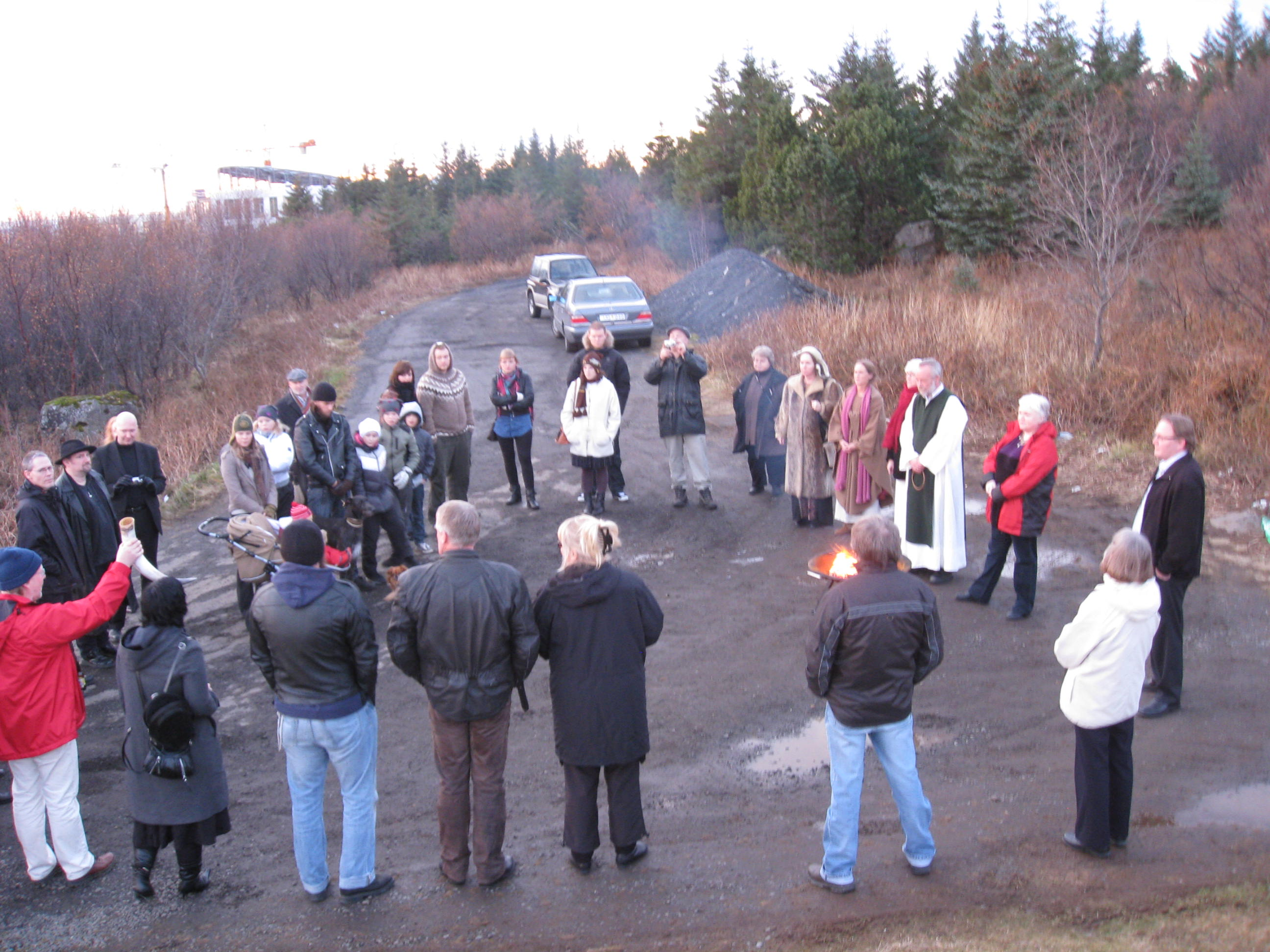
Veturnáttablót 2009 on the site where the temple was to be built

In 2005, a decision was made to sell the organization's property. The property had increased substantially in value since it was bought in 1998. The profit from the sale made building a temple (referred to by the organisation in Icelandic as a hof) a realistic option and an application for a plot of land was sent to the Reykjavík city council. Processing of the application took longer than the organization had hoped for due to political instability in Reykjavík. In January 2008, a plot of land was finally granted in Öskjuhlíð, a wooded hill in Reykjavík "The temple will be built into the surrounding cliffs and overlooks the beautiful Nauthólsvík beach. Its design is timeless; being neither contemporary nor reminiscent of the Viking era." Ásatrúarfélagið commissioned five architects to present proposals for a temple building. Those were ready in September 2008. The organization lost a substantial amount of money in the collapse of the Icelandic banks in October 2008 but proceeded with study of different options for a temple building. The architect Magnús Jensson was chosen; it was announced in February 2015 that the temple construction would start in early 2015, and in 2016 that the temple would be completed in 2017. However, technical problems led to a temporary halt in 2017, and at that time completion was not expected until 2018.

In June 2019, Hilmar Örn announced that the building would be constructed in stages. The office part would become operational before the social gathering area. By April 2022, Ásatrúarfélagið had moved into the office part and the social part was close to being finished. In July 2023, Hilmar Örn said that the building will be completed whenever the organization can afford materials without taking a loan.

=== Ásheimar ===
Árni Sverrisson, a member of Ásatrúarfélagið, built a hof at his farm Efri Ás in Skagafjörður from 2010 to 2014. The project started as a small building which eventually grew to 80 square meters. The building was constructed with stone and turf walls, a wooden framework and a turf covered roof. It was named Ásheimar and consecrated by the goði Jóhanna Harðardóttir in 2014.

== Politics and activism ==
While the first few decades of Ásatrúarfélagið saw it embracing a strongly conservative and purportedly far-right ideology, this influence in the religion has declined over time. Two years after its formation, in June 1974, Ásatrúarfélagið issued a press release opposing the legalization of abortion and recommending strict punishment for distributors of narcotics. In April 1975, there was another press release opposing abortion, this time noting that the battle for legalization of abortion could be "traced to international movements opposed to the Nordic nations and in particular to the Nordic race". A few days later, Sveinbjörn Beinteinsson stated that this latter press release did not have its origins in any legal meeting of Ásatrúarfélagið and only represented the private opinions of its author.

In the following years, Ásatrúarfélagið mostly did not involve itself in political questions, though individual members did. Having been unable to advance his racial ideology within Ásatrúarfélagið, Þorsteinn Guðjónsson in 1982 founded a separate organization, Norrænt mannkyn ("Nordic Race"), to lobby for the reduction of immigration and banning of abortion. Sveinbjörn Beinteinsson was active in the peace movement, erecting a níðstöng against nuclear weapons in 1985.

Summarizing her 1991 study of Germanic folk religion, literary scholar Stefanie von Schnurbein describes Ásatrúarfélagið as a "mix of individualistic anarchists, atheistic church opponents, and racist spiritualists". In a 2001 study of Ásatrú in Iceland, anthropologist María Erlendsdóttir disagreed, pointing out that von Schnurbein's field research included only two interviews with members of the organization and arguing that this was "not enough to give sound grounds to her accusations". She further argued that "the heavy accusations of Von Schnurbein contradict certain clues that Ásatrúarfélagið has an open mind to people of other cultures and races" and concluded that "Icelandic paganism in contemporary society has strong roots within folk belief and literary tradition".

In a 2000 study of Ásatrúarfélagið, religious studies scholar Michael Strmiska noted that while "Ásatrú movements in America and Scandinavia have been known to espouse racist and Neo-Nazi ideology", he was "not aware of any member of Icelandic Ásatrú espousing such sentiments or ideology".

Since early on, environmentalism has been important to members of Ásatrúarfélagið and the organization has been active in environmentalist causes. In October 2003, Hilmar Örn Hilmarsson erected a níðstöng against the Kárahnjúkar Hydropower Plant. Jóhanna G. Harðardóttir, a goði, wrote on the occasion: "We have come to call upon gods and good wights. We intend to ask for mercy for our land and we intend to erect a níðstöng to those who dishonor their mother, the earth."

In 2003, Sigurjón Þórðarson, an active member of Ásatrúarfélagið and a goði, was elected to the Althing for the Liberal Party. When asked if his faith shaped the way he approached laws and the structure of government he replied: "I'm in favour of separating faith and law, but I do think that faith marks the individual."

Since 2007, Ásatrúarfélagið participates in forest reclamation in Heiðmörk with the Icelandic Forestry Association.

In more recent decades, the organization has fought for the right to marry gay couples.

Ásatrúarfélagið has also fought for the separation of church and state, and for a share in a fund currently only accessible to the National Church. The Church supports the latter effort. Ásatrúarfélagið cooperates on issues of common concern with other Icelandic religious organizations, in particular the Reykjavík Free Church.

In August 2014, Ásatrúarfélagið issued a statement against the abuse of their name and their religion:

We strongly oppose any attempt by individuals to use their association with the Ásatrúarfélag of Iceland to promote attitudes, ideologies and practices rejected by the leadership of the Ásatrúarfélag. We particularly reject the use of Ásatrú as a justification for supremacy ideology, militarism and animal sacrifice. It should also be known that visitors have no authority to speak on our behalf. There is no advisor to the Ásatrúarfélag and there is no spokesman other than our allsherjargoði. We respectfully request that visitors not claim any such authority based on their association with us.

== See also ==
- Ásatrú holidays
- Huldufólk (i.e., hidden people)
- Norse paganism
- Religion in Iceland

== Bibliography ==
- María Erlendsdóttir. Pagan Beliefs in Modern Iceland. University of Edinburgh, 2001.
- Pétur Pétursson. Asasamfundet på Island och massmedia. Religionssociologiska institutet, 1985. ISSN 0347-8653
- von Schnurbein, Stefanie. Religion als Kulturkritik: Neugermanisches Heidentum im 20. Jahrhundert. Winter, 1992. ISBN 3-533-04582-X
- Sigurður A. Magnússon. The Icelanders. Forskot, 1990. ISBN 9979-9000-0-8
- Sveinbjörn Beinteinsson and Berglind Gunnarsdóttir. Allsherjargoðinn. Hörpuútgáfan, 1992. ISBN 9979-50-025-5
