= KKTO =

KKTO may refer to:

- Kata Kovács and Tom O’Doherty, a Hungarian-Irish artist duo often also referred to by the stylised abbreviation KKTO
- KXJZ, a non-commercial, listener-supported public radio station in Sacramento, California which has a repeater station named KKTO
