= Hošek Contemporary =

Art gallery in Berlin, Germany

- Established: 2016
- Location: Berlin
- Coordinates: 52.5143°N 13.4097°E
- Founder: Petr Hošek
- Curator: Linda Toivio
- Website: hosekcontemporary.com

Hošek Contemporary is a gallery located on a barge in central Berlin. The gallery focuses mainly on performing arts, experimental music, installations and dance. It was founded in 2016.

== History ==
Hošek Contemporary was founded by Petr Hošek in 2016. It opened its doors for the first time in Rosa-Luxemburg Strasse 26, Berlin, as a classical white cube gallery. The first exhibition to be held at the gallery was Tang Dynastie by German artist Herbert Eugen Wiegand. In 2017 the gallery moved to Oranienburgerstrasse 22 before transferring to its current location on the MS Heimatland barge a year later. Sound installations are a feature of the gallery space and events are hosted weekly.

The gallery moved to its present home on board the MS Heimatland barge in 2018. The Heimatland was constructed in Germany in 1910 and was originally named the IDA. During World War II it served as a munitions transporter and was captured by British military forces towards the end of the war. Its owners renamed the vessel the Heimatland (Home Land) after its return by the British. Up until the late 1990s the Heimatland was used as a commercial transporter. It is currently located at Fischerinsel in central Berlin.

On September 17th, 2024, while hosting an event, the roof caved in and several people were injured.

== Hošek Contemporary Prize and Residency ==
The gallery has organised the “Hošek Contemporary Prize” since 2021. The prize is awarded to three projects annually, with each winner receiving prize money and the opportunity to use the gallery's exhibition space on the Heimatland. Winners of the prize include Israeli artist Tomer Zirkilevich and Irène Hug.

Separate to the annual prize, the gallery also has an artists residency including use of the performance space on the Heimatland. Artists from outside Berlin also have the opportunity to live on the barge. One of the first artists to participate in the residency was Serbian artist Ivana Ivkovic.

== Exhibitions ==
Herbert E. Wiegend was the first artist to show his work at the gallery with his Tang Dynastie exhibition in 2016. The exhibition consisted of a series of graphic works by Wiegend based on his observations of everyday life.

April 2018 saw the gallery move aboard the MS Heimatland with the grand opening exhibition by Icelandic artist Gunnhildur Hauksdóttir and Michael Klinger from Germany. The exhibition combined performance (Hauksdóttir's Pendulum Choir), sound (Five Drawings also by Hauksdóttir) and light (seven minimalist light objects by Klinger).

Among recent exhibitions to be staged by the gallery are by the artists Hildur Henrysdottir (Chrysalis), Lauren Moffatt (Local Binaries) and Sanna Helena Berger (Ego & Orchestra), and Kata Kovács and Tom O’Doherty (Carried Bells and Woven All of Dream and Error).
