= Magnús góði Guðmundarson =

Icelandic historical figure

Magnús Guðmundarson
- Born: 1172
- Died: 20 September 1240 (aged 67–68)
- Occupation: Gothi
- Years active: 1197-1234
- Known for: Allsherjargoði of the Althing

Magnús góði Guðmundarson (or Guðmundsson; 1172 – 20 September 1240) was a medieval chieftain (gothi) of Þingvellir in Iceland. He was the allsherjargoði of the Althing (assembly of free men) from 1197 to 1234. He inherited the office from his father Guðmundr gríss Ámundason, who was the descendant of Ingólfur Arnarson, one of the first Viking settlers on the island. Magnús was the next-to-last allsherjargoði before the dissolution of the Icelandic Commonwealth in 1262. He had no offspring, and contemporary sources only offer conjectures about his successor, possibly Árni óreiða Magnússon, nephew of Guðmundr gríss Ámundason and son-in-law of the skald Snorri Sturluson. In fact, the sagas narrate that Sturluson caused Magnús's fall: during his first term as lawspeaker, Sturluson convinced the Althing to outlaw (skógarmaðr) Magnús. Despite his title, Magnús was not one of Iceland's more powerful citizens.

According to konungsannáll, Magnús obtained the support of the clans Haukdælir, Oddaverjar and Svínfellingar to become bishop of Skálholt in 1236, but he did not obtain the Apostolic Blessing since he did not fulfil the requirements for the position; his candidacy was approved neither by the Norwegian archdiocese nor the Pope.

== Literature ==
- Björn Þorsteinsson: Íslensk miðaldasaga , 2. útg., Sögufélagið, Rvk. 1980
- Byock, Jesse L .: Medieval Iceland: Society, Sagas, and Power, University of California Press, US, 1990
- Gunnar Karlsson: "Frá þjóðveldi til konungsríkis", "Saga Íslands II", ed. Sigurður Líndal, Hið íslenzka bókmenntafélag, Sögufélagið, Reykjavík 1975
- "Goðar og bændur", s. 5-57, Saga X , Sögufélagið, Reykjavík, 1972
- Vísindavefurinn: Hvað var Sturlungaöld?
