= Sveinbjörn Beinteinsson =

Icelandic religious leader and singer (1924–1993)

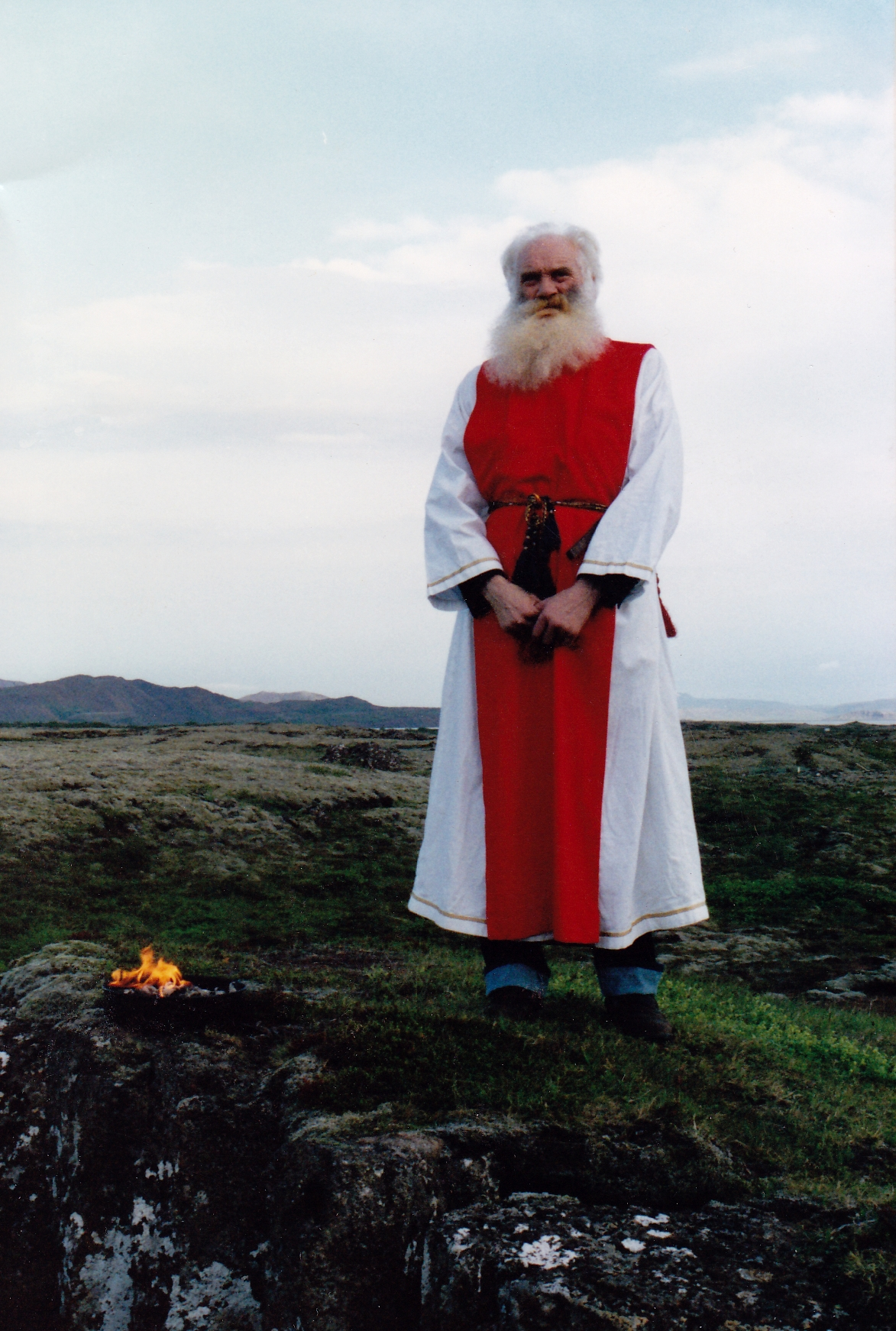
- Sveinbjörn Beinteinsson at a blót in 1991
- Born: 4 July 1924; Iceland
- Died: 23 December 1993 (aged 69); Iceland
- Occupations: allsherjargoði, sheep farmer, poet
- Spouse: Svanfríður Hagvaag

Sveinbjörn Beinteinsson (4 July 1924 – 23 December 1993) was an Icelandic religious leader and singer of rímur who was instrumental in gaining the Icelandic government's recognition of pre-Christian Heathenry in the country.

== Biography ==
Sveinbjörn lived his entire life in West Iceland Borgarfjörður. From 1944 on, he was a sheep farmer while also pursuing literary interests on the side. He published a book of rímur in 1945, a textbook on the verse forms of rímur in 1953, two volumes of his own verse in 1957 and 1976, and edited several anthologies. He was married to Svanfríður Hagvaag with whom he had two sons, born in 1965 and 1966.

The Ásatrúarfélagið ("Fellowship of Æsir faith"), which he co-founded in 1972, and for which he acted as allsherjargoði, was officially recognised as a religious body in 1973.

Sveinbjörn is regarded with much respect and affection amongst Germanic neopagans. He was not only well known as a rímur singer, or kvæðamaður, in Iceland but also attracted fans and audiences throughout Europe and North America. He sometimes performed at rock concerts and is the opening act in the film Rokk í Reykjavík, directed by Friðrik Þór Friðriksson. Sveinbjörn can be heard singing on the bootleg album "Ragnarok (A New Beginning)" by Burzum, on the last track of the album entitled "Hávamál". In 1978, Sveinbjörn appeared on the television program In Search Of in an episode on "Lost Vikings" which examined the possibility of Viking pre-Columbian contact with North America. Sveinbjörn can be heard performing Ásatrú marriage rites for Genesis and Paula P-Orridge on Psychic TV's LP Live in Reykjavik and on the double LP entitled Those who do not.

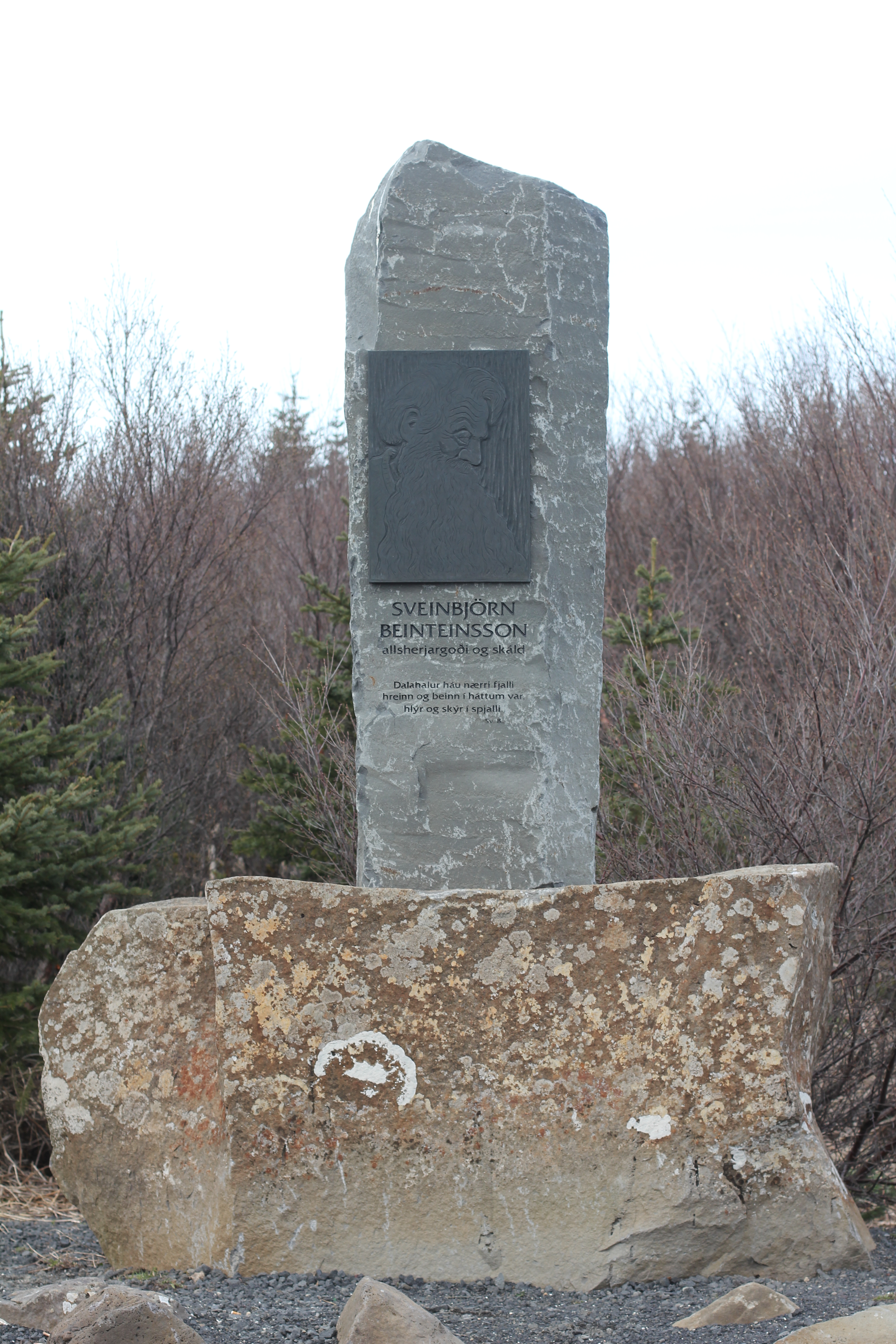
Sveinbjörn Beinteinsson's memorial stone in Reykjavík was erected in 2010.

In 1982 Sveinbjörn released an album, Eddukvæði (Songs from The Poetic Edda), in which he recites in rímur style 75 stanzas from Hávamál, Völuspá and Sigrdrífumál. The album, on the Gramm label, included a booklet of the poems in Icelandic, with translations into English, Swedish, and German.

David Tibet released a CD of Sveinbjörn performing his own rímur and reciting the traditional Poetic Edda under the title Current 93 presents Sveinbjörn 'Edda' in two editions through the World Serpent Distribution.

His biography Allsherjargoðinn was written by Berglind Gunnarsdóttir and published in 1992.

A memorial stone for Sveinbjörn was inaugurated in Reykjavík on 22 April 2010. It is located next to the site of the planned hof Ásatrúarfélagsins on the hill Öskjuhlíð.

His sister, Halldóra B. Björnsson, translated Beowulf into Icelandic as Bjólfskviða, "The Lay of Bjólfur" in 1968; a version was published in 1983.

== Publications ==
=== Writings ===
- Gömlu lögin, 1945.
- Bragfræði og háttatal, 1953.
- Stuðlagaldur, 1954.
- Vandkvæði, 1957.
- Reiðljóð, 1957.
- Heiðin, 1984.
- Gátur I-III, 1985–91.
- Bragskógar, 1989.

=== As editor ===
Sveinbjörn Beinteinsson's 1982 album, Eddukvæði

- Rímnavaka, 1959.
- Rímnasafn, 1966.
- Fúsakver, 1976.
- Rimnasafn Sigurðar Breiðfjörð 1–6, 1961–73.
- Borgfirðingaljóð: ljóð eftir 120 höfunda, 1991.

=== Discography ===
- Snælda tengd Bragfræði og háttatali, 1981.
- Eddukvæði, 1982.
- 93 Current 93 Present Sveinbjörn Beinteinsson: Edda, 1990.

== Bibliography ==
- Sveinbjörn Beinteinsson, Berglind Gunnarsdóttir. Allsherjargoðinn. Hörpuútgáfan, 1992. ISBN 9979-50-025-5.
