= Haukur Halldórsson =

Icelandic artist (1937–2024)

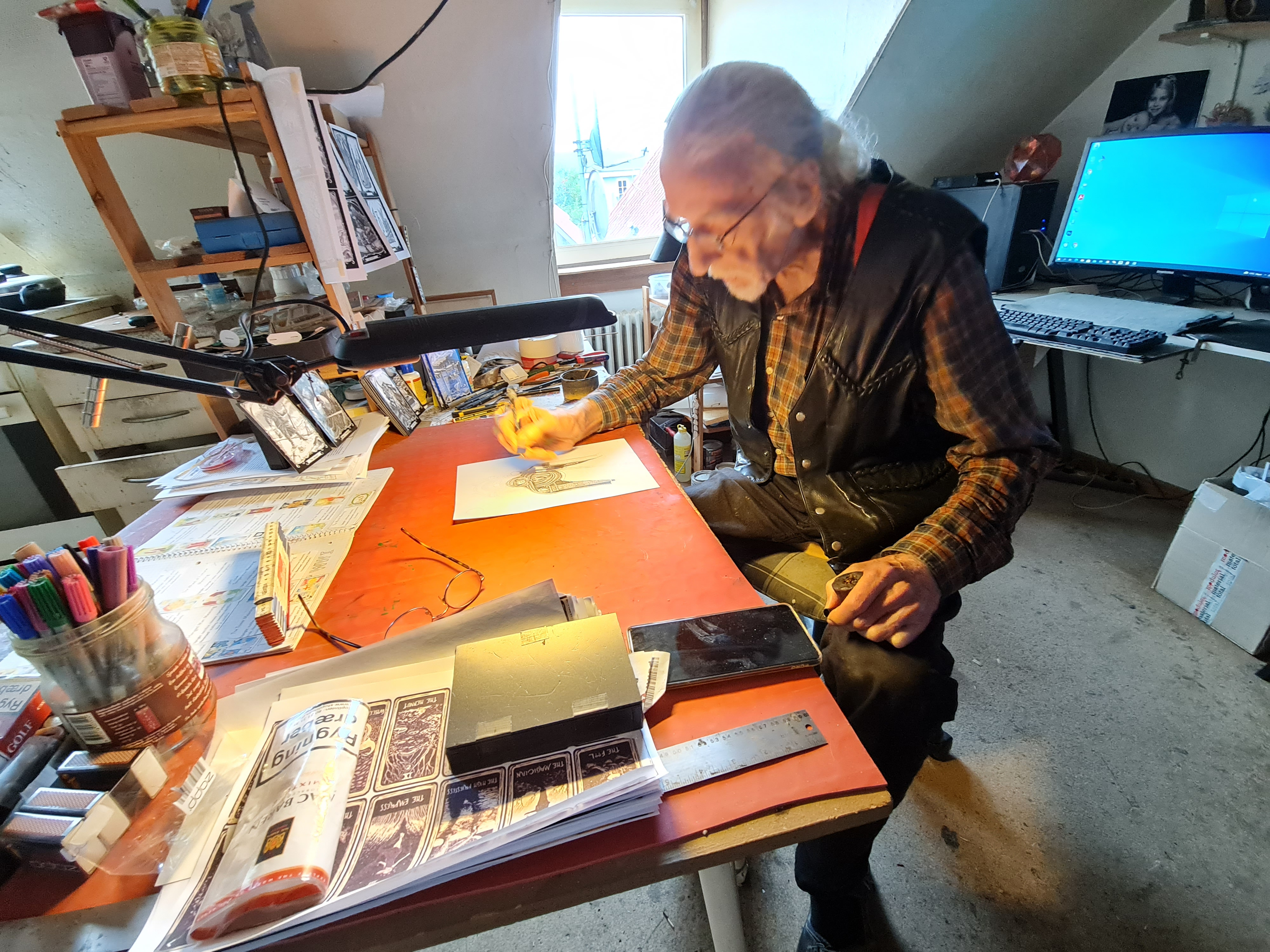
- Halldorsson at work in Tønder Denmark
- Born: Haukur Lárus Halldórsson; 4 July 1937; Reykjavík, Iceland
- Died: 30 July 2024 (aged 87)
- Education: Art and Design
- Occupations: Artist and illustrator
- Known for: Illustrations
- Notable work: The Arctic Henge, Yggdrasil Divination Deck

Haukur Halldórsson (4 July 1937 – 30 July 2024) was an Icelandic artist and illustrator. After beginning his career as a graphic designer and illustrator he developed into a visual artist. Halldórsson's work also included sculpture. He was a co-author of the Yggdrasil Divination Deck together with his daughter Gunnhildur Hauksdóttir.

== Biography and personal life ==
Haukur Halldórsson was born in Reykjavík in 1937. He married Sigrún Kristjánsdóttir and has three children with her: a son Kristján Már Hauksson, who works in digital advertising, daughter Hallgerður Haukssdóttir, chairwoman of the Icelandic Animal Association, and contemporary artist Gunnhildur Hauksdóttir who worked with Halldórsson on several projects. He was active in the Icelandic neopagan organisation Ásatrúarfélagið. In 1994, he stood for election to become the organization's allsherjargoði, but lost to Jörmundur Ingi Hansen. Aside from his artistic work Halldórsson was a commercial designer, a sailor and builder for over the years. He died in Iceland on 30 July 2024, at the age of 87.

== Education and early career ==
He studied at the Icelandic College of Art and Crafts but never graduated. He moved to Copenhagen to continue his studies in design and print and returned to Iceland in the early 1960s, There, he started the advertising agency Cello with his friend from studying in Denmark, Egil Nordheim. He subsequently started Kassgerðin Design Agency in partnership with Bragi Hinriksson. After Kassagerðin, he worked independently in advertising until the early 1980s when he started focusing solely on becoming an artist.

During his years as a designer, he worked on multiple projects, ranging from stamps to different packaging designs. While at Kassagerðin he created the promotional material for H-dagurinn in 1968 when Iceland moved from left traffic to right.

== As an Artist ==
Halldorsson's main subject matter revolved around themes of folklore of his home country Iceland, the Brothers Grimm, Celtic mythology and Nordic mythology. He created numerous drawings and illustrations on the subjects. Halldórsson travelled widely to research art, to China, various countries in Europe, and the United States. In New Mexico he encountered Navajo people and observed the art of sandpainting, which he later applied in his own art practice.

His selection of works from 1978 to 2024 combined disparate elements from the worlds of fantasy, myth and everyday experience. His artwork often contained mythical and magical entities as much of his practice revolved around North-European mythology and Nordic mythology. He gathered information about historical pagan European calendars and myths associated with different parts of the year, which formed the basis for some of his works.

One of his most famous works is the Arctic Henge (Heimskautsgerðið), a series of circles and basalt columns that began its construction in 2004 at the village Raufarhöfn in northeastern Iceland. It has a diameter of 52 meters, functioning as a pagan calendar with numerous references to Norse mythology particularly the Dvergatal of the Poetic Edda.

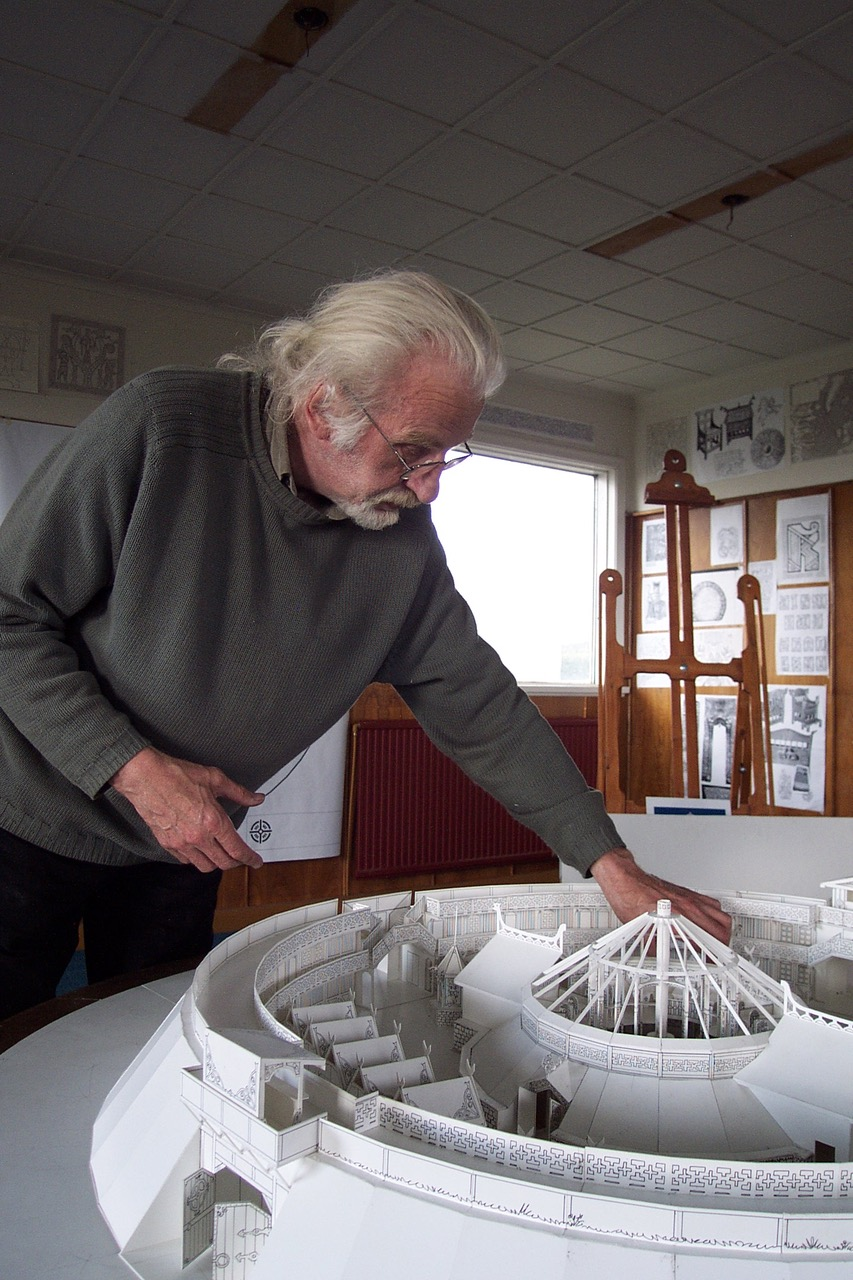
Haukur Halldórsson adjusting a model of a Viking village (2002)

== Yggdrasil Divination Deck ==
Among his notable works are his illustrations for the Yggdrasil Divination Deck. that he worked on with his daughter Gunnhildur Hauksdóttir and which draws from Norse mythology. It was published in 2019 by Llewellyn Worldwide.

== Board Games ==
From early age, he had a keen interest in board games and through the years designed and published several of them, He designed the board game Útvegsspilið and co-published it together with Tómas Tómasson and Jón Jónsson. In the game, players compete by earning money in the fishing industry. The game became a big success in Iceland and paved the way for Rallyspilið, Dýraspilið and Astróspilið which he designed with Einar Þorsteinn Ásgeirsson. He created custom chess pieces based on the Tupilaq, native myths from Greenland.

== Illustrated works ==
- Steinn Bollason: ævintýri frá Rúmeníu, by Hólmfríður Knudsen (1967)
- Íslenzk frímerki í 100 ár(1977)
- Útvegsspilið (1977)
- Á förnum vegi: umferðarleiðbeiningar handa 7–9 ára börnum, by Sigurður Pálsson (1979)
- Stóra barnabókin: sögur, ævintýri, ljóð, þulur, bænir, barnagælur, gátur, leikir, þrautir, föndur, by Jóhanna Thorsteinsson (1982)
- Tröll: sögur og teikningar úr íslenskri þjóđsagnaveröld, by Jón Árnason (1982)
- Íslenskir annalar, 1400–1449, by Anders Hansen (1983)
- Blautleg ljóð, by Skeið sf (1985)
- Í stjörnumyrkri, by Ari Gísli Bragason (1989)
- Reiðskólinn þinn: undirstöðuatriði reiðmennsku í máli og myndum, by Haukur Halldórsson (1991)
- Álfar, æsir og menn : fyrsti hluti, by Haukur Halldórsson (2008)
- Galdur og ættarmerki, by Haukur Halldórsson (2008)
- Tarot norðursins, by Haukur Halldórsson (2009)
- "Fóa og Fóa feykirófa: þjóðsaga", by Haukur Halldórsson, Nesti og nýir skór (2015)

=== English translations ===
- Some Icelandic recipes, by Elín Kristjánsdóttir (1973)
- One Hundred Years of Icelandic Stamps, (1977)
- Trolls in Icelandic folklore: stories and drawings, by Jón Árnason (1982)
- Elves, aesir and humans: first book, by Haukur Halldórsson (2008)
- Yggdrasil: Norse Divination Deck, by Haukur Halldórsson and Gunnhildur Hauksdóttir Publisher:Llewellyn Worldwide (2019)
