= Safnasafnid Icelandic Folk and Outsider Art Museum =

Icelandic art museum

Coordinates: 65.7491°N 18.0759°W

The Icelandic Folk and Outsider Art Museum
- Safnasafnið
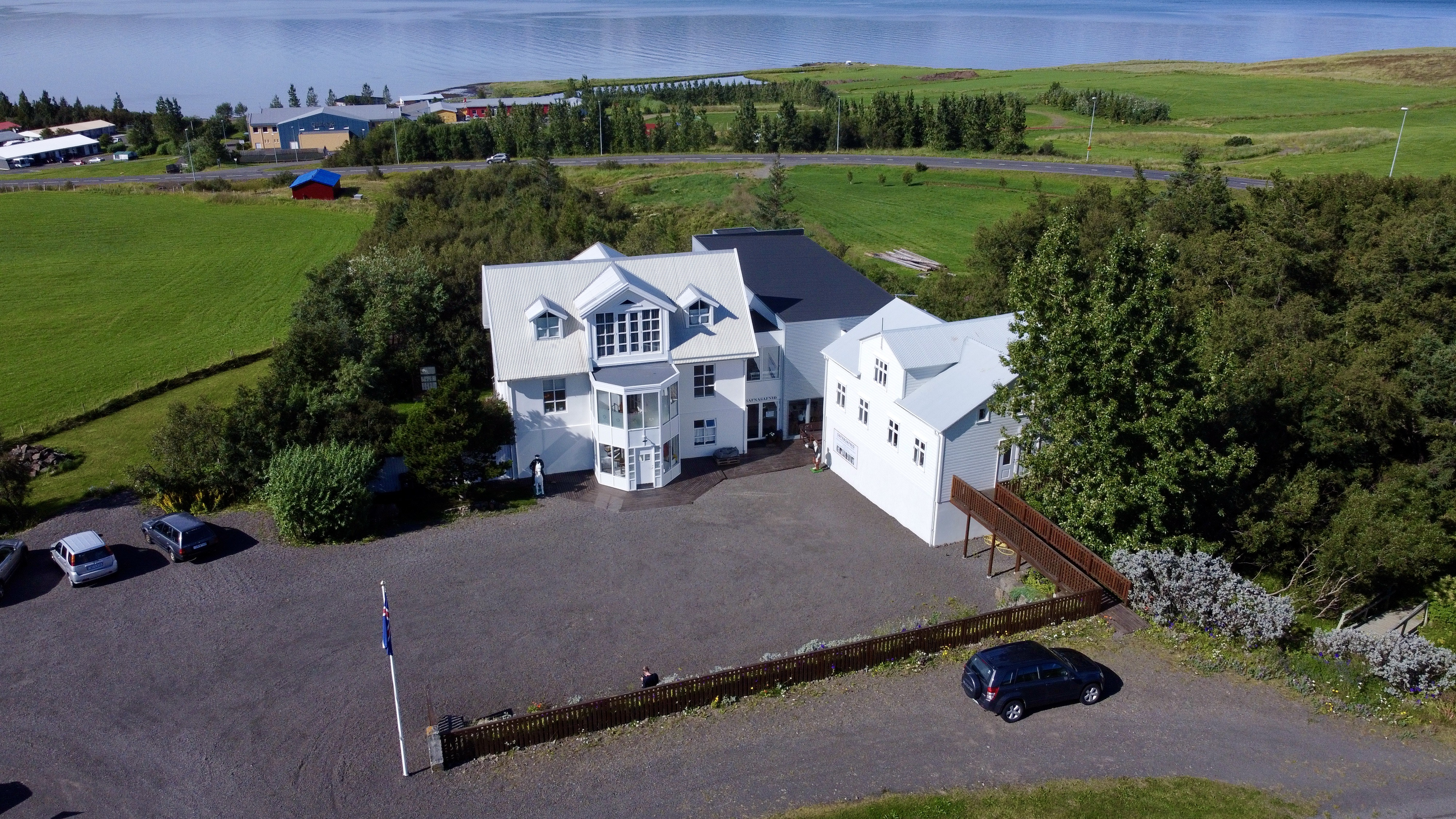
- Established: 1995
- Location: Svalbarðseyri, Iceland
- Type: Art museum, folk museum, outsider art museum
- Founders: Níels Hafstein and Magnhildur Sigurðardóttir
- Website: https://safnasafnid.is/

The Icelandic Folk and Outsider Art Museum (Safnasafnið in Icelandic) is a museum of folk and outsider art located outside Akureyri in northern Iceland. It was founded in 1995 by artist Níels Hafstein, and Magnhildur Sigurðardóttir, a retired psychiatric nurse.

== History ==
The museum is run by the co-founders Níels Hafstein, and his partner Magnhildur Sigurðardóttir along with a board. Its goal is to bring more attention to outsider and folk art, and crafts by taking it from the fringes of art appreciation to center stage. An important part of the museum's concept is to combine its collection of art made by autistic artists and exhibit them alongside progressive contemporary art in an annual summer exhibition. The museum is situated in a former school building, and a neighboring trading-post house, which are joined by a modern extension built in 2007.

== Collection and archives ==
The museum actively collects, preserves and researches outsider, and folk arts and crafts as well as contemporary fine art and is a member of the European Outsider Art Association The collection holds around 150.000 items and art pieces made by over 300 self-taught and trained artists, ranging from the 19th century to the present day. The collection consists mostly of works by Icelandic artists with notable exceptions of Pieter Holstein and Dieter Roth. Most of the collection is registered in SARPUR, the official museum collection database of Iceland.

== Publications and research ==
The museum started publishing its catalogs in 2016 and had published nine books by the end of 2022. Most of them revolve around research based on the annual exhibition theme or studies of individual artists. In this way, the museum showcases its collection, while making contributions to the otherwise mostly undocumented history of Icelandic folk and outsider art. The catalogs are written in the native Icelandic language.
