= Kolaportið =

Flea market in Reykjavík, Iceland

Coordinates: 64°08′56″N 21°56′19″W

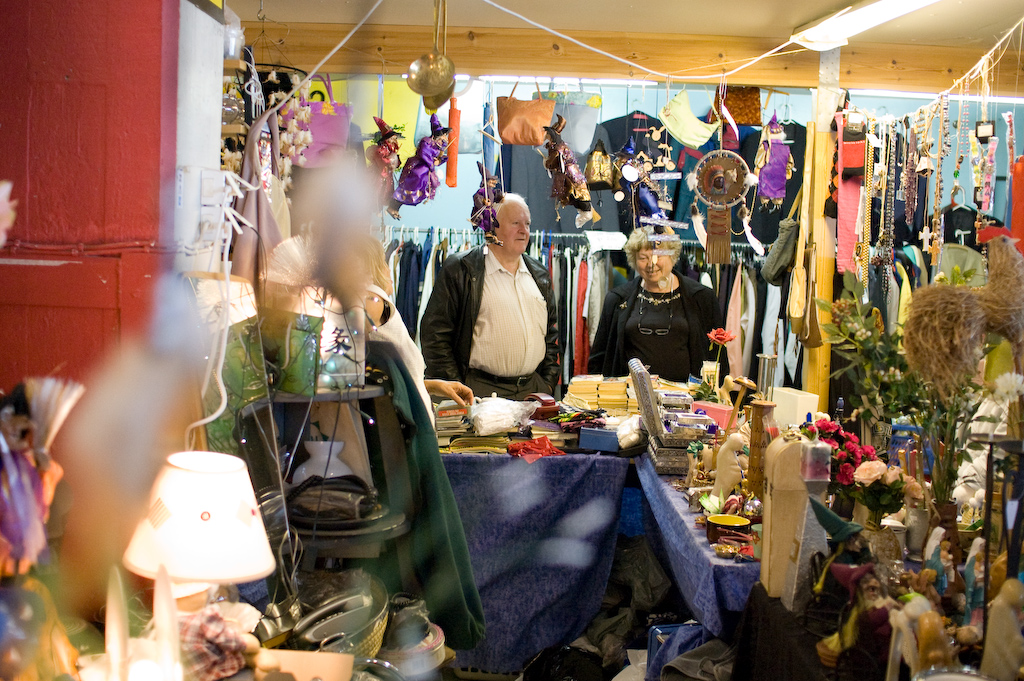
Kolaportið

Kolaportið is Iceland's only flea market. It takes place indoors in the old Customs building, close to the harbour of the capital city, Reykjavík.

Goods sold include second-hand records, liquorice, clothing, antiques, and books. In the food section, fishmongers sell fermented shark, dried cod, pickled herring, and whale meat. There are also bread and sandwiches for sale.

Kolaportið is normally open only during weekends.

It opened in 1989, in the city parking garage under a bank building. In 1994, it moved into the Customs House. In 2024, the City of Reykjavik decided to move the University of the Arts into that facility, necessitating a "Search for new facilities for a public market in the center of Reykjavík." Unable to find a suitable new location, it was extended to at least March 2025.
