= Allsherjargoði (Ásatrúarfélagið) =

Religious leader of the Icelandic Ásatrúarfélagið community

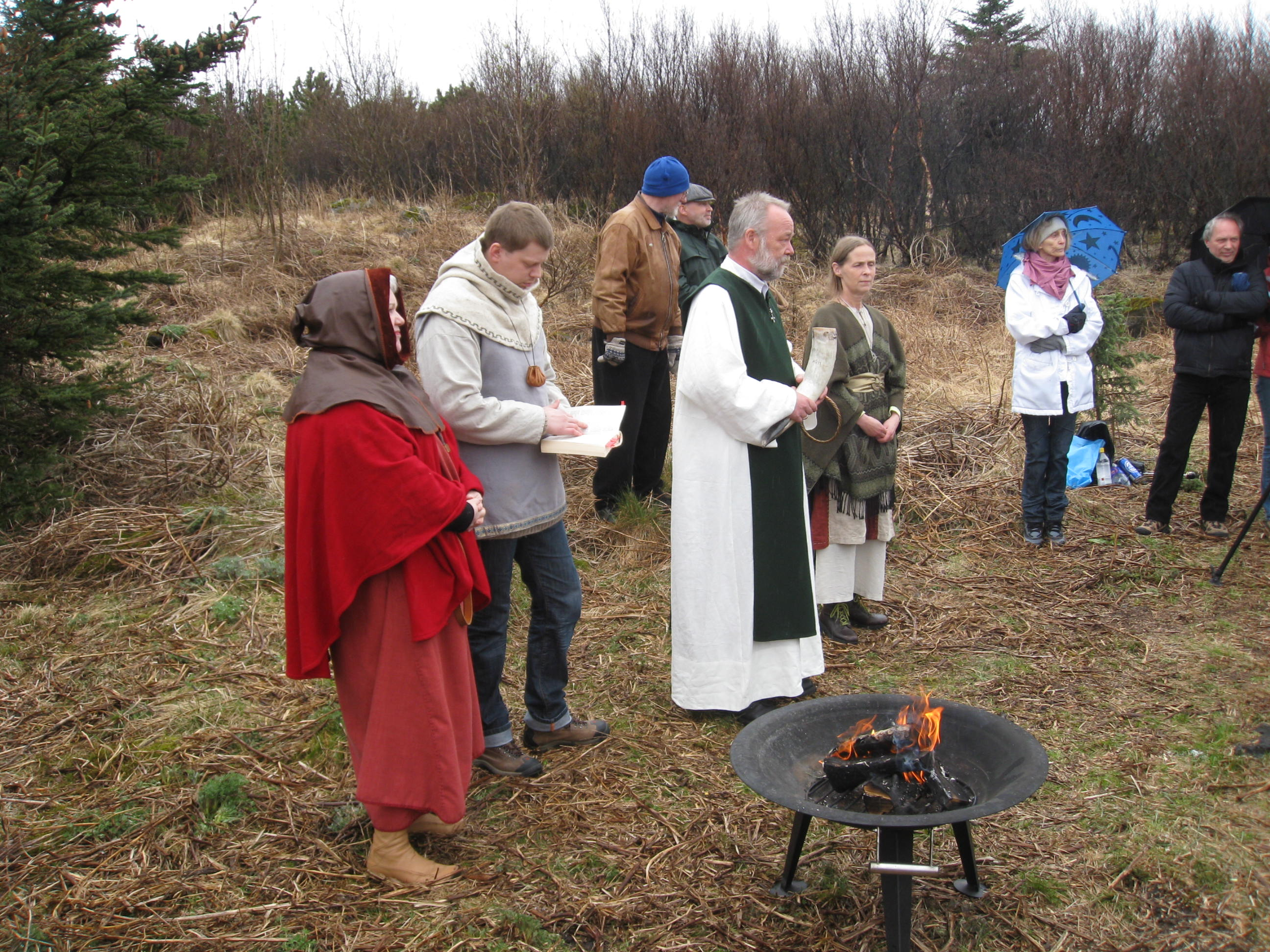
Hilmar Örn Hilmarsson, here with a drinking horn and a ceremonial ring during a blót, is the allsherjargoði since 2003.

The allsherjargoði (Icelandic pronunciation: [ˈalsˌhɛrjarˌkɔðɪ]; plural -goðar) is the chief religious official of the Icelandic neopagan organization Ásatrúarfélagið in Iceland. Office holders are elected.

== Historical background ==
The title is a modern adoption of the medieval political title allsherjargoði which was in use during the Icelandic Commonwealth from 930 to 1262. A goði was a local political leader, and allsherjargoði can be translated as "all-people chieftain". The original title was held by the goði who held the goðorð (an administrative division) of the descendants of Ingólfr Arnarson, the first settler of Iceland. The role of the allsherjargoði was to sanctify the Althing as it began every year.

== Elections ==
When Ásatrúarfélagið was founded in 1972, this historical Icelandic title was chosen for the chief official of the organization. Shortly after establishing the organization on the First Day of Summer of 1972, the founding members chose the poet and farmer Sveinbjörn Beinteinsson as the first holder of the title.

Sveinbjörn remained in office until his death in 1993. An election for a new allsherjargoði was then held in 1994. The two candidates were the founding member Jörmundur Ingi Hansen, who ran on a platform of continuity, and the artist Haukur Halldórsson, who promised more innovation. Jörmundur Ingi won with 59 votes against 34; one vote was blank.

In 2002, dissatisfaction with Jörmundur Ingi's way of running the organization resulted in his removal from office and he was replaced by Jónína Kristín Berg as a temporary allsherjargoði. A regular election was held the following year and the musician Hilmar Örn Hilmarsson was chosen, with Jörmundur Ingi's approval.

== List of allsherjargoðar ==
Image	From	To	Name
	1972	1993	Sveinbjörn Beinteinsson
	1994	2002	Jörmundur Ingi Hansen
	2002	2003	Jónína Kristín Berg
	2003		Hilmar Örn Hilmarsson
