= Kata Kovács and Tom O'Doherty =

Hungarian-Irish artist duo

Kata Kovács and Tom O’Doherty
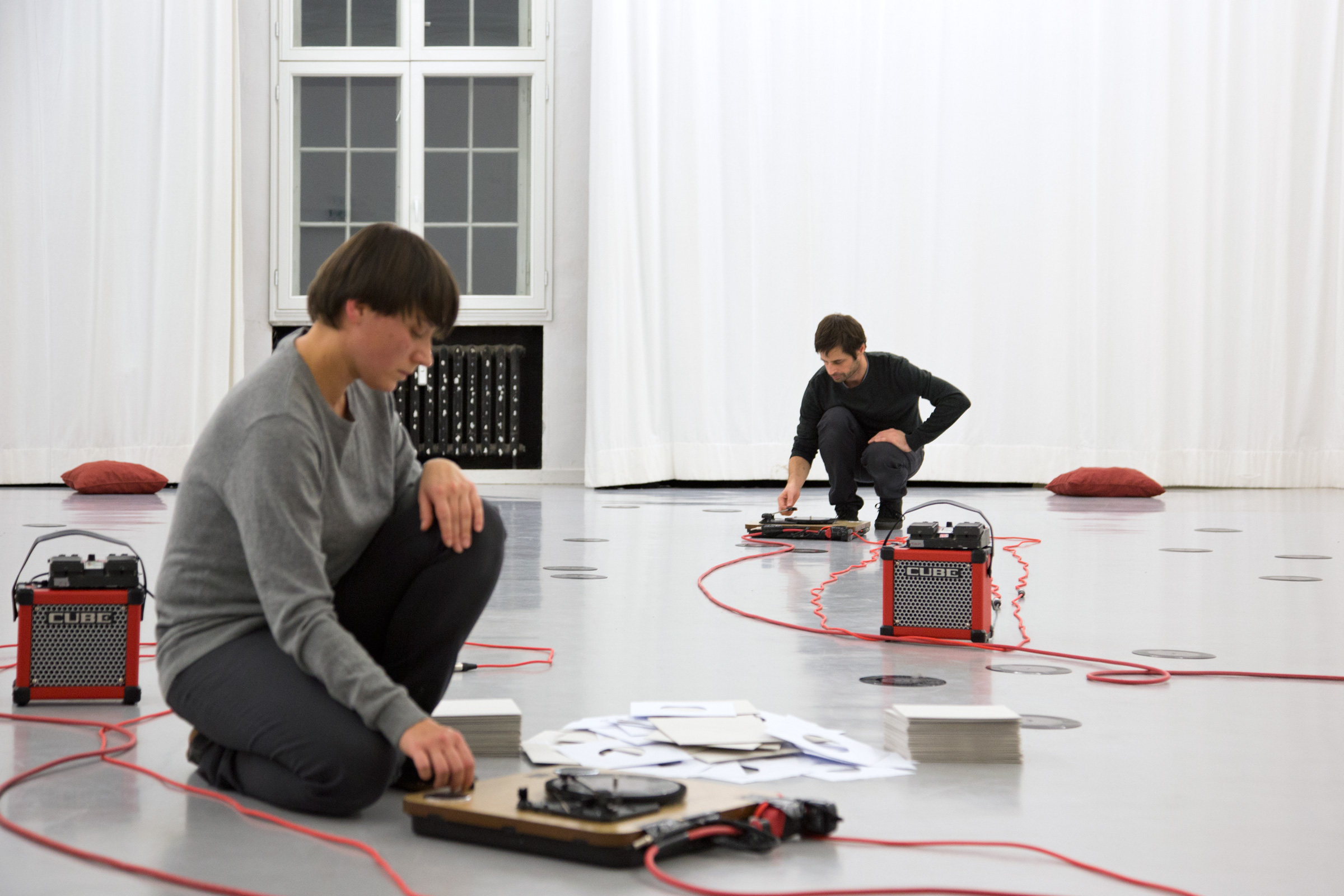
- Kata Kovács and Tom O’Doherty, Künstlerhaus Bethanien, October 2017
- Years active: 2011–present
- Notable work: Signal Tide, Minute/Year
- Movement: Post-conceptual, durational, sound art, process art
- Website: kkto.net

Kata Kovács and Tom O’Doherty (often also referred to by the stylised abbreviation KKTO) are an artist duo, primarily known for working with sound and duration. They live and work in Berlin, Germany.

== About ==
Kata Kovács is originally from Kecskemét, Hungary, and studied dance in Budapest; Tom O’Doherty is originally from Dublin, Ireland, where he studied literature. After meeting in Berlin, they began to work together in 2011. Their initial collaborations were on a series of performances involving the acoustic traces created by movement scores, which were presented at Sophiensæle, ausland, Uferstudios, Montag Modus, and other venues in the city. Their work has subsequently been presented at Los Angeles County Museum of Art, Serralves Museum, MNAC Chiado, Ars Electronica, Casino Luxembourg, and Issue Project Room, among others.

The duo's work incorporates elements of durational and time-based art, minimalist movement, and electroacoustic music and sound. They assert a curiosity about “processes, sounds, and movements that come close to imperceptibility, and the ways in which this material can be transformed through repetition, patterning, layering, and archiving.”

== Notable works ==
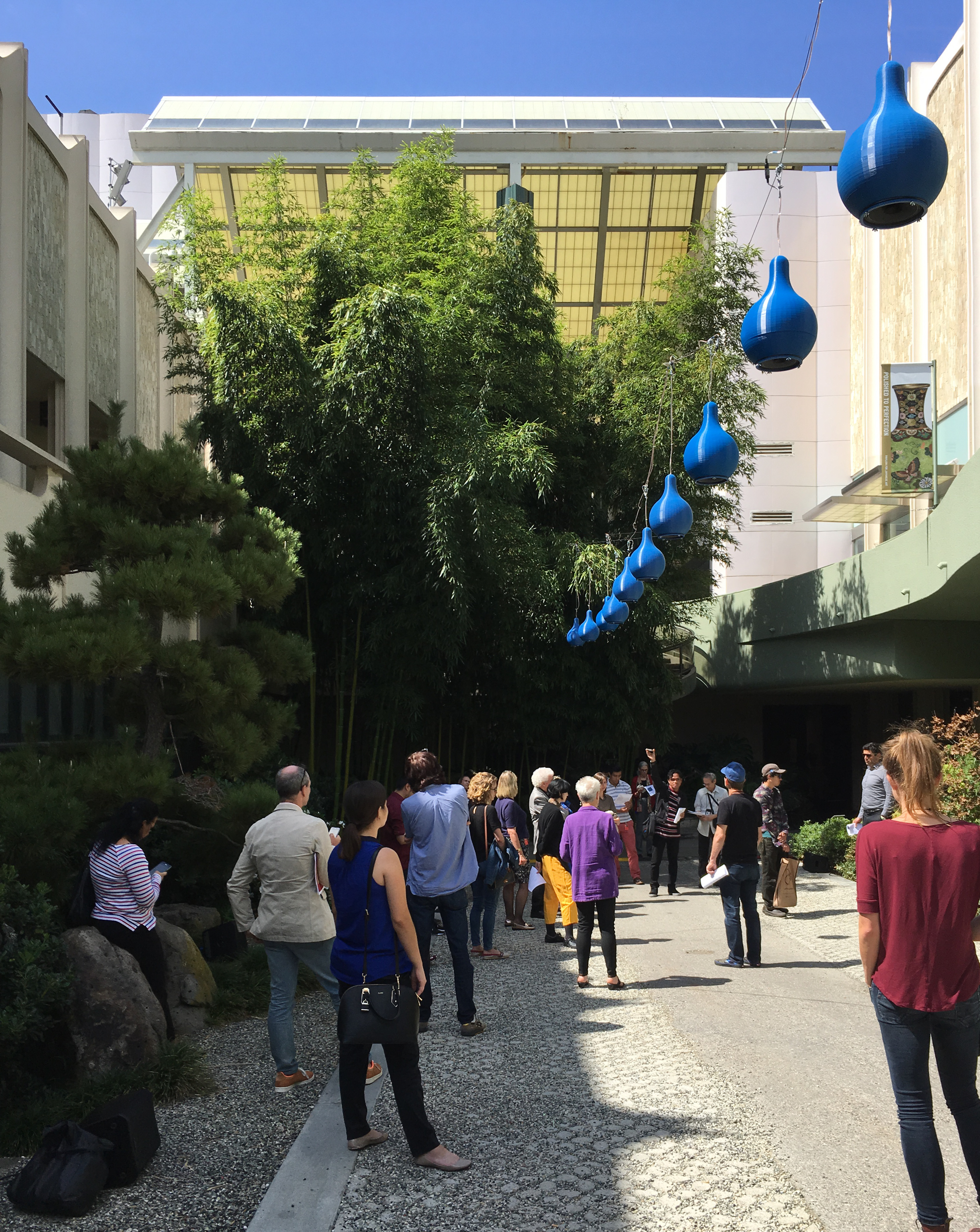
Signal Tide at LACMA, September 2017

In 2017, the duo presented the “sound and extraterrestrial radio installation,” Signal Tide, at LACMA, Los Angeles. This work, which was undertaken in collaboration with David Bryant of Godspeed You! Black Emperor, involved receiving live signals from an abandoned satellite, the LES-1, as it orbited the earth above the site of the work, and combining the sound produced from these transmissions with music derived from sacred harp singing. The work was presented outdoors, beside the museum's Pavilion for Japanese Art, and was centered around a line of custom-made overhead speakers. The work became ‘activated’ every three hours — the time it took for the satellite to orbit the earth and return to the sky above Los Angeles. An audio piece based on the work was subsequently commissioned by the museum as part of their LACMA@home series in 2020.

In 2016, Kata Kovács and Tom O’Doherty began their long-durational installation work, Minute/Year. This automated work produces a one-minute-long audio recording every day, with each recording acoustically layered over the one which has preceded it, in a process which has been ongoing for over eight years to date. The work alters location every year, and in 2024 it is located in Olin Library at Wesleyan University. The first seven years of the work were presented at a retrospective at Halfsister Berlin in 2023.

The 2016 work, Afterglow, was presented as part of the closing event for Digital in Berlin's Kiezsalon series at Musikbrauerei. The work was an installation in which all the concerts in the 2016 Kiezsalon series were recorded, and then replayed in overlapping fragments, in the giant basement space of the Musikbrauerei, “evoking recognisable parts of past events, now juxtaposed with each other and situated in a radically different environment.” The work included excerpts from live performances by Christina Vantzou, Laraaji, Janek Schaefer, and others.

== Other activities ==
Kata Kovács and Tom O’Doherty are represented by Hošek Contemporary. Both are also active in other musical and artistic collaborations: Kata Kovács is a member of the improvisation ensemble Vrouw, Tom O’Doherty has worked with Paula Matthusen and has exhibited photography. Both were members of Fake Company with Kathleen Hermesdorf.
