= Öskjuhlíð =

Hill in Reykjavík, Iceland

Coordinates: 64.128754°N 21.918712°W

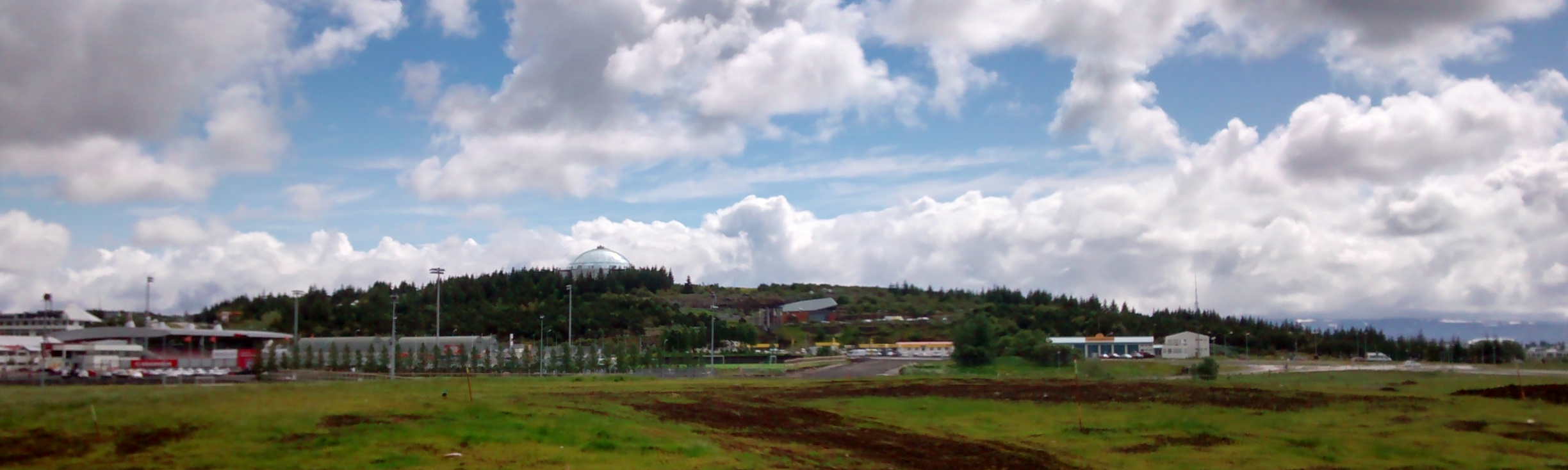
Öskjuhlíð

Öskjuhlíð (Icelandic pronunciation: [ˈœscʏˌl̥iːθ]) is a hill in the centre of Reykjavík, Iceland. It is 61 metres (200 ft) above sea level. The hill is a designated outdoors area and is covered with trees. At the top of the hill stands Perlan, a landmark building set on top of six water tanks. It is a city landmark built during Davíð Oddsson's period as mayor.

During the Second World War the United States Army occupation force built various bunkers on the hill.

Hof Ásatrúarfélagsins, a neopagan building, is being built on the southern slope of the hill.
