= Allsherjargoði =

Icelandic Commonwealth parliamentary role

Allsherjargoði (Icelandic pronunciation: [ˈalsˌhɛrjarˌkɔːðɪ], All-People Chieftain; plural -goðar [-ˌkɔːðar̥]) was an office in the Icelandic Commonwealth, held by the goði who held the goðorð of the descendants of Ingólfr Arnarson, the first settler of Iceland. The role of the allsherjargoði was to sanctify the Althing as it began every year.

Þorsteinn Ingólfsson, son of Ingólfr Arnarson, was a goði when the Althing was founded in 930 and became the first allsherjargoði. His son, Þorkell máni Þorsteinsson, inherited the office ca. 945 while at the same time being lawspeaker. He was succeeded by his son Þormóðr Þorkelsson, who held office from 984 to 1020. His son, Hamall Þormóðsson held office until 1055. Hamall had three sons, Þormóðr, Torfi and Már but it is not known who of the three inherited the office and for the following century it is not known who held the office. In 1160, Guðmundr gríss Ámundason, presumably a descendant of Hamall, was in office as allsherjargoði. He held the office until his death in 1197 when his son, Magnús góði Guðmundarson, took over. Magnús held office until 1234. He had no sons and it is unknown who inherited the office after this. One theory holds that Árni óreiða Magnússon, nephew of Guðmundr gríss and son-in-law of Snorri Sturluson, inherited the office and became the last allsherjargoði. The Icelandic Commonwealth came to an end in 1262 when the goðar pledged fealty to the Norwegian king.

== List of allsherjargoðar ==
From	To	Name
Office created in 930
c. 930	c. 945	Þorsteinn Ingólfsson
c. 945	984	Þorkell máni Þorsteinsson
984	1020	Þormóðr Þorkelsson
1020	1055	Hamall Þormóðsson
1055	1160	unknown
fl. 1160		Guðmundr gríss Ámundason
1160	1197	unknown
1197	1234	Magnús góði Guðmundarson
1234	1262	unknown
Office abolished in 1262

Years may be approximate.

== See also ==
- Allsherjargoði (Ásatrúarfélagið)

== Literature ==
- Gunnar Karlsson, Goðamenning. Investigation of the role of the goðar (chieftains) in the Old Commonwealth period. ISBN 9979-3-2553-4. ISK 4990. (2004)
