= Helgi Pjeturss =

Icelandic geologist, philosopher and spiritualist (1872-1949)

Helgi Pjeturss (31 March 1872 – 28 January 1949) was an Icelandic geologist, philosopher, and spiritualist.

In 1905 he became the first Icelander to graduate with a PhD in geology. He conducted extensive research on the geology of Iceland from 1898 to 1910. In 1919, Helgi started publishing Nýall, a collection of essays outlining his theories on what he referred to as astrobiology. Having conducted research on psychic phenomena, Helgi disagreed with spiritualism on several points. Most centrally, he held that the spirits contacted in séances and in dreams were not immaterial beings but material beings living on other planets. The influences on Helgi's work included spiritualism, theosophy, Icelandic nationalism, medieval Icelandic literature, and Ariosophy.

After Helgi's death a society called Félag Nýalssinna was founded, with the purpose of promoting Helgi's philosophy. A book documenting his travels was released in 1959.
