= List of songs recorded by Björk =

Songs recorded by Björk
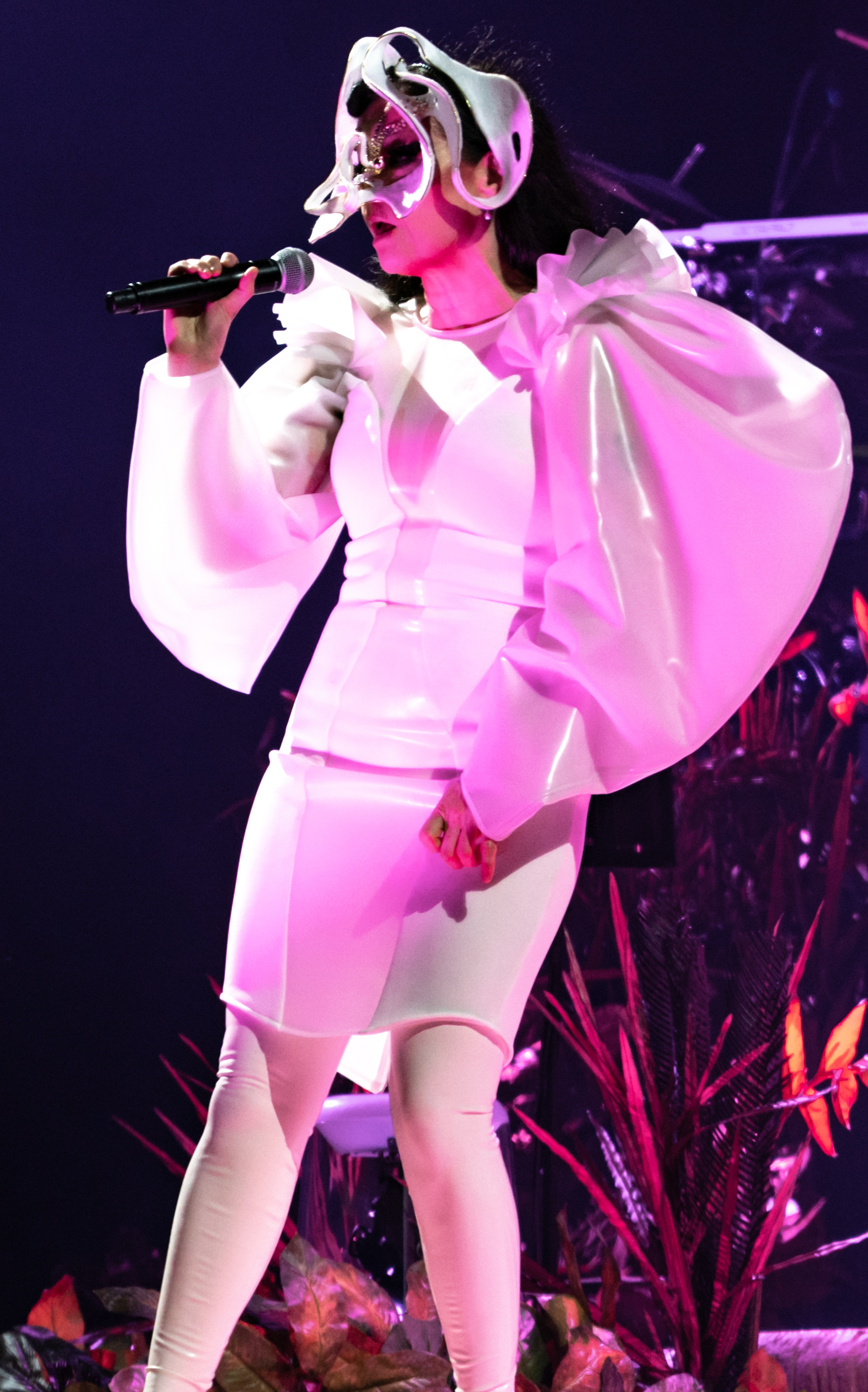
- Björk performing in Victoria Park, London during her Utopia tour (2018)
- Songs: 228
- Other contributions: 64

Icelandic singer and songwriter Björk has recorded more than two hundred songs for ten studio albums, two soundtrack albums, a compilation album, six remix albums and three collaboration albums. She is the sole writer and producer of most of the songs included in her albums. She also sometimes plays instruments during her recording sessions. Moreover, she has provided credited and uncredited contributions on songs recorded by other artists, including background vocals, songwriting, remixing and production.

After enrolling at the Barnamúsíkskóli in Reykjavík, she started developing an interest in writing and performing. A live recording of her rendition of Tina Charles' 1976 song "I Love to Love", sung when she was 10 years old, led to the signing of a record deal with Fálkinn. Her first eponymous solo release (1977), nowadays considered juvenilia, consisted of cover songs. Nonetheless, the album included her first composition, "Jóhannes Kjarval". Thereafter, Björk ventured into music bands experiences, singing as the lead voice of groups like Tappi Tíkarrass, Kukl, the Elgar Sisters and, most notably, the Sugarcubes. While recording with the Sugarcubes, Björk appeared as a background vocalist for fellow artists like Megas, Current 93 and Bless, and some of her original music was included in local music compilations. In 1990 she released Gling-Gló alongside Tríó Guðmundar Ingólfssonar, a cover album of jazz standards.

In 1993, after departing from The Sugarcubes, Björk released her first solo album, Debut, which propelled her to international stardom. The album was followed by a series of critically acclaimed recordings, including Post (1995), Homogenic (1997), Vespertine (2001), Medúlla (2004), Volta (2007), Biophilia (2011), Vulnicura (2015), Utopia (2017), and Fossora (2022). All of her albums were released under One Little Independent Records. Björk has collaborated with a number of artists and songwriters throughout her career, including Nellee Hooper, Sjón, Mark Bell, Anohni and Arca.

Björk's recorded output also encompasses songs recorded for motion pictures. She has composed theme songs for The Young Americans (1993), Anton (1996), Being John Malkovich (1999), Með mann á bakinu (2004), Hot Chocolate (2005) and Moomins and the Comet Chase (2010). Most notably, she created the soundtrack for Dancer in the Dark (2000), directed by Lars von Trier, while also acting as the main protagonist in the film itself, a role which gained her the Best Actress Award at the 53rd Cannes Film Festival, whereas her song "I've Seen It All" received a nomination at the 73rd Academy Awards for Best Original Song. Björk reprised double duty as main actress and composer for Matthew Barney's Drawing Restraint 9, for which she recorded an eponymous soundtrack (2005). Her latest contribution for a film is recording background vocals for The Northman soundtrack, her fourth feature movie role.

During the course of her career, Björk's songs and compositions were nominated for several music awards. She has received five BRIT Awards, four MTV Video Music Awards, one Academy Award nomination, and sixteen Grammy Awards nominations. In 2010, the Royal Swedish Academy of Music awarded her with the prestigious Polar Music Prize, considered the equivalent of the "Nobel Prize of Music" in Sweden, praising "her deeply personal music and lyrics, her precise arrangements and her unique voice". In 2017, Björk released her first song book, titled 34 Scores for Piano, Organ, Harpsichord and Celeste, which features a selection of arrangements for songs belonging to her catalogue.

== Songs ==
Key
| † | Indicates single release |
| ‡ | Indicates promotional single release |
| # | Indicates single release as a featured artist |
| § | Indicates songs unreleased in a commercial form |

Name of song, performing artists, writers, originating albums, and year released.
| Song | Artist(s) | Writer(s) | Producer(s) | Album(s) | Year | Ref(s). |
|---|---|---|---|---|---|---|
| "107 Steps" (Note: The film version of "107 Steps", included in Dancer in the Dark (2000), is called "141 Steps".) | Björk with Siobhan Fallon | Björk; Sjón; Lars von Trier | Björk; Mark Bell | Selmasongs | 2000 | |
| "5 Years" | Björk | Björk | Björk; Mark Bell | Homogenic | 1997 | |
| "Aeroplane" | Björk | Björk | Nellee Hooper | Debut | 1993 | |
| "Afi" | Björgvin Gíslason featuring Björk Guðmundsdóttir | Björgvin Gíslason; Bjartmar Guđlaugsson | Björgvin Gíslason | Örugglega | 1983 | |
| "Afterwards" (Note: In "Afterwards", Björk sings portions of "Anoche cuando dormía", a poem by Spanish author Antonio Machado. The poem was included in Soledades, galerías y otros poemas (1907).) | Arca featuring Björk | Arca; Björk; Antonio Machado | Arca | KiCk i | 2020 | |
| "Alarm Call" † | Björk | Björk | Björk; Mark Bell | Homogenic | 1997 | |
| "Álfur Út Ur Hól" (Note: "Álfur Út Ur Hól" is the Icelandic version of "The Fool on the Hill", originally performed by The Beatles, and included on Magical Mystery Tour (1967).) | Björk Guðmundsdóttir | John Lennon; Paul McCartney; Björgvin Hólm | Pálmi Gunnarsson; Sigurður Karlsson; Tony Cook | Björk | 1977 | |
| "All Is Full of Love" † | Björk | Björk | Howie B Björk (Note: The album version was billed as "Howie Version" or "Strings Mix" and was produced only by Howie B. The single version was produced only by Björk.) | Homogenic | 1997 | |
| "All Neon Like" | Björk | Björk | Björk; Mark Bell | Homogenic | 1997 | |
| "All We Are" (Note: The songs included in Mount Wittenberg Orca are all credited to Björk and the Dirty Projectors. Nonetheless, Björk's vocals are only featured on "On and Ever Onward", "Sharing Orb" and "All We Are".) | Björk with Dirty Projectors | David Longstreth | David Longstreth | Mount Wittenberg Orca | 2010 | |
| "Allow" | Björk featuring Emilie Nicolas | Björk; Emilie Nicolas | Björk | Fossora | 2022 | |
| "Alta Mira" (Note: "Alta Mira" is an Icelandic cover version of "Alta Mira" by Edgar Winter, originally included on They Only Come Out at Night (1972).) | Björk Guðmundsdóttir | Edgar Winter; Björgvin Hólm | Pálmi Gunnarsson; Sigurður Karlsson; Tony Cook | Björk | 1977 | |
| "Ambergris March" | Björk | Björk | Björk; Mark Bell; Valgeir Sigurðsson | Drawing Restraint 9 | 2005 | |
| "Amphibian" (Note: "Amphibian" was originally recorded for the soundtrack of Being John Malkovich (1999). The song was later included as a b-side in the single release of "Cocoon" in 2002.) | Björk | Björk | Björk; Valgeir Sigurðsson; Mark Bell | Being John Malkovich "Cocoon" | 1999; 2002 | |
| "An Echo, a Stain" | Björk | Björk; Guy Sigsworth | Björk | Vespertine | 2001 | |
| "Ancestors" (Note: "Ancestors" includes throat singing by Tagaq.) | Björk | Björk; Tagaq | Björk | Medúlla | 2004 | |
| "Ancestress" † (Note: The first pressing vinyl version of "Ancestress" doesn't feature vocals from Sindri Eldon.) | Björk featuring Sindri Eldon | Björk | Björk | Fossora | 2022 | |
| "Antarctic Return" | Björk | Björk | Björk | Drawing Restraint 9 | 2005 | |
| "Arabadrengurinn" | Björk Guðmundsdóttir | Sævar Árnason; Björgvin Hólm | Pálmi Gunnarsson; Sigurður Karlsson; Tony Cook | Björk | 1977 | |
| "Arisen My Senses" † (Note: "Arisen My Senses" interpolates "Little Now a Lot", a track by Arca included in her debut EP Baron Libre (2012).) | Björk | Björk; Arca | Björk; Arca | Utopia | 2017 | |
| "Army of Me" † (Note: A remix version of "Army of Me" features British band Skunk Anansie.) | Björk | Björk; Graham Massey | Björk; Graham Massey; Nellee Hooper | Post | 1995 | |
| "Arpeggio" | Björk | Björk | Björk | Utopia (Bird Call Boxset USB edition) | 2019 | |
| "Ástartöfrar" | Björk Guðmundsdóttir with Tríó Guðmundar Ingólfssonar | Valdimar Auðunsson | Tómas Magnús Tómasson | Gling-Gló | 1990 | |
| "Atlantic" | Björk | Björk | Björk | "Human Behaviour" | 1993 | |
| "Atom Dance" | Björk with Anohni | Björk; Oddný Eir Ævarsdóttir | Björk; Arca | Vulnicura | 2015 | |
| "Atopos" † | Björk featuring Kasimyn | Björk; Kasimyn | Björk | Fossora | 2022 | |
| "Aurora" | Björk | Björk | Björk | Vespertine | 2001 | |
| "Bachelorette" † | Björk | Björk; Sjón | Björk | Homogenic | 1997 | |
| "Bænin" (Note: "Bænin" is the Icelandic cover version of "Christopher Robin", originally performed by Melanie Safka, and included on Born to Be (1968).) | Björk Guðmundsdóttir | Melanie Safka; Kolbrún Jónsdóttir | Pálmi Gunnarsson; Sigurður Karlsson; Tony Cook | Björk | 1977 | |
| "Batabid" | Björk | Björk | Björk | "Pagan Poetry" | 2001 | |
| "Bath" (Note: "Bath" interpolates "Aposiopesis", a track by Akira Rabelais, included in Eisoptrophobia (2001).) | Björk | Björk; Akira Rabelais | Björk | Drawing Restraint 9 | 2005 | |
| "Beautiful Mother" | Björk with Dirty Projectors | David Longstreth | David Longstreth | Mount Wittenberg Orca | 2010 | |
| "Bella Símamær" | Björk Guðmundsdóttir with Tríó Guðmundar Ingólfssonar | Mark Fontenoy; Loftur Guðmundsson | Tómas Magnús Tómasson | Gling-Gló | 1990 | |
| "Berghain" # | Rosalía, Björk and Yves Tumor | Rosalía; Björk; Noah Goldstein; Jake Miller; Dylan Wiggins | Rosalía; Noah Goldstein; Jake Miller; Dylan Wiggins | Lux | 2025 | |
| "Big Time Sensuality" † | Björk | Björk; Nellee Hooper | Nellee Hooper | Debut | 1993 | |
| "Bílavísur" (Note: "Bílavísur" is an Icelandic reworded version of "The Blacksmith Blues", originally performed by Ella Mae Morse in 1952.) | Björk Guðmundsdóttir with Tríó Guðmundar Ingólfssonar | Jack Holmes; Jón Sigurðsson | Tómas Magnús Tómasson | Gling-Gló | 1990 | |
| "Black Lake" | Björk | Björk | Björk; Arca | Vulnicura | 2015 | |
| "Blissing Me" † (Note: A remix version of "Blissing Me" features American artist Serpentwithfeet.) (Note: The segue between "Blissing Me" and "The Gate" on Utopia contains a sample from "Guanare/Barinas" by Jean C. Roché.) | Björk | Björk | Björk; Arca | Utopia | 2017 | |
| "Body Memory" | Björk | Björk | Björk; Arca | Utopia | 2017 | |
| "Borealis" | Jlin featuring Björk | Jerrilynn Patton; Björk | Jerrilynn Patton | Akoma | 2024 | |
| "Börnin Viđ Tjörnina" | Björk Guðmundsdóttir with Tríó Guðmundar Ingólfssonar | Jenni Jónsson | Tómas Magnús Tómasson | Gling-Gló | 1990 | |
| "Brestir Og Brak" | Björk Guðmundsdóttir with Tríó Guðmundar Ingólfssonar | Jón Múli Árnason; Jónas Árnason | Tómas Magnús Tómasson | Gling-Gló | 1990 | |
| "Búkolla" (Note: "Búkolla" is an Icelandic cover version of "Your Kiss Is Sweet", originally performed by Syreeta Wright and included in her album Stevie Wonder Presents: Syreeta (1974).) | Björk Guðmundsdóttir | Stevie Wonder; Syreeta Wright; Björgvin Hólm | Pálmi Gunnarsson; Sigurður Karlsson; Tony Cook | Björk | 1977 | |
| "Cetacea" | Björk | Björk; Matthew Barney | Björk | Drawing Restraint 9 | 2005 | |
| "Charlene" | Björk | Björk; Ken Downie; Ed Handley; Andy Turner | Björk; Nellee Hooper | "Isobel" | 1995 | |
| "Claimstaker" | Björk | Björk; Arca | Björk; Arca | Utopia | 2017 | |
| "Cocoon" † | Björk | Björk; Thomas Knak | Björk; Thomas Knak | Vespertine | 2001 | |
| "Come to Me" | Björk | Björk | Nellee Hooper | Debut | 1993 | |
| "Cosmogony" † | Björk | Björk; Sjón | Björk | Biophilia | 2011 | |
| "Courtship" (Note: "Courtship" includes an original recording by Ragnar Johnson, assisted by Jessica Mayer, called "Mo-Mo", included in Sacred Flute Music From New Guinea: Madang / Windim Mabu (2016).) | Björk | Björk | Björk; Arca | Utopia | 2017 | |
| "Cover Me" | Björk | Björk | Björk | Post | 1995 | |
| "Crying" | Björk | Björk; Nellee Hooper | Nellee Hooper | Debut | 1993 | |
| "Crystalline" † | Björk | Björk | Björk; 16bit | Biophilia | 2011 | |
| "Cvalda" | Björk with Catherine Deneuve | Björk; Mark Bell; Sjón; Lars von Trier | Björk; Mark Bell | Selmasongs | 2000 | |
| "Dark Matter" | Björk | Björk; Mark Bell | Björk | Biophilia | 2011 | |
| "Declare Independence" † (Note: "Declare Independence" and "Vertebræ by Vertebræ" interpolate portions of "Hunter Vessel", included in Drawing Restraint 9 (2005).) | Björk | Björk; Mark Bell | Björk; Mark Bell | Volta | 2007 | |
| "Desired Constellation" | Björk | Björk; Olivier Alary | Björk | Medúlla | 2004 | |
| "Domestica" | Björk | Björk | Björk | "Pagan Poetry" | 2001 | |
| "Earth Intruders" † | Björk | Timbaland; Danja; Björk | Timbaland; Björk; Danja | Volta | 2007 | |
| "Ég Veit Ei Hvađ Skal Segja" (Note: "Ég Veit Ei Hvađ Skal Segja" is an Icelandic reworded version of "Ricochet", originally included in the 1954 film Ricochet Romance and famously sung by Teresa Brewer in 1953.) | Björk Guðmundsdóttir with Tríó Guðmundar Ingólfssonar | Larry Coleman; Joe Darion; Norman Gimbel; Loftur Guðmundsson | Tómas Magnús Tómasson | Gling-Gló | 1990 | |
| "Enjoy" | Björk | Björk; Tricky | Björk; Tricky | Post | 1995 | |
| "Fagurt Er í Fjörðum" | Björk | Látra-Björg | Björk | Fossora | 2022 | |
| "Family" | Björk | Björk; Arca | Björk; The Haxan Cloak; Arca | Vulnicura | 2015 | |
| "Features Creatures" † (Note: "Features Creatures" includes an original composition by Sarah Hopkins called Kindred Spirits, Music for Harmonic Whirlies (1996). Remix versions of the track include Fever Ray and The Knife and were included on Country Creatures (2019).) | Björk | Björk; Sarah Hopkins | Björk | Utopia | 2017 | |
| "Flétta" | Antony and the Johnsons featuring Björk | Anohni; Björk | Anohni | Swanlights | 2010 | |
| "Foot Soldier" | Björk | Björk; Mark Bell | Björk; Mark Bell | "Hidden Place" | 2001 | |
| "Fossora" † (Note: The first pressing vinyl version of "Fossora" features vocals from Gabber Modus Operandi vocalist Ican Harem.) | Björk featuring Kasimyn | Björk; Kasimyn | Björk | Fossora | 2022 | |
| "Freefall" | Björk | Björk | Björk | Fossora | 2022 | |
| "Frosti" | Björk | Björk | Björk | Vespertine | 2001 | |
| "Fungal City" | Björk featuring Serpentwithfeet | Björk | Björk | Fossora | 2022 | |
| "Fúsi Hreindýr" | Björk Guðmundsdóttir | Björgvin Gíslason; Björgvin Hólm | Pálmi Gunnarsson; Sigurður Karlsson; Tony Cook | Björk | 1977 | |
| "Future Forever" | Björk | Björk; Arca | Björk; Arca | Utopia | 2017 | |
| "Generous Palmstroke" | Björk | Björk; Zeena Parkins | Björk; Marius de Vries | "Hidden Place" | 2001 | |
| "Gling Gló" | Björk Guðmundsdóttir with Tríó Guðmundar Ingólfssonar | Alfreð Clausen; Kristín Engilbertsdóttir | Tómas Magnús Tómasson | Gling-Gló | 1990 | |
| "Gloomy Sunday" § (Note: "Gloomy Sunday" is a song composed by Hungarian composer Rezső Seress and published in 1933. It was famously sung by Billie Holiday in 1941. The version included in Stormy Weather is a live rendition of the song, performed at the Stormy Weather event on 16 April 1998.) | Björk | Rezső Seress; Sam M. Lewis | Don Henley | Stormy Weather | 1998 | |
| "Glóra" | Björk | Björk | Björk | "Big Time Sensuality" | 1993 | |
| "Gotham Lullaby" (Note: "Gotham Lullaby" is a song composed by Meredith Monk and included in Dolmen Music (1981). The version included in Monk Mix is a live rendition of the song, performed with the Brodsky Quartet at the Union Chapel concerts in December, 1999.) | Björk with the Brodsky Quartet | Meredith Monk | Björk; Brodsky Quartet | Monk Mix: Remixes and Interpretations of Music by Meredith Monk | 2012 | |
| "Gratitude" (Note: "Gratitude" includes vocals by Bonnie 'Prince' Billy, credited as Will Oldham.) | Björk | Björk; Matthew Barney | Björk | Drawing Restraint 9 | 2005 | |
| "Harm of Will" | Björk | Björk; Guy Sigsworth; Harmony Korine | Björk | Vespertine | 2001 | |
| "Headphones" | Björk | Björk; Tricky | Björk; Tricky | Post | 1995 | |
| "Heirloom" (Note: The "Heirloom" instrumental was released as "Crabcraft" by Console in his 1998 album Rocket in the Pocket, although the track was reportedly re-produced from scratch with Björk.) | Björk | Björk; Console | Björk; Console | Vespertine | 2001 | |
| "Her Mother's House" (Note: The first pressing vinyl version of "Her Mother's House" doesn't feature vocals from Ísadóra Bjarkardóttir Barney.) | Björk featuring Ísadóra Bjarkardóttir Barney | Björk; Ísadóra Bjarkardóttir Barney | Björk | Fossora | 2022 | |
| "Hidden Place" † (Note: Hidden Place samples Transfigured Night, Op.4 (1899) by Arnold Schoenberg.) | Björk | Björk; Guy Sigsworth; Mark Bell (Note: On the Vespertine liner notes, Björk is credited as the sole songwriter for the song. On its subsequent inclusion on Greatest Hits (2002), Sigsworth and Bell are credited alongside Björk.) | Björk | Vespertine | 2001 | |
| "Himnaför" | Björk Guðmundsdóttir | Björgvin Hólm | Pálmi Gunnarsson; Sigurður Karlsson; Tony Cook | Björk | 1977 | |
| "History of Touches" | Björk | Björk | Björk; Arca | Vulnicura | 2015 | |
| "Hollow" | Björk | Björk | Björk | Biophilia | 2011 | |
| "Holographic Entrypoint" (Note: "Holographic Entrypoint" includes traditional Noh chants by Shiro Nomura.) | Björk | Matthew Barney | Björk | Drawing Restraint 9 | 2005 | |
| "Hope" | Björk | Björk; Timbaland | Björk | Volta | 2007 | |
| "Human Behaviour" † (Note: "Human Behaviour" contains a sample from "Go Down Dying", a composition originally written by Antônio Carlos Jobim and later arranged by Quincy Jones, performed by the Ray Brown Orchestra and included in the album Harold Robbins Presents Music from The Adventurers (1970).) | Björk | Björk; Nellee Hooper | Nellee Hooper | Debut | 1993 | |
| "Hunter" † | Björk | Björk | Björk; Mark Bell | Homogenic | 1997 | |
| "Hunter Vessel" | Björk | Björk | Björk | Drawing Restraint 9 | 2005 | |
| "Hyperballad" † | Björk | Björk | Björk; Nellee Hooper | Post | 1995 | |
| "I Can't Help Loving That Man" (Note: "I Can't Help Loving That Man" is a cover of "Can't Help Lovin' Dat Man", featured in the 1927 musical play Show Boat, adapted from Edna Ferber's novel.) | Björk Guðmundsdóttir with Tríó Guðmundar Ingólfssonar | Oscar Hammerstein II; Jerome Kern | Tómas Magnús Tómasson | Gling-Gló | 1990 | |
| "Í Dansi Með þér" (Note: "Í Dansi Með þér" is an Icelandic cover version of "Sway", itself an English version of a 1953 mambo instrumental called "¿Quién será?". The English version was made famous by Dean Martin in 1954.) | Björk Guðmundsdóttir with Tríó Guðmundar Ingólfssonar | Pablo Beltrán Ruiz; Þorsteinn Sveinsson | Tómas Magnús Tómasson | Gling-Gló | 1990 | |
| "I Go Humble" (Note: "I Go Humble" interpolates "Shove Piggy Shove" a track by LFO later included in Advance (1996).) | Björk | Björk; Mark Bell | Björk; Nellee Hooper | "Isobel" | 1995 | |
| "I Miss You" † (Note: Remix versions of "I Miss You" feature English MC Rodney P.) | Björk | Björk; Howie B | Björk; Howie B | Post | 1995 | |
| "I Remember You" (Note: "I Remember You" is a cover of the 1941 song introduced in the film The Fleet's In (1942), where it was sung by Dorothy Lamour.) | Björk | Johnny Mercer; Victor Schertzinger | Björk | "Venus as a Boy" | 1993 | |
| "I See Who You Are" | Björk | Björk; Mark Bell | Björk | Volta | 2007 | |
| "I've Seen It All" ‡ (Note: The film version of "I've Seen It All", included in Dancer in the Dark (2000), replaces Thom Yorke with vocals from Peter Stormare.) | Björk with Thom Yorke | Björk; Sjón; Lars von Trier | Björk; Mark Bell | Selmasongs | 2000 | |
| "Immature" | Björk | Björk | Mark Bell; Björk (Note: The album version was billed as "Mark Bell Version" and was produced only by Bell. Another version, titled "Björk's Version" was included in the "Jóga" single and was produced only by Björk.) | Homogenic | 1997 | |
| "In the Musicals" (Note: The film version of "In the Musicals", included in Dancer in the Dark (2000), is split into two parts, titled "In the Musicals Part 1" and "In the Musicals Part 2". One part includes additional vocals by Joel Grey.) | Björk | Björk; Mark Bell; Sjón; Lars von Trier | Björk; Mark Bell | Selmasongs | 2000 | |
| "Innocence" † | Björk | Timbaland; Danja; Björk | Timbaland; Björk; Danja | Volta | 2007 | |
| "Isobel" † | Björk | Björk; Marius de Vries; Nellee Hooper; Sjón | Björk; Nellee Hooper | Post | 1995 | |
| "It's in Our Hands" † | Björk | Björk | Björk; Drew Daniel | Greatest Hits | 2002 | |
| "It's Not Up to You" | Björk | Björk | Björk | Vespertine | 2001 | |
| "It's Oh So Quiet" † (Note: "It's Oh So Quiet" is a cover of the 1948 German song "Und jetzt ist es still", originally sung by Horst Winter and famously performed in English by Betty Hutton in 1951.) | Björk | Bert Reisfeld; Hans Lang | Björk; Nellee Hooper | Post | 1995 | |
| "Jóga" † | Björk | Björk; Sjón | Björk; Mark Bell | Homogenic | 1997 | |
| "Jóhannes Kjarval" | Björk Guðmundsdóttir | Björk | Pálmi Gunnarsson; Sigurður Karlsson; Tony Cook | Björk | 1977 | |
| "Jólakötturinn" (Note: "Jólakötturinn" is a musical version of a poem by Jóhannes úr Kötlum.) | Björk Guðmundsdóttir | Jóhannes úr Kötlum | Ríkarður Örn Pálsson | Hvít er Borg og Bær | 1987 | |
| "Jólasveinar" § (Note: "Jólasveinar" is a traditional Icelandic ditty. Björk's version was credited as "Icelandic Christmas Song".) | Björk | Traditional | Kevin Ryder; Gene "Bean" Baxter | How the ... Stole Christmas | 1995 | |
| "Karvel" | Björk | Björk; Graham Massey | Graham Massey | "I Miss You" | 1997 | |
| "Kata Rokkar" | Björk Guðmundsdóttir with Tríó Guðmundar Ingólfssonar | Theodór Einarsson | Tómas Magnús Tómasson | Gling-Gló | 1990 | |
| "Keep Your Mouth Shut" (Note: "Keep Your Mouth Shut" interpolates portions of "You've Been Flirting Again", included in Post (1995).) | Tricky featuring Björk | Tricky; Björk | Tricky | Nearly God | 1996 | |
| "Komið" (Note: "Komið" was only included in certain editions of Medúlla (2004).) | Björk | Björk | Björk | Medúlla (Bonus track) | 2004 | |
| "Leaving London" | David Arnold with Björk | David Arnold | David Arnold | The Young Americans | 1993 | |
| "Like Someone in Love" (Note: "Like Someone in Love" is a cover of the 1944 song introduced in the film Belle of the Yukon (1944), where it was sung by Dinah Shore.) | Björk | Johnny Burke; Jimmy Van Heusen | Björk; Nellee Hooper | Debut | 1993 | |
| "Lilith" | Plaid featuring Björk | Plaid; Björk | Plaid | Not for Threes | 1997 | |
| "Lionsong" ‡ | Björk | Björk | Björk; Arca | Vulnicura | 2015 | |
| "Litli Tónlistarmaðurinn" | Björk Guðmundsdóttir with Tríó Guðmundar Ingólfssonar | Jack Holmes; Jón Sigurðsson | Tómas Magnús Tómasson | Gling-Gló | 1990 | |
| "Losss" | Björk | Björk | Björk; Rabit; Arca | Utopia | 2017 | |
| "Luktar-Gvendur" | Björk Guðmundsdóttir with Tríó Guðmundar Ingólfssonar | Nat Simon; Eiríkur Eiríksson | Tómas Magnús Tómasson | Gling-Gló | 1990 | |
| "Með mann á bakinu" § (Note: "Með mann á bakinu" is a flute instrumental recorded for the eponymous Icelandic short movie directed by Jón Gnarr (2004).) | Björk | Björk | Björk | —N/a | 2004 | |
| "Miðvikudags" | Björk | Björk | Björk | Medúlla | 2004 | |
| "Moon" † | Björk | Björk; Damian Taylor | Björk | Biophilia | 2011 | |
| "Mother Heroic" | Björk | Björk; E. E. Cummings; Guy Sigsworth | Björk | "Hidden Place" | 2001 | |
| "Mouth Mantra" | Björk | Björk | Björk; Arca | Vulnicura | 2015 | |
| "Mouth's Cradle" (Note: "Mouth's Cradle" includes throat singing by Tagaq.) | Björk | Björk | Björk | Medúlla | 2004 | |
| "Músastiginn" | Björk Guðmundsdóttir | Björgvin Gíslason | Pálmi Gunnarsson; Sigurður Karlsson; Tony Cook | Björk | 1977 | |
| "Mutual Core" | Björk | Björk | Björk | Biophilia | 2011 | |
| "My Juvenile" | Björk with Anohni | Björk | Björk | Volta | 2007 | |
| "My Spine" (Note: "My Spine" was originally included as a b-side in the single release of "It's Oh So Quiet" in 1995. The song was later included in the remix compilation Telegram (1996).) | Björk featuring Evelyn Glennie | Björk; Evelyn Glennie | Björk; Evelyn Glennie | "It's Oh So Quiet"; Telegram | 1995; 1996 | |
| "Mycelia" | Björk | Björk | Björk | Fossora | 2022 | |
| "Náttúra" † (Note: "Náttúra" features uncredited background vocals by Thom Yorke. Released as a standalone single in 2008, the song was later included in the deluxe edition of Biophilia (2011).) | Björk | Björk | Björk | —N/a | 2008 | |
| "Nature Is Ancient" "My Snare" (Note: "Nature Is Ancient" is also known as "My Snare". The former name was used in the initial Japanese limited edition of Homogenic, in the tracklist for Greatest Hits – Volumen 1993–2003, Family Tree and Surrounded, and during the Greatest Hits tour. The latter titling was only used in the single release of "Bachelorette".) | Björk | Björk; Mark Bell | Björk; Mark Bell | "Bachelorette" | 1997 | |
| "New World" ‡ | Björk | Björk; Sjón; Lars von Trier | Björk | Selmasongs | 2000 | |
| "No Embrace" | Björk with Dirty Projectors | David Longstreth | David Longstreth | Mount Wittenberg Orca | 2010 | |
| "North" § (Note: "North" and "Tetralogía" interpolate portions of a composition featured in the score for Drawing Restraint 9 (2005). The tracks were later used in the eponymous art installation by Gabríela Friðriksdóttir, and released in the accompanying soundtrack.) | Gabríela Friðriksdóttir featuring Björk | Björk | Björk | Versations/Tetralogía | 2005 | |
| "Notget" | Björk | Björk; Arca | Björk; Arca | Vulnicura | 2015 | |
| "Nu Flyver Anton" § | Björk | Jakob Gislason; Björk | Hilmar Örn Hilmarsson; Bjarne Helth Hansen | Anton | 1995 | |
| "Ó Borg, Mín Borg" | KK with Björk | Haukur Morthens; Vilhjálmur frá Skáholti | Unknown | Sódóma Reykjavík | 1992 | |
| "Ocean" | Björk with Dirty Projectors | David Longstreth | David Longstreth | Mount Wittenberg Orca | 2010 | |
| "Oceania" ‡ (Note: A remix version of "Oceania" features American singer-songwriter Kelis.) | Björk | Björk; Sjón | Björk; Mark Bell | Medúlla | 2004 | |
| "Óliver" | Björk Guðmundsdóttir | Jóhann Helgason; Björgvin Hólm | Pálmi Gunnarsson; Sigurður Karlsson; Tony Cook | Björk | 1977 | |
| "Öll Birtan" | Björk | Björk | Björk | Medúlla | 2004 | |
| "On and Ever Onward" | Björk with Dirty Projectors | David Longstreth | David Longstreth | Mount Wittenberg Orca | 2010 | |
| "One Day" | Björk | Björk | Nellee Hooper | Debut | 1993 | |
| "Ooops" # | 808 State featuring Björk | 808 State; Björk | 808 State | Ex:el | 1991 | |
| "Opening Titles" | David Arnold with Björk | David Arnold | David Arnold | The Young Americans | 1993 | |
| "Oral" † | Björk with Rosalía | Björk | Björk; Sega Bodega; Rosalía | —N/a | 2023 | |
| "Overture" | Björk | Björk | Björk | Selmasongs | 2000 | |
| "Ovule" † (Note: A remix version of "Ovule" by Sega Bodega features English artist Shygirl.) | Björk | Björk | Björk; El Guincho; Sideproject | Fossora | 2022 | |
| "Oxygen" | Evelyn Glennie featuring Björk | Björk; Evelyn Glennie | Björk; Evelyn Glennie | Her Greatest Hits | 1997 | |
| "Pabbi Minn" (Note: "Pabbi Minn" is an Icelandic reworded version of "O mein Papa", originally written for the 1939 musical Der schwarze Hecht.) | Björk Guðmundsdóttir with Tríó Guðmundar Ingólfssonar | Paul Burkhard; Þorsteinn Sveinsson | Tómas Magnús Tómasson | Gling-Gló | 1990 | |
| "Pagan Poetry" † | Björk | Björk | Björk; Marius de Vries (Note: On the Vespertine liner notes, Björk is credited as the sole producer for the song. On its single release, de Vries is credited as an additional producer.) | Vespertine | 2001 | |
| "Paradisia" | Björk | Björk | Björk | Utopia | 2017 | |
| "Pearl" (Note: "Pearl" includes throat singing by Tagaq.) | Björk | Björk | Björk | Drawing Restraint 9 | 2005 | |
| "Petrolatum" | Björk | Björk; Mark Bell | Mark Bell; Björk; Valgeir Sigurðsson | Drawing Restraint 9 (Surrounded edition) | 2005 | |
| "Play Dead" † (Note: "Play Dead" was firstly released as the lead single from the soundtrack for The Young Americans (1993). The song was later included in the reissued edition of Debut and released as the third single from the record.) | Björk with David Arnold | Björk; David Arnold; Jah Wobble | David Arnold; Danny Cannon; Tim Simenon | The Young Americans; Debut (Reissued edition) | 1993 | |
| "Pleasure Is All Mine" (Note: "Pleasure Is All Mine" includes throat singing by Tagaq and additional vocal performance by Mike Patton.) | Björk | Björk | Björk | Medúlla | 2004 | |
| "Pluto" | Björk | Björk; Mark Bell | Björk; Mark Bell | Homogenic | 1997 | |
| "Pneumonia" | Björk | Björk | Björk | Volta | 2007 | |
| "Possibly Maybe" † | Björk | Björk | Björk; Nellee Hooper | Post | 1995 | |
| "Prayer of the Heart" (Note: In "Prayer of the Heart" Björk sings the traditional prayer in Coptic, Greek and English.) | John Tavener with Björk | John Tavener; Traditional | Björk | A Portrait | 2004 | |
| "Qmart" | 808 State featuring Björk | 808 State; Björk | 808 State | Ex:el | 1991 | |
| "Quicksand" (Note: "Quicksand" samples "Apologies", written and performed by John Flynn, a.k.a. Spaces.) | Björk | Björk; Spaces | Björk | Vulnicura | 2015 | |
| "Ruby Baby" (Note: "Ruby Baby" is a cover version of the 1956 song by The Drifters, which later became famous in the version sung by Dion DiMucci. It was also considered a bonus track on Gling-Gló, as it did not appear on the release until 2008.) | Björk Guðmundsdóttir with Tríó Guðmundar Ingólfssonar | Jerry Leiber; Mike Stoller | Tómas Magnús Tómasson | Gling-Gló | 1990 | |
| "Sacrifice" | Björk | Björk | Björk | Biophilia | 2011 | |
| "Saint" | Björk | Björk | Björk; Arca | Utopia | 2017 | |
| "Scary" | Björk | Björk; Guy Sigsworth | Björk | "Bachelorette" | 1997 | |
| "Scatterheart" (Note: The film version of "Scatterheart", included in Dancer in the Dark (2000), is titled "Smith & Wesson" and includes additional vocals by David Morse, Cara Seymour and Vladica Kostic.) | Björk | Björk; Sjón; Lars von Trier | Björk; Mark Bell | Selmasongs | 2000 | |
| "Sharing Orb" | Björk with Dirty Projectors | David Longstreth | David Longstreth | Mount Wittenberg Orca | 2010 | |
| "Shimenawa" | Björk | Björk | Björk | Drawing Restraint 9 | 2005 | |
| "Short Term Affair" | Tony Ferrino featuring Björk | Steve Brown; Steve Coogan | Tot Taylor | Phenomenon | 1997 | |
| "Show Me Forgiveness" | Björk | Björk | Björk | Medúlla | 2004 | |
| "Sídasta Ég" | Björk | Björk; Guðlaugur Kristinn Óttarsson; Þór Eldon | Björk; Guðlaugur Kristinn Óttarsson | "Big Time Sensuality" | 1993 | |
| "So Broken" | Björk | Björk | Björk | "Jóga" | 1997 | |
| "Sod Off" | Björk | Björk | Björk | "Jóga" | 1997 | |
| "Solstice" | Björk | Björk; Sjón | Björk | Biophilia | 2011 | |
| "Sonnets/Unrealities XI" | Björk | Björk; E. E. Cummings | Björk | Medúlla | 2004 | |
| "Sorrowful Soil" | Björk | Björk | Björk | Fossora | 2022 | |
| "Stígðu Mig" | Björk | Björk; Guðlaugur Kristinn Óttarsson; Þór Eldon | Björk; Guðlaugur Kristinn Óttarsson | "Venus as a Boy" | 1993 | |
| "Stonemilker" ‡ | Björk | Björk | Björk | Vulnicura | 2015 | |
| "Storm" (Note: "Storm" was known as "Nameless" when it was performed during the Greatest Hits tour.) | Björk | Björk; Leila Arab | Björk | Drawing Restraint 9 | 2005 | |
| "Submarine" (Note: "Submarine" includes additional vocal performance by Robert Wyatt.) | Björk | Björk | Björk; Mark Bell | Medúlla | 2004 | |
| "Sue Me" | Björk | Björk; Arca | Björk; Arca | Utopia | 2017 | |
| "Sun in My Mouth" | Björk | Björk; E. E. Cummings; Guy Sigsworth | Björk | Vespertine | 2001 | |
| "Surrender" # | Ólöf Arnalds featuring Björk | Ólöf Arnalds | Davíð Þór Jónsson; Kjartan Sveinsson | Innundir skinni | 2010 | |
| "Sweet Intuition" (Note: "Sweet Intuition" is a reworked version of a demo of "Bedtime Story".) | Björk | Björk; Ken Downie; Ed Handley; Andy Turner (Note: An alternative version of "Sweet Intuition" appears on "It's Oh So Quiet" single as "Sweet Sweet Intuition". This version credits Björk as the sole writer.) | The Black Dog; Björk | "Army of Me" | 1995 | |
| "Synchronicity" § (Note: "Synchronicity" was featured in the Spike Jonze documentary Hot Chocolate (2004).) | Björk | Björk | Björk; Valgeir Sigurðsson | —N/a | 2004 | |
| "Tabula Rasa" | Björk | Björk | Björk; Arca | Utopia | 2017 | |
| "Þad Sést Ekki Sætari Mey" (Note: "Þad Sést Ekki Sætari Mey" is an Icelandic reworded version of "You Can't Get a Man with a Gun", originally performed by Ethel Merman in the musical Annie Get Your Gun (1946).) | Björk Guðmundsdóttir with Tríó Guðmundar Ingólfssonar | Irving Berlin; Loftur Guðmundsson | Tómas Magnús Tómasson | Gling-Gló | 1990 | |
| "Takk" | Björk with þórhallur | þórhallur Björk | Unknown | Sódóma Reykjavík | 1992 | |
| "Tetralógia" § | Gabríela Friðriksdóttir featuring Björk | Björk | Björk; Daníel Ágúst Haraldsson | Versations/Tetralogía | 2005 | |
| "The Anchor Song" | Björk | Björk | Björk | Debut | 1993 | |
| "The Boho Dance" (Note: "The Boho Dance" is a song originally recorded by Canadian singer-songwriter Joni Mitchell and included in The Hissing of Summer Lawns (1975).) | Björk | Joni Mitchell | Björk; Guy Sigsworth | A Tribute to Joni Mitchell | 2007 | |
| "The Comet Song" † (Note: "The Comet Song" was featured as the title track for the 2010 film Moomins and the Comet Chase and released as a standalone single in the same year. The song was later included in the Japanese deluxe edition of Biophilia (2011).) | Björk | Björk; Sjón | Björk; Matthew Herbert; Mark Bell | —N/a | 2010 | |
| "The Dull Flame of Desire" † (Note: "The Dull Flame of Desire" contains lyrics taken from a translation of a poem by Fyodor Tyutchev as it appears in the film Stalker by Andrei Tarkovsky.) | Björk with Anohni | Björk; Fyodor Tyutchev | Björk | Volta | 2007 | |
| "The Gate" † | Björk | Björk; Arca | Björk; Arca | Utopia | 2017 | |
| "The Modern Things" | Björk | Björk; Graham Massey | Björk; Graham Massey; Nellee Hooper | Post | 1995 | |
| "There's More to Life Than This" | Björk | Björk; Nellee Hooper | Nellee Hooper | Debut | 1993 | |
| "This Country Makes It Hard to Fuck" (Björk Remix) (Note: "This Country Makes It Hard to Fuck" is a remix of "This Country", a track originally released by Fever Ray on her 2017 album Plunge. Björk's remix was subsequently included in the Country Creatures EP and the Plunge Remix compilation.) | Fever Ray featuring Björk | Fever Ray | Fever Ray; Peder Mannerfelt | Country Creatures | 2019 | |
| "Thunderbolt" | Björk | Björk; Oddný Eir Ævarsdóttir | Björk | Biophilia | 2011 | |
| "Tondeleyo" | Björk Guðmundsdóttir with Tríó Guðmundar Ingólfssonar | Sigfús Halldórsson; Tómas Guðmundsson | Tómas Magnús Tómasson | Gling-Gló | 1990 | |
| "Trance" § (Note: "Trance" was recorded during the Volta sessions, but was only released as the soundtrack for To Lee, With Love, Nick, a tribute video to Alexander McQueen published by Nick Knight's website SHOWstudio in 2010.) | Björk | Björk | Björk | —N/a | 2010 | |
| "Travessia" § (Note: "Travessia" is a cover of the classic Milton Nascimento song. Björk recorded it for the compilation Red Hot + Rio but decided not to include it and the track later surfaced online.) | Björk | Milton Nascimento; Fernando Brant | Eumir Deodato; Arnaldo DeSouteiro | —N/a | 1996 | |
| "Triumph of a Heart" † | Björk | Björk | Björk | Medúlla | 2004 | |
| "Trölla-Gabba" | Björk featuring Kasimyn | Björk; Kasimyn | Björk | Fossora | 2022 | |
| "Undo" | Björk | Björk; Thomas Knak | Björk | Vespertine | 2001 | |
| "Unison" (Note: "Unison" samples "Aero Deck" by Oval, from the 1994 album Systemisch.) | Björk | Björk | Björk | Vespertine | 2001 | |
| "Unravel" | Björk | Björk; Guy Sigsworth | Björk; Guy Sigsworth | Homogenic | 1997 | |
| "Utopia" | Björk | Björk | Björk; Arca | Utopia | 2017 | |
| "Venus as a Boy" † | Björk | Björk | Nellee Hooper | Debut | 1993 | |
| "Verandi" | Björk | Björk | Björk; Valgeir Sigurðsson; Marius de Vries | "Hidden Place" | 2001 | |
| "Vertebræ by Vertebræ" | Björk | Björk | Björk; Damian Taylor | Volta | 2007 | |
| "Vessel Shimenawa" | Björk | Björk | Björk | Drawing Restraint 9 | 2005 | |
| "Victimhood" | Björk | Björk | Björk | Fossora | 2022 | |
| "Violently Happy" † | Björk | Björk; Nellee Hooper | Nellee Hooper | Debut | 1993 | |
| "Virus" † | Björk | Björk; Sjón | Björk | Biophilia | 2011 | |
| "Vísur Vatnsenda-Rósu" (Note: "Vísur Vatnsenda-Rósu" is a cover of a traditional Icelandic lullaby. Björk originally recorded the song for inclusion in the Hector Zazou compilation Chansons des mers froides (1994), and it was later included as a b-side in the single release of "Possibly Maybe" in 1996.) | Björk | Rósa Guðmundsdóttir; Jón Ásgeirsson | Hector Zazou | Chansons des mers froides "Possibly Maybe" | 1994; 1996 | |
| "Vökuró" (Note: "Vökuró" is a cover of a recording by Icelandic pianist and composer Jórunn Viðar.) | Björk | Jórunn Viðar; Jakobína Sigurðardóttir | Björk | Medúlla | 2004 | |
| "Wanderlust" † | Björk | Björk; Sjón | Björk | Volta | 2007 | |
| "When the World Comes to an End" | Björk with Dirty Projectors | David Longstreth | David Longstreth | Mount Wittenberg Orca | 2010 | |
| "Where Is the Line" ‡ (Note: "Where Is the Line" includes additional vocal performances by Mike Patton and Gregory Purnhagen.) | Björk | Björk | Björk; Mark Bell | Medúlla | 2004 | |
| "Who Is It (Carry My Joy on the Left, Carry My Pain on the Right)" † (Note: "Who Is It" includes throat singing by Tagaq.) | Björk | Björk | Björk | Medúlla | 2004 | |
| "Woe (I See It from Your Side)" (Björk Remix) † (Note: "Woe (I See It from Your Side)" is a remix of "Woe", a track originally released by Shygirl on her 2022 album Nymph.) | Shygirl featuring Björk | Shygirl; Karma Kid; Sega Bodega; Cosha; Mura Masa; Björk | Shygirl; Karma Kid; Sega Bodega; Mura Masa; Björk | Nymph_o | 2023 | |
| "Yoga" | Tricky featuring Björk | Tricky; Björk | Tricky | Nearly God | 1996 | |
| "You Only Live Twice" § (Note: "You Only Live Twice" is a cover of the Nancy Sinatra song, recorded for the 1967 James Bond film of the same name. Björk recorded it for the compilation Shaken and Stirred: The David Arnold James Bond Project but decided not to include it and the track later surfaced online.) | Björk | Leslie Bricusse; John Barry | David Arnold | —N/a | 1997 | |
| "You've Been Flirting Again" | Björk | Björk | Björk | Post | 1995 | |

== Other contributions ==
Key
| † | Indicates single release |

Name of song, performing artists, featured roles, originating albums, and year released.
| Song | Artist(s) | Role(s) | Album | Year | Ref(s). |
|---|---|---|---|---|---|
| "Sigur" | Bergþóra Árnadóttir | Background vocals; Shaker | Bergmál | 1982 | |
| "Við" | Bergþóra Árnadóttir | Background vocals; Shaker | Bergmál | 1982 | |
| "Þau Gengu Tvö" | Bergþóra Árnadóttir | Background vocals; Shaker | Bergmál | 1982 | |
| Johann Sebastian Bach's Matthäus-Passion | Pólýfónkórinn, Hamrahlíðarkórinn, Kór Öldutúnsskóla og 2 kammersveitir | Choir member (Hamrahlíðarkórinn) | Mattheusar-Passía | 1982 | |
| "Djúp Fyrir Mig" | Various Artists | Interpreter; Flute | Lystisnekkjan Gloría | 1986 | |
| "Lungu" | Various Artists | Interpreter; Flute | Lystisnekkjan Gloría | 1986 | |
| "Lifað Í Vatni" | Various Artists | Interpreter; Flute | Lystisnekkjan Gloría | 1986 | |
| "Sálmur 323" | Various Artists | Interpreter; Flute | Lystisnekkjan Gloría | 1986 | |
| "Við Birkiland" | Megas | Background vocals | Loftmynd | 1987 | |
| "Björg" | Megas | Background vocals | Loftmynd | 1987 | |
| "Plastpokablús" | Megas | Background vocals | Loftmynd | 1987 | |
| "Skúli Fógeti" | Megas | Background vocals | Loftmynd | 1987 | |
| "Á horninu" | Megas | Background vocals | Loftmynd | 1987 | |
| "Ástarsaga" | Megas | Background vocals | Loftmynd | 1987 | |
| "Magister Lyngdal" | Megas | Background vocals | Loftmynd | 1987 | |
| "Nótt" | Megas | Background vocals | Loftmynd | 1987 | |
| "það sem best er" | Megas | Background vocals | Loftmynd | 1987 | |
| "Börn í borg" | Megas | Background vocals | Loftmynd | 1987 | |
| "Reykjavíkurnætur" | Megas | Background vocals | Loftmynd | 1987 | |
| "Filahirðirinn frá Súrin" | Megas | Background vocals | Loftmynd | 1987 | |
| "Drukknuð Börn" | Megas | Background vocals | Höfuðlausnir | 1988 | |
| "Tæblús" | Megas | Background vocals | Höfuðlausnir | 1988 | |
| "(Borðið þér) Orma frú Norma" | Megas | Background vocals | Höfuðlausnir | 1988 | |
| "Borgarblús" | Megas | Background vocals | Höfuðlausnir | 1988 | |
| "Drengirnir í Bangkok" | Megas | Background vocals | Höfuðlausnir | 1988 | |
| "Í Öskjuhlíð" | Megas | Background vocals | Höfuðlausnir | 1988 | |
| "Aðeins eina Nótt" | Megas | Background vocals | Höfuðlausnir | 1988 | |
| "Álafossúlpan" | Megas | Background vocals | Höfuðlausnir | 1988 | |
| "Litla Stúlkan með Eldspýturnar" | Megas | Background vocals | Höfuðlausnir | 1988 | |
| "Telpurnar í Bangkok" | Megas | Background vocals | Höfuðlausnir | 1988 | |
| "(Öskjuhliðarendi) Homage á Paden Powel" | Megas | Background vocals | Höfuðlausnir | 1988 | |
| "Pæklaðar Plómur" | Megas | Background vocals | Hættuleg hljómsveit & glæpakvendið Stella | 1990 | |
| "Greip & Eplasafi" | Megas | Background vocals | Hættuleg hljómsveit & glæpakvendið Stella | 1990 | |
| "Ekki Heiti Ég Elísabet" | Megas | Background vocals | Hættuleg hljómsveit & glæpakvendið Stella | 1990 | |
| "Ungfrú Reykjavík" | Megas | Background vocals | Hættuleg hljómsveit & glæpakvendið Stella | 1990 | |
| "Söngur Um Ekkert" | Megas | Background vocals | Hættuleg hljómsveit & glæpakvendið Stella | 1990 | |
| "Styrjaldarminni" | Megas | Background vocals | Hættuleg hljómsveit & glæpakvendið Stella | 1990 | |
| "Hafmeyjarblús" | Megas | Background vocals | Hættuleg hljómsveit & glæpakvendið Stella | 1990 | |
| "Svefn er Allt Sem Þarf" | Megas | Background vocals | Hættuleg hljómsveit & glæpakvendið Stella | 1990 | |
| "Söngur um Ekkineitt" | Megas | Background vocals | Hættuleg hljómsveit & glæpakvendið Stella | 1990 | |
| "Worlds Collapse" | Bless | Background vocals | Gums | 1990 | |
| "Yonder" | Bless | Background vocals | Gums | 1990 | |
| "Falling" | Current 93 and Hilmar Örn Hilmarsson | Background vocals | Island | 1991 | |
| "Bedtime Story" † | Madonna | Songwriter | Bedtime Stories | 1994 | |
| "Party Town (The Groove of Hafnir City)" | HAM | Keyboards; Composer; Producer | Dauður Hestur | 1995 | |
| "Sodoma Theme" | HAM | Keyboards; Composer; Producer | Dauður Hestur | 1995 | |
| "Animalia" | HAM | Keyboards; Composer; Producer | Dauður Hestur | 1995 | |
| "On the Run Again" | HAM | Keyboards; Composer; Producer | Dauður Hestur | 1995 | |
| "Stressed Out" (Married to the Mob Mix) | A Tribe Called Quest | Remixer; Background vocals (Note: Björk sings background vocals only on the Married to the Mob Mix.) | "Stressed Out" | 1996 | |
| "Stressed Out" (Dandelions Mix) | A Tribe Called Quest | Remixer; Background vocals | "Stressed Out" | 1996 | |
| "Stressed Out" (Say Dip Mix) | A Tribe Called Quest | Remixer; Background vocals | "Stressed Out" | 1996 | |
| "Cabin in the Sky" | Matmos | Celesta | The Civil War | 2003 | |
| "Roses and Teeth for Ludwig Wittgenstein" | Matmos | Interpreter | The Rose Has Teeth in the Mouth of a Beast | 2006 | |
| "Up My Sleeves" | Death Grips | Found object (vocal samples) | The Powers That B | 2014 | |
| "Billy Not Really" | Death Grips | Found object (vocal samples) | The Powers That B | 2014 | |
| "Black Quarterback" | Death Grips | Found object (vocal samples) | The Powers That B | 2014 | |
| "Say Hey Kid" | Death Grips | Found object (vocal samples) | The Powers That B | 2014 | |
| "Have a Sad Cum" | Death Grips | Found object (vocal samples) | The Powers That B | 2014 | |
| "Fuck Me Out" | Death Grips | Found object (vocal samples) | The Powers That B | 2014 | |
| "Voila" | Death Grips | Found object (vocal samples) | The Powers That B | 2014 | |
| "Big Dipper" | Death Grips | Found object (vocal samples) | The Powers That B | 2014 | |
| "Sonnets/Unrealities XI" | Hamrahlíðarkórinn | Choir adaptation | Come and Be Joyful | 2020 | |
| "Cosmogony" | Hamrahlíðarkórinn | Choir adaptation | Come and Be Joyful | 2020 | |
| Unknown | Robin Carolan and Sebastian Gainsborough | Background vocals (Note: Björk's background vocals are mixed throughout the album. It's unclear which specific songs she's featured on.) | The Northman | 2022 | |

== See also ==
- Björk discography
- Björk videography
