= Björk discography =

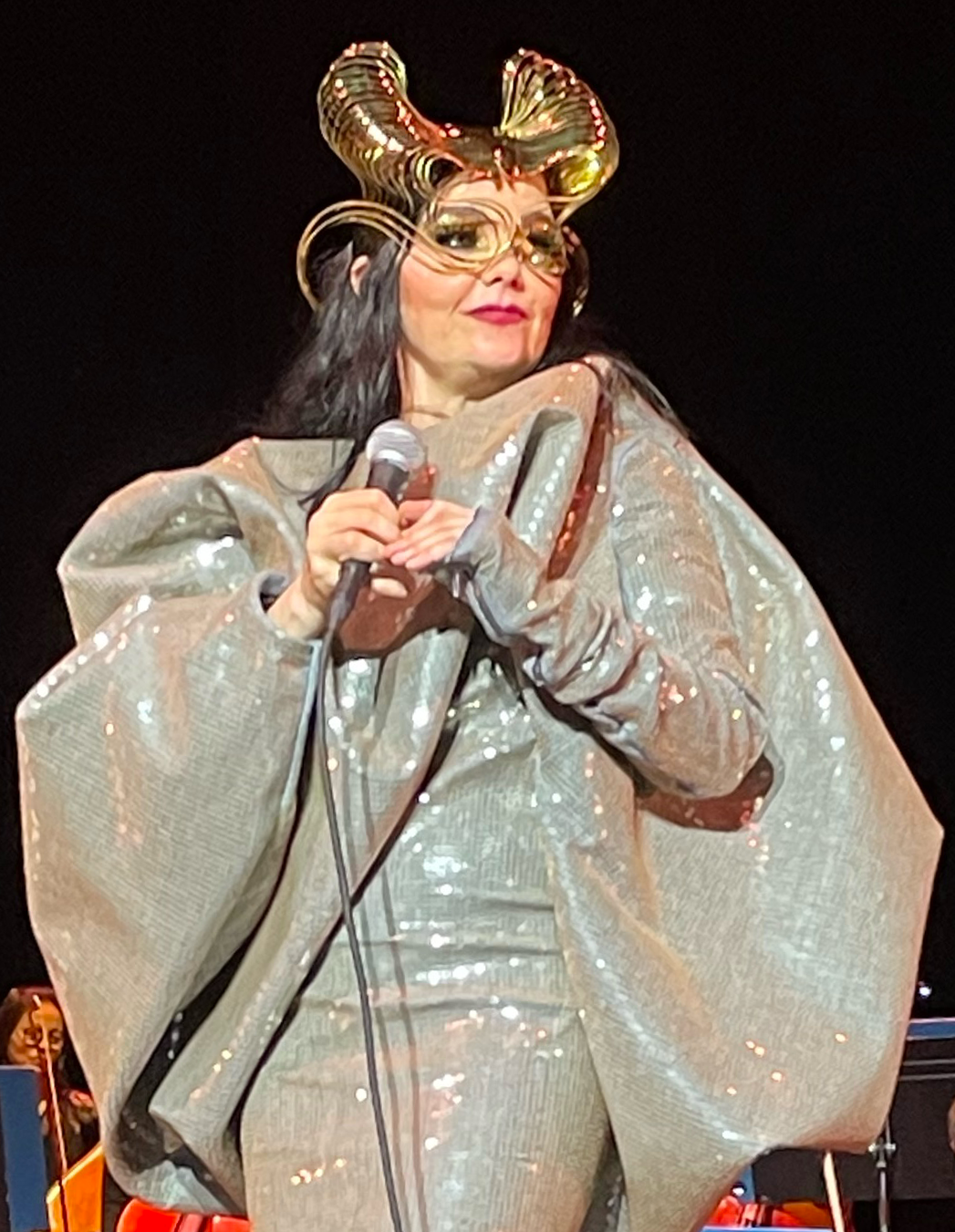
- Björk performing in Paris during her Björk Orkestral show in 2022
- Studio albums: 10
- Soundtrack albums: 2
- Compilation albums: 1
- Remix albums: 6
- Live albums: 9
- Box sets: 4
- Collaboration albums: 3
- Singles: 45
- Promotional singles: 10
- Remixes series: 8
- Other recordings: 4

The discography of Icelandic singer-songwriter Björk consists of ten studio albums, two soundtrack albums, one compilation album, six remix albums, nine live albums, four box sets, three collaboration albums, forty-five singles, ten promotional singles and eight remixes series. All of her recordings were released under One Little Independent Records (Note: Except Björk, Gling-Gló and Mount Wittenberg Orca, as noted below).

Björk started her career after a recording of her rendition of Tina Charles' 1976 song "I Love to Love" became popular on Icelandic radio. Her first eponymous solo release, considered juvenilia, (Note: Attributed to multiple references:) was released under Fálkinn label in 1977. Thereafter, Björk ventured into bands, singing as the lead vocalist of groups like Tappi Tíkarrass, Kukl, the Elgar Sisters and, most notably, the Sugarcubes. In 1990 she released Gling-Gló alongside Tríó Guðmundar Ingólfssonar, a cover album of jazz standards.

Björk released her first solo studio album, titled Debut, in 1993. A sleeper hit in United Kingdom, the record eventually hit the top three in the Official Charts Company and received platinum certifications from BPI, RIAA and ARIA. The album included the singer's debut single "Human Behaviour", which gained chart success on Billboard Alternative and Dance charts. The album was later reissued to include the third single "Play Dead", taken from the soundtrack of The Young Americans, which became her first top 20 single on BPI charts. Subsequent singles "Big Time Sensuality" and "Violently Happy" also obtained moderate chart success and recurrent rotation on MTV. Her second album, Post, was released in June 1995, and peaked at number two in the UK and was certified platinum by BPI and RIAA. The album spawned three top 10 singles in the UK, including "Army of Me", "Hyperballad" and "It's Oh So Quiet", which became her best-selling single and was certified gold by BPI. The album was followed by a companion remix album, called Telegram (1996). Björk focused on combining electronic beats with string instruments with her third album Homogenic (1997), which sold 1 million copies around Europe.

In 2000, Björk starred in Lars von Trier's feature film Dancer in the Dark, for which she also composed the companion soundtrack Selmasongs. "I've Seen It All", a promotional single from the album, received an Academy Award nomination for Best Original Song. Vespertine, the singer's fourth studio album, was released in 2001 and was certified Gold in the UK. The following year, Björk released her Greatest Hits compilation, a companion box-set, Family Tree, and a series of live albums, collected in the Live Box box set. In 2004, Björk released her fifth studio album, titled Medúlla, composed almost entirely using human voices and sounds. Its first promotional single, "Oceania", was commissioned by the International Olympic Committee for the 2004 Summer Olympics and debuted at the 2004 Summer Olympics opening ceremony in Athens. The next year, Björk starred in and composed the soundtrack for Matthew Barney's Drawing Restraint 9. Björk released her sixth studio album, Volta, in 2007. The album was her first to reach the top 10 on the Billboard 200 chart, while its first single "Earth Intruders" is Björk highest-charting single on the Billboard Hot 100 chart. The 2009 release Voltaïc, is a companion box-set consisting of live and remix recordings. Björk's seventh studio album Biophilia (2011), was a multimedia project encompassing various apps for each song, a series of educational workshops in four continents, a worldwide tour and a documentary. After releasing several remixes as a part of "The Crystalline Series" and the "Biophilia Remix Series", Björk released a remix album titled Bastards in 2012. After the end of the tour, the singer released her sixth live album, Björk: Biophilia Live.

Coinciding with a MoMa retrospective on her career, Björk released her eighth studio album, Vulnicura in 2015. The album was followed by the "Vulnicura Remix Series", an acoustic album called Vulnicura Strings, a live album, Vulnicura Live, and an immersive exhibition, Björk Digital, which culminated in the release of a virtual reality video album, Vulnicura VR. Björk's subsequent ninth and tenth studio albums, Utopia and Fossora, were released in 2017 and 2022 respectively. Both were promoted through remixes and a theatrical concert tour, Cornucopia. In 2025, the tour was released as a concert film, and as a live and video album.

== Albums ==
=== Studio albums ===
Title	Album details	Peak chart positions										Sales	Certifications
Title	Album details	ICE	AUS	CAN	FRA	GER	NOR	SWE	SWI	UK	US	Sales	Certifications
Debut	Released: 5 July 1993; Formats: LP · 2LPs · cassette · CD · DD · MD · digital download	2	10	40	16	24	9	2	18	3	61	Worldwide: 4,700,000; ICE: 7,000; US: 930,000; UK: 600,000	ICE: Gold; AUS: Platinum; CAN: Gold; NOR: Gold; SWE: Platinum; SWI: Gold; UK: 2× Platinum; US: Platinum
Post	Released: 12 June 1995; Formats: LP · 2LPs · cassette · CD · DD · MD · digital download	1	2	4	6	6	4	2	5	2	32	Worldwide: 3,000,000; ICE: 8,333; US: 846,000; UK: 400,000	AUS: Platinum; CAN: Platinum; EU: Platinum; SWE: Gold; UK: Platinum; US: Platinum
Homogenic	Released: 22 September 1997; Formats: LP · 2LPs · cassette · CD · DD · MD · digital download	1	6	20	2	10	3	5	13	4	28	ICE: 8,000; FRA: 300,000; NOR: 28,000; US: 501,000; UK: 216,000	CAN: Gold; EU: Platinum; SWI: Gold; UK: Gold; US: Gold
Vespertine	Released: 27 August 2001; Formats: 2LPs · cassette · CD · DD · DVD · digital download	1	9	2	1	3	1	7	3	8	19	US: 402,000; FRA: 169,970; NOR: 10,000	CAN: Gold; FRA: Gold; SWI: Gold; UK: Gold
Medúlla	Released: 30 August 2004; Formats: 2LPs · cassette · CD · DD · DVD · 2DVDs · digital download	1	17	6	1	5	3	7	3	9	14	US: 235,000; FRA: 129,916	FRA: Gold; UK: Silver
Volta	Released: 7 May 2007; Formats: 2LPs · CD · CD/DVD · digital download · cassette	1	20	6	3	9	1	11	3	7	9	ICE: 3,500; FRA: 20,000; US: 132,000; UK: 60,606	UK: Silver
Biophilia	Released: 5 October 2011; Formats: 2LPs · CD · 2CDs · box set · digital download · app · cassette	4	31	27	4	14	17	14	9	21	27	US: 51,000; FRA: 15,000; UK: 30,000	
Vulnicura	Released: 20 January 2015; Formats: 2LPs · CD · digital download · cassette	1	26	12	10	11	4	26	6	11	20	FRA: 30,000; US: 23,000	
Utopia	Released: 24 November 2017; Formats: 2LPs · CD · digital download · cassette · box set	3	22	—	35	26	—	28	12	25	75	UK: 7,989	
Fossora	Released: 30 September 2022; Formats: 2LPs · CD · digital download · cassette	4	55	—	32	10	—	37	5	11	100	US: 10,000	
"—" denotes items which were not released in that country or failed to chart.

=== Soundtrack albums ===
Title	Album details	Peak chart positions										Sales	Certifications
Title	Album details	AUS	AUT	FRA	GER	JPN	NOR	SWE	SWI	UK	US	Sales	Certifications
Selmasongs	Released: 18 September 2000; Formats: LP · cassette · CD · DD · digital download	54	21	4	22	17	2	12	20	34	41	FRA: 183,476	JPN: Platinum
Drawing Restraint 9	Released: 25 July 2005; Formats: LP · 2LPs · cassette · CD · DD · digital download	—	—	67	—	—	—	—	—	141	—		
"—" denotes items which were not released in that country or failed to chart.

=== Compilation albums ===
Title	Album details	Peak chart positions									Certifications
Title	Album details	AUS	AUT	BEL (WA)	GER	JPN	SWE	SWI	UK	US	Certifications
Greatest Hits	Released: 4 November 2002; Formats: 2LPs · cassette · CD · digital download	84	64	18	71	20	52	24	53	115	CAN: Gold; JPN: Gold; UK: Gold

=== Remix albums ===
Title	Album details	Peak chart positions						Notes
Title	Album details	AUS	FRA	JPN	UK	US	US Class.	Notes
The Best Mixes from the Album-Debut for All the People Who Don't Buy White-Labels	Release date: 26 September 1994; Formats: LP · cassette · CD · digital download	188	—	—	—	—	—	Selection of remixes from Debut. Includes mixes from Underworld and the Sabres of Paradise.
Telegram	Release date: 25 November 1996; Formats: LP · 2LPs · cassette · CD · digital download	—	—	—	59	66	—	Compilation of remixes from Post. It features remixes from Brodsky Quartet, Graham Massey and Eumir Deodato, along with vocals from Rodney P. It also includes the previously released song 'My Spine' with Evelyn Glennie.
Army of Me: Remixes and Covers	Release date: 2 May 2005; Formats: CD · digital download	—	168	—	—	—	—	A collection of remixes of "Army of Me". Björk selected twenty remixes from fans who put their version on her website. All proceeds went to UNICEF in response to the 2004 Indian Ocean earthquake and tsunami. As of January 2006, the album had raised around £250,000.
The Volta Mixes	Release date: 23 June 2009; Formats: 2LPs · CD · digital download	—	—	163	—	—	—	Remixes from the Volta singles included with the Voltaïc box set.
Bastards	Release date: 19 November 2012; Formats: 2LPs · CD · digital download	—	—	134	199	—	—	The album features remixes from Biophilia previously released on The Crystalline Series and Biophilia Remix Series. The songs were remastered by Mandy Parnell.
Vulnicura Strings	Release date: 6 November 2015; Formats: 2LPs · CD · digital download	—	—	—	—	—	9	Acoustic version of 2015's Vulnicura. Also known as Vulnicura Strings – The Acoustic Versions (Strings, Voice And Viola Organista Only)

=== Live albums ===
Title	Production details	Notes	Ref.
Debut Live	Release date: 1 June 2004; Formats: CD · digital download	The live albums previously included in Live Box, released separately in 2004.	
Post Live	Release date: 1 June 2004; Formats: CD · digital download	The live albums previously included in Live Box, released separately in 2004.	
Homogenic Live	Release date: 1 June 2004; Formats: CD · digital download	The live albums previously included in Live Box, released separately in 2004.	
Vespertine Live	Release date: 1 June 2004; Formats: CD · digital download	The live albums previously included in Live Box, released separately in 2004.	
Songs from the Volta tour	Release date: 23 June 2009; Formats: LP/CD · CD · CD/DVD · digital download	A live album recorded at Olympic Studios in London in 2007. A CD/DVD version includes also two live performances recorded during the Volta tour in Paris and Reykjavík. Both were also included in Voltaïc.	
Björk: Biophilia Live	Release date: 24 November 2014; Formats: 2CDs/DVD · 2CDs/BD · 3LPs/DVD · digital download	The last Biophilia tour show with "in-the-round" format, performed at the Alexandra Palace in London, was directed and edited by Peter Strickland and Nick Fenton. It was released as a concert film, debuting at 2014 Tribeca Film Festival and then receiving a series of screening around the world. The album also features bonus footage recorded at the Miraikan in Tokyo.	
Vulnicura Live	Release dates: 6 November 2015 (Rough Trade release), 15 July 2016 (Commercial release); Formats: 2CDs · 2LPs (Rough Trade release), Digital download · CD · 2LPs · box set (Commercial release)	Initially available exclusively through Rough Trade record shops, limited to 1000 copies per format. It was released in a commercial form in 2016.	
Cornucopia Live	Release dates: 24 January 2025 (Apple Music release), 24 October 2025 (Commercial release); Formats: Digital download · 2CDs · 2CDs/DVD · 3LPs · DVD · BD · UHD-BD	Originally released exclusively on Apple Music alongside Cornucopia, a concert film chronicling the eponymous concert tour. It was also made available in spatial audio. It was later released in commercial form with additional songs and different physical formats.	
Björk Orkestral with the Hamrahlíð Choir	Release date: 31 May 2026; Format: LP	Includes a selection of live performances from the Björk Orkestral tour. First released exclusively in physical form at the Echolalia exhibition at the National Gallery of Iceland and as a bonus purchase for every ticket sold to Björk's Echolalia Festival to celebrate the 2026 Solar eclipse. It was given a wide release in November 2026.	

=== Box sets ===
Title	Album details	Peak chart positions			Notes
Title	Album details	US	US Elec.	US Rock	Notes
Family Tree	Release date: 4 November 2002; Formats: 5Mini CDs/CD · digital download	—	6	—	Box set released concurrently with Greatest Hits. It features 5 Mini CDs with different releases, including works with the Elgar Sisters, Kukl and the Sugarcubes, B-sides and demo versions, live unreleased performances with the Brodsky Quartet, and a CD titled Greatest Hits as Chosen by Björk, which features a different track listing from the former release.
Live Box	Release date: 18 August 2003; Formats: 4CDs/DVD · digital download	—	12	—	It includes the live albums Debut Live, Post Live, Homogenic Live and Vespertine Live, along with a DVD with various TV and live performances, and a booklet featuring an interview between Björk and Ásmundur Jónsson. The four CDs were later released separately.
Surrounded	Release date: 27 June 2006; Format: 7DDs	—	—	—	A limited-release box set which included the then-5 studio albums and 2 soundtrack albums released in DualDisc format. On the CD sides, it includes the original albums, while the DVD sides contain each album remastered in Dolby Digital and DTS 96/24 5.1 surround sound. The corresponding music videos are also featured on the discs and are in PCM 2.0, Dolby Digital 5.1 and DTS 5.1.
Voltaïc	Release date: 23 June 2009; Formats: 3LPs/2CDs/2DVDs · 2CDs/2DVDs · digital download	118	—	44	This box-set includes various Volta-related materials: a live album recorded at Olympic Studios (Songs from the Volta Tour); a DVD (The Volta Tour live in Paris and Reykjavík) with two different performances: a show in Paris during the Volta tour and an acoustic showcase which took place after the end of the tour in Reykjavík; a DVD with the music videos of the singles released from Volta and a CD with remixes of the songs. The live CD and DVD were issued as standalone albums.

=== Collaboration albums ===
Title	Production details	Notes	Ref.
Gling-Gló (with Tríó Guðmundar Ingólfssonar)	Type: cover album; Release date: October 1990; Label: Smekkleysa; Formats: LP · cassette · CD · digital download	Released under the name Björk Guðmundsdóttir & tríó Guðmundar Ingólfssonar. Along with original songs, it features covers of Jazz standards sung in Icelandic. It was certified Gold in Iceland.	
Mount Wittenberg Orca (with Dirty Projectors)	Type: EP; Release date: 30 June 2010; Label: Domino; Formats: digital download · CD · LP	All digital sales proceeds were donated to the National Geographic Society Oceans Initiatives, which helps create international marine protected areas. An expanded Edition was released in 2023 as part of Record Store Day.	
Country Creatures (with Fever Ray and The Knife)	Type: EP; Release date: 1 November 2019; Formats: 12" vinyl	It features Fever Ray's remix of "Features Creatures", The Knife's remix of "Features Creatures" and Björk's remix of Fever Ray's song "This Country Makes It Hard to Fuck".	

== Singles ==
=== As lead artist ===
List of singles, with selected chart positions, showing year released and album name
Title	Year	Peak chart positions										Certifications	Album
Title	Year	ICE	AUS	FRA	GER	IRE	ITA	SWE	SPA	UK	US	Certifications	Album
"Human Behaviour"	1993	1	63	—	—	—	—	29	—	36	— (Note: "Human Behaviour" did not enter the US Billboard Hot 100 but did peak at number nine on the Bubbling Under Hot 100 extension chart.)	—	Debut
"Venus as a Boy"	1993	1	92	—	—	—	—	39	—	29	—	—	Debut
"Play Dead" (featuring David Arnold)	1993	18	65	—	41	18	—	7	—	12	—	—	Debut
"Big Time Sensuality"	1993	1	62	—	—	—	—	—	—	17	88	—	Debut
"Violently Happy"	1994	—	94	31	100	—	—	—	—	13	—	—	Debut
"Army of Me"	1995	1	35	22	55	—	—	12	—	10	—	—	Post
"Isobel"	1995	2	67	—	—	—	—	—	—	23	—	—	Post
"It's Oh So Quiet"	1995	1	6	57	—	7	—	29	—	4	— (Note: "It's Oh So Quiet" did not enter the US Billboard Hot 100 but did peak at number nine on the Bubbling Under Hot 100 extension chart.)	BPI: Gold	Post
"Hyperballad"	1996	13	31	—	—	—	—	34	—	8	—	—	Post
"Possibly Maybe"	1996	—	—	—	—	—	—	—	—	13	—	—	Post
"I Miss You"	1997	—	118	—	—	—	—	—	—	36	—	—	Post
"Jóga"	1997	1	70	—	—	—	34	37	—	—	—	—	Homogenic
"Bachelorette"	1997	6	95	17	—	—	23	—	—	21	—	—	Homogenic
"Hunter"	1998	—	—	55	—	—	—	—	—	44	—	—	Homogenic
"Alarm Call"	1998	10	—	—	—	—	—	—	—	33	—	—	Homogenic
"All Is Full of Love"	1999	—	—	—	—	—	—	—	—	24	—	—	Homogenic
"Hidden Place"	2001	—	54	20	70	49	24	47	1	21	— (Note: "Hidden Place" did not enter the US Billboard Hot 100 but did peak at number 50 on the Hot Singles Sales component chart.)	—	Vespertine
"Pagan Poetry"	2001	—	106	49	—	—	20	—	6	38	—	—	Vespertine
"Cocoon"	2002	—	74	61	—	—	—	—	9	35	—	—	Vespertine
"It's in Our Hands"	2002	—	—	97	—	—	—	—	—	37	—	—	Greatest Hits
"Who Is It"	2004	—	—	62	—	—	26	—	5	26	—	—	Medúlla
"Triumph of a Heart"	2005	—	—	63	—	—	33	—	6	31	—	—	Medúlla
"Earth Intruders"	2007	—	—	64	—	—	—	—	—	78	84	—	Volta
"Innocence"	2007	—	—	—	—	—	9	—	—	—	—	—	Volta
"Declare Independence"	2008	—	—	68	—	—	19	—	—	—	—	—	Volta
"Wanderlust"	2008	—	—	67	—	—	—	—	—	—	—	—	Volta
"The Dull Flame of Desire" (featuring Anohni)	2008	—	—	72	—	—	—	—	—	—	— (Note: "The Dull Flame of Desire" did not enter the US Billboard Hot 100 but did peak at number three on the Hot Singles Sales component chart.)	—	Volta
"Náttúra" (Note: "Náttúra" was included on the Deluxe Edition of Biophilia.) (featuring Thom Yorke)	2008	26	—	—	—	—	42	39	—	102	—	—	Charity singles
"The Comet Song" (Note: "The Comet Song" was included on the Japanese Deluxe Edition of Biophilia.)	2010	—	—	—	—	—	—	—	—	—	—	—	Charity singles
"Crystalline"	2011	12	—	—	—	—	76	—	—	—	— (Note: "Crystalline" did not enter the US Billboard Hot 100 but did peak at number 20 on the Hot Singles Sales component chart.)	—	Biophilia
"Cosmogony"	2011	23	—	—	—	—	—	—	—	—	—	—	Biophilia
"Virus"	2011	—	—	—	—	—	—	—	–	— (Note: "Virus" did not enter the UK Singles Chart, but peaked at number 35 on the UK Independent Singles Chart.)	—	—	Biophilia
"Moon"	2011	—	—	—	—	—	—	—	—	—	—	—	Biophilia
"The Gate"	2017	11	—	—	—	—	—	—	—	— (Note: "The Gate" did not enter the UK Singles Chart, but peaked at number three on the UK Vinyl Singles Chart.)	—	—	Utopia
"Blissing Me"	2017	—	—	—	—	—	—	—	—	— (Note: "Blissing Me" did not enter the UK Singles Chart, but peaked at number two on the UK Vinyl Singles Chart.)	—	—	Utopia
"Arisen My Senses"	2018	—	—	—	—	—	—	—	—	— (Note: "Arisen My Senses" did not enter the UK Singles Chart, but peaked at number 5 on the UK Vinyl Singles Chart.)	—	—	Utopia
"Atopos" (featuring Kasimyn)	2022	—	—	—	—	—	—	—	—	—	—	—	Fossora
"Ovule"	2022	—	—	—	—	—	—	—	—	— (Note: "Ovule" did not enter the UK Singles Chart Top 100 but peaked at number 39 on the Official UK Singles Sales Chart Top 100 on 28 April 2023.)	—	—	Fossora
"Ancestress" (featuring Sindri Eldon)	2022	—	—	—	—	—	—	—	—	—	—	—	Fossora
"Fossora" (featuring Kasimyn)	2022	—	—	—	—	—	—	—	—	—	—	—	Fossora
"Oral" (with Rosalía)	2023	—	—	—	—	—	—	—	—	— (Note: "Oral" did not enter the UK Singles Chart, but peaked at number 55 on the UK Singles Sales Chart.)	—	—	Charity single
"Berghain" (with Rosalía and Yves Tumor)	2025	27	—	32	12	32	20	44	1	36	— (Note: "Berghain" did not enter the US Billboard Hot 100 but did peak at number three on the Bubbling Under Hot 100 extension chart.)	PROMUSICAE: Platinum; AFP: Gold; AMPROFON: Gold; IFPI SWI: Gold; SNEP: Gold	Lux
"—" denotes releases that did not chart

=== As featured artist ===
List of featured singles, with selected chart positions, showing year released and album name
Title	Year	Peak chart positions			Album
Title	Year	UK	AUS	IRE	Album
"Ooops" (808 State featuring Björk)	1991	42	143	24	Ex:el
"Surrender" (Ólöf Arnalds featuring Björk)	2011	—	—	—	Innundir skinni
"Woe (I See It from Your Side)" (Björk Remix) (Shygirl featuring Björk)	2023	—	—	—	Nymph_o
"—" denotes releases that did not chart

=== Promotional singles ===
List of promotional singles, with selected chart positions, showing year released and album name
Title	Year	Peak chart positions	Album
Title	Year	ICE	Album
"I Love to Love"	1976	—	Non-album single
"I've Seen It All" (featuring Thom Yorke)	2000	—	Selmasongs
"New World"	2000	—	Selmasongs
"Oceania"	2004	—	Medúlla
"Where Is the Line"	2005	—	Medúlla
"Thunderbolt"	2011	—	Biophilia
"Mutual Core"	2012	—	Biophilia
"Stonemilker"	2015	8	Vulnicura
"Lionsong"	2015	21	Vulnicura
"On and Ever Onward" (Live from Housing Works 2009; with Dirty Projectors)	2023	—	Mount Wittenberg Orca (Expanded Edition)
"—" denotes releases that did not chart

=== Remixes series ===
Title	Production details	Notes	Ref.
"Björk Cut by the Sabres of Paradise"	Release date: 8 March 1994; Formats: LP	4 limited edition vinyls, with remixes of songs from Debut by The Sabres of Paradise, Masters at Work, The Black Dog and Underworld. Some of the remixes were later compiled on The Best Mixes from the Album-Debut for All the People Who Don't Buy White-Labels.	
"Björk Meets the Masters at Work"	Release date: 8 March 1994; Formats: LP	4 limited edition vinyls, with remixes of songs from Debut by The Sabres of Paradise, Masters at Work, The Black Dog and Underworld. Some of the remixes were later compiled on The Best Mixes from the Album-Debut for All the People Who Don't Buy White-Labels.	
"Björk Bitten by Black Dog"	Release date: 8 March 1994; Formats: LP	4 limited edition vinyls, with remixes of songs from Debut by The Sabres of Paradise, Masters at Work, The Black Dog and Underworld. Some of the remixes were later compiled on The Best Mixes from the Album-Debut for All the People Who Don't Buy White-Labels.	
"Björk in an Underworld Adventure"	Release date: 8 March 1994; Formats: LP	4 limited edition vinyls, with remixes of songs from Debut by The Sabres of Paradise, Masters at Work, The Black Dog and Underworld. Some of the remixes were later compiled on The Best Mixes from the Album-Debut for All the People Who Don't Buy White-Labels.	
"Enjoy / Possibly Maybe Remix Series"	Release date: 19 August 1996; Formats: LP	2 limited edition remix vinyls. They include remixes by Talvin Singh, Dobie, Mark Bell and Dom T. Some of the remixes were later compiled on Telegram.	
"Post Remix Series"	Release date: 18 August 1997; Formats: LP	5 limited edition remix vinyls. They include remixes by Photek, Dillinja, Goldie, Plaid and Towa Tei. Some of the remixes were later compiled on Telegram.	
"Alarm Call Remix Series"	Release date: 30 November 1998; Formats: LP	6 limited edition remix vinyls. They include remixes by Beck, Alan Braxe, Krust, Matmos and Mark Bell.	
"The Crystalline Series"	Release date: 19 July 2011 – 2 August 2011; Formats: digital download · CD · LP	A limited edition remix series in 4 parts. They include remixes by Omar Souleyman and Matthew Herbert. Some of the remixes were later compiled on Bastards.	
"Biophilia Remix Series"	Release date: 16 April 2012 – 12 November 2012; Formats: digital download · CD · LP	A limited edition remix series in 8 parts. They include remixes by Current Value, Death Grips, El Guincho, Hudson Mohawke, King Cannibal, Alva Noto, Matthew Herbert, 16bit, These New Puritans and The Slips. Some of the remixes were later compiled on Bastards.	
"Vulnicura Remix Project"	Release date: 10 June 2015 – 2 October 2015; Formats: digital download · LP	A limited edition remix series in 3 parts. They include remixes by Lotic, Kramphaft, Mica Levi, Untold, Katie Gately, Rabit, The Haxan Cloak, Juliana Huxtable, Bloom and Patten.	
"The Fossora Remixes"	Release date: 22 April 2023; Formats: digital download · LP	A limited edition remix LP collecting two remixes by Sideproject and Sega Bodega featuring Shygirl. Released during Record Store Day 2023.	

== Other recordings ==
Title	Production details	Notes	Ref.
Björk	Type: cover album; Release date: December 18, 1977; Label: Fálkinn; Formats: LP · cassette	In 1977, Björk released an eponymous album under her name Björk Guðmundsdóttir. It includes several cover songs. It is considered juvenilia and it is not included in her official discography. It is reported to have sold 10,000 copies in Iceland and to have been certified Platinum.	
Kórsafn	Type: sound installation; Release: January 2020	A sound installation developed in collaboration with Microsoft, audio design firm Listen and architecture office firm Atelier Ace, designed for the lobby of the Sister City Hotel in New York City, United States. The evolving music composition elaborated 17 years of choral recording and used an artificial intelligence model that responds to real-time weather data.	
Björk: Sonic Symbolism	Type: podcast; Release date: September 1, 2022 – October 13, 2022; Production: Mailchimp · Talkhouse	A podcast hosted by Björk in conversation with philosopher and writer Oddný Eir and musicologist Ásmundur Jónsson. The series provides an intimate reflection on the creation of each of Björk's albums, exploring the textures, timbres, and emotional landscapes that characterized their development.	
Nature Manifesto	Type: sound installation; Release: November 20, 2024 – December 9, 2024	An Immersive sound piece created alongside art director Aleph Molinari and IRCAM. The installation was showcased at the Centre Pompidou in Paris, France as part of the museum's "Biodiversity: Which Culture for Which Future?" forum. It combines natural soundscapes, calls of extinct animals reconstructed through artificial intelligence, and Björk's narration to address damages to biodiversity and the collapse of ecosystems.	

== See also ==
- Björk videography
- List of songs recorded by Björk
- The Sugarcubes discography
- Enjoyed: A Tribute to Björk's Post, a tribute album released by Stereogum
- List of best-selling albums by country (Iceland)
