= Við Og Við =

Við og við

Studio album by Ólöf Arnalds
- Released: 2007
- Genre: Folk music
- Length: 38:34
- Label: 12 Tónar
- Producer: Kjartan Sveinsson; Birgir Jón Birgisson

Ólöf Arnalds chronology
Við og við (2007)	Innundir skinni (2010)

Professional ratings
Review scores
Source	Rating
Reykjavík Grapevine Online	link
Spin	link

Við og við is Icelandic musician Ólöf Arnalds debut album, roughly translating to "Now and Then". It was released in 2006 by the 12 Tónar label. The album has been produced by Sigur Rós band member Kjartan Sveinsson who together with Skúli Sverrisson and Eiríkur Orri Ólafsson from Múm also contribute to the album by playing instruments on some songs.

== Track listing ==
1. "Englar Og Dárar" – 3:00
2. "Í Nýju Húsi" – 4:35
3. "Klara" – 2:29
4. "Við Og Við" – 5:39
5. "Orfeus Og Evridís" – 5:38 (originally by Megas)
6. "Vittu Af Mér" – 4:15
7. "Moldin" – 3:22
8. "Náttsöngur" – 4:33
9. "Skjaldborg" – 3:04
10. "Ævagömul Orkuþula" – 1:58

== Reception ==
According to a press release by One Little Indian, Við og Við was "named Record of the Year in Iceland and came in at #38 on Paste's Top 100 Albums list. eMusic recently named Við og Við as one of the 100 Best Albums of the Decade while MOJO proclaimed Ólöf as "Reykjavik's answer to Kate Bush". Ólöf's voice has been singled out for high praise as "otherworldly" by The New York Times, "stunning" by SPIN, "remarkable" by the NME, "ethereal" by Vanity Fair and "impossibly lovely" by Paste."
