= Þrír blóðdropar =

Þrír Blóðdropar

Studio album by Megas
- Released: 1992
- Genre: Pop/rock
- Length: 62:14
- Label: Skífan
- Producer: Jón Ólafsson, Hilmar Örn Hilmarsson

Megas chronology
Hættuleg hljómsveit & glæpakvendið Stella (1990)	Þrír Blóðdropar (1992)	Paradísarfuglinn (1993)

Þrír Blóðdropar was an album released in 1992 by Icelandic rock singer, Megas, through Skífan.
Formed by 16 songs Þrír Blóðdropar, which in Icelandic means “Three Drops of Blood”, counted with the participation of Bubbi Morthens for the song “Ég Get Líka (Boðlegir Vinir - Vænlegir Synir)”, Móeiður Júníusdóttir collaborated in “Rósin” and finally, the additional collaboration of guitar player Guðlaugur Kristinn Óttarsson and drummer Sigtryggur Baldursson.

== Track listing ==
Track	Title	Length	Lyrics	Audio clips
01	Halla og Eyvindur	03:56	-	-
02	Viltu Byrja með Mér	07:03	-	-
03	Gamansemi Guðanna	03:23	-	-
04	Mata	03:46	-	-
05	Mæja, Mæja	04:49	-	-
06	Sehnsucht nach der Sehnsucht	03:22	-	-
07	Kvöld í Atlavík	04:10	-	-
08	Raunakvæði	04:50	-	-
09	Vanskilablús (Fógetablús)	03:40	-	-
10	Söngur Mánans	02:48	-	-
11	Gefinn fyrir Drama (Reykingar Bannaðar í Gasklefanum)	04:04	-	-
12	Reyndu Mig	03:09		-
13	Ég Get Líka (Boðlegir Vinir - Vænlegir Synir)	04:14	-	-
14	Rósin	04:18	-	-
15	Súðavíkurlúða	03:31	-	-
16	Meyjarmissir	03:51	-	-
