= Sudden Elevation =

Studio album by Ólöf Arnalds
- Released: February 4, 2013 (UK); March 5, 2013 (US)
- Recorded: 2012 in Reykjavík
- Genre: Folk
- Length: 38:55
- Label: One Little Indian
- Producer: Skúli Sverrisson, Ólöf Arnalds

Ólöf Arnalds chronology
Innundir skinni (2010)	Sudden Elevation (2013)

Sudden Elevation is Icelandic musician Ólöf Arnalds' third album. The album was produced by Arnalds and Icelandic-American composer Skúli Sverrisson. It is her first album recorded entirely in English.

== Track listing ==
1. "German Fields" - 3:50
2. "Bright And Still" - 3:17
3. "Return Again" - 3:50
4. "Treat Her Kindly" - 2:50
5. "Call It What You Want" - 4:04
6. "A Little Grim" - 2:56
7. "Fear Less" - 2:53
8. "Numbers And Names" - 3:19
9. "Sudden Elevation" - 3:56
10. "The Joke" - 1:44
11. "Onwards And Upwards" - 2:35
12. "Perfect" - 3:41
