= Haugbrot =

Studio album by Megas
- Released: 2001
- Recorded: ???
- Genre: Pop/rock
- Length: 55:05
- Label: Ómi
- Producer: ???

Megas chronology
Far… Þinn Veg (2001)	Haugbrot (2001)	(Kristilega Kærleiksblómin Spretta í Kringum) Hitt (2002)

Haugbrot is an album released in 2001 by the Icelandic rock singer Megas. The album contained 14 songs and featured Guðlaugur Kristinn Óttarsson on guitar.

== Track listing ==
Track	Title	Length
01	Prelude: Jökullinn og Keilirinn	02:15
02	Vanhelgar Bækur	22:58
03	Ungbarnaútgerð	02:13
04	Utanbæjarmaður I	01:48
05	Utanbæjarmaður II	01:09
06	Interlude: Amfetmínóður	03:25
07	Modus Operandi SS	02:36
08	Mannkostir SS	01:17
09	Interlude: Árþúsundum síðar	01:02
10	Makleg Málagjöld Axlar-Bjarnar	03:12
11	Makleg Málagjöld Sveins Skotta	03:08
12	Finale: Óreiðan er Nafnið	00:35
13	Á þingvelli Árið 0 (Með Niðurlægingu)	05:21
14	Plaisir d'Amour #20 "Kveðja"	06:06
