= Nature Manifesto =

- Screenshot from a promotional video for Nature Manifesto, created by Sam Balfus (Balfua)
- Artist: Björk; Aleph
- Year: 2024
- Type: Immersive sound piece
- Location: Centre Pompidou; Paris, France

Nature Manifesto is an Immersive sound piece and multimedia installation by Icelandic artist Björk and artist and curator Aleph Molinari, created in collaboration with the French Institute for Research and Coordination in Acoustics/Music (IRCAM). The installation was showcased at the Centre Pompidou in Paris, France from November 20, 2024 to December 9, 2024, as part of the museum's "Biodiversity: Which Culture for Which Future?" forum. It combines natural soundscapes, calls of extinct animals reconstructed through artificial intelligence, and Björk's narration to address damages to biodiversity and the collapse of ecosystems.

== Background ==
Björk's work intricately weaves themes of nature and technology, reflecting her deep engagement with both realms. In 2008, she co-founded the Náttúra campaign to protest the construction of foreign-backed aluminum factories in Iceland, aiming to protect the country's natural landscapes. She released the single "Náttúra" featuring Thom Yorke, with all proceeds supporting this environmental initiative. Her 2011 album Biophilia further exemplifies this synthesis, exploring the relationships between music, nature, and technology through a multimedia project that included interactive apps, custom-made instruments, and educational workshops.

Björk's Cornucopia tour (2019-2023) seamlessly integrates themes of nature preservation and environmental activism, and featured a recorded message by Swedish climate activist Greta Thunberg. The tour's fusion of music, technology, and natural imagery reflects Björk's vision of a harmonious coexistence between humanity and nature, advocating for sustainable futures.

Björk has previously used artificial intelligence in her works. In 2020, she collaborated with Microsoft to create Kórsafn, a sound installation for the Sister City Hotel lobby in New York City which used an AI-powered model that elaborated choral recordings from her discography through a sensor on the rooftop of the building that would generate music according to data like the weather and the seasons. For her charity single "Oral", featuring Spanish singer Rosalía, she released a music video directed by photographer and visual artist Carlota Guerrero, who used AI-generated deepfake versions of the artists.

== Concept ==
"We wanted to share [the animals'] presence in an architecture representing the industrial age, far away from nature [...] In the veins of the escalator of the museum, known as the 'caterpillar,' we wanted to remind citizens of the raw vitality of endangered creatures.

— Björk and Aleph about the themes of Nature Manifesto.

Nature Manifesto is a three-minute and forty-second immersive sound piece. The composition merges Björk's voice, as she articulates a manifesto on biodiversity and the climate crisis, with cries of extinct and endangered animals, harmonizing them with natural soundscapes. The installation was curated by Chloé Siganos and Aleph Molinari, with associate curator Delphine Le Gatt.

The primary goal of Nature Manifesto is to foster a deeper understanding of humanity's impact on the natural world. Conceived as a "post-optimistic" manifesto, Aleph Molinari stated that the project's purpose was to "offer a voice to nature". He stated that "the modern concept of nature itself is problematic [...] because it’s a concept born in the Romantic period and, with the rise of the industrial era, became an antithesis to human civilisation and everything urban. Nature came to define what was outside, the savage Other... But nature is everything that we’re part of."

The soundscape features recreated calls of extinct and endangered species, developed in collaboration with the French sound research institute IRCAM. Artificial intelligence was employed to simulate the vocalizations of animals that no longer exist in the wild. To save energy and lessen the ecological impact of the use of AI, the research institute developed a "frugal AI" model capable of generating audio in real-time on local servers without a graphics processing unit. The sounds were then produced and edited by Björk in collaboration with Robin Meier Wiratunga and Bergur Þórisson.

The installation was located within the Centre Pompidou's escalator, known as the "caterpillar". The installation was further supported by videos created by visual artist Sam Balfus (also known as Balfua) by using artificial intelligence, and edited by Santiago Molinari.

== Activism ==
To sustain and broaden the themes presented in Nature Manifesto, Björk publicly urged French President Emmanuel Macron to prohibit bottom trawling within France's marine protected areas (MPA). She criticized the French government's claim of protecting 30% of its marine territories, highlighting that over 90% of these MPAs exist only on paper, allowing destructive practices like bottom trawling to continue unchecked.

She collaborated with non-governmental organizations Sustainable Ocean Alliance, Ungir umhverfissinnar and Bloom, to advocate for genuine ocean conservation. Björk promoted the cause through her social media profiles by sharing petitions. In November 2024, Björk lent her Instagram account to French environmental activists to directly address Macron. The activists used the platform to call for stronger protection of the ocean, urging Macron to impose stricter restrictions on harmful fishing practices, particularly bottom trawling.

== Reception ==
Nature Manifesto received mixed to positive reviews from critics. Some critiques focused on the installation's setting, suggesting that the movement inherent to the escalator space diminished the immersive potential of the soundscape.

The choice of using artificial intelligence was also questioned. Björk and Molinari defended this, as both see AI as a tool that can be used creatively and sustainably, with Björk focusing on the importance of human input to give AI a "soul", and Molinari stressing the need for sustainable technological practices in the broader context of digital life.

After the exhibition ended, Björk further opinionated: "this is how we will work in the future. [...] if there is no soul in tomorrow's music made by AI it is because [no one] put it there and we have to speak out and guard this as listeners", further stating that there is already "soulless muzak" [sic] on Spotify, "mass manufactured without the attention of creativity".

== See also ==
- Kórsafn – 2020 sound installation by Björk
