= Kórsafn =

Sound installation by Björk

- Artist: Björk
- Year: 2020
- Type: Immersive sound piece; Generative music
- Location: Sister City Hotel, New York City, United States

Kórsafn (Icelandic: Choral archives) is a sound installation by Icelandic artist Björk. Developed in collaboration with the technology company Microsoft, audio design firm Listen and architecture office firm Atelier Ace, the installation was designed for the lobby of the Sister City Hotel in New York City, United States, and launched in 2020.

Elaborating 17 years of choral recording taken from Björk discography, Kórsafn consisted of an evolving music composition that uses an artificial intelligence model that responds to real-time weather data, creating a continuously shifting auditory experience.

== Background and concept ==
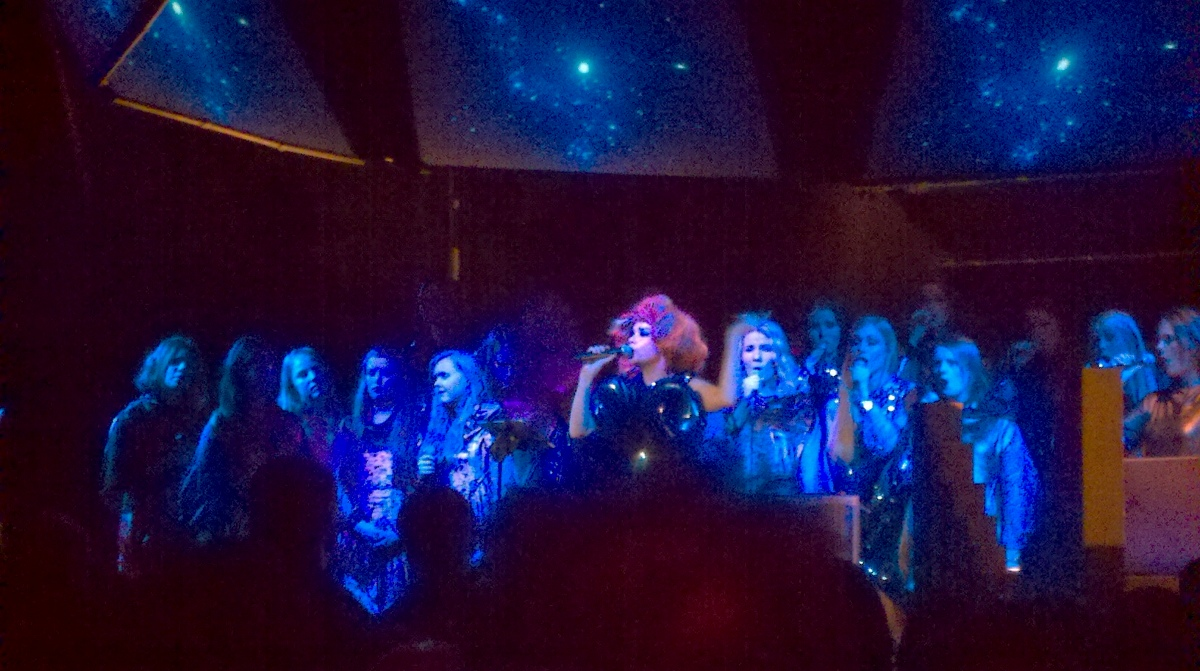
Björk performing with the Graduale Nobili choir during the Biophilia tour at the Roseland Ballroom in 2012.

In 2018, Björk announced her tenth concert tour Cornucopia, which debuted as a residency show at The Shed arts center. Before the start of the show, it was confirmed she would be accompanied by The Hamrahlid Choir. In 2019, while she was performing at The Shed, Björk stayed alongside the choir at the Sister City Hotel in New York City, where they would rehearse for the performances. While there, the Atelier Ace, which owns the Sister City boutique hotels, asked her to create a sound installation for the lobby. This was the second work commissioned by the hotel, a year after a similar piece by Julianna Barwick was featured in the lobby.

Kórsafn is formed from two Icelandic words, "kór" ("choral") and "safn" ("archives"). The installation features recordings of Björk’s choral works from the previous 17 years, including compositions taken from her albums Medúlla (2004) and Biophilia (2011). The artificial intelligence system was developed in collaboration with Microsoft.

The software processes data gathered from sensors and by a camera placed on the roof of the Sister City Hotel building and by a barometer. It then uses algorithms to determine how the choral elements are layered, pitched, and mixed in real time. The AI generate variations in real time by reacting to the passage of flocks, clouds, airplanes and changes in pressure. Data collected from sensors on the hotel’s rooftop include wind speed, cloud cover, and precipitation levels. These inputs influence the tonal quality, volume, and rhythmic patterns of the soundscape. The sound is played through hidden speakers in the hotel's lobby, blending with the architectural environment to create an immersive experience for guests. The AI system learns over time from the changing of the seasons and weather constantly evolving the sound - keeping in harmony with the sky.

Björk described the project as an "AI tango," expressing curiosity about the interplay between her choral compositions and the AI's interpretations of environmental data. She noted the significance of the Hudson Valley's rich bird migrations, which influence the generative aspects of the soundscape.

Due to the COVID-19 pandemic, the hotel closed while the installation was ongoing, making a version of the sound piece available online.

== Reception ==
Kórsafn was positively reviewed. It's Nice That author Jenny Brewer described the piece as "a high-tech alternative to the smooth jazz that usually whistles through hotel lobbies". Writing for CNET, Scott Stein observed that it "is lovely and low-key, and honestly, it just blends into the background. It's nothing wild, but it fits the hotel", adding that "after an hour, it didn't get annoying, or too repetitive".

The installation garnered several recognitions. It was nominated in the Fast Company's 2020 Innovation by Design Awards in the Hospitality category. It received three Clio Awards silver prizes, in the Use of Music in Experience/Activation, Sound Design and Emerging Technology categories.

== See also ==
- Nature Manifesto – 2024 sound installation by Björk
