= Tríó Guðmundar Ingólfssonar =

Icelandic musical group

Tríó Guðmundar Ingólfssonar (Eng.: Guðmundur Ingólfsson's Trio) was an Icelandic bebop group and a piano trio, which was disbanded following the death of its leader, the pianist Guðmundur Ingólfsson in 1991. The other two members of the trio were the drummer Guðmundur Steingrímsson and the bassist Þórður Högnason.

Although the trio performed jazz on its own, and was very successful in Iceland, its best known work (also, the best selling jazz album in Iceland) is the 1990 jazz collaboration with the pop and electronica diva Björk titled Gling-Gló (Eng.: "ding-dong").

== See also ==
- Björk Guðmundsdóttir & Tríó Guðmundar Ingólfssonar
