= Megas (album) =

Studio album by Megas
- Released: 1972
- Recorded: 1972
- Genre: Pop
- Length: 53:01
- Label: ???
- Producer: ???

Megas chronology
Englaryk í Tímaglasi (2002)	Megas (1972)	Megas 1972–2002 (2002)

Megas is the first album by Icelandic rock singer Magnús Þór Jónsson (better known as Megas).

The original album released in 1972 has 15 songs and was released on CD in 1994. The 2002 remastered reissue has seven bonus tracks, demos and live recordings. Most of the bonus tracks have not been released on any other album. "Pældu í því (sem pælandi er í)" is a variation of "Spáðu í mig" with a slightly different melody and a different lyric, but the same theme. A new version of the song "Adieu Capital" reappeared in 2005 on an album jointly released by Megas and Súkkat titled Hús Datt.

== Track listing ==
Track	Title	Length	Lyrics	Audio clips
01	Skutullinn	01:30	-	-
02	Um Óþarflega Fundvísi Ingólfs Arnarsonar	02:38	-	-
03	Silfur Egils	02:50	-	-
04	Dauði Snorra Sturlusonar	02:04	-	-
05	Um Grimman dauða Jóns Arasonar	01:41	-	-
06	Um skáldið Jónas	02:12	-	-
07	Jón Sigurðsson og Sjálfstæðisbarátta Íslendinga	01:40	-	-
08	Vertu mér Samferða inní Blómalandið Amma	03:39	-	-
09	Þóttú Gleymir Guði	01:30	-	-
10	Gamli Sorrí Gráni	01:32	-	-
11	Síðbúinn Mansöngur	02:58	-	-
12	Ófelía	02:41	-	-
13	Heilræðavísur	04:11	-	-
14	Um Ástir og Örlög Eyjólfs Bónda	07:25	-	-
15	Spáðu í Mig	02:31	-	-
16	Skutullinn	03:14	-	-
17	Nóttin Hefur Níðst á Mér	01:23	-	-
18	Grettir og Glámur	01:04	-	-
19	Sveinn og Pes	02:04	-	-
20	Ávarp til Fjallkonunnar	02:49	-	-
21	Pældu í Því (Sem Pælandi er í)	04:31	-	-
22	Adieu Capital	01:03	-	full length

Track note:

- Two different versions of "Skutullinn" are featured here.
