= Your Kiss Is Sweet =

Single by Syreeta

from the album Stevie Wonder Presents: Syreeta
- B-side: "How Many Days"
- Released: 1974
- Genre: Soul, funk, Reggae
- Length: 3:52
- Label: Tamla Motown
- Songwriter(s): Syreeta Wright, Stevie Wonder
- Producer(s): Stevie Wonder

"Your Kiss Is Sweet" is a song and single written by Stevie Wonder and Syreeta Wright and performed by Wright under the name, "Syreeta". Released in 1975 it reached 12 on the UK charts in 1975, staying there for 8 weeks. It was her second, and biggest hit in the UK charts. It appears on Stevie Wonder Presents: Syreeta, Syreeta's second, full-length Motown album.

The song was covered in Icelandic, as "Búkolla", in 1977 by Björk on her juvenile album "Björk".
