= Loftmynd =

Studio album by Megas
- Released: August 1987
- Genre: Rock
- Length: 62:51
- Labels: Gramm; Cat. No.: Gramm 34

Megas chronology
Í Góðri Trú (1986)	Loftmynd (1987)	Höfuðlausnir (1988)

Loftmynd ("Aerial") is the ninth studio album by the Icelandic rock singer Megas. Formed of 17 tracks, the album was released through Gramm as Megas' final release through the label in August 1987, as it would go bankrupt the next year. It is notable for featuring the Icelandic singer Björk and her sister Inga Guðmundsdóttir as background vocalists, with the former reappearing on Megas' followup Höfuðlausnir (1988). Loftmynd also includes Megas’ long-time collaborator Guðlaugur Kristinn Óttarsson who added guitars.

== Track listing ==
Track	Title	Length	Lyrics	Audio clips
01	Við Birkiland	02:33	-	-
02	Björg	04:13	-	-
03	Plaspokablús	04:22	-	-
04	Skúli Fógeti	02:33	-	-
05	Á Horningu	03:44	-	-
06	Ástarsaga	04:46	-	-
07	Magister Lyngdal	01:57	-	-
08	Jón	02:04	-	-
09	Nótt	03:13	-	-
10	Enginn Vegur Fær	04:41	-	-
11	Veinaðu Úlfur Úlfur	02:28	-	-
12	Það sem Best er	02:47		-
13	Börn í Borg	01:58	-	-
14	Reykjavíkurnætur	04:45	-	full
15	Björt ljós Borgarljós	05:29	-	-
16	Innréttingarblús	03:40	-	-
17	Fílahirðirinn frá Súrín	05:43	-	-
18	Reykjavíkurnætur (Demo)	05:55	-	-
