= Megas 1972–2002 =

Megas 1972-2002

Compilation album by Megas
- Released: 2002
- Genre: Pop, rock
- Length: 145:33
- Label: Skífan

Megas chronology
Englaryk í Tímaglasi (2002)	Megas 1972-2002 (2002)

Megas 1972–2002 is a compilation released in 2002 by the Icelandic rock singer Megas to commemorate the 30th anniversary of his music career. This compilation, made up of 43 tracks, contains several of Megas's hits, from the first album titled Megas (1972) to Englaryk í Tímaglasi (2002).

The compilation features singer Björk as backing vocalist and the long-time collaborator, Guðlaugur Kristinn Óttarsson, who added guitars on several tracks.

== Track listing ==
Track	Title	Length	Lyrics	Audio clips
01	Skutullinn	01:30	-	-
02	Heilræðavísur	04:11	-	-
03	Þótt Þú Gleymir Guði	01:30	-	-
04	Gamli Sorrí Gráni	01:32	-	-
05	Komdu og Skoðaðu í Kistuna Mína	04:53	-	-
06	Spáðu í Mig	03:51	-	-
07	Ég á Mig Sjálf (Söngurinn Hennar Diddu)	04:29	-	-
08	Ragnheiður Biskupsdóttir	02:45	-	-
09	Gamla Gasstöðin við Hlemm	03:48	-	-
10	Sút Fló í Brjóstið Inn	05:12	-	-
11	Í Speglasalinn	05:48	-	-
12	Jólanáttburður	01:14	-	-
13	Saga úr Sveitinni	03:28	-	-
14	Útumholtoghólablús	03:41	-	-
15	Paradísarfuglinn	03:45	-	-
16	Orfeus og Evridís	04:53	-	-
17	Nú er Ég Klæddur	01:26	-	-
18	Nú Tjaldar Foldin fríða	02:12	-	-
19	Formsatriði var Ekki Fullnægt	04:00	-	-
20	Lóa Lóa	03:26	-	-
21	Fríða, Fríða	04:37	-	-
22	Þú Bíður (Allavegana) eftir Mér	03:41	-	-
23	Við Birkiland	02:34	-	-
24	Björg	04:13	-	-
25	Reykjavíkurnætur	04:46	-	full
26	Börn í Borg	02:00	-	-
27	(Borðið Þér) Orma frú Norma	05:02	-	-
28	Álafossúlpa	06:54	-	-
29	Aðeins Eina Nótt	03:16	-	-
30	Tvær Stjörnur	03:04	-	-
31	Vatnsrennibrautin	04:00	-	-
32	Gamansemi Guðanna	03:19	-	-
33	Mæja, Mæja	04:46	-	-
34	Rauðar Rútur	04:36	-	-
35	Söngur um Ekki Neitt	04:23	-	-
36	Litlir Sætir Strákar	03:54	-	-
37	Kölski og Ýsan	02:27	-	-
38	Ef Heimur Eigi	01:47	-	-
39	SkiptiMynt í Buddunni Þinni	04:31	-	-
40	Á Barnum	03:41	-	-
41	Tröð	03:09	-	-
42	Þín er Vænst	02:39	-	-
43	Rósa ég Kyssi	02:40	-	-
