= Stevie Wonder Presents: Syreeta =

1974 studio album by Syreeta

Studio album by Syreeta
- Released: June 19, 1974
- Recorded: 1973–1974
- Studio: The Record Plant (Los Angeles)
- Genre: R&B, smooth soul, funk, pop, reggae, psychedelic soul
- Length: 39:37
- Label: Motown; M 808
- Producer: Stevie Wonder

Syreeta chronology
| Syreeta (1972) | Stevie Wonder Presents: Syreeta (1974) | One to One (1977) |

Singles from Stevie Wonder Presents: Syreeta
- 1. "Come and Get This Stuff" Released: June 11, 1974; 2. "I'm Goin' Left" Released: August 27, 1974; 3. "Spinnin' and Spinnin'" Released: September 1974 (UK); 4. "Your Kiss Is Sweet" Released: January 1975 (UK)

Stevie Wonder Presents: Syreeta is the second studio album by American singer and songwriter Syreeta Wright, released on June 19, 1974, on Motown.

== Overview ==
Produced by Wonder, Stevie Wonder Presents: Syreeta featured guest appearances by fellow singers G.C. Cameron, Deniece Williams and Minnie Riperton.

== Critical reception ==
Professional ratings
Review scores
| Source | Rating |
|---|---|
| AllMusic | 4.5/5 stars |

Donald A. Guarisco of Allmusic in 4.5/5 review called Stevie Wonder Presents Syreeta, "the most delightful and consistent album of her career. As with Syreeta, this album pursues a combination of smooth soul tracks ideally suited to Syreeta's silky vocal range and more experimental outings that are creatively in line with Wonder's then-current solo work. However, the eclecticism that weighed down Syreeta is transformed into a strength on Stevie Wonder Presents Syreeta: the tracks pursue a dazzling array of different pop-soul styles, but everything is kept in check by solid performances from everyone involved and tight arrangements that keep the album's hook-filled songs on track."

Peter Reilly of Stereo Review remarked "Syreeta is fun as she sidles through her material with all the nonchalance and insouciance of a girl who knows she's got something extra. The production and arrangements by Wonder are, as usual, marvelous...no one else can create that special, carefree, joyous feeling of musicians having a ball with their own work that pervades even a routine Wonder session. In this instance, Syreeta seems to be having more fun than anyone."

== Track listing ==
| No. | Title | Writer(s) | Length |
|---|---|---|---|
| 1. | "I'm Goin' Left" | Stevie Wonder, Syreeta Wright | 3:36 |
| 2. | "Spinnin' and Spinnin'" | Stevie Wonder, Syreeta Wright | 4:21 |
| 3. | "Your Kiss Is Sweet" | Stevie Wonder, Syreeta Wright | 4:31 |
| 4. | "Come and Get This Stuff" | Stevie Wonder | 3:38 |
| 5. | "Heavy Day" | Stevie Wonder, Syreeta Wright | 4:00 |
| 6. | "Cause We've Ended as Lovers" | Stevie Wonder | 4:30 |
| 7. | "Just a Little Piece of You" | Stevie Wonder, Syreeta Wright | 4:01 |
| 8. | "Waitin' for the Postman" | Stevie Wonder | 1:47 |
| 9. | "When Your Daddy's Not Around" (featuring Dennis Morrison) | Stevie Wonder | 1:03 |
| 10. | "I Wanna Be by Your Side" (featuring G.C. Cameron) | Stevie Wonder | 4:04 |
| 11. | "Universal Sound of the World (Your Kiss Is Sweet)" | Stevie Wonder, Syreeta Wright | 4:06 |

== Personnel ==
- Syreeta Wright, Stevie Wonder, Dennis Morrison, G.C. Cameron - lead vocals
- Marlo Henderson, Michael Sembello - guitar
- Reggie McBride - bass
- Ollie E. Brown - drums
- Denny Morouse - tenor saxophone
- Steve Madaio - trumpet
- Anita Sherman, Deniece Williams, Lani Groves, Minnie Riperton, Shirley Brewer - backing vocals
- Paul Riser - string arrangements

== Charts ==
| Year | Album | Chart positions | | |
| Year | Album | US | US R&B | AUS |
|---|---|---|---|---|
| 1974 | Stevie Wonder Presents: Syreeta | 116 | 53 | 93 |
