= Höfuðlausnir =

Studio album by Megas
- Released: May 1988
- Genre: Pop; Rock
- Length: 74:04
- Label: Gramm

Megas chronology
| Loftmynd (1987) | Höfuðlausnir (1988) | Bláir Draumar (1988) |

Höfuðlausnir was an album released in May 1988 by Icelandic rock singer Megas. This album was released through Gramm and featured singers Björk and Rose McDowall as background vocalists. Höfuðlausnir also includes Megas’ long-time collaborator Guðlaugur Kristinn Óttarsson who adding guitars to this work.

== Track listing ==
| Track | Title | Length | Lyrics | Audio clips |
|---|---|---|---|---|
| 01 | Drukknuð Börn | 04:55 | - | full |
| 02 | Tæblús | 03:25 | - | - |
| 03 | (Borðið þér) Orma frú Norma | 05:02 | - | - |
| 04 | Borgarblús | 03:30 | - | - |
| 05 | Drengirnir í Bangkok | 07:35 | - | - |
| 06 | Í Öskjuhlíð | 03:09 | - | - |
| 07 | Leiðréttingarblús | 04:07 | - | - |
| 08 | Aðeins eina Nótt | 03:16 | - | - |
| 09 | Álafossúlpan | 06:54 | - | - |
| 10 | Litla Stúlkan með Eldspýturnar | 04:25 | - | - |
| 11 | Telpurnar í Bangkok | 07:18 | - | - |
| 12 | (Öskjuhliðarendi) Homage á Paden Powel | 03:06 | - | - |
| 13 | Aðeins eina Nótt | 03:18 | - | - |
| 14 | Drukknuð Börn | 03:47 | - | - |
| 15 | Í Öskjuhlíð | 02:21 | - | - |
| 16 | Drengirnir í Bangkok | 05:29 | - | - |
| 17 | (Borðið Þér) Orma frú Norma | 05:07 | - | - |
