= Hættuleg hljómsveit & glæpakvendið Stella =

Studio album by Megas
- Released: September 1990
- Recorded: 1990
- Studio: Sýrland
- Genre: Pop/Rock
- Length: 87:10
- Label: Megas

Megas chronology
Bláir Draumar (1988)	Hættuleg hljómsveit & glæpakvendið Stella (1990)	Þrír Blóðdropar (1992)

Hættuleg hljómsveit & glæpakvendið Stella is an album released in September 1990 by Icelandic rock singer Megas. This double CD album features the Sugarcubes, a band led by Björk and Einar Örn Benediktsson. Guðlaugur Kristinn Óttarsson is featured here adding guitars.

The album was originally published in 2,999 numbered copies, a deliberate act since at the time an album had to sell in 3,000 copies in Iceland to be considered gold.

== CD 1 - Track listing ==
CD length: 46:10

Track	Title	Length
01	Pæklaðar Plómur	04:04
02	Furstinn	04:19
03	Greip & Eplasafi	04:48
04	Rauðar Rútur	04:43
05	Heilræðavísur	03:04
06	Ekki Heiti Ég Elísabet	04:53
07	Marta Smarta	03:12
08	Ungfrú Reykjavík	05:04
09	Keflavíkurkajablús	03:09
10	Söngur Um Ekkert	10:14

== CD 2 - Track listing ==
CD length: 41:00

Track	Title	Length
01	Styrjaldarminni	03:13
02	Hafmeyjarblús	05:45
03	Svefn er Allt Sem Þarf	04:46
04	Partí	04:04
05	Ekkert Hefur Skeð	04:24
06	Hríðin	05:31
07	Dansleikur	07:59
08	Söngur um Ekkineitt	04:25
09	Elskhuginn	02:53
