= Björk Guðmundsdóttir & tríó Guðmundar Ingólfssonar =

Icelandic jazz music band

Background information
- Origin: Reykjavík, Iceland
- Genre: Jazz
- Years active: 1990–1991
- Labels: Smekkleysa; One Little Indian
- Past members: Björk Guðmundsdóttir; Guðmundur Ingólfsson; Guðmundur Steingrímsson; Þórður Högnason

Björk Guðmundsdóttir & tríó Guðmundar Ingólfssonar was an Icelandic jazz music band. The band formed in 1990 when singer and songwriter Björk, who at the time sang for The Sugarcubes, joined the tríó Guðmundar Ingólfssonar with pianist Guðmundur Ingólfsson, drummer Guðmundur "Pappa Jazz" Steingrímsson, and bassist Þórður Högnason.

== History ==
According to one version of events, Björk and Guðmundur Ingólfsson developed a friendship after playing together in 1987 at Hótel Borg in Reykjavík. Another story says that Björk's appearances on a local jazz radio program called Góðravinafundur made an impression on Guðmundur Steingrímsson, and that she, at the age of 16, would hang around his recording sessions at Labbi Þórarinsson's farm Glora.

The group's only album, Gling-Gló (1990), went platinum in Iceland. It was distributed by Bad Taste in Iceland and One Little Indian in the U.K. In 1991 pianist Guðmundur Ingólfsson died of cancer and the group disbanded.

The album contains Icelandic songs and a few jazz songs. Björk sang in English on two songs: "Ruby Baby" and "I Can't Help Loving That Man". and in Icelandic on "Það sést ekki sætari mey" (English: "There Is No Sweeter Girl"), which is incorrectly cited in the liner notes as having been written by Rodgers and Hammerstein. The song is a cover version of "You Can't Get a Man with a Gun" by Irving Berlin from the musical Annie Get Your Gun. The Icelandic songs were recorded live at Studio Syrland in Reykjavík. The two English songs were recorded on August 23, 1990 at Ríkisútvarpið (the Icelandic National Broadcasting Service).

== Members ==
- Björk Guðmundsdóttir – vocals, harmonica
- Guðmundur Ingólfsson – piano, tambourine
- Þórður Högnason – bass
- Guðmundur "Pappa Jazz" Steingrímsson – drums, maracas, Christmas bells

== Discography ==
- Gling-Gló (1990)
