= Ólöf Arnalds =

Icelandic singer/songwriter and musician

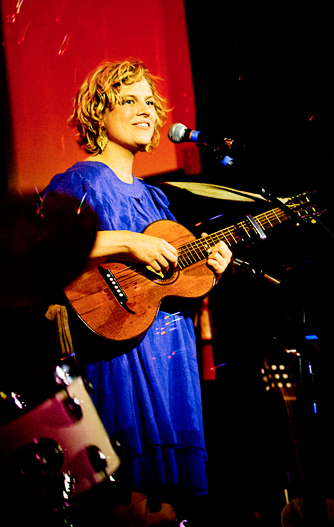
- Ólöf in 2010

Background information
- Born: 4 January 1980 (age 46)
- Origin: Iceland
- Occupations: Singer; songwriter; musician
- Instruments: Vocals; violin; stroh violin; guitar; charango; koto
- Years active: 2002–present
- Label: One Little Independent
- Formerly of: Múm
- Website: olofarnalds.com

Ólöf Arnalds (born 4 January 1980) is an Icelandic singer-songwriter and indie musician who has been active within the Icelandic music scene since the early 2000s. She was a touring member of múm for five years from 2003 before launching her solo career and has released five albums to date. She has collaborated with bands and artists such as Björk, Stórsveit Nix Noltes, Mugison, Slowblow and Skúli Sverrisson. Between 1988 and 2002, Ólöf studied violin and classical singing, and from 2002 to 2006 she studied composition and new media at Iceland Academy of the Arts.

In 2007, her debut album Við Og Við was released by 12 Tónar. The album features a set of songs performed mostly in a traditional troubadour style.

Her second album, Innundir skinni, was released by One Little Independent Records. In September 2010.

Her third album, Sudden Elevation was released again by One Little Independent Records. In February 2013.

Her fourth album, Palme was released again by One Little Independent Records. In September 2014.

Her fifth album, Spira was released by Bella Union. In December 2025

== Við og Við ==
Ólöf's debut album Við og Við was originally released in Iceland in 2007 by 12 Tónar, but was not released in the United Kingdom and the United States until 2009, after she had signed to One Little Independent Records. Word of mouth – including Björk's patronage – earned Við og Við high-profile plaudits in the US, ranking in Paste Magazine's Top 100 Albums of 2007 and eMusic's editor's list of the Best Albums of 2008. The success of Við og Við in the US led to Ólöf touring with Blonde Redhead, Jonathan Richman, Björk, The Dirty Projectors and Jeff Mangum, and to her being covered extensively in US publications including Vanity Fair, The New York Times, Village Voice and Time Out New York.

== Innundir Skinni ==
Ólöf's second album Innundir Skinni was released in 2010 by One Little Independent Records. It marked a departure from her previous work by including three English language songs, including the single Surrender, which features Björk's distinctive vocal in the background.

The album was produced by then Sigur Rós members Kjartan Sveinsson and Davíð Þór Jónsson, and featured contributions from Björk, Skúli Sverrisson (Laurie Anderson, Lou Reed), Shahzad Ismaily (Tom Waits, Plastic Ono Band, Bonnie "Prince" Billy), María Huld Markan Sigfúsdóttir (Amiina), and Ragnar.

== Sudden Elevation ==
Ólöf released her third album Sudden Elevation in 2013 on One Little Independent Records and it is her first album sung entirely in English. Produced again by long-time collaborator, Skúli Sverrisson, Sudden Elevation was largely recorded in a late autumn 2011 stint in a seaside cabin in Hvalfjörður, western Iceland.

== Discography ==
=== Albums ===
- Við Og Við (2007)
- Innundir skinni (2010)
- Sudden Elevation (2013)
- Palme (2014)
- Palma (2014, Icelandic language version exclusive to Pledge Music)
- Spíra (2025)

=== EPs ===
- Ölof Sings (Sept. 2011)
- The Matador EP (Oct. 2013)

=== Singles ===
- 7" Maria Bethânia/Sveitin milli sanda (August 2009)
- 7" Innundir skinni/Close My Eyes (June 2010)
- 7" Crazy Car/Sukiyaki (September 2010)
- 7" Surrender/Instans (March 2011)
