= Innundir skinni =

Studio album by Ólöf Arnalds
- Released: September 13, 2010
- Recorded: 2009 at Sundlaugin
- Genre: Folk
- Length: 32:31
- Label: One Little Indian
- Producer: Kjartan Sveinsson

Ólöf Arnalds chronology
Við Og Við (2007)	Innundir skinni (2010)	Sudden Elevation (2013)

Singles from Innundir skinni
- 1. "Innundir skinni" Released: 28 June 2010; 2. "Crazy Car" Released: 6 September 2010; 3. "Surrender" Released: 7 March 2011

Professional ratings
Review scores
Source	Rating
SPIN	8/10 stars

Innundir skinni is Icelandic musician Ólöf Arnalds second album. The album was produced by Sigur Rós band member Kjartan Sveinsson, who also worked with Arnalds on her debut album. Skúli Sverrisson, Davið Þór Jónsson, Björk and Shahzad Ismaily all contributed to the album.

Innundir skinni was the first single from the album and was released on June 28, 2010. A music video was released for the song, directed by Asdís Sif Gunnarsdóttir.

The album was originally titled Ókídókí.

== Track listing ==
Adapted from Amazon.

1. "Vinur minn" – 2:09
2. "Innundir skinni" – 2:55
3. "Crazy car" – 3:21
4. "Vinkonur" – 4:00
5. "Svif birki" – 2:31
6. "Jonathan" – 3:52
7. "Madrid" – 4:52
8. "Surrender" – 5:23 (duet with Björk)
9. "Allt i guddi" – 3:28
