= Megas =

Icelandic musical artist (1945–2026)

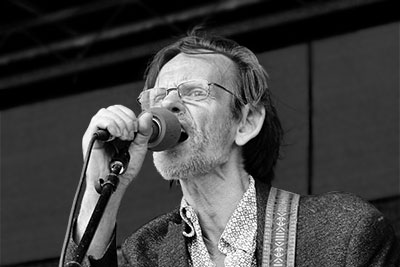
- Megas (2011)

Background information
- Also known as: Megas
- Born: Magnús Þór Jónsson; 7 April 1945; Reykjavík, Iceland
- Died: 6 July 2026 (aged 81)
- Occupation: Singer–songwriter
- Instrument: Vocals

Magnús Þór Jónsson (7 April 1945 – 6 July 2026), better known by the stage name Megas, was an Icelandic vocalist, songwriter, and writer.

== Childhood and interest in music (1945–1970) ==
Being an admirer of Elvis Presley, Megas welcomed the arrival of rock & roll to Iceland by 1956, although his interest in music had to be postponed while he attended grammar school in 1960.

While he was young, he studied piano and explored the Arts: he painted, wrote short stories for his school, and published the sheet music and lyrics to 14 songs by 1968, many of which would be released on his first records. As a young bohemian writer, he was inspired by Bob Dylan and Ray Davies, and embarked into songwriting.

== Music career ==
=== First release and controversy (1970s) ===
At the beginning of the 1970s, his music was not mainstream, as Megas only performed to his left-wing friends. However, in 1972, Icelandic students in Oslo, Norway helped him release his first album, in which his satirical lyrics were accompanied by acoustic music played by Norwegian folk musicians. This caused controversy and his music was banned by the Icelandic national radio, but Megas attained a cult following in the growing alternative scene. However, Megas struggled with releasing new records. Instead, in 1973 he published the words to some of his music in three books.

When his lyrics were performed by the band Judas in 1975, Megas managed to reach a broader audience. He then released his two next albums: Millilending (1975) and Fram og aftur blindgötuna (1976). He challenged Icelandic society's taboos with references made to classical literature and a sarcastic revisionist history. Despite the jarring nature of these records, his use of prose and the Icelandic language influenced the country's rock and roll scene.

In 1977, Megas released Á bleikum náttkjólum with the accompaniment of Spilverk þjóðanna, a popular folk-rock band in Iceland. Critics revered the album, with some calling it the greatest Icelandic album and claiming that it features the first Icelandic punk song. By the end of the seventies, Megas was perceived as a provocateur, and his important role in the Icelandic rock scene turned him into a reference for future artists.

After releasing a children's song album and a double live album, he withdrew from the Icelandic music and started working as a dock worker and graduated from arts school.

=== Returning to music (1983–1990s) ===
By 1983, Megas reappeared in the Icelandic music scene by collaborating with other bands and playing as a guest musicians on several albums.

Around 1985, he joined Kukl, titled "MegaKukl" and toured Iceland, but the songs still remain unreleased. After seven years of absence, his solo career was resumed in 1986 with the release of Í góðri trú.

In 1990 Megas released Hættuleg hljómsveit & glæpakvendið Stella, and started a new project music with Kukl members called Hættuleg hljómsveit (A Dangerous Band), featuring singer Björk as backing vocalist.

=== Legacy and collaborations (2000s–2026) ===
Megas has remained one of the most important Icelandic artists, being considered the father of Icelandic rock and acclaimed for his prolific and, sometimes controversial works. his complete discography up to 1990 was reissued in 2002, remastered and with bonus tracks.
More recently, he joined Súkkat to create a new project called "Megasukk" and released Hús Datt, their debut album in 2005.

Some of the artists that have worked with Megas are the following: Björgvin Gíslason, Guðlaugur Kristinn Óttarsson, Páll Valsson, Þórður Magnússon, and Þórunn Valdimarsdóttir, among many others.

== Death ==
Megas died on 6 July 2026, at the age of 81.

== In popular culture ==
Megas is mentioned in the song "Iceland" by The Fall which appeared on Hex Enduction Hour (1982). In a Melody Maker article about The Fall's stay in Iceland, Megas is referenced:

Our hosts play us tapes of a man with a cracked voice and a Dylanish air and describe him as “the father of Icelandic rock’n’roll”. And they tell us the story of Megas, who ridiculed the sacred Sagas of the land, wrote scathing, surreal lyrics, got heavily into booze and drugs, was barred from radio and shunned by society. In 1979 he released a double album called “Plans For Suicide” announced his retirement, and hasn't performed in public since he's now a dock worker. Mark Smith is entranced by the story, and rivetted by the music. The following day Megas, a pale, gaunt figure, turns up at The Fall's concert at the Austurbæjarbíó and shakes him by the hand. Mark will return to England clutching a parcel of Megas records under his arm.

== Discography ==
Solo:

- 1972 – Megas (MGAB 720601), re-release in 2002 with bonus tracks.
- 1975 – Millilending (Demant D1-002), re-release in 2002 with bonus tracks.
- 1976 – Fram og aftur blindgötuna (Hrím hf D1-005), re-release in 2002 with bonus tracks.
- 1977 – Á bleikum náttkjólum (Iðunn 002), with Spilverk Þjóðanna, re-release in 2002 with bonus tracks.
- 1978 – Nú er ég klæddur og kominn á ról (Iðunn 004), re-release in 2002 with bonus tracks.
- 1979 – Drög að sjálfsmorði (Iðunn 008–09), live album recorded 1978.
- 1985 – Megas allur, box set with all previous albums and two bonus LP's with rare and unreleased tracks.
- 1986 – Í góðri trú (Hitt leikhúsið HITT 011), re-release in 2002 with bonus tracks.
- 1987 – Loftmynd, re-release in 2002 with bonus tracks.
- 1988 – Höfuðlausnir, re-release in 2002 with bonus tracks.
- 1990 – Hættuleg hljómsveit & glæpakvendið Stella (Megas), re-release in 2006 with bonus tracks.
- 1992 – Þrír blóðdropar, re-release in 2006 with bonus tracks.
- 1993 – Paradísarfuglinn, best-of compilation.
- 1994 – Drög að Upprisu (Japis), live album by Megas and Nýdönsk recorded 1993, re-release in 2006 with bonus tracks.
- 1996 – Til hamingju með fallið
- 1997 – Fláa veröld
- 2000 – Svanasöngur á leiði
- 2001 – Far... þinn veg
- 2001 – Haugbrot
- 2002 – Englaryk í tímaglasi, re-release of Bláir draumar (1988) with bonus tracks.
- 2002 – Megas 1972–2002, best-of compilation.
- 2002 – (Kristilega kærleiksblómin spretta í kringum) hitt og þetta, a bonus CD with Megas 1972–2002 with rare and unreleased tracks.
- 2006 – Passíusálmar í Skálholti (Tindur), live album recorded 2001.
- 2006 – Greinilegur púls, live album recorded with Hættuleg hljómsveit 1991.
- 2007 – Frágangur, with Senuþjófarnir.
- 2007 – Hold er mold, with Senuþjófarnir.
- 2008 – Á morgun, with Senuþjófarnir.
- 2009 – Segðu ekki frá (með lífsmarki), live album with Senuþjófarnir, recorded in 2007.
- 2011 – (Hugboð um) Vandræði, with Senuþjófarnir.
- 2011 – Aðför að lögum, with Strengir.
- 2013 – Jeppi á fjalli, with Bragi Valdimar Skúlason.

As Megasukk:

- 2005 – Hús Datt

Tribute albums:

- 1997 – Megasarlög by various artists.
- 2006 – Pældu í því sem pælandi er í by various artists.
- 2006 – Magga Stína syngur Megas by Magga Stína

== Bibliography ==
- 1968 – Megas I (Megas), reprinted in 1973.
- 1968 – Megas II (Megas), reprinted in 1973.
- 1973 – Megas III (Megas).
- 1991 – Textar (Almenna bókafélagið).
- 1989 – Sól í Norðurmýri: Píslarsaga úr Austurbæ together with Þórunn Valdimarsdóttir, reprinted in 1993.
- 1994 – Björn og Sveinn eða makleg málagjöld (Mál og menning).
- 2012 – Megas: Textar 1966–2011 (Reykjavík: JPV).

=== Related bibliography ===
- Rokksaga Íslands, by Gestur Guðmundsson. Forlagið (1990).
