= Björk (album) =

Studio album by Björk Guðmundsdóttir
- Released: December 1977
- Recorded: August–September 1977
- Studios: Hljóðriti Studios, Reykjavík
- Genre: Novelty
- Length: 31:55
- Language: Icelandic
- Label: Fálkinn

Björk Guðmundsdóttir chronology
Björk (1977)	Gling-Gló (1990)

Björk is the only studio album by Icelandic singer Björk as a child singer, released on December 18, 1977, by Fálkinn. In 1976, Björk appeared on Icelandic radio singing "I Love to Love" through the music school she attended, which led her to a record deal and the release, with the help of stepfather Sævar, of her first solo album in 1977.

The album is considered to be juvenilia work and it is not included in the singer's official solo discography, hence the 1993 release Debut is widely considered to be Björk's first studio album.

== Background ==
The songs were a mixture of covers translated into Icelandic, like The Beatles' "The Fool on the Hill" ('Álfur Út Úr Hól'), Edgar Winter's "Alta Mira", Melanie Safka's "Christopher Robin" ('Bænin') and Stevie Wonder's song "Your Kiss Is Sweet" ('Búkolla'), but it also contained some songs written specifically for the album, like the song "Arabadrengurinn" ('The Arab Boy') written by stepfather Sævar, and one instrumental recorder-tribute to Icelandic painter Jóhannes Kjarval, written and performed by 11-year-old Björk.

Björk was offered the chance to do a second album, but she turned it down. With the money she earned she bought herself a piano and started composing new songs of her own.

The album was released in two formats, vinyl and cassette, in fairly limited edition (at least 7000 copies) and is rare outside of Iceland.

It was recorded at Hljóðriti Studios in Reykjavík. Hildur Hauksdóttir (Björk's mother) designed the cover and the photo was taken at a local Reykjavík studio.

== Critical reception ==
Professional ratings
Review scores
Source	Rating
AllMusic	1.5/5 stars

AllMusic critic Joslyn Layne gave the album a negative review, stating: "Novelty value can only carry an album so far, and even covers of Stevie Wonder's 'Your Kiss Is Sweet', sung in Icelandic, and the Beatles' 'The Fool on the Hill' will probably not be enough to keep you laughing, or interested for the duration."

== Track listing ==
No.	Title	Writer(s)	Length
1.	"Arabadrengurinn (The Arab Boy)"	Sævar Árnason; Björgvin Hólm	5:27
2.	"Búkolla (Your Kiss Is Sweet)"	Stevie Wonder; Syreeta Wright; Björgvin Hólm	3:30
3.	"Alta Mira"	Edgar Winter; Björgvin Hólm	2:42
4.	"Jóhannes Kjarval"	Björk Guðmundsdóttir	2:34
5.	"Fúsi Hreindýr"	Björgvin Gíslason; Björgvin Hólm	3:44
6.	"Himnaför"	Björgvin Hólm	2:41
7.	"Óliver"	Jóhann Helgason; Björgvin Hólm	2:52
8.	"Álfur Út Úr Hól (The Fool on the Hill)"	Lennon–McCartney; Björgvin Hólm	3:16
9.	"Músastiginn"	Björgvin Gíslason	2:55
10.	"Bænin (Christopher Robin)"	Melanie Safka; Kolbrún Jónsdóttir	2:14
Total length:			31:55

== Releases ==
- Fálkinn FA – 006 – 12" Vinyl
- Fálkinn FA – 006 – 4 – Cassette
