= Gling-Gló =

Studio album by Björk Guðmundsdóttir & tríó Guðmundar Ingólfssonar
- Released: October 1990
- Recorded: 23 August, 1 and 3 September 1990
- Studio: Stúdio Sýrland
- Genre: Vocal jazz
- Length: 50:39
- Labels: Smekkleysa; One Little Independent Records (re-release)
- Producer: Tómas Tómasson

Björk chronology
Björk (1977)	Gling-Gló (1990)	Debut (1993)

Professional ratings
Review scores
Source	Rating
All About Jazz	3.5/5 stars
AllMusic	2.5/5 stars
Rolling Stone	3/5 stars

Gling-Gló is the only studio album by Björk Guðmundsdóttir & tríó Guðmundar Ingólfssonar, consisting of Björk Guðmundsdóttir on vocals, Guðmundur Ingólfsson on piano, Guðmundur Steingrímsson on drums, and Þórður Högnason on bass. The album's title "Gling-gló" is the Icelandic equivalent of the English onomatopoeia "ding dong", referring to the sound that a bell makes.

Most of the songs were recorded on 1 September and 3 September 1990 at Stúdio Sýrland, except for two tracks, which were recorded on 23 August 1990. It was produced by Tómas Magnús Tómasson, the bassist of Stuðmenn. The album was released in October 1990 by Smekkleysa. It received mixed reviews by critics.

== Background and recording ==
Most of the songs were recorded on 1 September and 3 September 1990 at Stúdio Sýrland. "Ruby Baby" and "I Can't Help Loving that Man" were recorded on 23 August 1990 on Ríkisútvarpið (National Icelandic Broadcasting Service) for Djasskaffi, a radio programme hosted by Ólafur Þórðarsson. It was produced by Tómas Magnús Tómasson, the bassist of Stuðmenn.

== Composition ==
Most of the songs are sung in Icelandic. Several of these songs are covers of jazz standards translated and sung in Icelandic. Three are sung with a noticeably different musical arrangement: "Bílavísur" (originally "The Blacksmith Blues"), "Ég veit ei hvað skal segja" (Theresa Brewer's "Ricochet Romance") and "Pabbi minn" ("O Mein Papa").

"Þad sést ekki sætari mey" is misattributed in the liner notes as a "Rodgers & Hammerstein" composition, but is instead an interpolation of Irving Berlin's "You Can't Get a Man with a Gun" from the musical Annie Get Your Gun.

== Track listing ==
No.	Title	Writer(s)	English translation (Note: English translations not official.)	Length
1.	"Gling gló"	Alfreð Clausen; Kristín Engilbertsdóttir	"Ding Dong"	2:43
2.	"Luktar-Gvendur"	Nat Simon; Eiríkur Eiríksson	"Lantern-Gvendur"	4:03
3.	"Kata rokkar"	Theodór Einarsson	"Kata rocks"	2:58
4.	"Pabbi minn"	Paul Burkhard; Þorsteinn Sveinsson	"My papa"	2:42
5.	"Brestir og brak"	Jón Múli Árnason; Jónas Árnason	"Crackle and bang"	3:20
6.	"Ástartöfrar"	Valdimar Auðunsson	"Love magic"	2:46
7.	"Bella símamær"	Mark Fontenoy; Loftur Guðmundsson	"Bella the phone girl"	2:39
8.	"Litli tónlistarmaðurinn"	Freymóður Jóhannsson	"The little musician"	3:25
9.	"Það sést ekki sætari mey"	Irving Berlin (Note: Sleeve mentions "Lag: Rodgers And Hammerstein" as the songwriters, but the actual composer is Irving Berlin.); Loftur Guðmundsson	"There is no sweeter maiden to be seen"	4:03
10.	"Bílavísur"	Jack Holmes; Jon Sigurðsson	"Traffic signs"	2:40
11.	"Tondeleyo"	Sigfús Halldórsson; Tómas Guðmundsson		3:33
12.	"Ég veit ei hvað skal segja"	Larry Coleman; Joe Darion; Norman Gimbel; Loftur Guðmundsson	"I do not know what to say"	3:05
13.	"Í dansi með þér"	Pablo Beltrán Ruiz; Sveinsson	"In a dance with you"	2:28
14.	"Börnin við tjörnina"	Jenni Jónsson	"The children at the pond"	2:50
Total length:				50:39

Bonus tracks (live radio recordings for Ríkisútvarpið)
No.	Title	Writer(s)	Length
15.	"Ruby Baby"	Jerry Leiber; Mike Stoller	4:06
16.	"I Can’t Help Loving That Man"	Oscar Hammerstein II; Jerome Kern	3:41
Total length:			58:26

Note: The last track on the bonus edition, “I Can’t Help Loving That Man” is also known as “I Can’t Help Loving You” on certain versions of the album.

== Personnel ==
- Björk Guðmundsdóttir – vocals, harmonica
- Guðmundur Ingólfsson – piano, tambourine
- Þórður Högnason – bass
- Guðmundur Steingrímsson – drums, maracas, Christmas bells
- Tómas Magnús Tómasson – production, mixing
- Georg Magnússon – technician (tracks 15, 16)
- Óskar Jónasson – photography, cover

Credits adapted from the liner notes of Gling-Gló.

== Charts ==
=== Weekly charts ===
Chart (1994)	Position
UK Jazz & Blues Albums Chart (OCC)	24

=== Year-end charts ===
Chart (2016)	Position
Icelandic Albums (Plötutíðindi)	32

== Certifications and sales ==
Certifications and sales for Gling-Gló
Region	Certification	Certified units/sales
Iceland	Gold	40,000
