= Íshúsfélag Ísfirðinga =

Icelandic fish company

Coordinates: 66.076497°N 23.123614°W

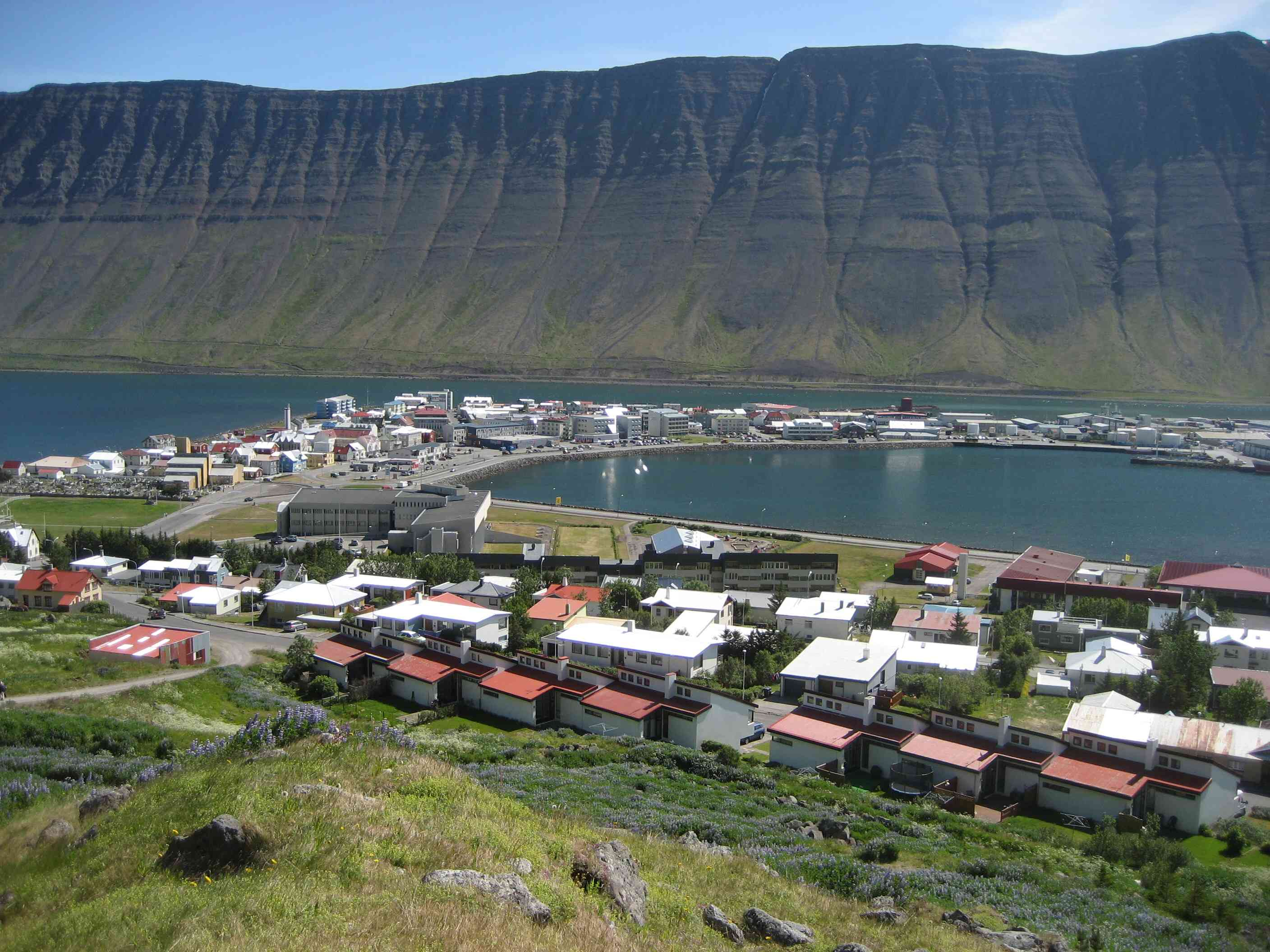
- View of Ísafjörður, Iceland
- Type: Fish processing
- Industry: Fish
- Founded: 7 January 1912; 114 years ago in Ísafjörður, Iceland
- Defunct: 1999; 27 years ago
- Headquarters: Ísafjörður, Iceland
- Products: Frozen fish

Íshúsfélag Ísfirðinga (Ísafjörður Freezing Plant Company) was an Icelandic company that produced frozen fish for export. It was established on 7 January 1912 to store frozen bait, and in the 1930s moved into freezing fish. In 1970 Gunnvör hf. and Hrönn hf. became the main shareholders of the company, and in 1994 Gunnvör acquired almost all the shares of the company. In 1999 Gunnvör hf. and Hraðfystihúsið hf. in Hnífsdalur merged under the name Hraðfrystihúsið Gunnvör hf., and Íshúsfélag Ísfirðinga became part of that company.

== 1911–12: Foundation ==
Shipowners in Ísafjörður began to discuss formation of a public company to build an ice house to freeze and store bait for the fishing fleet in the fall of 1911. A meeting was held on 7 January 1912 at which it was agreed that the company should be a joint venture. 30 shareholders subscribed a total of ISK 4,700 at the meeting, and a board of directors was appointed to supervise construction of the ice house according to plans reviewed at the meeting. Construction was to be accelerated so ice could be stored in this first winter. The main purpose was to freeze and store herring and other bait, as well as to store food for people of the town and other customers. The company was allocated a plot at Fjarðarstræti, where the ice house was soon built.

== 1912–37: From frozen bait to frozen fish ==
In the first few years of operations, as soon as ice had formed in the ponds, rivers and streams the ice was cut and transported to the ice house in a so-called snow box. The company bought its first freezer in 1929. In 1934 a new limited liability cod and herring fishing company named Huginn was launched under the leadership of Björgvin Bjarnason, with the participation of several fishing industry companies in Ísafjörður, including Íshúsfélag Ísfirðinga, Íshúsfélagið Jökul and Vélbátaábyrgðarfélag Ísfirðinga. Huginn had three boats built in Denmark, Huginn I, II and III. The first two were delivered in 1934 and the third the next year.

During the Great Depression there was a fall in Icelandic fish sales. The Fisheries Commission was created in 1934 to initiate innovation in the industry. The commission encouraged fishermen to start quick-freezing their catch and began to research the market for frozen fish. The salt fish markets in Spain closed during the Spanish Civil War (1936–39). Íshúsfélag Ísfirðinga refurbished and renovated its freezers in 1936, and the company began shipment of frozen fillets to the United States in 1936–40. Three ice houses, Íshúsfélag Ísfirðinga, Jökull and Gláma, merged in 1937 under the name of the first and quickly established a fast freezing operation. The company changed from a medium-sized operation that mostly supplied frozen bait to the local fishing fleet to a larger company that prepared food for foreign markets.

== Later mergers and acquisitions ==
In 1943 a group led by Guðjóns E. Jónssonar, a bank branch manager, acquired the majority of the company's share capital, which they held for several years. Böðvar Sveinbjarnarson and Jón Kjartansson then bought the company, which they managed until 1952, when it was sold to an Ísafjörður buyer. In 1957 five companies in the town each bought 1/6 of the company, leaving 1/6 with the former owner. These were Gunnvör hf., Hrönn hf., Samvinnufélag Ísfirðinga, Magni hf. and Togaraútgerð Ísafjarðar hf. The acquisition by dynamic fishing fleet owners marked a transformation of the fishing industry.

A substantial new building at Eyrargötu was opened in 1962. The next year the output of the company increased significantly, and in the later 1960s was processing 4,000 to 6,000 tons of fish per year. About 1970 Gunnvör hf. and Hrönn hf. became the main owners of the company. Raw materials for processing came from these owners and from the trawlers of Júlíusin Geirmundssyni and Guðbjörgu. In the 1970s these rose to 8,000 to 12,000 tons of fish per year, and the freezer house was expanded considerably. A prototype sampling machine was tested by the company in the autumn of 1980, and production of the machine began in 1981.

The company saw a steep drop in processing in the 1980s. In 1990 it produced about 3,000 tons of frozen fillets from 7,000 to 8,000 tons of raw materials. In April 1991 Páll Pétursson of Coldwater gave a quality award to Íshúsfélag Ísfirðinga. The plant was highly productive and also had high quality levels. It had made the ICELANDIC brand well known for quality. From the start of 1990 Íshúsfélagið began fishing in partnership with other Hafdís line boat partners. In 1994, Gunnvör acquired almost all of the company's share capital. In December 1994 Íshúsfélag Ísafjarðar and three other fishing and fish processing companies bought the 292-ton trawler Klara Sveinsdóttir SU 50, with a quota of about 1,400 tonnes. In April 1995 they sold it to a Chinese shipowner based in New Zealand. By the late 1990s the fishing industry had suffered further declines, and the Ísafjörður, Norðurtanginn and Íshúsfélag Ísafjörður freezing houses closed down.

According to the Gunnvör hf. 2000 news release on its 1999 operations, in 1998 the company had a profit of ISK 39 million, rising to ISK 54 million in 1999. In 1999 the company had good results in salmon and whales, and poor results in shrimping. About 190 people worked at the Gunnvör hf. freezing station. The merger with Hraðfrystihúsin hf. to form Hraðfrystihúsið – Gunnvör hf. was approved in September that year. Íshúsfélag Ísfirðinga hf. was merged into the company in December 1999.

== Sources ==
- Guðfinna M. Hreiðarsdóttir (2016), Saga Pólsins (in Icelandic), Pólinn
- Gunnvör hf. (25 February 2000), Frétt um afkomu Hraðfrystihússins – Gunnvarar hf. 1999 (in Icelandic), Nordic Exchange
- Hafþór Hreidarsson (4 January 2014), "Klara Sveinsdóttir", Ships Hafþórs Hreidar (in Icelandic)
- Hraðfrystihúsið – Gunnvör hf. (10 January 2012), Öld frá stofnun Íshúsfélags Ísfirðinga hf. (in Icelandic)
- Jón Þ. Þór (1992), Saga Íshúsfélags Ísfirðinga 1912–1992 (in Icelandic), Isafjordur
- Sigurgeir Guðjónsson (2017), Saga vélstjórastéttarinnar á Íslandi (in Icelandic), VM, $$c 2017., ISBN 978-9935-24-102-3
- Öld frá stofnun Íshúsfélagsins (in Icelandic), Visir.is
- Úlfar Ágústsson (3 May 1991), "Verðlaunahafar Coldwater: Íshúsfélag Ísfirðinga hlýtur gæðaverðlaun Sjö önnur", Morgunblaðið
- Þórhalli S Gjöveraa (13 October 2016), "Huginn ll ÍS 92. TFCK", thsof (in Icelandic), 123.is
