= Tjöruhúsið (restaurant) =

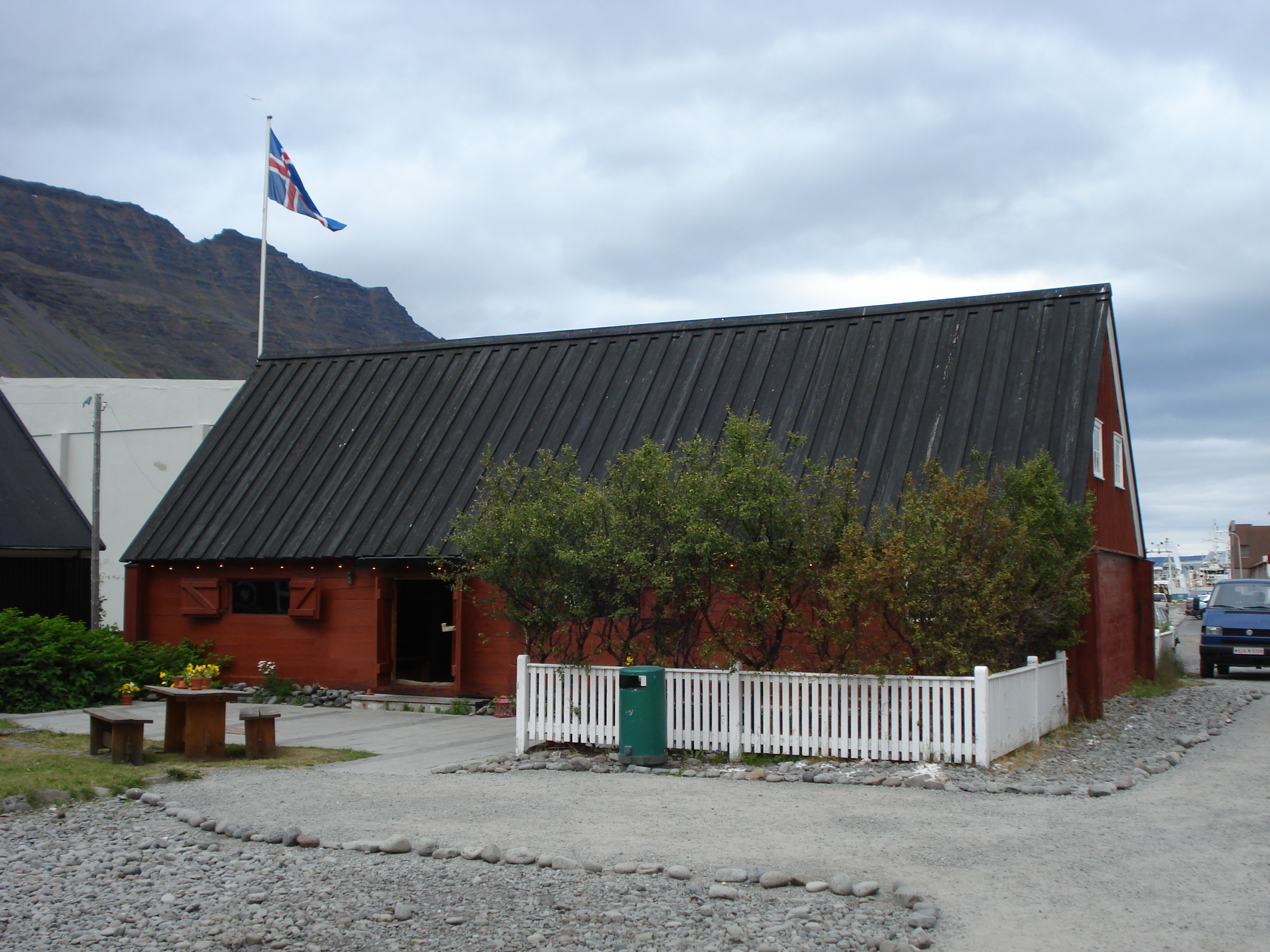
- Interactive map of Tjöruhúsið

Restaurant information
- Owner: Tjöruhúsið ehf.
- Food type: Seafood
- Location: Neðstikaupstaður, Ísafjörður, Iceland
- Coordinates: 66.0682223°N 23.1272701°W

Tjöruhúsið is an Icelandic seafood restaurant in Ísafjörður, Iceland. Located in a house by the same name in Neðstikaupstaður, the oldest cluster of houses in Iceland, it was originally operated as a coffee shop during the summer months. In 2004, Magnús Hauksson took over the business at the behest of the town council and soon started to offer seafood menu and increased the opening time from easter to October.

== Visitors ==
In 2010, Tjöruhúsið was visited by British celebrity chef Heston Blumenthal and in 2021 by Russian billionaire Andrey Melnichenko.
