= Aldrei fór ég suður =

Annual music festival in Ísafjörður, Iceland

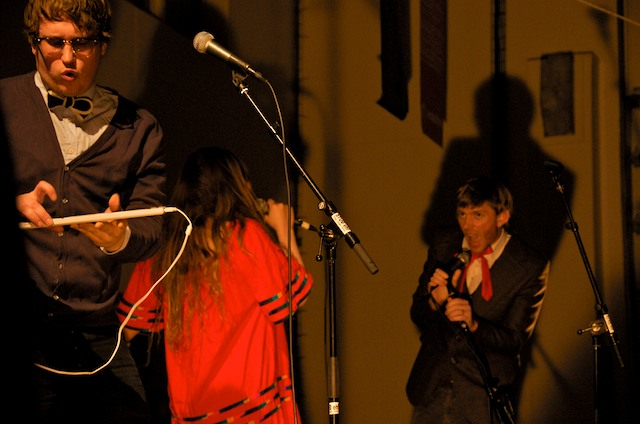
- FM Belfast at the festival in April 2009
- Dates: Easter weekend
- Locations: Ísafjörður, Iceland
- Years active: 2004–present
- Founders: Mugison and Papamug
- Website: aldrei.is

Aldrei fór ég suður (transl. I never went south) is an annual music festival held in Ísafjörður, Iceland, every Easter weekend since 2004. It is the brainchild of Mugison and his father, Guðmundur Kristjánsson, who came up with the idea after playing on a music festival in London in 2003, and is named after Bubbi Morthens song of the same name. Since its establishment, there has never been an entry fee to the festival and the bands do not get paid.

The festival is broadcast nationally live on Rás 2 and RÚV.

In 2020, the festival was only broadcast on TV and on the internet due to the coronavirus pandemic in Iceland.

== Notable artists ==
- Bubbi Morthens
- Emiliana Torrini
- FM Belfast
- Gruff Rhys
- Hatari
- Laddi
- Maus
- Mugison
- Sigur Rós
- Of Monsters and Men

== Past artists ==
=== 2025 ===
- Amor Vincit Omnia
- Apparat organ quartet
- FM Belfast
- Geðbrigði
- Gosi
- Írafár
- Jói Pé og Króli
- Múr
- Reykjavík
- Salome Katrín
- Una Torfa

=== 2024 ===
- Birnir
- Bogomil Font
- Celebs
- Dr. Gunni
- Emmsjé Gauti
- GDRN
- Helgi Björnsson
- Hipsumhaps
- Inspector Spacetime
- Mugison
- Nanna
- Of Monster and men
- Spacestation
- Vampíra

=== 2023 ===
- Árný Margrét
- Bríet
- FM Belfast
- Fókus
- Gróa
- Kvikindi
- Los Bomboneros
- Ragga Gísla
- Russian Girls
- Siggi Björns
- Una Torfa
- Vintage Caravan

=== 2022 ===
- Aron Can
- Bríet
- Celebs
- Flott
- Gugusar
- Hermigervill
- Inspector Spacetime
- Kusk
- Moses Hightower
- Mugison og Cauda Collective
- Páll Óskar
- Salóme Katrín og Rakel
- Skrattar
- Sólstafir

=== 2021 ===
The festival was cancelled due to the COVID-19 pandemic

=== 2020 ===
The festival was held online due to the COVID-19 pandemic

- Auður
- Árný Margrét
- Between Mountains
- Cell 7
- Eivör
- Helgi Björns
- Hermigervill
- Hipsumhaps
- Kk
- K.Óla
- Kælan Mikla
- Lay Low
- Moses Hightower
- Mugison Og Rúna
- Prins Póló
- Ragnar Zolberg
- Salóme Katrín
- Sigga Toll Og Góskar
- Skúli Mennski
- Snorri Helga

=== 2019 ===
- Blóðmör
- Dj Gummi Bæjó
- Teitur Magnússon
- Dj Yordanova
- Hórmónar
- Dj Díana
- Þormóður // Herra Hnetusmjör // Jói Pé & Króli
- Dj Blómey
- Todmobile
- Dj Herra Hammond
- Auðn
- Berndsen
- Gosi
- Dj Sindri Páll
- Bagdad Brothers
- Dj Kolbrún Elma
- Salóme Katrín
- Dj Melli
- Svala
- Dj Matthildur
- Mammút
- Dj Ásrós
- Ayia
- Jónas Sig

=== 2018 ===
- Ateria
- Mantra
- Between Mountains
- Friðrik Dór
- Une Misére
- Kolrassa
- Dimma
- Kuldabboli/Mugison
- Cyber
- Auður
- Birnir og Joey Christ
- 200.000 Naglbítar
- Hatari
- Á Móti Sól

=== 2017 ===
- Emmsé Gauti
- Valdimar
- Rythmatik
- Between Mountains
- Börn
- Lúðrasveit Ísafjarðar
- Vök
- Hildur
- Kött Grá Pje
- KK Band
- Karó
- Soffía
- Ham
- Mugison

=== 2016 ===
- Apollo
- Laddi
- Mamma Hestur
- Strigaskórnr 42
- Úlfur Úlfur
- GKR
- Glowie
- Tonik Ensembla
- Sykur
- Agent Fresco
- Emiliana Torrini
- Risaeðlan

=== 2015 ===
- Guðrið Hansdóttir
- Himbrimi
- Valdimar Guðmundsson
- Júníus Meyvant
- Saga Garðars
- Hugleikur Dagsson
- Kæsti Safírinn
- Hemúllinn
- Agent Fresco
- Futuregrapher
- Rhytmatik
- Prins Póló
- Amaba Dama
- Mugison
- Pink Street Boys
- Emmsé Gauti
- Boogie Trouble

=== 2014 ===
- Cell7
- Contalgen Funeral
- Dj. Flugvél og geimskip
- Dusty Miller
- Grísalappalísa
- Helgi Björnsson og stórsveit Vestfjarða
- Hemúllinn
- Hermigervill
- Highlands
- Hjaltalín
- Kaleo
- Kött Grá Pje
- Lína Langsokkur
- Lón
- Mammút
- Markús and the Diversion Sessions
- Maus
- Retro Stefson
- Rythmatik
- Rúnar Þórisson
- Vio - (Sigurvegarar músíktilrauna 2014)
- Snorri Helgason
- Soffía Björg
- Solar
- Sólstafir
- Þórunn Arna Kristjánsdóttir og búgíband Skúla mennska

=== 2013 ===
- Abbababb
- Blind Bargain
- Borkó
- Bubbi Morthens
- Dolby
- Athygli
- Fears
- Futuregrapher
- Hörmung
- Jónas Sig
- Langi Seli og skuggarnir
- Lára Rúnars
- Monotown
- Mugison
- Ojba Rasta
- Oyama
- Prinspóló
- Ragga Gísla og Fjallabræður
- Rythmatik
- Samaris
- Sin Fang
- Skúli Mennski
- Sniglabandið
- Stafrænn Hákon
- Valdimar
- Ylja

=== 2012 ===
- Klysja
- Dúkkulísur
- Sykur
- Pollapönk
- Gudrid Hansdóttir
- Jón Jónsson
- Muck
- Mugison
- Retro Stefson
- Skálmöld
- Áttavilltir
- Cutaways
- Gang Related
- Gógó píur
- Hótel Rotterdam
- Legend
- Orphic oxtra
- Páll Óskar og Sunnukórinn
- Skúli Þórðar
- Svavar Knútur
- The Vintage Caravan
- 701
- Biggibix
- Gísli Pálmi
- HAM
- Ketura
- Lori Kelley
- Nolo
- Postularnir
- Reykjavík!
- Snorri Helgason
- Þórunn Antonía

=== 2011 ===
- Bjartmar og Bergrisarnir
- Benni Sig ásamt Vestfirskum perlum
- Eggert frá Súðavík
- Ensími
- Ég
- FM Belfast
- Grafík
- Jónas Sigurðsson & ritvélar framtíðarinnar
- Klassart
- Lars Duppler frá Þýskalandi
- Lazyblood
- Lifun
- Lúðrasveit T.Í ft. Mugison
- Miri
- Mr. Silla
- Ný dönsk
- Páll Óskar
- Perla Sig.
- Pétur Ben
- Prinspóló
- Quadroplus
- Sokkabandið
- Sóley
- Sólstafir
- Samúel Jón Samúelsson Big Band
- The Vintage Caravan
- U.S.I
- Valdimar
- Virtual motion
- Yoda remote

=== 2010 ===
- Ólöf Arnalds
- Bloodgroup
- Urmull
- Dikta
- Hjaltalín
- Bróðir Svartúlfs
- Lára Rúnars
- Pollapönk
- Mið-ísland
- Lay Low
- Sigríður Thorlacius
- Morðingjarnir
- Hudson Wayne
- Sólinn frá Sandgerði
- Rúnar Þór
- Geirfuglrnir
- Ingó og Veðurguðirnir
- Biggibix
- Orphic Oxtra
- Skúli Mnnski
- Stjörnuryk
- Klikkhausarnir
- Hjálmar
- Rúnar Þóris
- Mugison
- Yxna
- rom Hannay
- Jitney
- Korter í þrjú
- Biogen
- Drengjakórinn Konráð
- Seasar A, BlazRoca og Dj Kocoon
- Nine Elevens
- Óminnishegrar

=== 2009 ===
- Dr. Spock
- Sudden weather change
- Agent fresco
- Sin fang bous
- Reykjavík!
- FM Belfast
- Múm
- Vicky
- Bent moustache
- Klezmer chaos
- Hemmi Gunn og KraftlyftingKlikkhausar
- Stórsveit Vestfjarða
- Skúli Þórðar og Sökudólgarnir
- Stjörnuryk
- Brot
- BIX
- Yxna
- Mugison
- Jóhan Piribauer
- jói701
- Ekki þjóðin
- Þröstur og Þúfutittlingarnir
- Who knew
- Myst
- Dikta
- Blazroca og Sesar A
- Fjallabræður úr Önundarfirði
- The sleeping prophets
- Karl og mennirnir
- Boys in a band
- Ragnar Sólberg

=== 2008 ===
- Abbababb
- Biogen
- Blue Influence
- Bob Justman
- Ben Frost
- Benny Crespos Gang
- Dísa
- Flateyrar Rapp
- Hálfkák
- Hellvar
- Hjaltalín
- Hjálmar
- Hraun
- Johonny Sexual
- Karlakórinn Ernir og Óttar Proppé
- Lára Rúnarsdóttir
- Megas
- Morðingjar
- Múgsefjun
- Mugison
- Mysterious Marta
- Retro Stefson
- Sign
- Skátar
- Skakkamanage
- Sprengjuhöllin
- SSSól
- Steintryggur
- Sudden Weather Change
- Vax
- Vilhelm
- Ultra Mega Techno Bandið Stefán
- XXX Rottweilerhundar

=== 2007 ===
- Kristina Logos
- Xenophobia
- Nosfell (franska sendiráðsbandið)
- Dónadúettinn
- Pétur Ben
- Bógomil Font og Flís
- Mínus
- Slugs
- Presindent Bongo
- Blonde Readhead
- Sökludólgarnir - m. Skúla Þórðar
- Pollapönk
- Jan Mayen
- Sprengjuhöllin
- Æla
- Esja
- Siggi Björs
- Lúðrasveit Tónó og Appollo
- Lay Low
- Benny Crespos Gang
- Ampop
- Reykjavík!
- Fjallabræður
- Ham
- Raftónlistarmaðurinn Charlie
- Bloodgroup
- Dr. Spock
- The Geiri Talent Show
- Þröstur Jóhannesson og
- Skriðurnar
- FM Belfast
- Mugison
- Ólöf Arnalds

=== 2006 ===
- Benni Hemm Hemm
- M. Silla
- Borkó
- Drengjakór Mí
- Hairdoctor
- Jet Black Joe
- Þröstur Jóhannesson
- Kristinn Níelsson
- Lack of Talent
- Weapons
- Jan Mayen
- Hljómsveit Hafdísar Bjarna
- Óli Popp
- I´m Being good
- Kan
- Hermigervill
- Rúnar Þórisson
- NineElevens
- Harmonikufélag Vestfjarða
- Reykjavík!
- Rass
- Prumpison
- Siggi Björns
- jói701

=== 2005 ===
- Villi Valli
- Ghostidigital
- Kimono
- Skátar
- Trabant
- Hudson Wayne
- Lonsome Traveler
- Hraun
- Mugison
- Lack of talent
- Hjálmar
- Reykjavík!
- Þórir
- Gruff Rhys
- Söudólgarnir
- Stafrænn Hákon
- Húsið á Sléttunni
- Borkó
- Tristian
- Siggi Björns
- Appollo
- Írafár
- Egill Sæbjörnsson
- Paul Lydon
- Nine Ellevens

=== 2004 ===
- níu11
- BMX
- Dr. Gunni
- Funerals
- Gjörningaklúbburinn
- Gus Gus
- Haddi Bæjó DJ
- Hudson Wayne
- Jóhann Jóhannsson
- Jói 701
- Kippi Kanínus
- Muggi
- Mugison
- Siggi Björns BigBand
- Singapore Sling
- Skúli Þórðar
- Steindór Andersen
- The Lonsome Traveller
- Trabant
- Tristian
- Dóri Hermanns
- Lára Rúnars
