= Arna Sigríður Albertsdóttir =

Icelandic Para cyclist and cross-country skier (born 1990)

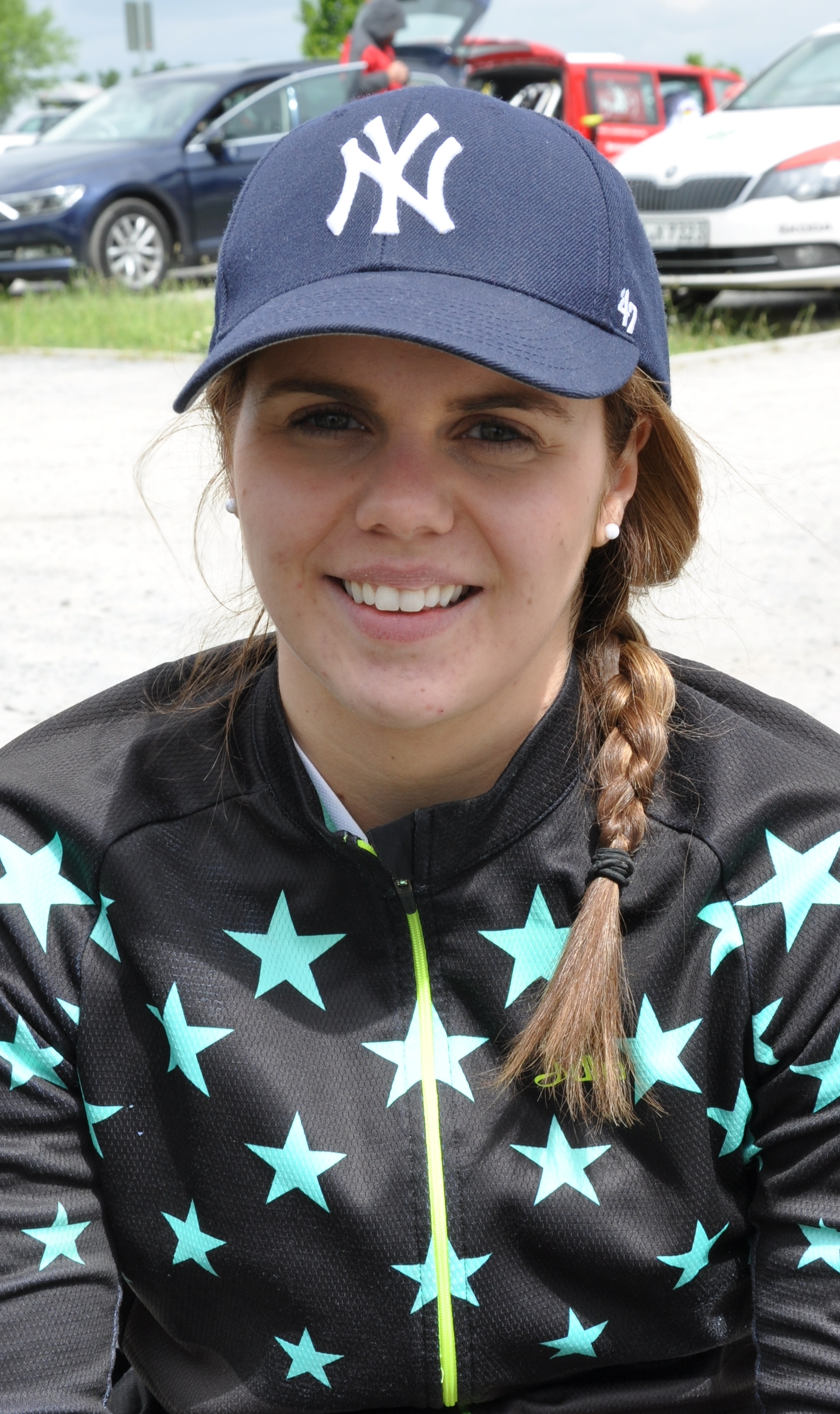
- Arna at German Championships/Europe Cup, 2016

Personal information
- Born: 8 June 1990 (age 36) Ísafjörður, Iceland
- Years active: 2014–present

Sport
- Country: Iceland
- Sport: Para cycling, Para cross-country skiing
- Disability class: H1, LW10

Arna Sigríður Albertsdóttir (born 8 June 1990) is an Icelandic Para cyclist and cross-country skier. Formerly a multi-sport athlete, she took up handcycling after being paralyzed in a skiing accident in 2006. In 2015, she became the first Icelandic athlete to compete in the UCI World Championships and in 2021, she became the first Icelander to participate in handcycling at the Paralympics. In 2026, she became the first Icelander to qualify for Para cross-country skiing at the Paralympics.

== Biography ==
=== Early life ===
Arna was born and raised in Ísafjörður, Iceland. In her youth, she trained football, swimming and skiing. During the summer of 2006, she played for BÍ/Bolungarvík's senior football team in the second-tier 1. deild kvenna.

=== Skiing accident ===
On 30 December 2006, while in a skiing training camp in Geilo, Norway, Arna landed off the track and crashed into a tree, fracturing her spine and paralyzing her below the waist.

=== Handcycling ===
A few years after the accident she moved to Reykjavík and started training under the guidelines of trainer Fannar Karvel. Arna first competed in handcycling in the autumn of 2014. In 2015 she became the first cyclist to represent Iceland at the UCI Para-cycling Road World Championships. On 20 March 2016, she finished first in road race event at a European Handcycling Federation's competition in Abu Dhabi while coming in second in the time trial event.

In August and September 2021, she competed at the 2020 Summer Paralympics in Tokyo, Japan, becoming the first Icelander to compete in handcycling at the Paralympics. In the time trial event on 31 August, she finished 11th. In the road race event on 1 September, Arna finished 15th.

=== Cross-country skiing ===
In February 2026, she became the first Icelander to qualify for Para cross-country skiing at the Paralympics.

== Photos ==
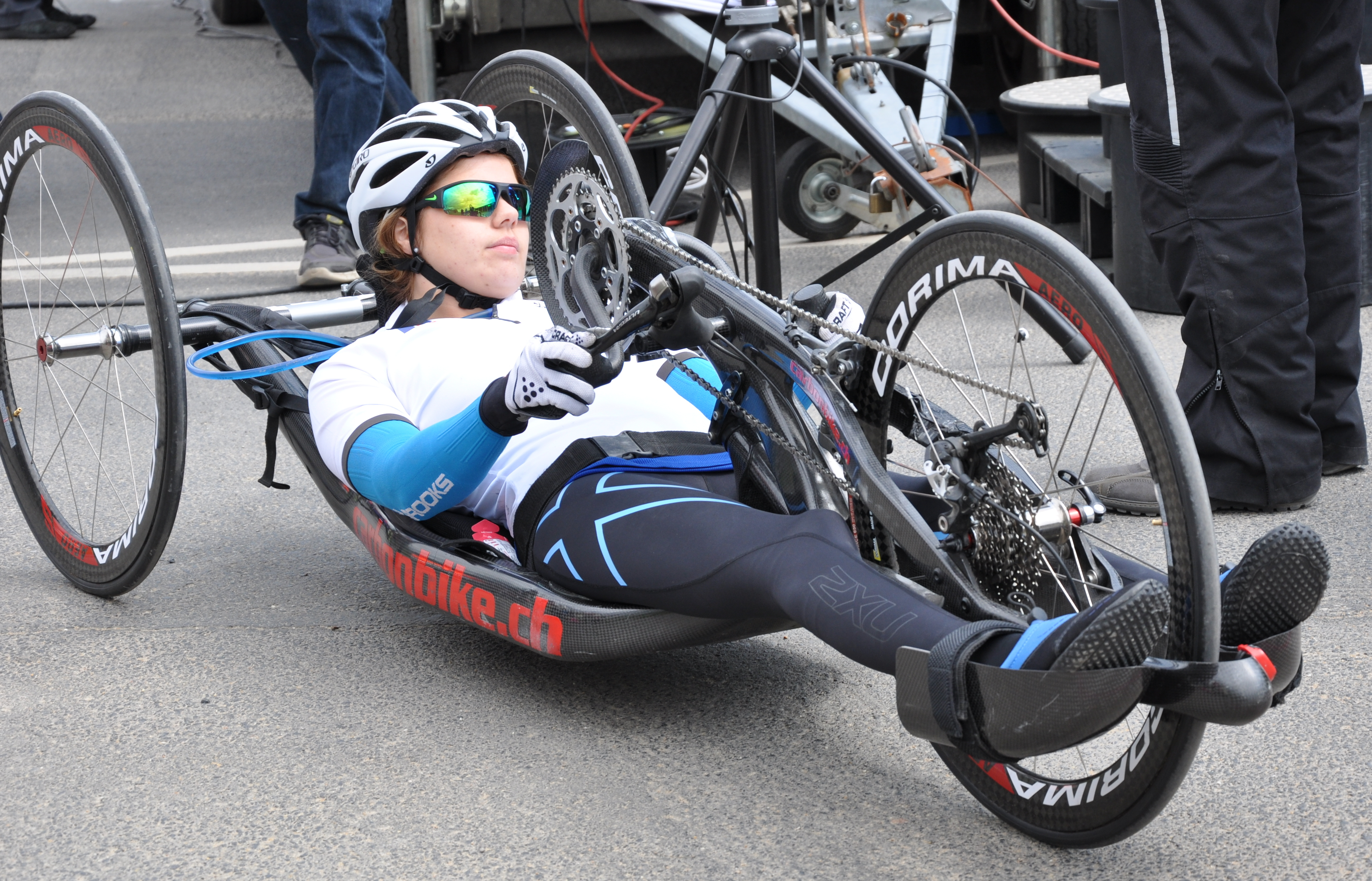
