= Hnífsdalur =

Coordinates: 66°07′N 23°07′W

- Village
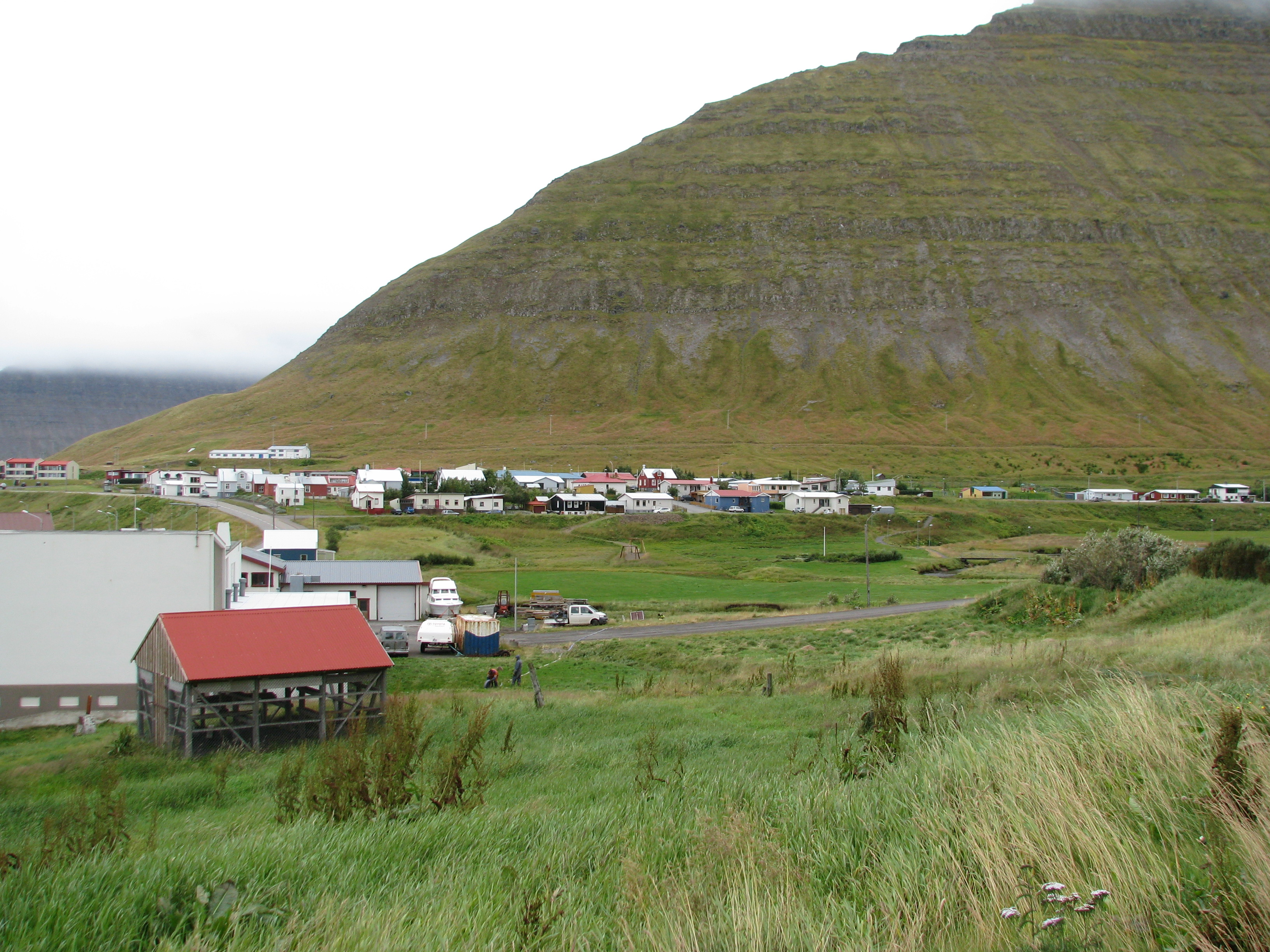
- Hnífsdalur, 2009

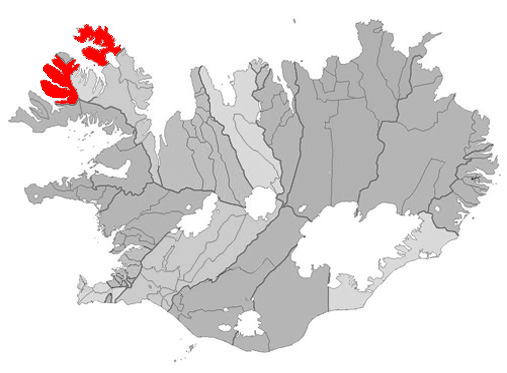
- Location of the Municipality of Ísafjarðarbær

- Location within Iceland
- Country: Iceland
- Constituency: Northwest Constituency
- Region: Westfjords
- Municipality: Ísafjarðarbær

Population (1 January 2024)
  - Total: 210
- Time zone: UTC+0 (GMT)
- Póstnúmer: 410

Hnífsdalur (Icelandic pronunciation: [ˈn̥ifsˌtaːlʏr̥]) is a small village in the municipality of Ísafjarðarbær, located between Bolungarvík and Ísafjörður. The literal meaning of the name is "Knife's Valley". Some guess that the thin or sharp line of the mountain range resembles that of a knife. No mention is made of the place in the Book of Settlement.

== History ==
In 1910 an avalanche killed 20 people in Hnífsdalur, one of the deadliest in Iceland in the 20th century.

On 25 September 2010, Bolungarvíkurgöng, a 5,156 m (16,916 ft) tunnel between Hnífsdalur and neighbouring town Bolungarvík, was opened.
