= Árný Margrét =

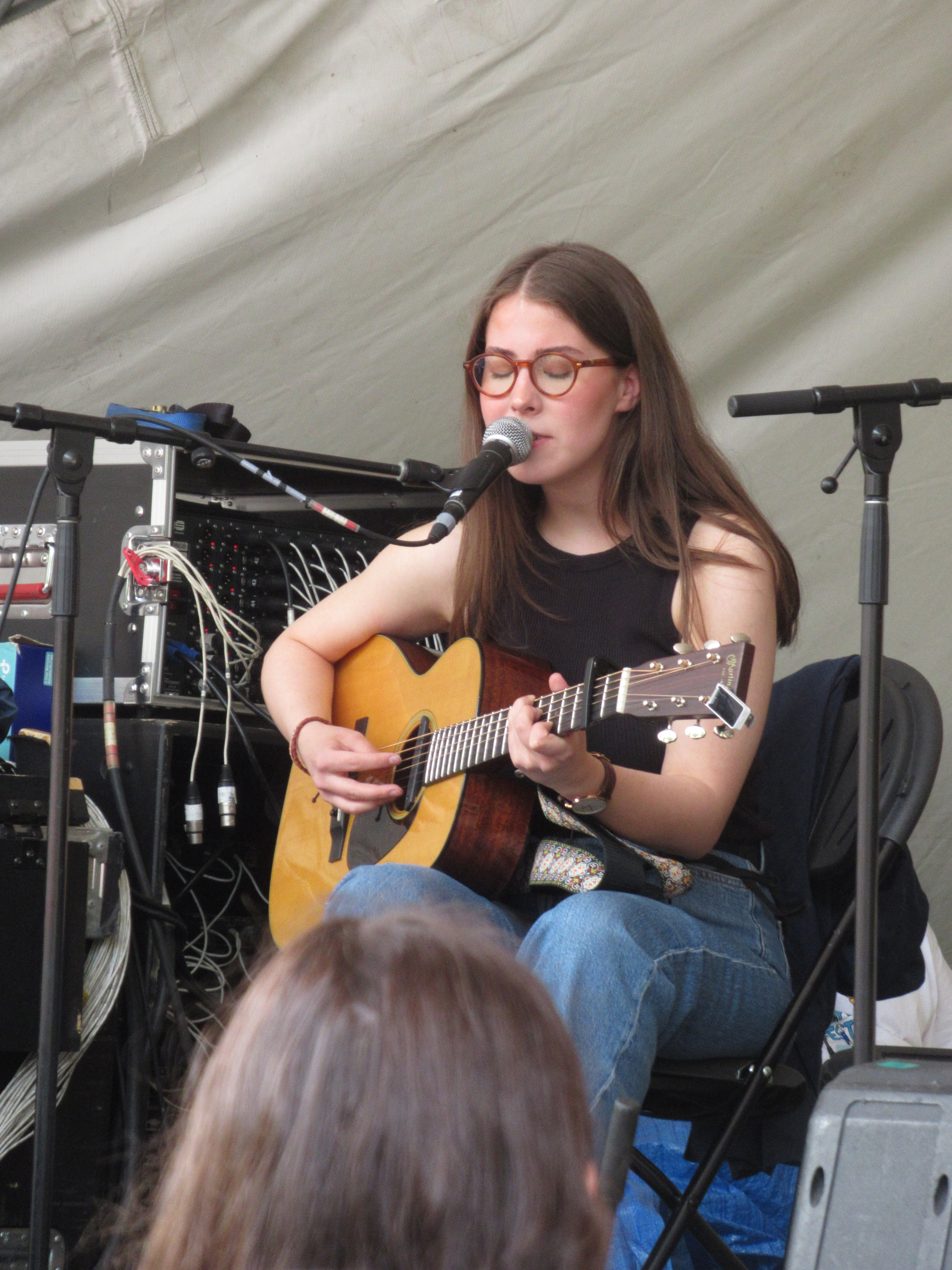
- Árný Margrét performing at the Winnipeg Folk Festival

Background information
- Also known as: Arny Margret
- Born: Árný Margrét Sævarsdóttir; 7 May 2001 (age 25); Ísafjörður, Iceland
- Occupation: Musician
- Instrument: Guitar
- Years active: 2018–present
- Label: One Little Independent Records
- Website: arnymargret.com

Árný Margrét Sævarsdóttir (also stylized without diacritics; born 2001) is an Icelandic musician. In October 2022, she released her debut album They Only Talk About the Weather.

== Early life ==
Árný Margrét Sævarsdóttir was born and grew up in Ísafjörður, Iceland, and started learning the piano at an early age and later the guitar. After graduating high school in the fall of 2020, she moved to Denmark to attend a folk school and practice music. Due to COVID-19 lockdowns, she was unable to return to school for the spring semester and she moved back home to Iceland.

== Career ==
Árný Margrét's first official performance was in 2018. In 2021, she signed with One Little Independent Records. She released her first single, "Intertwined", with the label in December of that year. In January 2022, she debuted her second single, "Akureyri". She released her debut EP, Intertwined, in February 2022. Her first full-length album, They Only Talk About the Weather, was released in October 2022. During the summer of 2023, she performed weekly in the TV show Sumarlandinn on RÚV. During the summer of 2025, she was an opening act for the Crane Wives on their summer tour.

== Discography ==
- They Only Talk About the Weather (2022)
- I Miss You, I Do (2025)

=== EPs ===
- Intertwined (2022)

=== Singles ===
- "Interwined" (2021)
- "Akureyri" (2022)
