= Við Djúpið =

Annual Icelandic music festival

Coordinates: 66°04′N 23°07′W

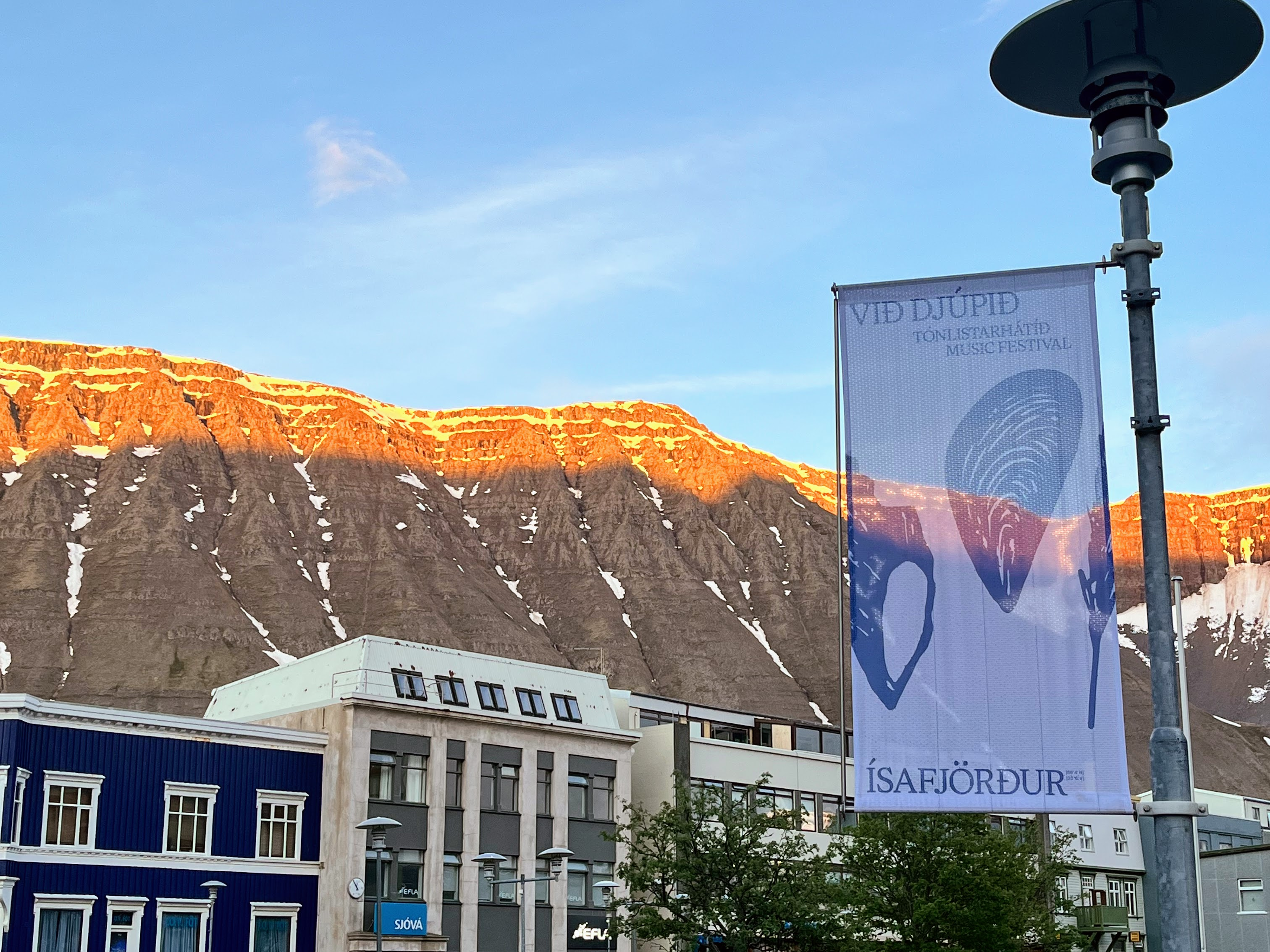
Midnight sun on the mountain tops in Ísafjörður

The Við Djúpið Music Festival (Icelandic pronunciation: [ˈvɪːð ˈtjuːpɪθ]) is an annual music event held in Ísafjörður, located in the Westfjords of Iceland. Established in 2003, the festival focuses on classical and contemporary music, providing a platform for world-renowned musicians and emerging talent to come together in a unique and inspiring setting.

== History and origin ==
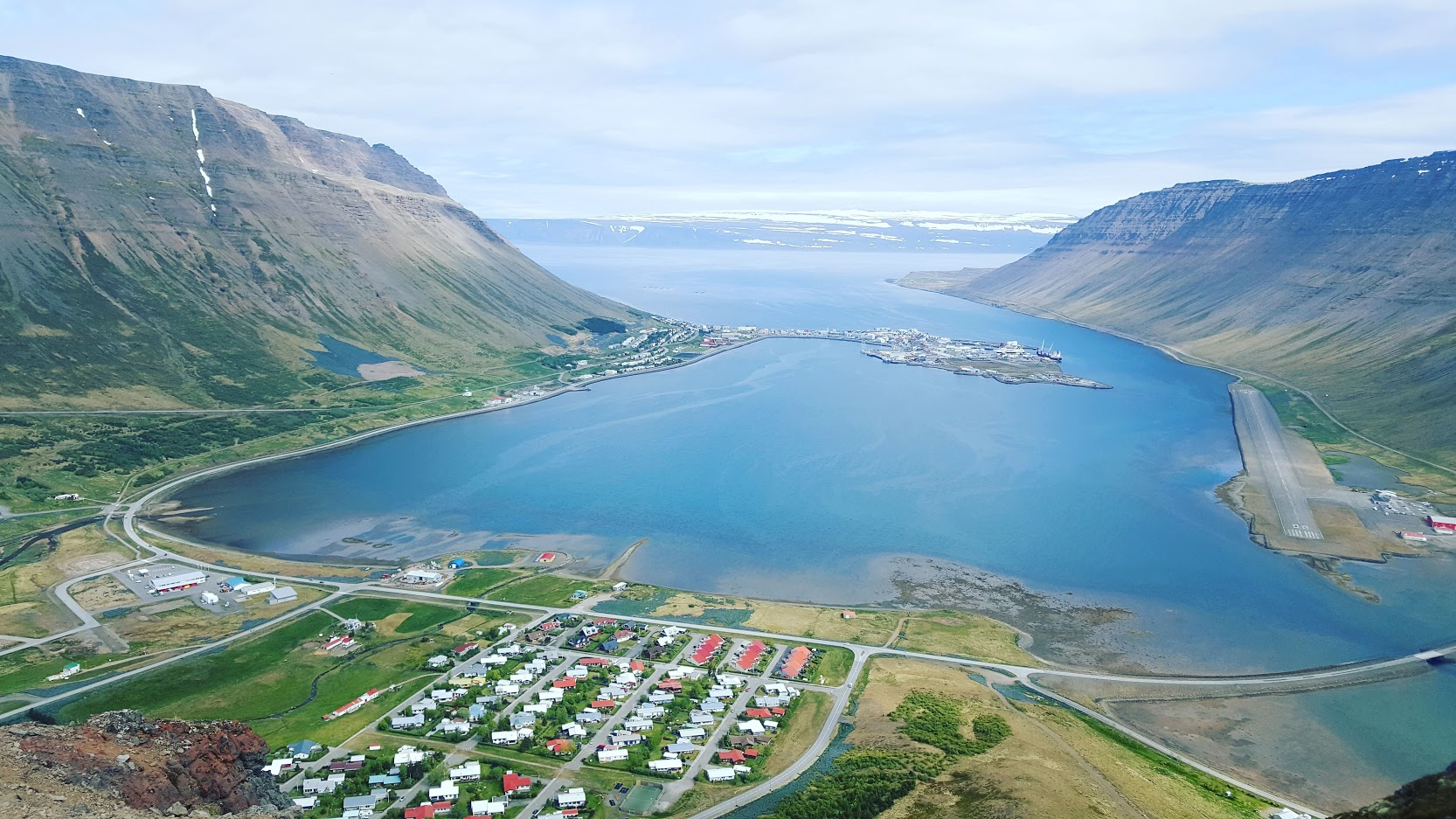
Aerial view of Ísafjörður

The Við Djúpið Music Festival was founded with the goal of creating a unique space where international artists could collaborate with Icelandic musicians and students. The festival offers master classes and performances in the stunning, remote natural setting of Ísafjörður in the Westfjords. Its name, Við Djúpið, reflects its connection to the majestic fjord Ísafjarðardjúp, emphasising the festival’s integration of music and nature, a core element of its identity.

=== Education and collaboration ===
Education has been at the heart of Við Djúpið since its inception. The festival has hosted master classes with internationally renowned musicians, offering students a rare opportunity to learn from world-class artists such as Erling Blöndal Bengtsson (cellist), Vovka Ashkenazy (pianist), and the members of the Pacifica Quartet. Further expanding its educational offerings, the festival has partnered with ensembles like Decoda, an affiliate ensemble of Carnegie Hall, and composers such as Bent Sørensen and Daniel Bjarnason. These collaborations have made Við Djúpið a hub of artistic mentorship, allowing students to engage with a diverse range of talents.

The master classes have been held in close cooperation with the Iceland Academy of the Arts and are accredited by its department of music, adding an official educational layer to the experience. The Ísafjörður Music School and the Rögnvaldur Ólafsson Art School in the Edinborg House have also served as key venues, supporting the festival’s educational and artistic missions.

=== Notable performances ===
Throughout its history, Við Djúpið has hosted an impressive roster of international and Icelandic musicians, offering a broad spectrum of classical and contemporary performances. Highlights include:

- Evan Ziporyn (clarinetist, composer, and member of Bang on a Can) who gave a master class and concert in 2007.
- In 2008, the festival featured Finnish violinist Pekka Kuusisto, pianists Simon Crawford-Phillips and Håkon Austbø, all of whom delivered captivating performances.
- Jorja Fleezanis (violinist) gave master class and performed a recital along Anna Guðný Guðmyndsdóttir (pianist) in 2012.
- The Ísafold Chamber Orchestra, an Icelandic ensemble known for its engaging interpretations of classical and modern works.
- The German avant-garde group Orchester im Treppenhaus, which added a contemporary edge to the festival’s program.

== The festivals ==
=== 2006 – June 20–25 ===
Sigrún Hjálmtýsdóttir, soprano and Anna Guðný Guðmundsdóttir pianist taught a masterclass and gave a concert. Peter Máté, pianist and Guðrún S. Birgisdóttir, flutist taught a master class. Concerts were also given by pianist Tinna Þorsteinsdóttir and the Icelandic jazz-trio Flís.

=== 2007 – June 19–24 ===
Erling Blöndal Bengtsson, cellist and Vovka Ashkenazy, pianist held master classes and concerts. A master class in Balinesian music led by Evan Ziporyn, clarinetist, composer, and member of the renowned band "Bang on a Can", and Christine Southworth, gamelan musician. The young and inventive Icelandic jazz pianist Davíð Þór Jónsson taught piano improvisation. The Icelandic experimental modern music group Aton appeared in two concerts, one of them a special Midsummernight's concert, which was broadcast nationwide by the Icelandic National Broadcasting Service (RÚV).

=== 2008 – June 17–23 ===
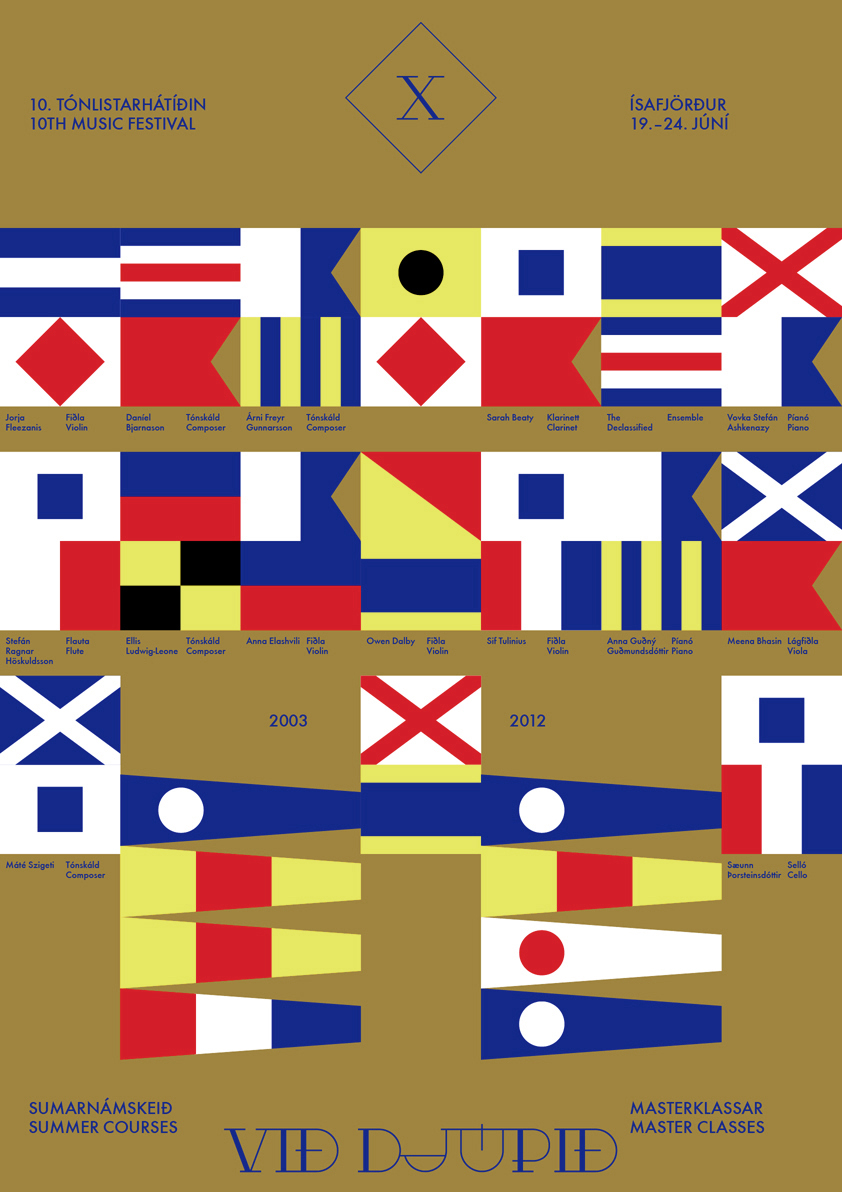
The 2012 festival poster designed by Gunnar Vilhjálmsson

In the classical department, presented artists included: Pekka Kuusisto, violinist with Simon Crawford-Phillips, pianist as well as Norwegian pianist Håkon Austbø. There was an opera workshop led by Hanna Dóra Sturludóttir, soprano and conductor/pianist Kurt Kopecky. Violinist Una Sveinbjarnardóttir taught a chamber music course and a violin course. The jazz sector featured jazz pianist Agnar Már Magnússon who led a class in piano improvisation. Other performers were Anna Guðný Guðmunsdóttir, pianist, Berglind María Tómasdóttir, flutist and Tinna Þorsteinsdóttir, pianist.

=== 2012 – June 19–24 ===
The 10th annual festival took place in 2012 marking a milestone where new elements and core aspects of the festival reached a peak. The event featured master classes, concerts, and a new late-night songwriter series, "Söngvaskáldin." Main instructors included violinist Jorja Fleezanis, flautist Stefán Ragnar Höskuldsson, and pianist Vovka Ashkenazy. Composer Daníel Bjarnason led a workshop with musicians from The Declassified (Decoda).

=== New Era ===
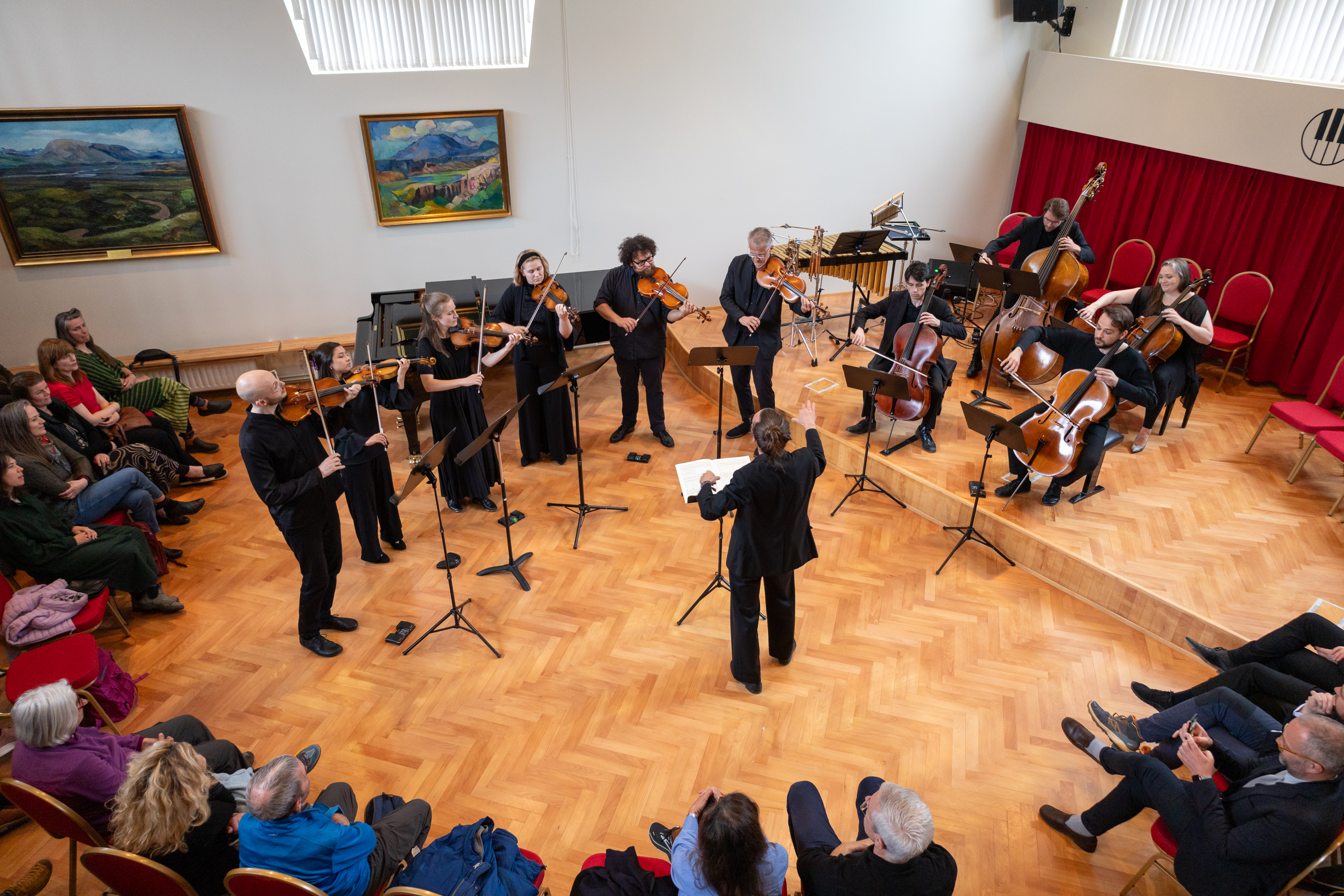
From the festival's final concert on June 22, 2024

==== 2024 – June 17–22 ====
The festival featured a diverse lineup, including the German chamber group Orchester im Treppenhaus and composer Ellis Ludwig-Leone, American Antigone Piano Trio blending American and German influences. Icelandic soprano Herdís Anna Jónsdóttir performed Schubert’s Winterreise with the orchestra, while cellist Sæunn Þorsteinsdóttir premiered the piece Eilífur snjór. The festival emphasized international collaboration and local participation, offering master classes and concerts.

== Artists ==
- Anna Guðný Guðmundsdóttir Iceland 2006, 2008, 2010, 2012.
- Andrew Quartermain United Kingdom
- Árni Heimir Ingólfsson Iceland 2010.
- Bent Sørensen Denmark 2009.
- Berglind María Tómasdótir Iceland 2008.
- Catherine Gregory United States Australia 2023.
- Christine Southworth United States 2007.
- Daníel Bjarnason Iceland 2009–2013.
- David Kaplan United States 2023.
- Ellis Ludwig-Leone United States 2023, 2024.
- Eliza Bagg United States 2024.
- Elizabeth Roe United States 2013.
- Erna Vala Arnardóttir Iceland 2022.
- Erling Blöndal Bengtsson Iceland Denmark 2007
- Evan Ziporyn United States 2007.
- Goran Stevanovich Bosnia and Herzegovina 2024.
- Guðrún Sigríður Birgisdóttir Iceland 2003–2006.
- Halldór Haraldsson Iceland
- Halldór Smárason Iceland 2023, 2024.
- Hanna Dóra Sturludóttir Iceland 2008.
- Håkon Austbø Norway 2008.
- Herdís Anna Jónasdóttir Iceland 2024.
- James Laing United Kingdom 2022.
- James McVinnie United Kingdom 2012, 2013.
- Jorja Fleezanis United States 2010.
- Jónas Ingimundarson Iceland
- Kurt Kopecky Austria 2005.
- Kurt Nikkanen Finland
- Meena Bhasin United States 2011–2013.
- Owen Dalby United States 2011–2013.
- Ólafur Kjartan Sigurðsson Iceland 2003.
- Pekka Kuusisto Finland 2008.
- Pétur Jónasson Iceland 2003–5, 2009.
- Sif Tulinius Iceland 2010.
- Simon Crawford Philips United Kingdom 2008.
- Stefán Ragnar Höskuldsson Iceland 2010.
- Sæunn Þorsteinsdóttir Iceland United States 2009, 2011–2013, 2022, 2023, 2024.
- Tinna Þorsteinsdóttir Iceland 2006–2008.
- Una Sveinbjarnardóttir Iceland 2008, 2009.
- Vovka Stefán Ashkenazy Iceland 2007, 2010.

=== Ensembles ===
- Pasifica-kvartettinn United States 2005.
- Flís trir Iceland 2006.
- ATON Iceland 2007.
- Ísafold Chamber Orchestra Iceland 2009.
- Nordic Chamber Soloists Iceland Norway Sweden Germany 2010.
- Ensemble Connect (ACJW) United States 2011.
- Dúó Harpverk Iceland 2011.
- Decoda United States 2012, 2013, 2023.
- Asteío-trio Canada 2023.
- Orchester im Treppenhaus Germany 2024.
- Antigone Music Collective United States 2024.

== Management ==
Based on the Icelandic Wikipedia entry for Við Djúpið, the festival was founded in 2003 by Guðrún Birgisdóttir (flutist) and Pétur Jónasson (guitarist). Over the years, key figures like Greipur Gíslason, Tinna Þorsteinsdóttir, and Dagný Arnalds have taken on significant roles in organizing and leading the festival. Since 2023, Bjarney Ingibjörg Gunnlaugsdóttir has joined Greipur in leading the event. The festival is known for its educational focus and collaboration with local institutions like the Ísafjörður Music School.
