= Westfjords Heritage Museum =

Museum in Ísafjörður, Iceland

Coordinates: 66°4′08″N 23°7′6″W

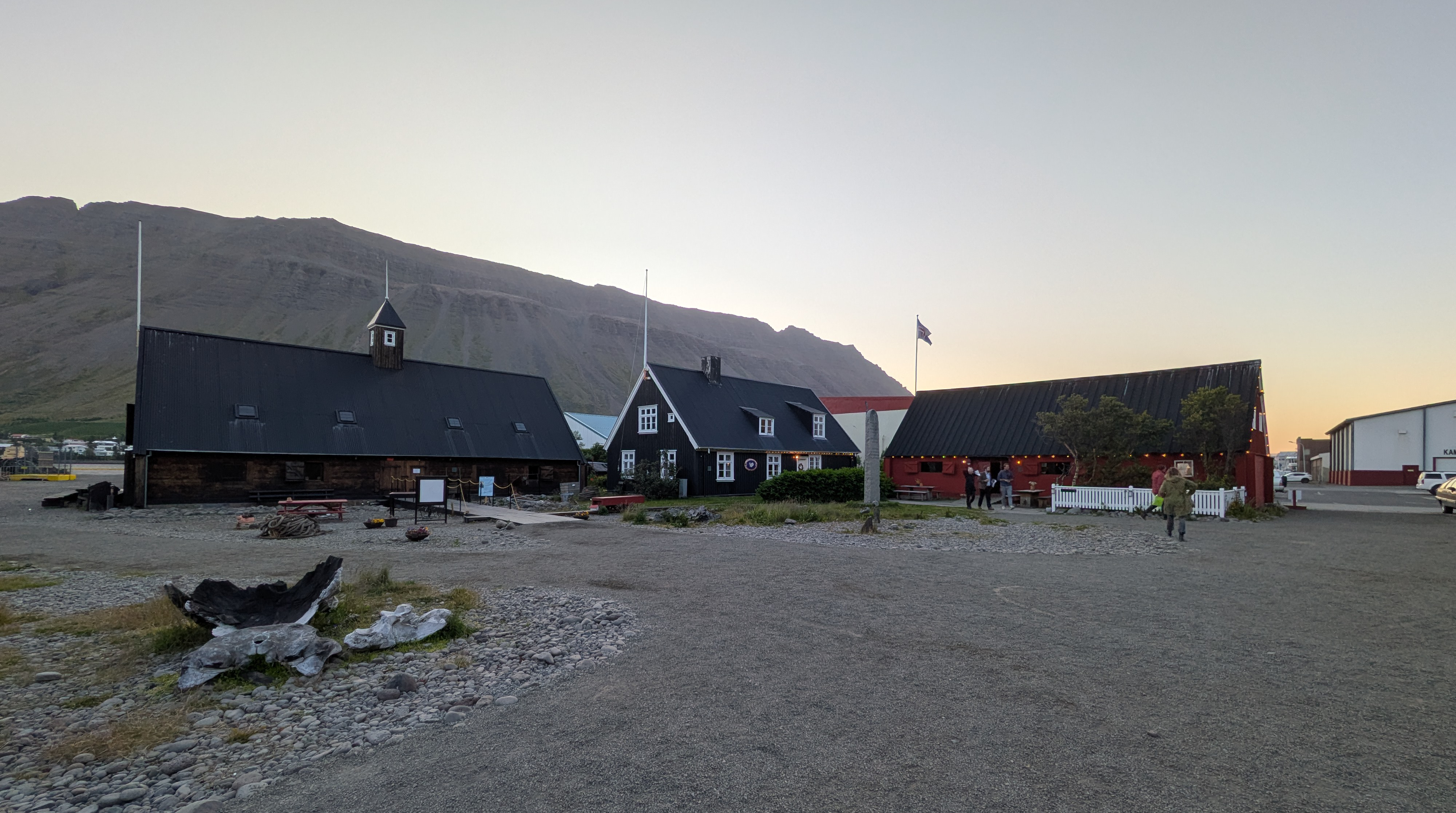
Westfjords Heritage Museum.

The Westfjords Heritage Museum (Icelandic: Byggðasafn Vestfjarða [ˈpɪɣðaˌsapn ˈvɛstˌfjarða]) is a museum in Ísafjörður in the Westfjords of Iceland.

The museum is based on maritime heritage and gives an insight into the local Westfjords fisheries and fishing industry as well the life of the fishermen, their families and the coastal culture through the centuries.

The museum has made a policy concerning preservation of boats to restore them to their previous condition and to keep them seaworthy. The main focus is also to maintain knowledge and skills concerning their repair and maintenance and make sure that the knowledge is being passed between generations. The museum was opened in Turnhúsið on Fisherman's Day in 1988.

Most of the museum collection consists of various historical things regarding the fisheries and the fishing industry around the Westfjords. Among interesting things is a collection of 190 accordions, a collection of valuable old boats and different things found by divers in the seas around the fjords. The museum is a popular point of interest. Visitors from cruise ships that come to Ísafjörður are frequent guests. A local theatre group dressed in Icelandic national costumes makes a play of the daily life of the beginning 19th century, where they sing and dance to a music and put the fish bacalao out in the sun to dry. In 2013 during the summer opening time, 12,000 visitors came to visit the museum. The Museum is managed by Ísafjarðarbær, Súðavíkurhreppur and Bolungarvíkurkaupstaður.

The museum is open during the summertime.

== Museum history ==
The first ideas about establishing heritage and maritime museum came from a man named Bárður G. Tómasson. In 1939, he wrote a newspaper article suggesting that people should unite in a project that involved a restoration of an old boat model called sexæringur. The boat should be an indicator of a regional heritage and maritime museum. The idea was successful. Few years later, in July 1941, the Ísafjörður heritage and maritime museum was established and Bárður was elected the first chairman. In the early decades little changed concerning the museum and its activities although in the year 1947 the museum came under control of the town council of Ísafjörður and the county committees. It was not until in the beginning of the 1970s with the restoration of Neðstikaupstaður that the museum found its future home in Turnhúsið which opened on Sjómannadagurinn the year 1988.

=== Neðstikaupstaður ===
Neðstikaupstaður is an old historical site from the time Ísafjörður was called Skutulsfjarðaeyri. It has a long history of being a trading point with fish and other goods. It had couple of houses but the area consists now of four old houses that were built by Danish traders during the time that Iceland was under the Danish crown. The oldest house is Krambúðin built 1757 as a storage house and a trading store. Now it is the residence of the museum curator and his family. Faktorshúsið was built 1765 as a home for the "faktor" the store manager. Now the director of Ísafjörður Safnahús "The Museum house" (photo and art museum) lives there. Tjöruhúsið was built in 1781 as a storage house and is now a seafood restaurant by the same name.

Turnhúsið was built 1784 as storage house now the home of Westfjords heritage museum. Neðstikaupstaður is the oldest "village" in Iceland where houses are grouped together from historical time. In 1975 that the houses were put on a preservation list and a major restoration started in 1977. The trading history came to an end in 1926, and since then the houses had lacked maintenance, were used as storage rooms and were in a really bad condition. This monumental site is now a pride for the town and its people, it keeps the history alive in an authentic atmosphere of the 18th century.

=== Turnhúsið ===
Turnhúsið, or the Tower House, is the newest building in Neðstikaupstaður. The three-storey building includes a tower with an observation opening from which the manager could monitor ships and workers. Its architectural style, known as sparra stova, resembles that of German and other European buildings from the same period. The house was restored with that idea it would be a place for the heritage museum that was opened the year 1988.

== The collection ==
The museum's collection consists mainly of items related to local towns around the Westfjords. The museum houses a boat collection, 190 accordions, boat engines, boat models, an old diving suit, old fishing gear, and a variety of technical equipment. The collection also includes a collection of valuables that divers have found around old shipwrecks in the region. Expeditions have been made in the interest of locating shipwrecks and finding artifacts.

=== Boats ===
As the museum policy says they focus on maintaining knowledge concerning restoring old boats. On the museum homepage there is a list over 15 boats and their story.

=== Accordions ===
In 2008, the couple Ásgeir S. Sigurðsson and Messíana Marsellíusdóttir gave the museum Ásgeirs accordion collection. The collection had 140 accordion of various sizes and from various periods in the development history of the accordion. The oldest accordion is since 1830 and is in very good condition and in the original packaging. The museum has many artifacts, and many accordions were owned by famous Icelandic accordion musicians. The collection continues to grow and now considers over 190 accordions. On the museum homepage each accordion has its own history and a picture.

== Exhibitions ==
The Westfjords heritage museum displays various exhibitions each year. The museum has over the years been cooperating with various parties, individuals, organizations and businesses with installation and consulting. Annually there are also solid performances such as Christmas exhibition in collaboration with Ísafjörður Safnahús and a ski exhibition which is installed on Skíðavika (Ski week) a festival that takes place around Easter every year. Since 2002 the museum has been having an annual bacalao(saltfish) fest were the material has been sun dried cod that has been spread out and let to dry

== Published materials ==
The museum has published a recipe book Veislurnar í Neðsta with saltfish recipes from the local homes. There is also a variety of interesting facts and various aspects of the history of the bacalao (salt fish).
