= Maus (band) =

Icelandic rock band

- Origin: Reykjavík, Iceland
- Genres: Rock/Pop, Alternative rock, Punk rock
- Years active: 1993–2015
- Label: Bad Taste
- Members: Birgir Örn "Biggi" Steinarsson (Vocals/Guitar); Daníel "Danni" Þorsteinsson (Drums); Eggert Gíslason (Bass); Páll Ragnar "Palli" Pálsson (Guitar)

Maus is a rock band from Iceland, formed in 1993. The band consists of Birgir Örn "Biggi" Steinarsson on vocals and guitar, Daníel "Danni" Þorsteinsson on drums, Eggert Gíslason on bass, and Páll Ragnar "Palli" Pálsson on guitar. Most of their songs are sung in Icelandic, though English versions of some songs have been released, as well as some original songs in English.

The band was active release-wise from 1994 to 2004 but still continue to play live. They released five studio albums, a number of singles and a compilation that also featured one new song and a bonus CD with unreleased demo's and remixes.

== History ==
The band was very active with live performances in and outside their native country. Abroad their most noticeable gigs where at the CMJ, Summerstage and touring Denmark. While active the band appeared at every Iceland Airwaves music festival including the first one. They were a popular supporting band for foreign bands who would visit Iceland. Those included bands/artists as Coldplay, Blonde Redhead, Ash, Ian Brown, Keane, Modest Mouse, and Placebo. Furthermore, Roger O'Donnell from The Cure has appeared as a guest keyboardist on their album Lof mér að falla að þínu eyra.

In December 2004 Maus went on a hiatus. Band members decided to pursue other interests, academic and otherwise, outside of Iceland. Meanwhile, members were working on several music projects including Fræ (Palli's band), Sometime (Danni's band) and Biggi's solo project. Palli (as Páll Ragnar Pálsson) has become a respected classical composer after receiving his PhD in music from the Estonian Academy of Music and Theatre in Tallinn. Birgir became a screenwriter and won the Icelandic film awards Edda with co-writer and director Baldvin Z for the film Life in a Fishbowl (or Vonarstræti), named after a popular track from Maus's fifth studio album, Musick.

In August 2013 all four members of Maus found themselves living in Reykjavík simultaneously, for the first time since the split. In November the same year they came together to play at a concert celebrating the 20 year birthday of local alternative and rock radio station X977 for a full house at Listasafn Reykjavíkur. The following spring they played at the Aldrei fór ég suður music festival in Ísafjörður. Two festival gigs followed that summer, at the first Secret Solstice festival and at metal festival Eistnaflug.

Early in 2015 the band announced that Maus would be playing gigs that year, including that years "Þjóðhátíð", the decades-old bank-holiday festival in Vestmannaeyjar. The band continues to reform sporadically, after three years of intermission they came together again to play a series of concerts, including the Iceland Airwaves festival, to celebrate the 20 year anniversary of "Lof mér að falla að þínu eyra"

== Discography ==
- Allar kenningar heimsins… …og ögn meira (Smekkleysa, 1994)
- Ghostsongs (163952) (Sproti, 1995)
- Lof Mér Að Falla Að Þínu Eyra (Sproti, 1997)
- Í þessi sekúndubrot sem ég flýt (Sproti, 1999)
- How Far Is Too Far? (self-released, 2000) – a promotional EP featuring English-language versions of "Kerfisbundin þrá" ("How Far Is Too Far?"), "Strengir" ("Strings"), and "Dramafíkill" ("Dramajunkie"). there is also an Enhanced CD portion on the disc featuring the "How Far Is Too Far?" video, and MP3s of three more translated songs: "Ungfrú Orðadrepir" ("Miss Moodbreaker"), "Égímeilaðig" ("Revenge Of The Nerd"), and "Allt sem þú lest er lygi" ("Every Written Word Is A Lie").
- Nánast ólöglegt (Tónlyst, 2002) – single, limited to 200 copies. The cover-sleeve was handmade by the band and released in four different color-versions.
- Musick (Smekkleysa, 2003) – Maus' first English language album. "How Far Is Too Far?" is a different version than the one released on the How Far Is Too Far? promotional EP.
- Tónlyst 1994 - 2004 / Lystaukar 1993 - 2004 (2004)

== Videography ==
- "Skjár" (1994) – directed by Árni Þór Jónsson and Árni Sveinsson
- "Síðasta ástin fyrir pólskiptin" (1997) – directed by Árni Sveinsson
- "Allt sem þú lest er lygi" (1999) – directed by Freyr Einarsson
- "How Far Is Too Far?" (1999) – directed by Reynir Lyngdal
- "Life In A Fishbowl" (2003) – directed by Börkur Sigþórsson og Björn Thors
- "My Favourite Excuse" (2003) – directed by Ragnar Hansson
- "Liquid Substance" (2004) – directed by Hlynur Magnússon
- "Over Me, Under Me" (2004) – directed by Elvar Gunnarsson
