= Gugusar =

Icelandic singer (born 2004)

- Born: Guðlaug Sóley Höskuldsdóttir; 29 January 2004 (age 22); Reykjavík, Iceland
- Genres: Indie pop; electronic
- Occupation: Singer
- Instrument: Vocals
- Years active: 2018–present
- Label: Sony Music Iceland

Guðlaug Sóley Höskuldsdóttir (born 29 January 2004), known professionally as Gugusar, is an Icelandic singer. She has released three studio albums.

== Biography ==
Born and raised in the Grafarvogur district of the Icelandic capital Reykjavík, Gugusar performed live for the first time under her stage name in 2019 at the music competition Músiktilraunir, where she won first prize in the electronic music category with the song "Marthröð".

After signing with Sony Music Iceland, she released her debut studio album, Listen to This Twice, in February 2020, which is primarily sung in English.

Gugusar's second studio album, 12:48, was released in November 2022 and peaked at number 18 on the Icelandic Album Chart, giving her her first national chart spot. Recorded mostly in Icelandic, the album was promoted at the Iceland Airwaves festival, where she performed as a headliner.

In June 2025, Gugusar released her third studio album entitled Quack (stylized in all caps), which features nine tracks, including the lead single "Reykjavíkurkvöld".

== Discography ==
=== Studio albums ===
List of studio albums, with selected details
Title	Details	Peak chart positions
Title	Details	ICE
Listen to This Twice	Released: 29 February 2020; Label: Sony Music Iceland; Formats: Digital download, streaming	—
12:48	Released: 11 November 2022; Label: Sony Music Iceland; Formats: Digital download, streaming	18
Quack	Released: 27 June 2025; Label: ISR; Formats: Digital download, streaming	—

=== Singles ===
- 2019 – I'm Not Supposed to Say This
- 2019 – If U Wanna Go
- 2019 – Marthröð
- 2020 – Frosið sólarlag (featuring Auður)
- 2021 – Röddin í Klettunum
- 2021 – Glerdúkkan
- 2022 – Annar séns
- 2023 – Vonin
- 2024 – Ekkert gerðist
- 2024 – Merki
- 2025 – Reykjavíkurkvöld
- 2025 – Sálfræði
- 2025 – Aldrei til (featuring HubbaBubba & Hiilmar)
