= Bolungarvíkurgöng =

Tunnel in northwestern Iceland

Coordinates: 66°07′50″N 23°10′02″W

Bolungarvík Tunnel
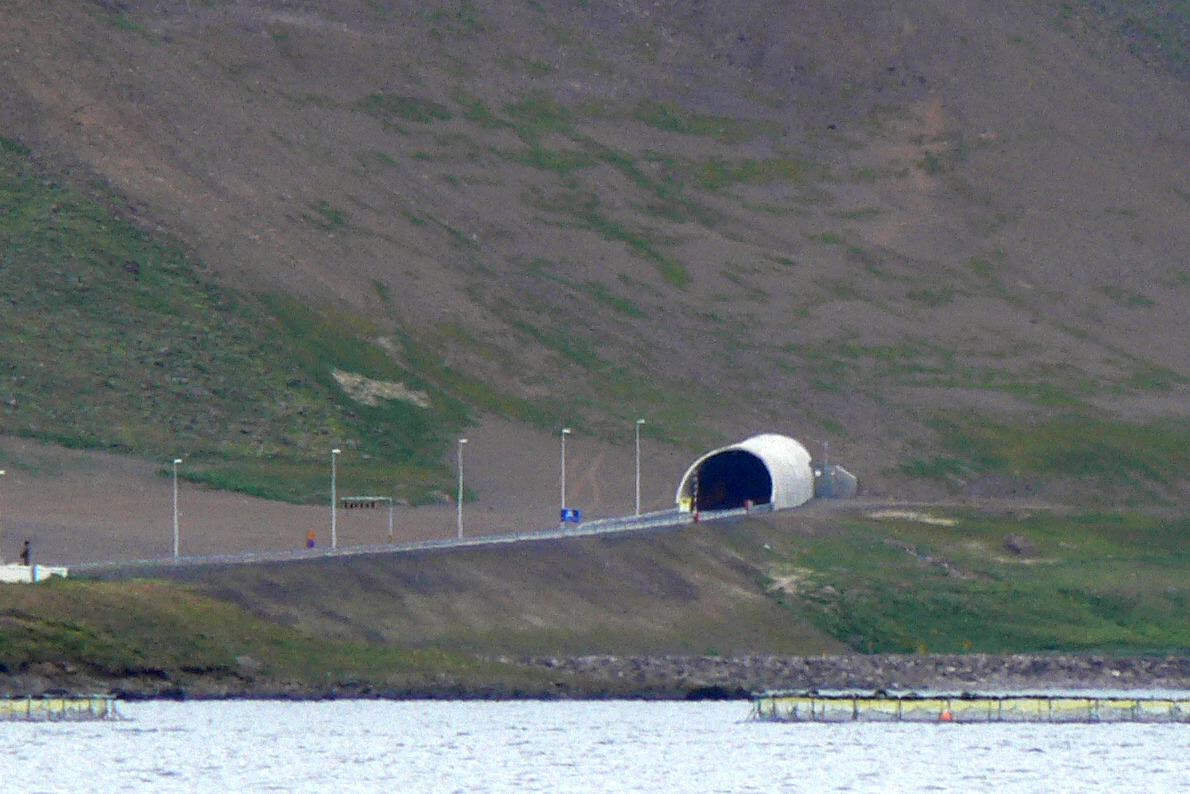
- Southeast entrance
- Interactive map of Bolungarvík Tunnel

Overview
- Location: Westfjords, Iceland
- Route: 61

Operation
- Work began: 2008
- Opened: 2010
- Operator: Vegagerðin
- Traffic: Automotive
- Vehicles per day: 800

Technical
- Length: 5.426 km (3.372 mi)
- No. of lanes: 2
- Grade: 2%

Bolungarvíkurgöng (Icelandic pronunciation: [ˈpɔːluŋkarˌviːkʏrˌkœyŋk], regionally also [ˈpɔːlʏŋkarˌviːkʏrˌkœŋk]) is a tunnel in northwestern Iceland, located in Westfjords along Route 61. It has a length of 5,426 m (17,802 ft) and opened on 25 September 2010.

One of the main objectives of building the tunnel was to replace one of Iceland's most dangerous roads, which connected two of the largest towns in the area, Ísafjörður and Bolungarvík, and thereby improve road safety. The old road lies along the seashore under the steep and unstable mountain hills of Óshlíð, and was subject to frequent avalanches and rockfalls. Other objectives include improved road connections and reduced travel times, such that the distance between Ísafjordur and Bolungarvík would be similar to that between districts in a city.

Bolungarvik Tunnel details:

- Tunnel length: 5.426 km
- Cross section of the tunnel: 54 m²
- Maximum width of the tunnel: 8.7 m
- Two-lane highway
- Number of emergency lay-bys: 10

As part of the construction project, an additional 3.7 kilometres (2.3 mi) of road was built, including a pair of bridges crossing the Ósá and Langá rivers.

The tunnel featured in the 2026 TV series Hildur as the location where two young girls vanished many years before.
