= Ísafjörður =

- Town
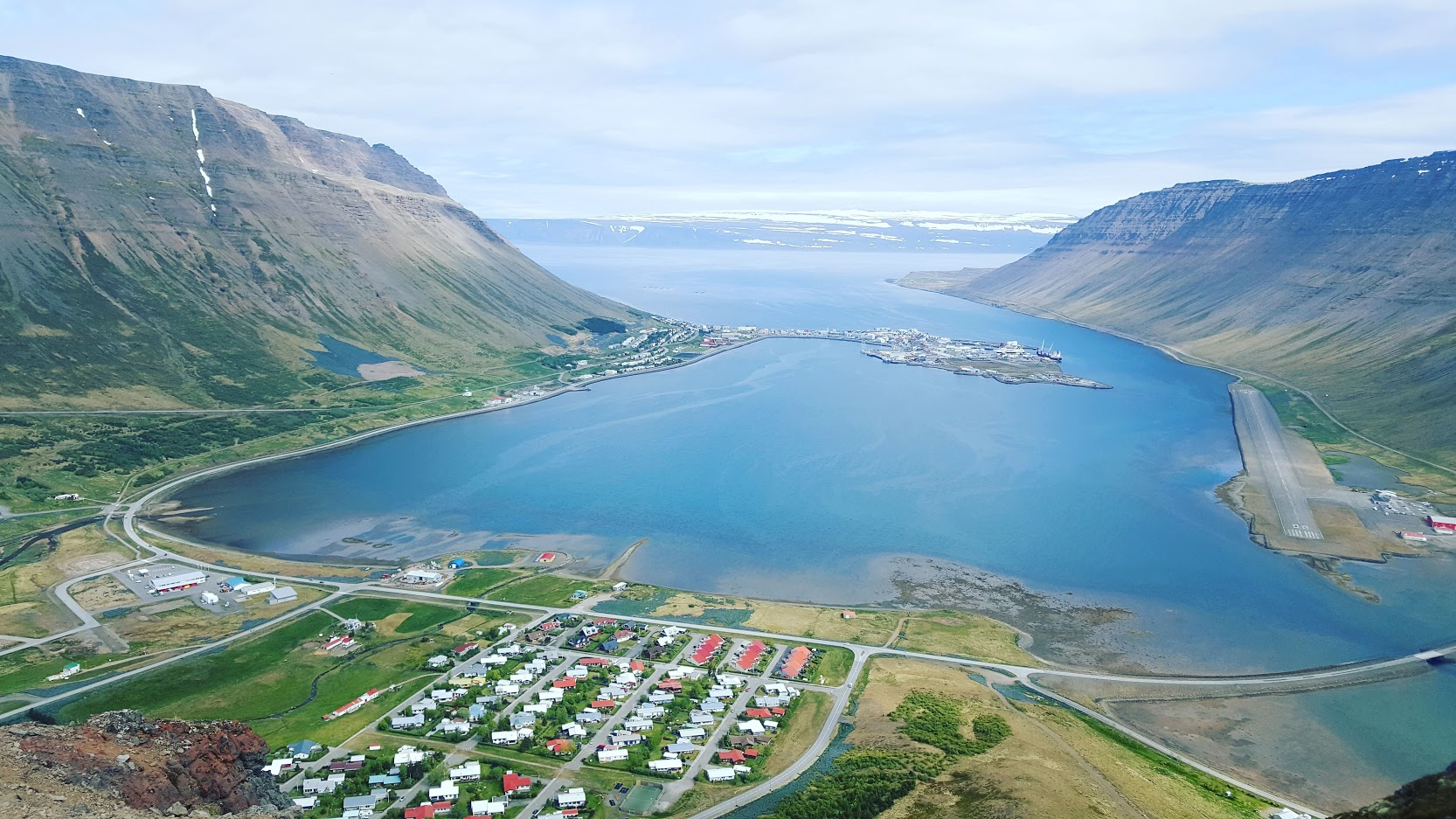
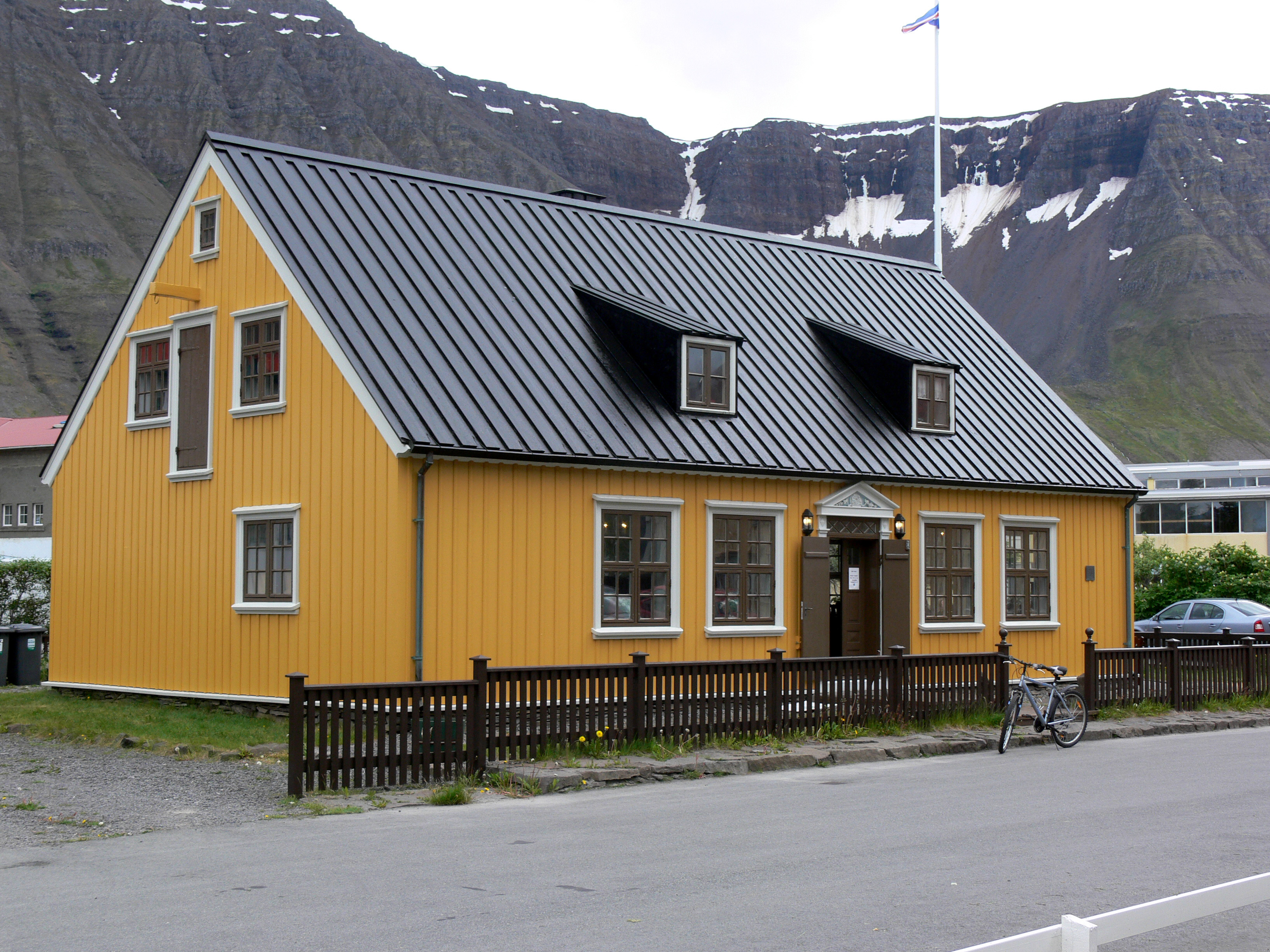
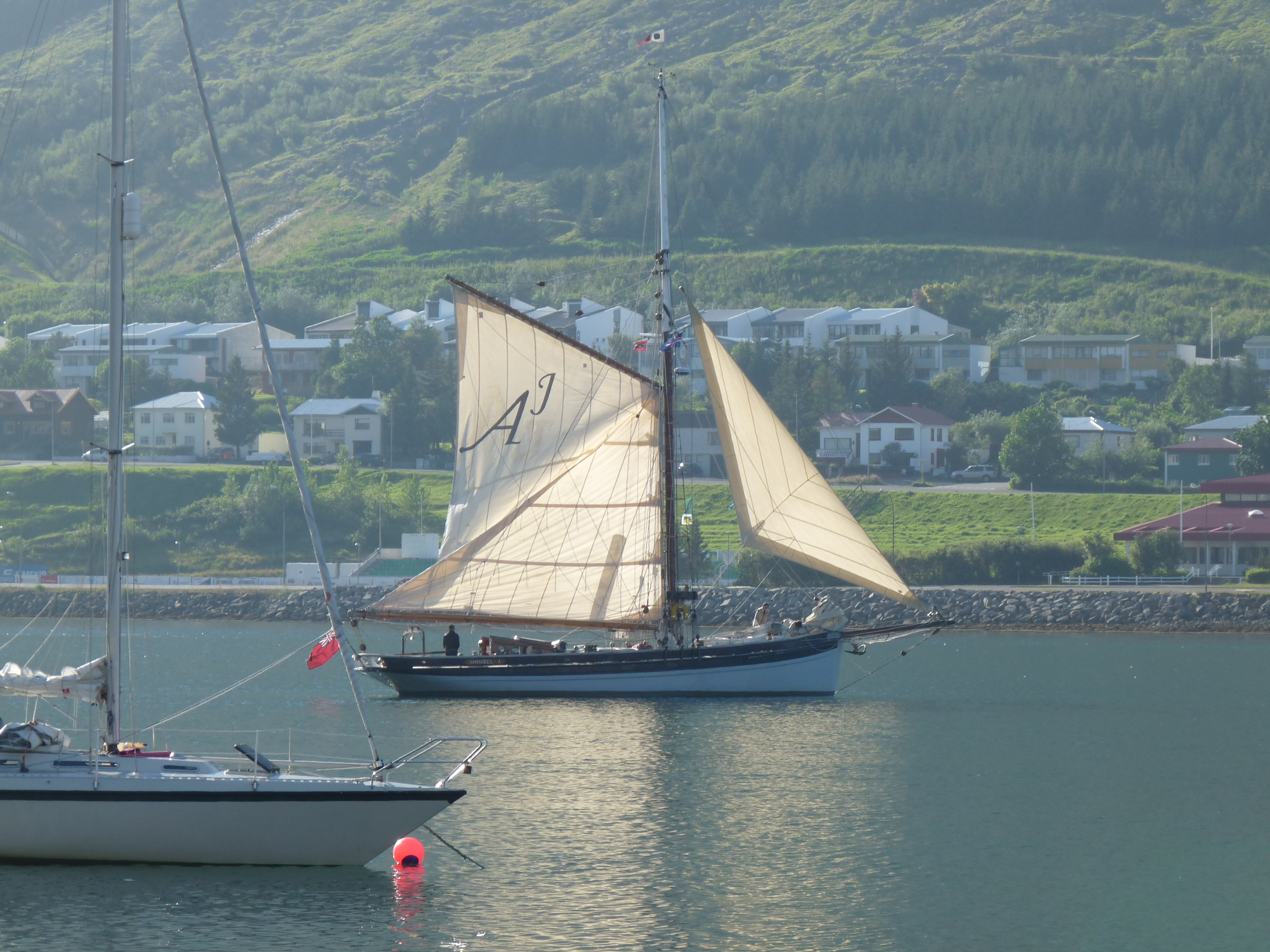
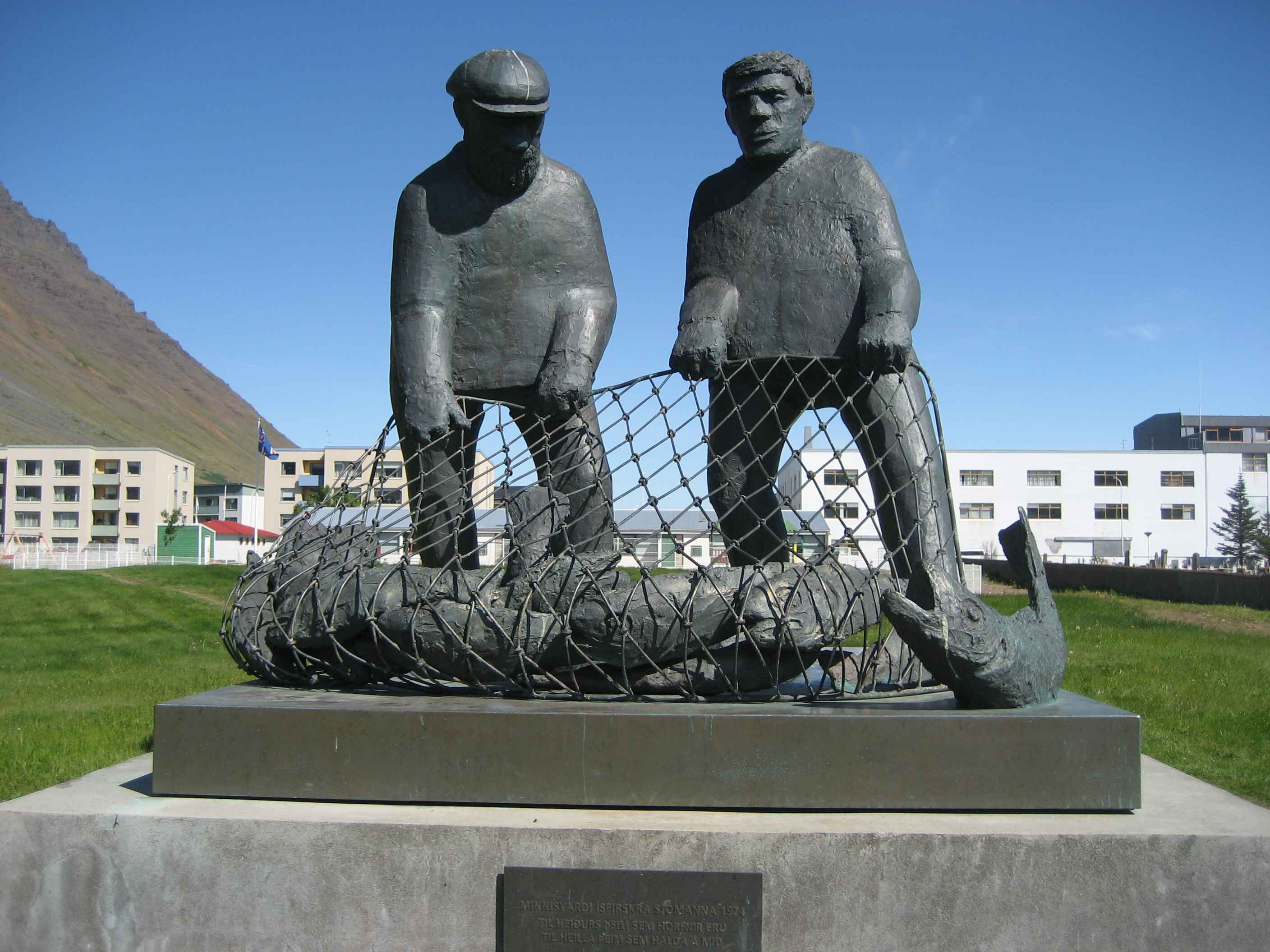
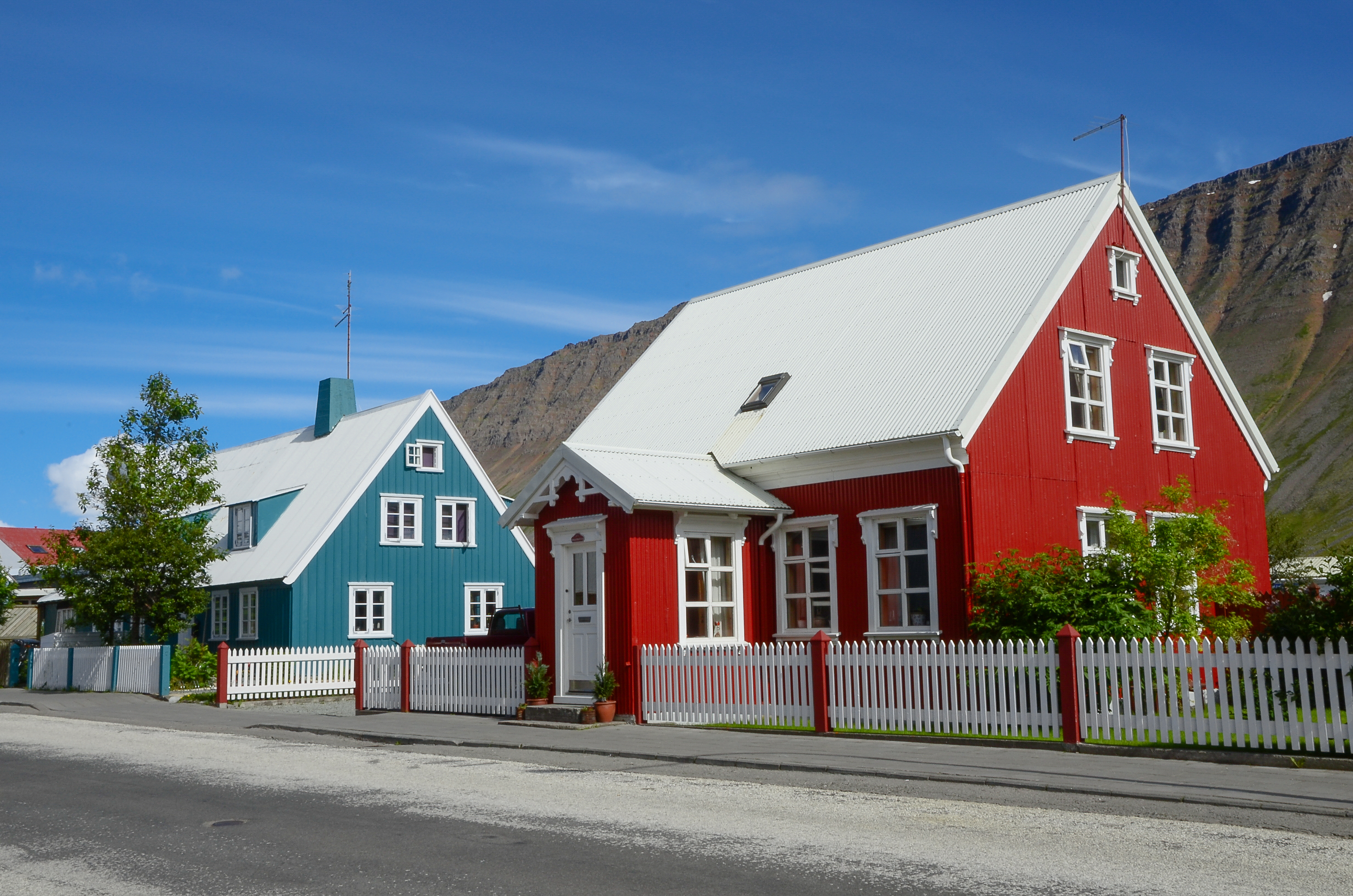
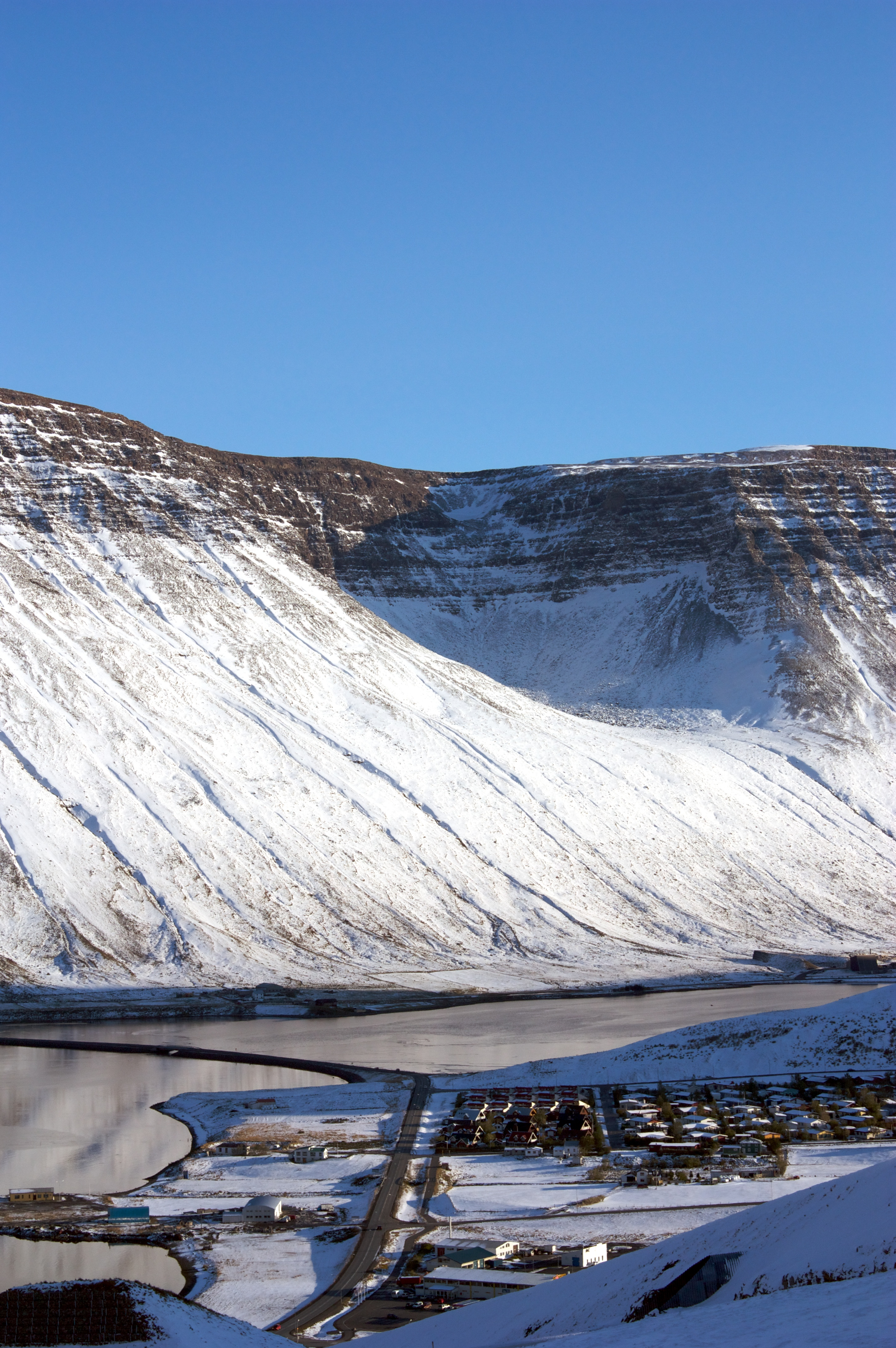
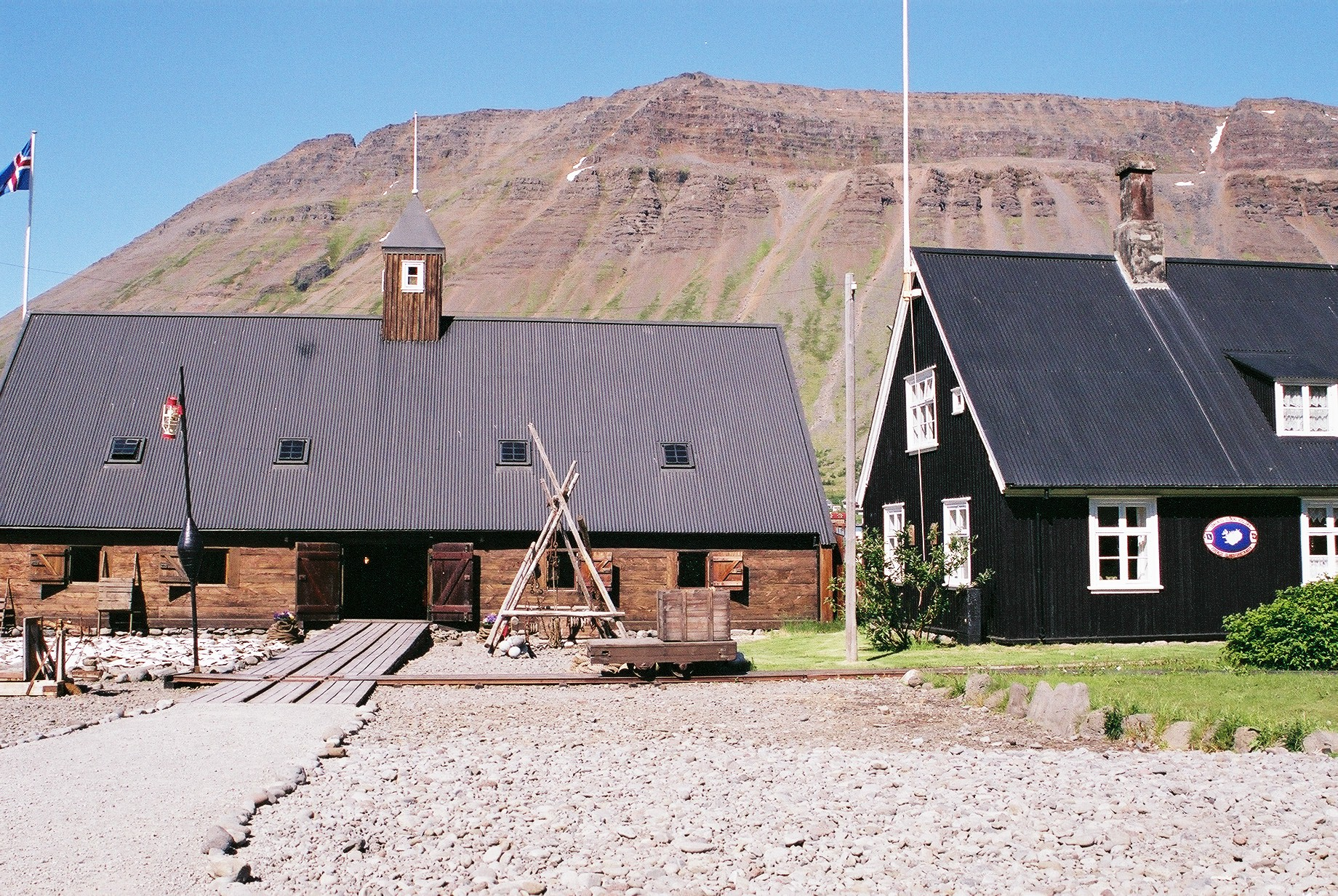
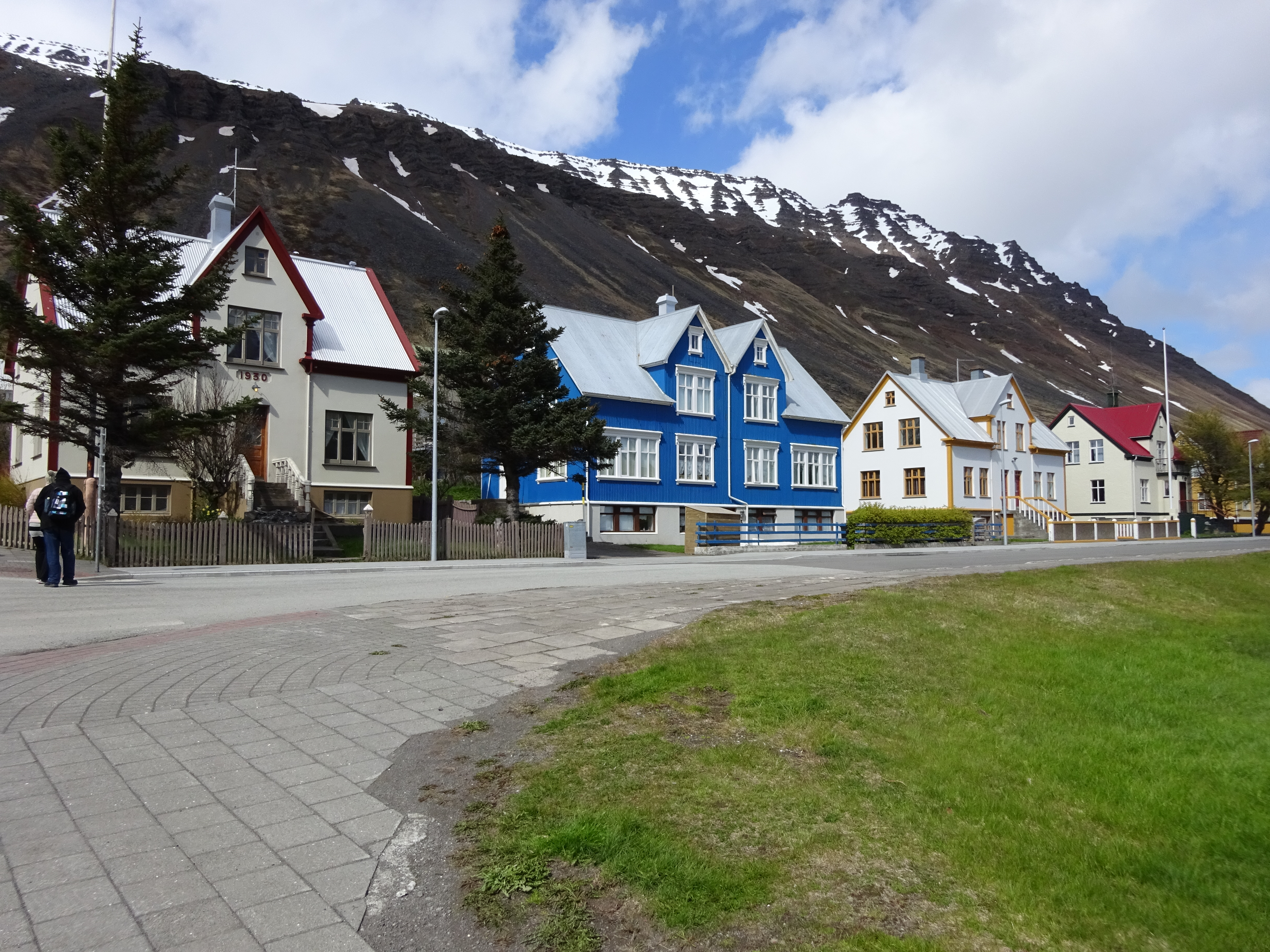
- Ísafjörður

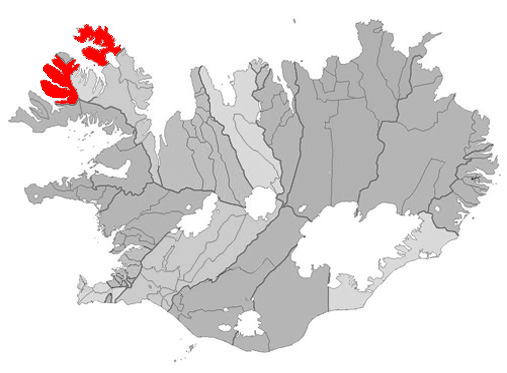
- Location of the Municipality of Ísafjarðarbær

- Location in Iceland
- Coordinates: 66°04′N 23°07′W
- Country: Iceland
- Constituency: Northwest Constituency
- Region: Westfjords
- Municipality: Ísafjarðarbær

Population (1 January 2026)
  - Total: 2,807
- Time zone: UTC+0 (GMT)
- Postal code: 400, 401
- Website: Official website

Turnhúsið (built 1784), Krambúð (built 1757) and Tjöruhúsið (built 1781) in Neðstikaupstaður in Ísafjörður

Ísafjörður (pronounced [ˈiːsaˌfjœrðʏr̥], meaning ice fjord, literally fjord of ices) is a town in the northwest of Iceland.

The oldest part of Ísafjörður with the town centre is located on a spit of sand, or eyri, in Skutulsfjörður, a fjord which meets the waters of the larger fjord Ísafjarðardjúp. With a population of about 2,600, Ísafjörður is the largest settlement in the peninsula of Vestfirðir (Westfjords) and the administration centre of the Ísafjarðarbær municipality, which includes—besides Ísafjörður—the nearby villages of Hnífsdalur, Flateyri, Suðureyri, and Þingeyri.

== History ==
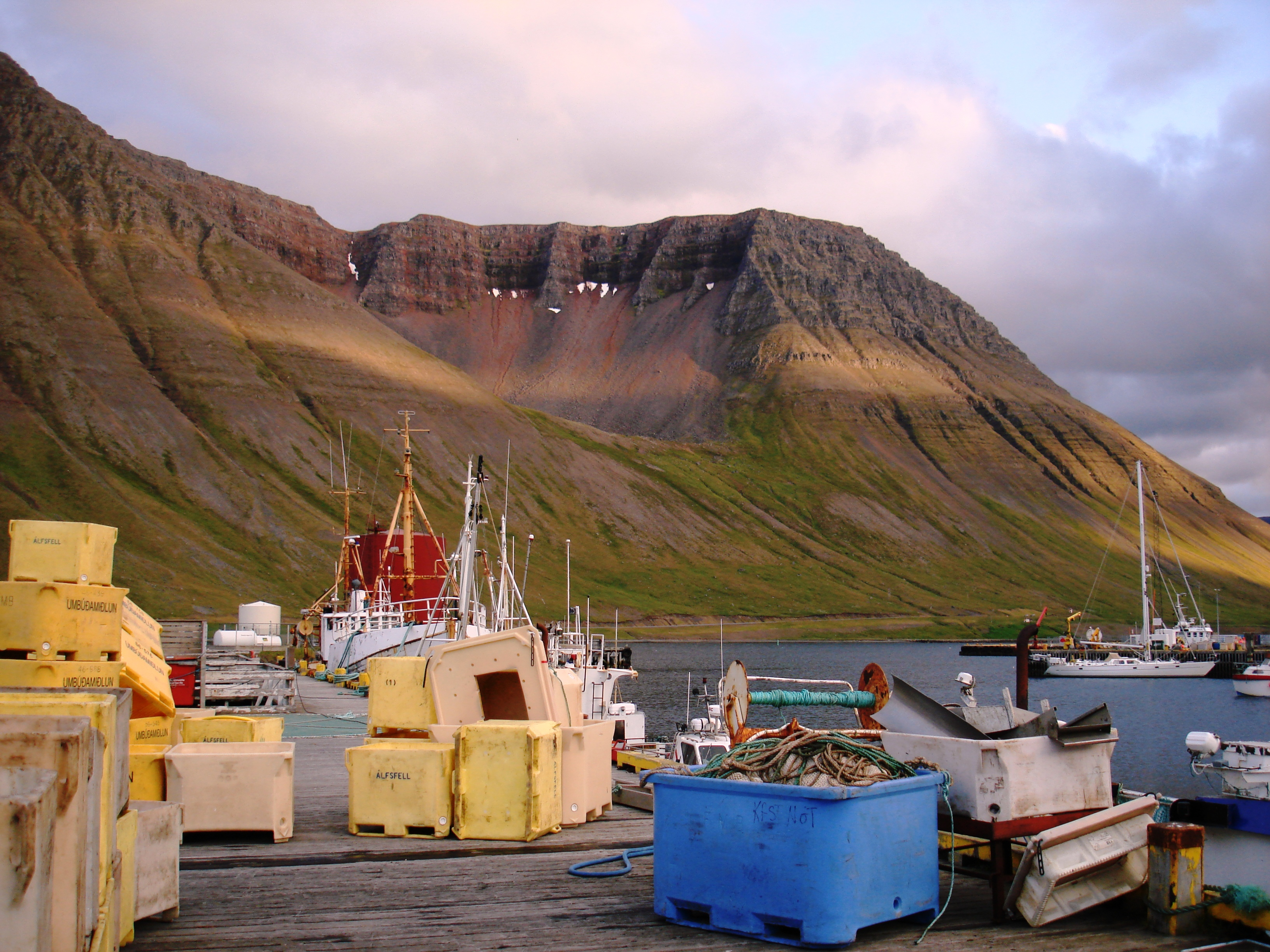
Ísafjörður harbour

According to the Landnámabók (the book of settlement), Skutulsfjörður was first settled by Helgi Magri Hrólfsson in the 9th century. In the 16th century, the town grew as it became a trading post for foreign merchants. Witch trials were common around the same time throughout the Westfjords, and many people were banished to the nearby peninsula of Hornstrandir, now a national nature reserve. The town of Ísafjörður was granted municipal status in 1786.

The former Danish trading post Neðstikaupstaður, established in the 18th century, contains the oldest collection of timber frame houses in Iceland. These include Krambúð (1757), Faktorshús (1765), now the Danish consulate, Tjöruhúsið (1781), now a restaurant, and the site of the Westfjords Heritage Museum Turnhúsið (1784).

== Geography and climate ==
The Westfjords are known to be the coolest area in Iceland at sea level. Ísafjörður has a tundra climate (Köppen climate classification: ET), closely bordering on either a dry-summer subarctic climate (Köppen climate classification: Dsc) or a cold-summer mediterranean climate (Köppen climate classification: Csc), depending on using the 0 °C (32.0 °F) or the −3 °C (26.6 °F) isotherm. The climate is characterised by cold winters and cool summers. The warmest month is July with the mean temperature of 9.9 °C (49.8 °F); the wettest is November with 120 mm (4.7 in) of precipitation. The climate has significantly warmed in recent years due to climate change. Ísafjörður experiences high winds and very few clear days throughout the year.

Climate data for Þórustaðir, 16.5 km (10.3 mi) from Ísafjörður (1961–1990)
Month	Jan	Feb	Mar	Apr	May	Jun	Jul	Aug	Sep	Oct	Nov	Dec	Year
Record high °C (°F)	11.5 (52.7)	11.5 (52.7)	10.7 (51.3)	14.2 (57.6)	22.6 (72.7)	19.3 (66.7)	24.8 (76.6)	21.8 (71.2)	17.7 (63.9)	15.9 (60.6)	12.8 (55.0)	11.9 (53.4)	24.8 (76.6)
Mean daily maximum °C (°F)	1.2 (34.2)	1.8 (35.2)	1.1 (34.0)	3.8 (38.8)	7.5 (45.5)	10.7 (51.3)	12.5 (54.5)	12.0 (53.6)	8.6 (47.5)	5.4 (41.7)	2.9 (37.2)	1.5 (34.7)	5.8 (42.4)
Daily mean °C (°F)	−1.5 (29.3)	−1.0 (30.2)	−1.6 (29.1)	1.1 (34.0)	4.8 (40.6)	8.1 (46.6)	9.9 (49.8)	9.2 (48.6)	5.9 (42.6)	3.1 (37.6)	0.3 (32.5)	−1.2 (29.8)	3.1 (37.6)
Mean daily minimum °C (°F)	−5.0 (23.0)	−4.4 (24.1)	−5.0 (23.0)	−2.1 (28.2)	1.7 (35.1)	5.1 (41.2)	6.8 (44.2)	6.2 (43.2)	3.1 (37.6)	0.5 (32.9)	−2.8 (27.0)	−4.6 (23.7)	0.0 (31.9)
Record low °C (°F)	−20.8 (−5.4)	−22.6 (−8.7)	−23.2 (−9.8)	−21.2 (−6.2)	−13.2 (8.2)	−2.4 (27.7)	−0.6 (30.9)	−3.2 (26.2)	−8.3 (17.1)	−12.8 (9.0)	−18.6 (−1.5)	−21.0 (−5.8)	−23.2 (−9.8)
Average precipitation mm (inches)	112.5 (4.43)	93.0 (3.66)	92.6 (3.65)	72.8 (2.87)	29.3 (1.15)	37.2 (1.46)	35.1 (1.38)	48.2 (1.90)	77.7 (3.06)	114.3 (4.50)	119.9 (4.72)	99.2 (3.91)	931.8 (36.69)
Average relative humidity (%)	81	81	79	77	77	76	79	81	79	80	81	80	79
Average dew point °C (°F)	−2 (28)	−3 (27)	−4 (25)	−2 (28)	1 (34)	5 (41)	7 (45)	7 (45)	4 (39)	0 (32)	−2 (28)	−3 (27)	1 (33)
Source 1: Icelandic Met Office (extremes 1961–1997)
Source 2: Time and Date (humidity and dewpoints, 2005-2015)

Coastal temperature data for Ísafjörður
Month	Jan	Feb	Mar	Apr	May	Jun	Jul	Aug	Sep	Oct	Nov	Dec	Year
Average sea temperature °C (°F)	3.3 (37.94)	3.3 (37.94)	3.0 (37.40)	3.1 (37.58)	4.7 (40.46)	6.9 (44.42)	9.1 (48.38)	10.4 (50.72)	9.6 (49.28)	7.2 (44.96)	5.7 (42.26)	4.2 (39.56)	5.9 (42.58)
Source 1: Seatemperature.net

== Overview ==
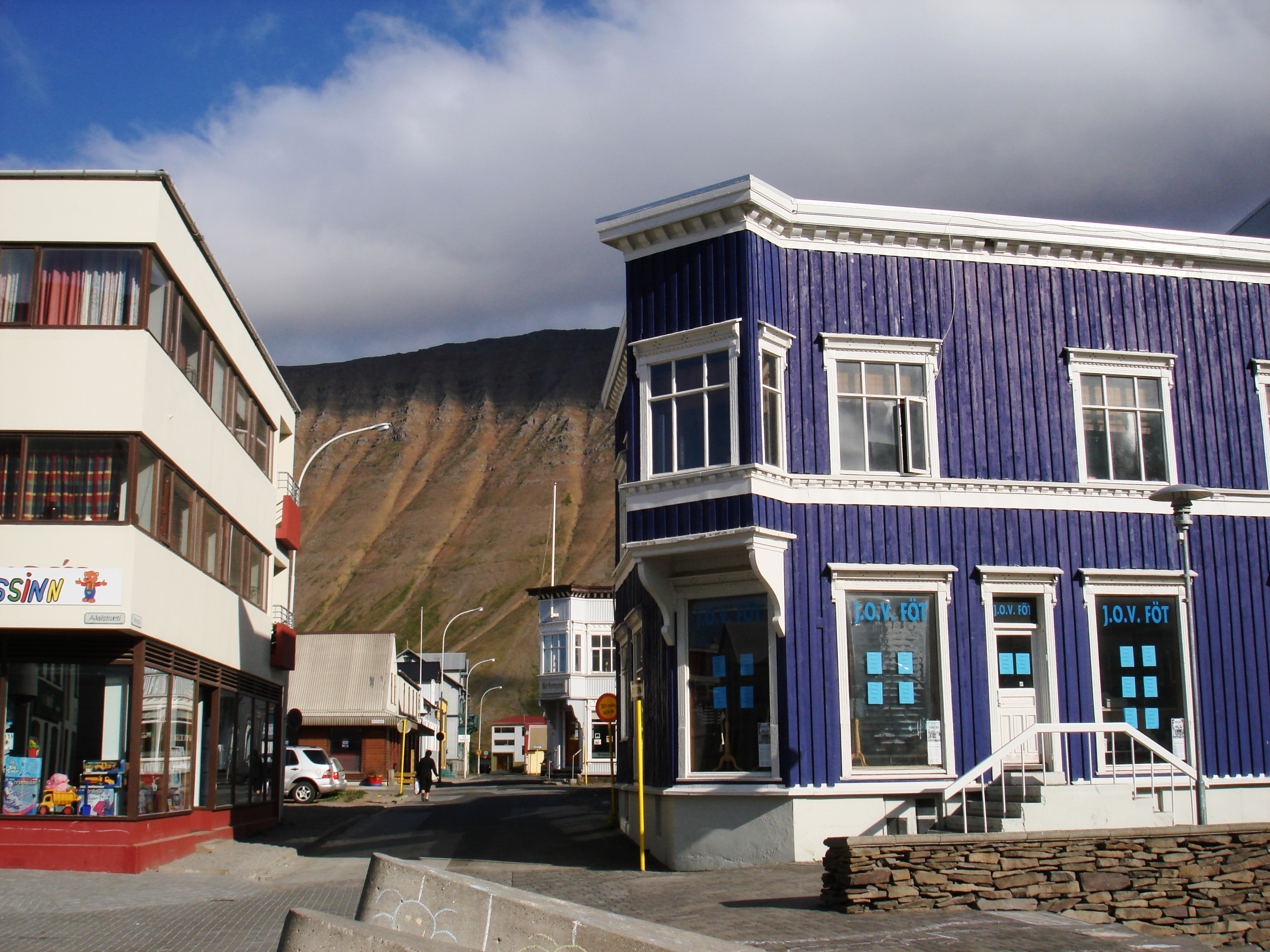
Town centre

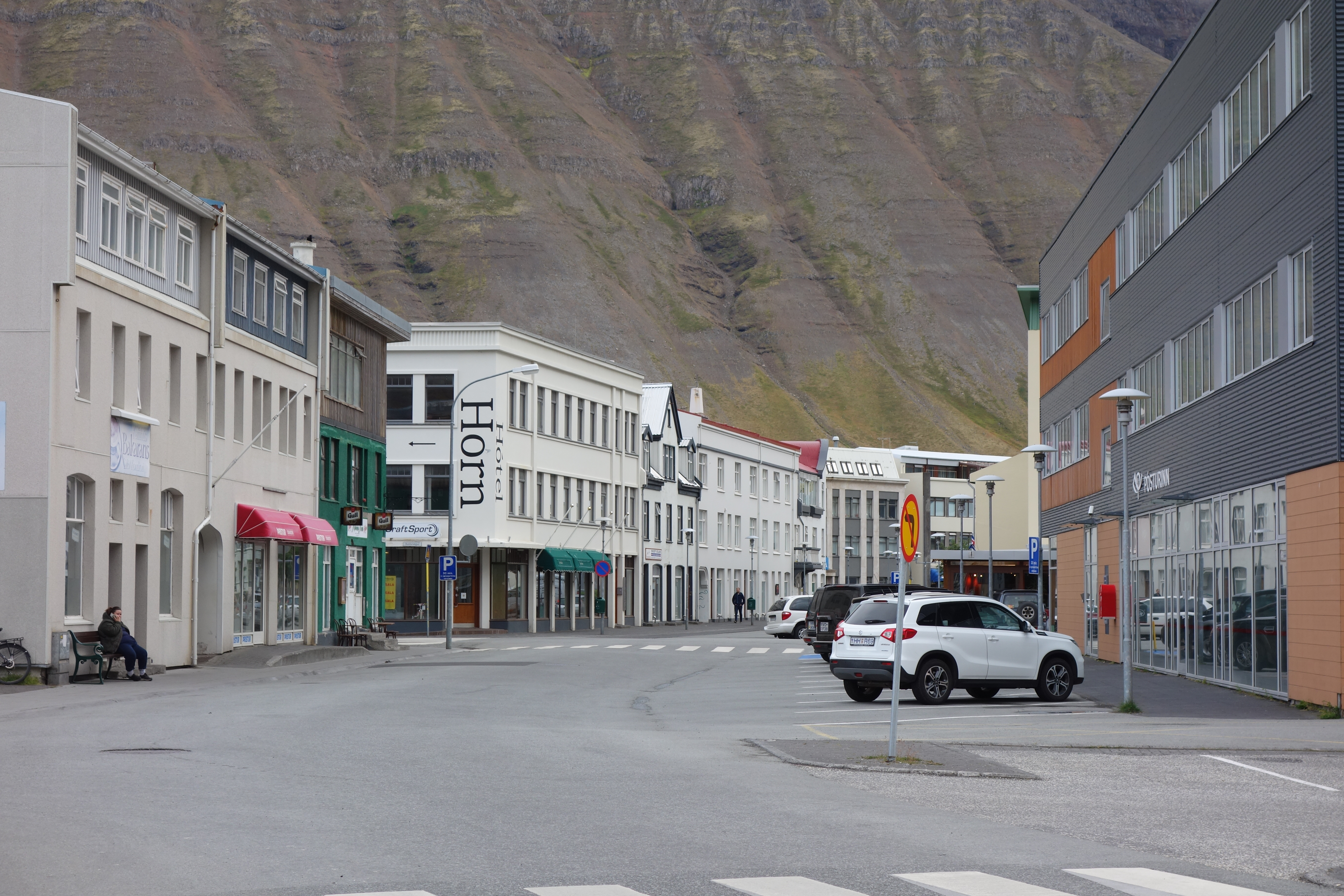
Hafnarstræti

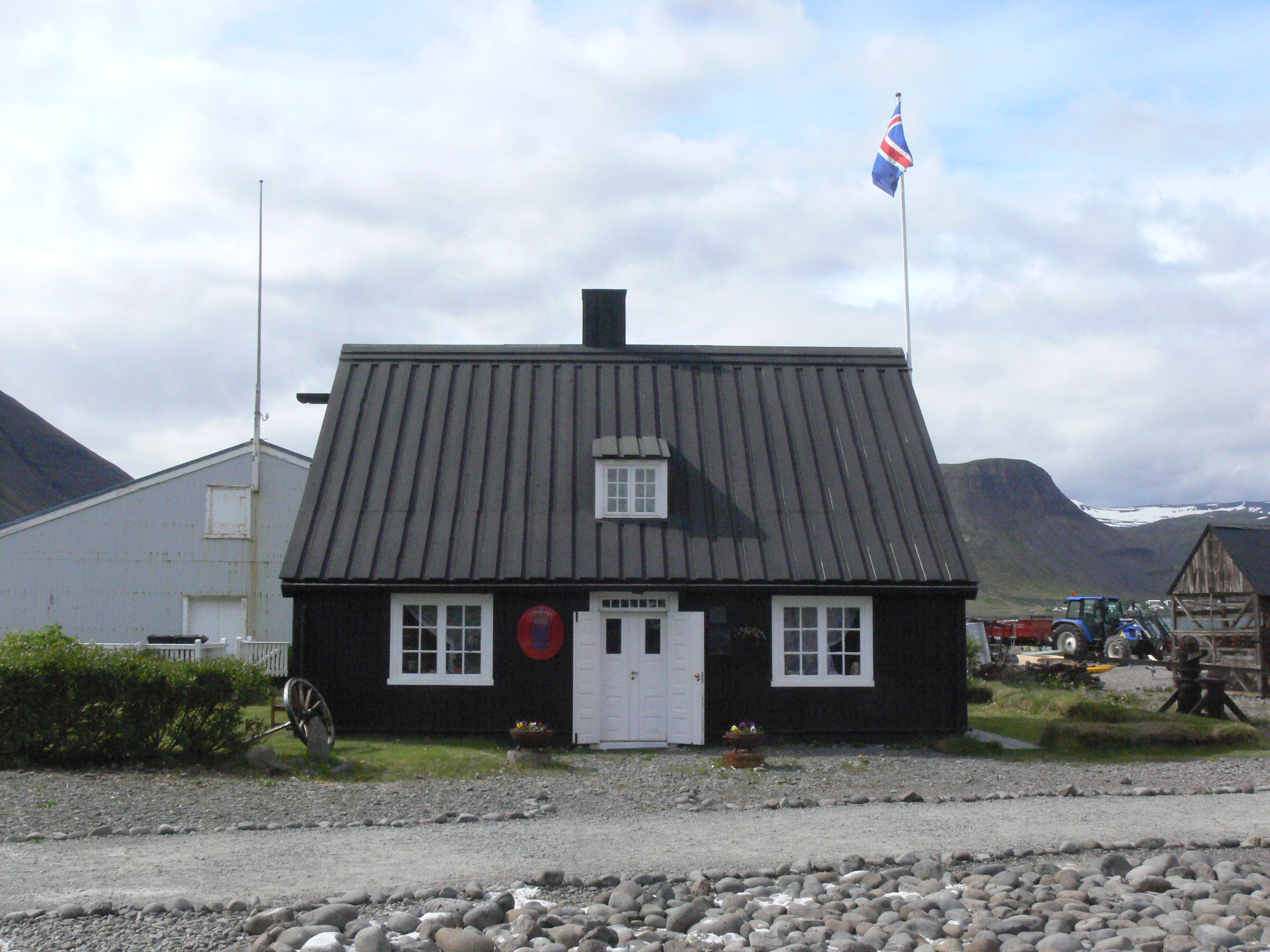
Faktorshúsið in Neðstikaupstaður in Ísafjörður (built 1765)

The town is connected by road and a 5.4 kilometres (3.4 miles) road tunnel to Bolungarvík which lies 15 km (9 mi) to the northwest, and to the village of Súðavík to the east. The partly one-lane Vestfjarðagöng (Vestfirðir Tunnel), completed in 1996, leads to the towns of Flateyri and Suðureyri, and to the western parts of the Westfjords. Ísafjörður has an airport with regular flights to Reykjavík.

Fishing has been the main industry in Ísafjörður, and the town has one of the largest fisheries in Iceland. A severe decline in the fishing industry for a variety of reasons, such as fishing restrictions in the early 1980s, and a decline in the fish population, has led the inhabitants to seek work elsewhere, leading to a decline in the town's population. The harbor also serves ferries to nearby settlements as well as larger cruise ships for tourists visiting the area. The tourist industry is growing; it is a major access point to the nature reserve on the Hornstrandir Peninsula, an uninhabited wilderness area to which ferries run daily during summer.

Despite its size, small population, and historical isolation from the rest of the country, the town has a relatively urban atmosphere. Ísafjörður has a school of music, as well as a hospital. The older former hospital building now accommodates a cultural center with a library and showrooms. Recently, the small town has become known in the country as a center for alternative music outside of Iceland. A yearly festival, Aldrei fór ég suður, provides a platform for local musicians and bands from around Iceland and even from overseas. A university center, Háskólasetur Vestfjarða, which acts as a distance learning center for the 7,000 residents of the Westfjords as well as provides graduate education and research on coastal issues, was established in March 2005.

== Education ==
Ísafjörður is the home to the University Centre of the Westfjords. The University Centre is a research, graduate education and distance learning center. The University Centre offers three programs: Coastal & Marine Management, Icelandic language, and Coastal Communities and Regional Development. These programs are accredited by the University of Akureyri which is accredited by the Ministry of Culture, Innovation and Higher Education.

The only gymnasium located in the Westfjords, Menntaskólinn á Ísafirði, is in Ísafjörður. The students range from 16 to 20 years of age, as is traditional in Icelandic gymnasia.

== Business ==
Major employers in the region include Arctic Fish, Hraðfrystihúsið-Gunnvör, Íslandssaga, Klofningur, Orkubú Vestfjarða and Skaginn 3X. Ísafjörður is also the base of several noteworthy start-up companies including Fossadalur and Kerecis.

== Culture ==
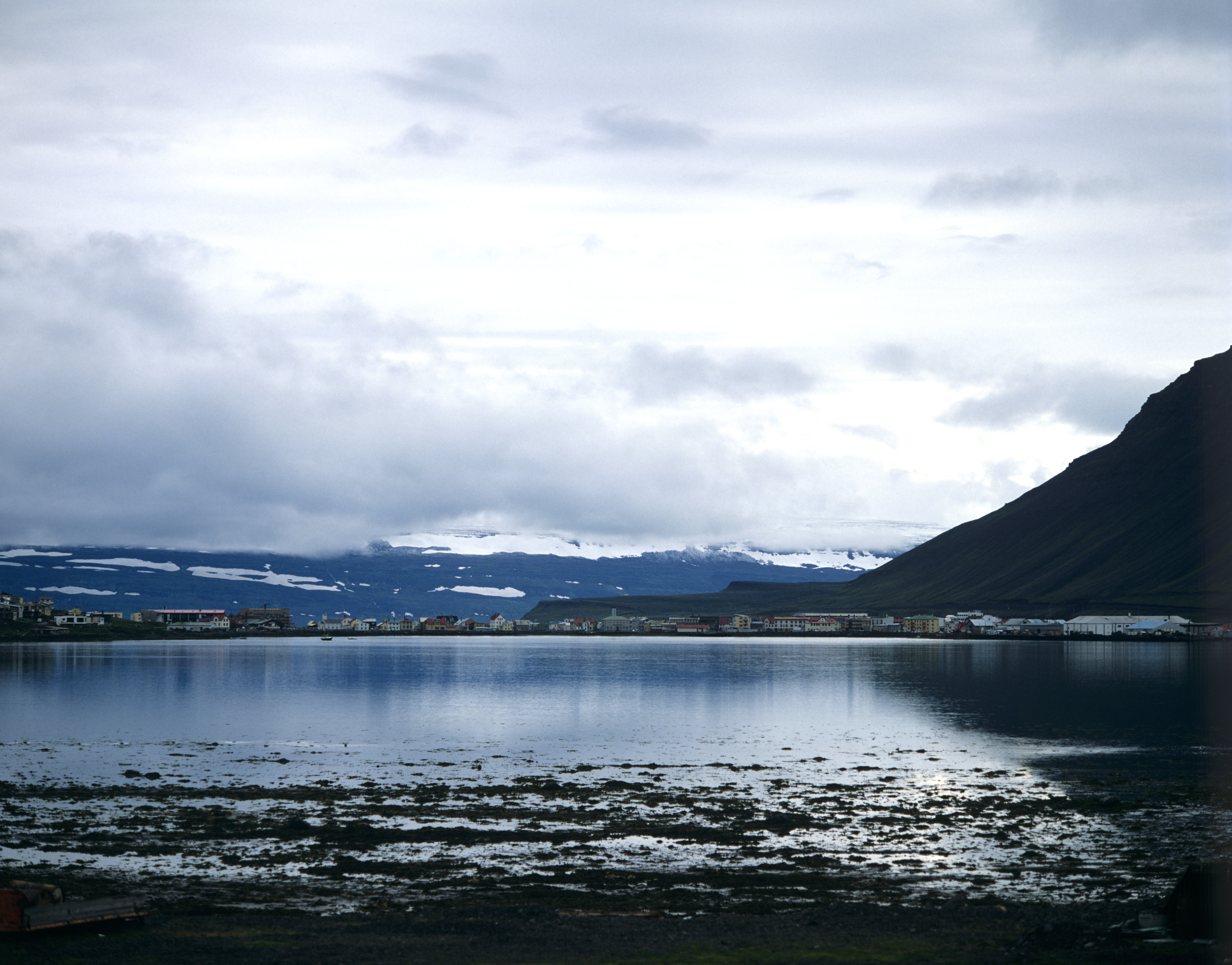

The town hosts varied and widely popular events, in the realms of both culture and outdoor recreation. These events include, but are not limited to:

- The Ski Week Festival
- Aldrei fór ég suður music festival
- Fossavatnsgangan cross country skiing competition
- Við Djúpið Music Festival
- European Swampsoccer Championships
- Act Alone – a theatre festival dedicated to the art of acting alone, monodrama, held in August every year
- Westfjords Heritage Museum

=== Annual music festivals ===
Aldrei fór ég suður – Ísafjörður Rock Festival

In 2004, Ísafjörður's own Mugison (a.k.a. Örn Elías Guðmundsson) and his father organized the first Aldrei fór ég suður Music Festival as a free concert to support the burgeoning music community in Ísafjörður. The event has been established as an annual festival in mid April. The name Aldrei fór ég suður (I never went south) is taken from a Bubbi Morthens song of the same name, and may refer to a movement among young Icelanders to establish cultural events outside Reykjavík, and draw attention back to the nation's roots in the countryside. The festival's subtitle is "rokkhátið alþýðunnar" or "rock festival for the people."

Við Djúpið Music Festival

Since its inception in 2003, the Við Djúpið Music Festival has offered master classes and concerts featuring distinguished artists from Iceland and around the world. Notable past participants include renowned cellist Erling Blöndal Bengtsson, pianist Vovka Ashkenazy, and the acclaimed Pacifica Quartet. In 2007, clarinetist and composer Evan Ziporyn, a member of the celebrated group Bang on a Can, led a master class and performed in Ísafjörður. The following year, 2008, saw performances from Finnish violinist Pekka Kuusisto, pianist Simon Crawford-Phillips, and Norwegian pianist Håkon Austbø. The festival has also hosted unique and collaborative performances by Decoda, an affiliate ensemble of Carnegie Hall, and the innovative Orchester im Treppenhaus from Germany.

== Sports ==
Ísafjörður is the home of Íþróttafélagið Vestri and Knattspyrnufélagið Hörður multi-sports clubs. Vestri fields departments in basketball, football, volleyball and bicycling. Its men's and women's basketball teams have played in the top-tier basketball leagues in the country while its men's volleyball team was promoted to the top-tier division in 2019.

Knattspyrnufélagið Hörður was originally a football club but has fielded other departments, most prominently in handball, track & field, skiing and Icelandic wrestling.

=== Other sport clubs ===
- Skíðafélag Ísfirðinga - Skiing
- Golfklúbbur Ísafjarðar - Golf
- Skotíþróttafélag Ísafjarðar - Shooting sports

== Notable natives and residents ==
- Agnes M. Sigurðardóttir – Bishop of Iceland (2012–2024)
- Ólafur Ragnar Grímsson – President of Iceland (1996–2016)

=== Artists ===
- Árný Margrét – Musician
- Helgi Björnsson – Musician and actor
- Mugison – Musician

=== Athletes ===
==== Basketball ====
- Birgir Örn Birgisson – Former Icelandic national basketball team player
- Sigurður Þorsteinsson – Icelandic national basketball team player

==== Cycling ====
- Arna Sigríður Albertsdóttir – para-cyclist who competed at the 2020 Summer Paralympics

==== Football ====
- Björn Helgason – former member of the Icelandic men's national football team
- Emil Pálsson – caps for the Icelandic men's national football team
- Jón Oddsson – former member of the Icelandic men's national football team and the Icelandic track and field national team.
- Ómar Torfason – former member of the Icelandic men's national football team
- Matthías Vilhjálmsson – caps for the Icelandic men's national football team
- Stella Hjaltadóttir – former member of the Icelandic women's national football team

==== Skiing ====
- Arnór Gunnarsson – former Olympic skier
- Árni Sigurðsson – former Olympic skier
- Ásta Halldórsdóttir – former Olympic skier
- Daníel Jakobsson – former Olympic skier
- Einar Valur Kristjánsson – former Olympic skier
- Einar Ólafsson – former Olympic skier
- Guðmundur Jóhannsson – former Olympic skier
- Gunnar Pétursson – former Olympic skier
- Jakobína Jakobsdóttir – former Olympic skier
- Oddur Pétursson – former Olympic skier
- Sigurður Jónsson – former Olympic skier
- Steinþór Jakobsson – former Olympic skier
