= List of bands from Iceland =

This is a list of musical bands from the country of Iceland.

For listing of singers from Iceland, see List of Icelandic singers.

For singer-songwriters from Iceland, see List of singer-songwriters#Iceland

== 0-9 ==
- 200.000 naglbítar

== A ==
- ADHD
- Agent Fresco
- Amiina
- Ampop
- Apparat Organ Quartet
- Á Móti Sól
- Árstíðir

== B ==
- Bang Gang
- Benny Crespo's Gang
- Borko

== C ==
- Changer

== D ==
- Dead Skeletons
- Dikta
- Dimma

== Ð ==
- Ðe lónlí blú bojs

== E ==
- Egó
- Elektra
- Eurobandið

== F ==
- Feldberg
- FM Belfast
- For a Minor Reflection
- Fræbbblarnir

== G ==
- Grýlurnar
- GusGus

== H ==
- Hatari

== I ==
- Ingó og Veðurguðirnir

== J ==
- Jagúar
- Jakobínarína
- JFDR
- Júníus Meyvant
- Just Another Snake Cult

== K ==
- Kukl
- Klassart
- kimono
- Kaleo
- Kiasmos

== L ==
- Leaves

== M ==
- Mammút
- Mezzoforte
- Merzedes Club
- Mínus
- Misþyrming
- Mugison
- Múm

== N ==
- Nylon

== O ==
- Of Monsters and Men

== P ==
- Pollapönk

== Q ==
- Quarashi

== R ==
- Retro Stefson
- Reykjavíkurdætur
- Rökkurró

== S ==
- Sálin hans Jóns míns
- Samaris
- Seabear
- Sin Fang
- Sign
- Sigur Rós
- Singapore Sling
- Ske
- Skálmöld
- Slowblow
- Sóley
- Sólstafir
- The Sugarcubes
- Stafrænn Hákon
- Steed Lord
- Stuðmenn
- Sykur
- Systur

== T ==
- Thor's Hammer
- Trabant
- Trúbrot
- The Vintage Caravan

== U ==
- Utangarðsmenn

== V ==
- Valdimar
- The Vintage Caravan
- Vök
- Væb

== Þ ==
- Þeyr
- Þursaflokkurinn
