= List of Icelandic singers =

This is a list of singers from Iceland.

== A ==
- Ólafur Arnalds
- Ólöf Arnalds
- Arnór Dan Arnarson
- Ásgeir

== B ==
- Ragnar Bjarnason, a.k.a. Raggi Bjarna
- Björk
- Hera Björk
- Sjonni Brink

== D ==
- Daði Freyr
- Friðrik Dór

== E ==
- Eivør (Eivør Pálsdóttir) (Faroese but well-recognized in Iceland)
- Kári Egilsson
- Emmsjé Gauti

== G ==
- Ragnheiður Gröndal
- Jóhanna Guðrún
- Eyþór Ingi Gunnlaugsson

== H ==
- Björgvin Halldórsson
- Hafdís Huld
- Hera Hjartardóttir
- Hilmar Örn Hilmarsson
- Högni Egilsson

== J ==
- Jófríður Ákadóttir
- Jónsi
- Jón Jónsson
- Júníus Meyvant (Unnar Gísli Sigurmundsson)

== L ==
- Lay Low
- Leoncie
- Low Roar
- Laufey

== M ==
- Megas (Magnús Þór Jónsson)
- Bubbi Morthens
- Mugison

== O ==
- Ari Ólafsson
- Paul Oscar

== P ==
- Prins Póló
- Pascal Pinon
- Paul Oscar

== R ==
- Ragga Gísla

== S ==
- Jónas Sigurðsson
- Snorri Snorrason
- Sóley
- Greta Salóme
- Sigur Rós
- Svala

== T ==
- Ásgeir Trausti
- Emilíana Torrini

== V ==
- Hildur Vala
- Vilhjálmur Hólmar Vilhjálmsson

== Á ==
- Ásgeir Trausti a.k.a. Ásgeir
- Magni Ásgeirsson

== Ö ==
- Arnbjörg Auður Örnólfsdóttir

== See also ==
- List of Icelandic visual artists
- List of Icelandic writers
- List of bands from Iceland
