= Independent People (TV program) =

Icelandic interview TV show

Independent People (Icelandic: Sjálfstætt fólk), was an Icelandic television interview and talk show hosted by Jón Ársæll Þórðarson, journalist and psychologist. The program was aired on the TV channel Stöð 2 in Iceland from 2001 to 2015. It has been nominated eight times to the Edda Awards: in 2002, 2006, 2008, 2010 and 2011, and it received the awards in 2003, 2004 and 2005.

Independent People was produced by Steingrímur Jón Þórðarson and Sky Productions and was aired weekly early Sunday nights on Stöð 2 / Channel 2, from September until May.

Jón Ársæll interviewed people of all ages. His youngest was 15-year-old singer Yohanna and the oldest interviewees were in their nineties. Normally, but not always, they were also well known in Iceland.

== Guests ==
2012	Aired
Magnús Kjartansson Musician	08.01.2012
Margrét Frímannsdóttir former politician	15.01.2012
Þorsteinn Kjartansson "Steini í Hippakoti"	22.01.2012
Pétur Kristján Guðmundsson	29.01.2012
Jón Óttar Ragnarsson and Margrét Hrafnsdóttir Producers in LA	05.02.2012
Eiríkur G. Stephensen and Hjörleifur Hjartarson Musicians in Hundur í óskilum	12.02.2012
Sigurður Ragnar Þórðarson - Siggi Stormur	19.02.2012
Theoóór Júlíusson Actor	26.02.2012
Þórunn Erna Clausen Actress	04.03.2012
Reynir Traustason	11.03.2012
Ari Eldjárn Comedian	18.03.2012
Vigdís Hauksdóttir politician	25.03.2012
Stefán Karl Stefánsson Actor	01.04.2012
Einar Bollason	15.04.2012
Margrét Pála Ólafsdóttir]	22.04.2012
Hugrún Ragnarsson - Huggy	29.04.2012
Agnes M. Sigurðardóttir Bishup	06.05.2012
Völundur Snær Völundarson Chef	13.05.2012
Anita Briem Actress in LA	30.09.2012
Jóhannes Jónsson Iceland/Bonus	07.10.2012
Áslaug Magnúsdóttir Moda Operandi NY	14.10.2012
Friðrik Pálsson Rangá	21.10.2012
Anna Mjöll Ólafsdóttir Singer in LA	28.10.2012
Jón Björgvinsson Foreign Correspondent for RUV	04.11.2012
Helgi Hjörvar politician	11.04.2012
Illugi Gunnarsson politician	18.11.2012
Jón Jónsson musician	25.11.2012
Styrmir Gunnarsson	02.12.2012

2011	Aired
Edda Heiðrún Backman Actress	11.12.2011
Amal Tamimi Politician	04.12.2011
Guðrún Ebba Ólafsdóttir	27.11.2011
Þorsteinn Guðmundsson Actor / Comedian	20.11.2011
Sigurður Pétursson - Iceman in Greenland - Ísmaðurinn á Grænlandi Part One	06.11.2011
Sigurður Pétursson - Iceman in Greenland - Ísmaðurinn á Grænlandi Part Two	13.11.2011
Gísli Gíslason Entrepreneur/Attorney	30.10.2011
Gísli Rúnar Jónsson Actor/Director/author	27.11.2011
Karólína Lárusdóttir Artist/Painter	16.10.2011
Karl Berndsen Hairdresser/Make-up Artist	09.10.2011
Ástþór Skúlason Farmer	02.10.2011
Erró - Guðmundur Guðmundsson Artist in Paris	25.09.2011
Lalli Johns	22.05.2011
Björgvin Franz Gíslason Actor	15.05.2011
Guðmundur Steingrímsson Politician/Musician	08.05.2011
Bjartmar Guðlaugsson Musician	01.05.2011
Friðrik Dór Jónsson Musician	17.04.2011
Hilmir Snær Guðnason Actor	10.04.2011
Eyjólfur Kristjánsson Musician	03.04.2011
Jóhannes Kristjánsson Actor/Impersonator	20.03.2011
Ketill Larsen Actor	13.03.2011
Þröstur Leó Gunnarsson Actor	27.02.2011
Hrafn Gunnlaugsson Film Director	20.02.2011
Þór Saari Politician	13.02.2011
Steindi Jr. - Steinþór Hróar Steinþórsson - Actor	06.02.2011
Vala Grand	30.01.2011
Sigrún, Sævar and Óli Pétur Homeless people	23.01.2011
Simmi og Jói - Sigmar Vilhjálmsson og Jóhannes Ásbjörnsson Radio hosts and owners at HamburgerFactory	16.01.2011
Icelanders in China	09.01.2011

2010	Aired
Gunnar Eyjólfsson Actor	19.12.2010
Ragnar Bjarnason Singer	12.12.2010
Tora Victoria	05.12.2010
Ólafur Jónsson Scientist	28.11.2010
Jóhann Friðgeir	21.11.2010
Elín Hirst Journalist	14.11.2010
Valgeir Guðjónsson and Ásta Kristrún Ragnarsdóttir	07.11.2010
Sigurður Guðmundsson in China	31.10.2010
Jónína Benediktsdóttir and Gunnar Þorsteinsson Priest at Krossinn	24.10.2010
Bjarni Karlsson Priest	17.10.2010
Ásdís Rán - Icequeen - Celebrity	10.10.2010
Ögmundur Jónasson Politician	03.10.2010
Hendrikka Waage Jewellery Designer	26.09.2010
Helgi Vilhjálmsson Owner at Goa/KFC	06.06.2010
Andri Snær Magnason Author	30.05.2010
Gaui Litli - Guðjón Sigmundsson	16.05.2010
Gylfi Magnússon Politician	09.05.2010
Hilmar Örn Hilmarsson Musician	02.05.2010
Fár undir fjöllum - Volcano at Eyjafjallajökull	25.04.2010
Davíð Þór Jónsson Comedian/Priest	18.04.2010
Birgitta Jónsdóttir Politician	11.04.2010
Pétur Þorsteinsson Neologist and Vicar	04.04.2010
Halldór Einarsson at Henson	28.03.2010
Baltasar Kormákur Film Director/Producer	21.03.2010
Gunnar Sigurðsson	14.03.2010
Bubbi Morthens Musician	07.03.2010
Spaugstofan Comedy Group	28.02.2010
Geir Jón Þórisson Police Superintendent	21.02.2010
Haffi Haff	14.02.2010
Steingrímur Hermannsson Former Politician	07.02.2010
Steingrímur J. Sigfússon Politician	31.01.2010
Krýsuvík	24.01.2010
Einar Már Guðmundsson Author	17.01.2010
Fjölnir Þorgeirsson Snooker Champion	10.01.2010

2009	Aired
Ólafur Elíasson Artist	27.12.2009
Vilhjálmur Eyjólfsson Farmer at Hnausum	20.12.2009
Andrea Róberts	13.12.2009
Ármann Þorvaldsson Former UK Head at Kaupthing Bank Part 2	06.12.2009
Ármann Þorvaldsson Former UK Head at Kaupthing Bank Part 1	29.11.2009
Katrín Júlíusdóttir Politician	22.11.2009
Geirmundur Valtýsson Musician	15.11.2009
Gérard Lemarquis	08.11.2009
Flosi Ólafsson - In Memoriam - Actor	01.11.2009
Magnús Eiríksson Musician	25.10.2009
Sverrir Þór Sverrisson - Sveppi - TV personality	18.10.2009
Ingólfur Þórarinsson - Ingó og Veðurguðirnir - Musician	11.10.2009
Heiðar Jónsson	04.10.2009
Ilmur Kristjánsdóttir Actress	27.09.2009
Helgi Björnsson	20.09.2009
Dalai Lama	07.06.2009
Sigrún Pálína Ingvarsdóttir Part 2	31.05.2009
Sigrún Pálína Ingvarsdóttir Part 1	24.05.2009
Vilhjálmur Bjarnason Businessman and lecturer at University of Iceland	17.05.2009
Sigmundur Ernir Rúnarsson Journalist/Politician	10.05.2009
Valgerður Matthíasdóttir	03.05.2009
Politicians	26.04.2009
Páll at Húsafell	19.04.2009
The Munks at Reyðarfjörður	12.04.2009
Bjarni Benediktsson Politician	05.04.2009
Siggi Hall Celebrity Chef	29.03.2009
Musicians	22.03.2009
Katrín Jakobsdóttir Politician	15.03.2009
Auður Haralds Author	08.03.2009
Guðný Halldórsdóttir Director	01.03.2009
Gunnar Marel Eggertsson Maker of Viking Ship Íslendingur	22.02.2009
Sigmundur Davíð Gunnlaugsson Politician	15.02.2009
Þorvaldur Gylfason Economist	08.02.2009
Protestants	01.02.2009
Svava Johansen Fashion Chain NTC	25.01.2009
Arnþór Helgason	18.01.2009
Oddur F. Helgason Genealogist	11.01.2009
Best of 2008	04.01.2009

2008	Aired	Trailer
Sæmi Rokk - Sæmundur Pálsson - Policeman and Dancer	21.12.2008	
Rúni Júll - Rúnar Júlíusson - In Memoriam - Musician	14.12.2008	
Stefán Máni Sigþórsson Author	07.12.2008	
Akeem Richard Oppong TV host	30.11.2008	
Geir H. Haarde Politician	23.11.2008	
Valdís Óskarsdóttir Film Editor	16.11.2008	
Vigdís Finnbogadóttir Former President of Iceland	09.11.2008	
Sverrir and Magnus at Kirkjubæjarklaustur	02.11.2008	
Haunted House at Hjalteyri	26.10.2008	
Björgvin G. Sigurðsson Politician	19.10.2008	
Lýður Árnason Doctor/Film Producer	12.10.2008	
Jón Ólafsson Businessman	05.10.2008	
Hugleikur Dagsson Author	28.09.2008	
Best of 2008	22.06.2008	
Hafsteinn at Flatey	15.06.2008	
Kristinn Jón Guðmundsson	08.06.2008	
Bjarni Haukur Þórsson Actor	01.06.2008	
Beggi og Pacas Celebrities	25.05.2008	
Jakob Frimann Magnússon	18.05.2008	
Best of Jón Gnarr and Pétur Jóhann	11.05.2008	
Sturla Jónsson Protestant	04.05.2008	
Ari Garðar Georgsson Chef	27.04.2008	
Bragi Ásgeirsson Painter	20.04.2008	
Geir Ólafsson Singer	13.04.2008	
Ólöf Pétursdóttir	06.04.2008	
Halla Linker Part 2	30.03.2008	
Halla Linker Part 1	23.03.2008	
Egill "Gilz" Einarsson	16.03.2008	
Gísli Örn Garðarsson	09.03.2008	
Alexandra Kjuregej Argunova Artist	02.03.2008	
Bergþór Pálsson Opera Singer	24.02.2008	
Ingvi Hrafn Jónsson TV presenter	17.02.2008	
Hanna Birna Kristjánsdóttir Politician	10.02.2008	
Jón Gnarr	03.02.2008	
Hafliði H. Jónsson	27.01.2008	
Vigdís Grímsdóttir Author	20.01.2008	
Gylfi Ægisson Musician	13.01.2008	
Kristján Tómas Ragnarsson Doctor at Mount Sinai	06.01.2008	

2007	Aired
Best of 2006-2007	20.05.2007
Jón Ásgeir Jóhannesson	13.05.2007
Mugison Musician	06.05.2007
Kjartan Ragnarsson] Actor	29.04.2007
Halla Margret Árnadóttir Singer	22.04.2007
Kristján Jóhannsson Singer	08.04.2007
Pétur Jóhann Sigfússon Actor	01.04.2007
Elías Davíðsson	18.03.2007
Einar Bárðarson Agent	11.03.2007
Barði Jóhannsson - Bang Gang - Musician	04.03.2007
Bjarni Ármannsson Former CEO at Islandsbanki	25.02.2007
Arnþrúður Karlsdottir Owner of Radio Saga	18.02.2007
Eggert Magnússon Chairman of Westham United	11.02.2007
Jón Magnússon Politician	04.02.2007
Bjarni Harðarson Journalist	28.01.2007
Best of 2006-2007	14.01.2007
Best of 2006-2007	21.01.2007
Kjartan Halldórsson	07.01.2007
