= Magnús Ólafsson (actor) =

Icelandic actor and former handball player

- Born: Siglufjörður, Iceland
- Occupations: Actor, comedian, singer
- Years active: 1962–present
- Spouse: Elísabet Sonja Harðardóttir
- Children: 4, including Hörður Magnússon
- Relatives: Stefán Karl Stefánsson (nephew)

Magnús Ólafsson is an Icelandic actor, comedian, singer, and former handball player. He became widely known his performance of the character "Bjössi Bolla" in comedy musical group Sumargleðin in the early 1980s.

== Handball career ==
Magnús Ólafsson
Sport
- Sport: Handball
- Position: Goalkeeper

Senior clubs
- Years: Team
- 197?–198?: FH

Magnús played as a goalkeeper for FH's handball team for several season, winning the Icelandic championship in 1974 and 1976 and the Icelandic Cup for three straight years from 1975 to 1977. He also won several outdoor handball national championships with FH.

== Acting and music ==
A veteran stage and film actor of several decades, he is best known for his performance of the character "Bjössi Bolla" which was created when he was a member of the comedy band Sumargleðin in the early 1980s, along with Ragnar Bjarnason, Ómar Ragnarsson, Bessi Bjarnason and Þorgeir Ástvaldsson. With Sumargleðin, he sang the hit song Prins Póló in 1981.

His acting roles include the role of Eyfi in the 1995 drama feature Agnes.

== Personal life ==
Magnús married to Elísabet Sonja Harðardóttir and with her has four children. He is the father of former footballer Hörður Magnússon and his nephew was actor Stefán Karl Stefánsson.

== Partial filmography ==
- Land og synir (1980)
- Óðal feðranna (1980)
- Hvítir mávar (1985) – Pétur Kristjánsson
- Children of Nature (1991)
- Ingaló (1992) – Seli
- Bíódagar (1994) – Hallur
- Cold Fever (1994) – Hallur
- The Viking Sagas (1994) – Bjorn
- Agnes (1995) – Eyfi
- Devil's Island (1996) – Hreggviður
- Áfram Latibær (1996) - Bæjarstjórinn
- Regina (2001) – Nonni
- Falcons (2002) – Lobbi
- Metalhead (2013) – Erlingur
