= Gabríel =

Gabríel may refer to:

- Gabríel (rapper), Icelandic rapper
- Gabriel, an archangel

== See also ==
- Gabriel (disambiguation)
