= Bríet (disambiguation) =

Bríet (born 1999) is an Icelandic singer.

Bríet may also refer to:

- Bríet Sif Hinriksdóttir (born 1996), Icelandic basketball player
- Bríet Bjarnhéðinsdóttir (1856–1940), Icelandic women's right activist
