= Kimi Records =

- Founded: 2007
- Founder: Baldvin Esra Einarsson
- Distributors: Morr Music (in Europe, USA and Japan), self distribution in Iceland
- Genre: Indie rock
- Country of origin: Iceland
- Location: Reykjavík
- Official website: http://www.kimirecords.com

Kimi Records is an Icelandic independent record label and distribution company.

== History ==
Kimi Records was founded in 2007 by Baldvin Esra Einarsson and his wife out of Akureyri, Iceland. The Kimi Records roster includes mainly Icelandic inde rock acts, but also includes bands belonging to other genres of music and despite its young age, Kimi records have also released non-Icelandic acts.

Kimi Records started out as a record company and distributed their own music on their own. The label has also distributed releases by artists such as FM Belfast, Hildur Guðnadóttir, Leaves, Seabear and Stórsveit Nix Noltes.

In 2009, Kimi Records started operating a sub-label, Brak Records, for more obscure Icelandic music. In its first year of operation it released one album a month. The same year Kimi Records started operating a more mainstream label, Borgin. Borgin is now in hiatus.

Kimi's first release was Hellvars' Bat out of Hellvar on November 22, 2007. Kimi's first compilation, Hitaveitan, saw the light of day in the summer 2010.

== Roster ==
- Benni Hemm Hemm
- Borko
- Hellvar
- Hjaltalín
- kimono
- Me, The Slumbering Napoleon
- Miri
- Morðingjarnir
- Orphic Oxtra
- Prins Póló
- Retro Stefson
- Retrön
- Reykjavík!
- Sin Fang Bous
- S.H. Draumur
- Stafrænn Hákon
- Sudden Weather Change
- Swords of Chaos
- Tape Tum

== See also ==
- List of record labels
