= Warm Blood =

Warm Blood may refer to:

- Warmbloods, a middle-weight horse type and breed
- Warm Blood, album by Carol Grimes
- "Warm Blood", song by Icelandic band Seabear on album We Built a Fire
- "Warm Blood", a 2015 song by Carly Rae Jepsen from Emotion
- "Warm Blood", a 2023 song by Matchbox Twenty from Where the Light Goes

== See also ==
- "My Warm Blood", a song by the Microphones from The Glow Pt. 2
