= Bríet =

Icelandic singer (born 1999)

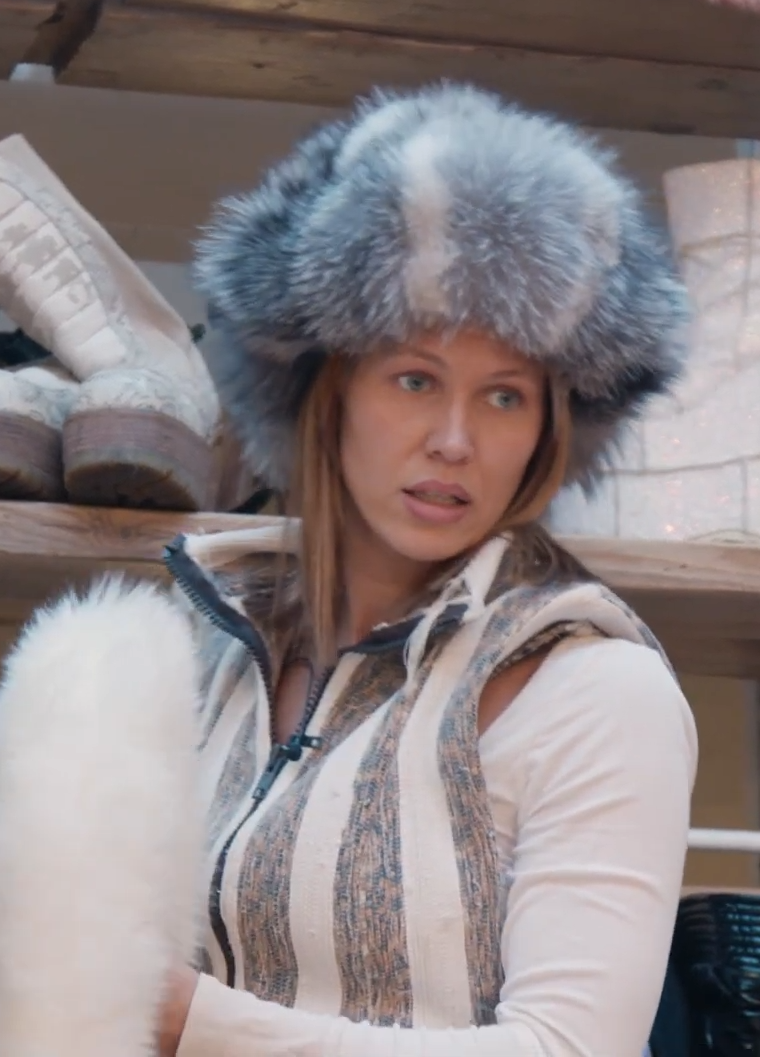
- Bríet in 2024

Background information
- Born: Bríet Ísis Elfar; 22 March 1999 (age 27); Reykjavík, Iceland
- Genre: Pop
- Years active: 2018–present

Bríet Ísis Elfar (born 22 March 1999), known mononymously as Bríet, (Note: Pronounced BREE-yet, [ˈpriːjɛt]) is an Icelandic singer known for her songs "Esjan", "Feimin(n)", and "Rólegur kúreki". Her album Kveðja, Bríet was selected as the album of the year at the 2021 Icelandic Music Awards.

== Early life ==
Bríet was born in Reykjavík and studied at Menntaskólinn við Hamrahlíð. She began performing at off-venue concerts at Iceland Airwaves at the age of 15 in addition to singing at jazz bars.

== Career ==
Bríet sings in Icelandic and English and writes her songs in collaboration with Pálmi Ragnar Ásgeirsson, who is a member of the music production team StopWaitGo. Her first single, "In Too Deep", came out in 2018. She performed "Feimin(n)" with Aron Can.

Her album Kveðja, Bríet came out in 2020. The music is a mix of Scandinavian pop music and country music. Break-ups are the main theme of the album and Bríet received praise for her lyrical talent. Kveðja, Bríet was Rás 2's Album of the Week for a week in October and eight songs from the album made it to Spotify's Top 10 list for Iceland.

== Discography ==
=== Albums and EPs ===
- 22.03.99 (EP, 2018)
- Kveðja, Bríet (2020)

=== Singles ===
List of singles, with selected chart positions
Title	Year	Peak chart positions	Album
Title	Year	ISL	Album
"Feimin(n)" (with palmi. and Aron Can)	2018	—	Non-album singles
"Carousel" (with Greyskies)	2018	—	Non-album singles
"Dino"	2019	—	Non-album singles
"Day Drinking" (with Black Saint)	2019	—	Non-album singles
"Esjen"	2020	—	Non-album singles
"Heyrðu mig"	2020	—	Non-album singles
"Cold Feet"	2022	12	Non-album singles
"Flugdreki"	2022	5	Non-album singles
"Venus" (with Ásgeir)	2023	2	Non-album singles
"—" denotes a recording that did not chart or was not released in that territory.

== Awards and nominations ==
Year	Award	Prize	Recipient	Result
2019	Icelandic Music Awards	Rising star	Herself	Won
2019	Icelandic Music Awards	Female singer of the year	Herself	Nominated
2021	Grapevine Music Awards	Artist of the year	Herself	Won
2021	Grapevine Music Awards	Song of the year	"Rólegur kúreki"	Won
2021	Hlustendaverðlaunin	Pop album of the year	Kveðja, Bríet	Won
2021	Hlustendaverðlaunin	Female singer of the year	Herself	Won
2021	Hlustendaverðlaunin	Pop artist of the year	Herself	Won
2021	Hlustendaverðlaunin	Song of the year	"Esjan"	Won
2021	Icelandic Music Awards	Pop album of the year	Kveðja, Bríet	Won
2021	Icelandic Music Awards	Female singer of the year	Herself	Won
2021	Icelandic Music Awards	Lyricist of the year	Herself	Won
2021	Icelandic Music Awards	Pop song of the year	"Esjan"	Nominated

== Personal life ==
Bríet began a relationship with the lead guitarist of Kaleo in 2020 Bríet was born in Reykjavík. Her parents are Benedikt Elfar and Ásrún Laila Awad, her grandfather on mothers side, Ómar Ahmed Hafez Awad was born in Egypt, but moved to Iceland in 1965
