= Fast forward (disambiguation) =

Fast forward is a process of quickly moving through storage media such as cassette tapes.

Fast Forward may also refer to:

== Music ==
- Fast Forward (band), a band formed in 1984 featuring vocalist Ian Lloyd
- Fast Forward (Joe Jackson album), 2015, or the title song
- Fast Forward (Spyro Gyra album), 1990
- Fast Forward (song), a song by Jeon Somi
- "Fast Forward", a song by You Me at Six from the album VI
- "Fast Forward", a song by Jagúar from the album Get the Funk Out
- "Fast Forward", a song by Prodigal from the album Electric Eye

== Publications ==
- Fast Forward (cassette magazine), a music magazine produced in Australia in the early 1980s
- Fast Forward (magazine), a children's magazine
- Fast Forward Weekly, a Canadian alternative newspaper

== Television and film ==
- Fast Forward (Austrian TV series), Austrian TV series from 2009
- Fast Forward (Australian TV series), an Australian sketch comedy show of the late 1980s and early 1990s
- Fast Forward (film), a 1985 film directed by Sidney Poitier
- Fast Forward (2009 film), an Indian Hindi-language film
- Teenage Mutant Ninja Turtles: Fast Forward, a U.S. animated TV series
- Fast Forward, a BBC children's sketch comedy show (1984-1987) starring Nick Wilton and Floella Benjamin
