= Jagúar =

Icelandic funk band

- Origin: Reykjavík, Iceland
- Genres: Funk
- Years active: 1998–present
- Label: Unsigned
- Members: Ingi S. Skúlason; Samúel Jón Samúelsson; Kjartan Hákonarson; Óskar Guðjónsson; Ómar Guðjónsson; Einar Scheving
- Past members: Daði Birgisson; Jón Indriðason; Börkur H. Birgisson; Hrafn Ásgeirsson; Birkir Mattíasson; Sigfús Óttarsson; Eyjólfur Þorleifsson; Erik Qvik; Daniel Rorke; Hjörleifur Jónsson; Jóhann Hjörleifsson
- Website: http://www.jaguar.is

Jagúar (pronounced [ˈjaːɣuːar̥]) is an Icelandic funk band formed in Reykjavík in 1998. They went international in 2000, when they performed at the "1000 years since the Vikings found America" celebration in New York City. The band gained critical acclaim for their second album, Get the Funk Out, which won the Icelandic Music Awards' 2001 "Album of the Year". The band and its many current and former members continue to be active in the Icelandic jazz scene.

== History ==
The original lineup consisted of Daði Birgisson (keyboards), Ingi S. Skúlason (bass), Jón Indriðason (drums), Börkur H. Birgisson (guitar), Hrafn Ásgeirsson (tenor sax) and Birkir Mattíasson (trumpet), who were interested in playing funk, soul and jazz. In the early days, Jagúar performed in Reykjavík, often playing covers of funk artists such as James Brown, Kool and the Gang, Herbie Hancock and others. The band was soon joined by Samúel Jón Samúelsson on trombone, along with drummer Sigfús Óttarsson (replacing Jón Indriðason). At this time, the band started working on their first album, titled Jagúar.

=== 1999–2000: Jagúar album ===
Jagúar released their debut album, Jagúar, consisting of original instrumental material, in November 1999. In January 2000, Birkir and Hrafn left the band. Soon afterward, Kjartan Hákonarsson joined the band on trumpet, and the band toured Iceland in the Summer of 2000. That same Autumn, Jagúar was a part of the "1000 years since the Vikings found America" celebration in New York City, where the band played an open-air concert at Pier 17.

=== 2001–2002: Get the Funk Out and Album of the Year win ===
The band's second album, Get the Funk Out, was released in June 2001, along with the film Jagúar, the Movie, a B-movie spin off. Eyjólfur Þorleifsson then joined the band on tenor saxophone, and Jagúar toured Iceland again in the summer of 2001, when they met Norwegian band The Real Ones. In September 2001, Jagúar went to Sweden to open for the Swedish rock band Sator.

In February 2002, Get the Funk Out received the "Icelandic Music Award" for 2001 Album of the Year. Drummer Sigfús left the band in February 2002, was briefly replaced by Erik Qvik, and then returned in July. That March, the band went to Norway and toured alongside The Real Ones. Trombone player Samúel started adding more vocals to Jagúar's music, and the band toured Belgium and the Netherlands.

=== 2003–2004: Touring and Dance You Idiot! ===
In early 2003, Óskar Guðjónsson replaced Eyjólfur on saxophone, and Jagúar played their debut show in the United Kingdom at The Jazz Café in London. In April, the band played a late night show after their longtime hero Maceo Parker in Brussels, Belgium. Then Óskar was replaced by Australian saxophonist Daniel Rorke. That May, the band went on a three-week tour through Belgium, the Netherlands, Germany, Switzerland, Austria and the UK. In September, the band returned to The Jazz Café to promote their first UK release, That's Your Problem Baby on Freestyle Records. In October 2003, the band participated in a Tribute to Motown Show at Broadway theater, performing many of their favorite Motown songs, such as Marvin Gaye's "What's Going On" and The Temptations' "Papa Was a Rolling Stone".

Jagúar appeared as a 14-piece big band at the Reykjavík Art Festival in May 2004, performing the music of Icelandic jazz composer Tómas R. Einarsson. The concert was released on a live album titled Dance You Idiot!.

=== 2004–2005: Hello Somebody ===
In July 2004, the band started working on their third album and performed at the Summer Stage festival in New York. Daniel Rorke was then replaced by Óskar again on saxophone. Jamiroquai producer Al Stone and Mr. Dynamite came to Iceland in August to work with the band on their third album. Jagúar then opened for James Brown in Reykjavík in August. The third album, Hello Somebody, was released in November 2004. Jagúar then performed with Harry Belafonte on Icelandic National Television in December. At the Icelandic Music Awards in February 2005, Jagúar received four awards including "Best performer" and "Jazz Album of the year". Sigfús left again in May and was replaced temporarily by Hjörleifur Jónsson for a tour to Sweden and UK to promote the UK release of the One Of Us single. In June, Daði and Börkur also left the band, and in August, Ómar Guðjónsson joined Jagúar on guitar and Jóhann Hjörleifsson joined on drums. Meanwhile, with the addition of Samúelsson's vocals, Hello Somebody was critically received as "easily Jagúar’s most accessible effort to date."

=== 2006–2007: Shake It Good ===
In August 2006, Jóhann was replaced by Einar Scheving on drums, and Jagúar started working on new material for their next album and preparing their live show for festivals and clubs. In February 2007, Jagúar travelled to Denmark to make their fourth album, Shake It Good. Recordings were made at Lundgård Studios in Denmark. Recordings and mix were completed at Hljóðriti, Iceland March–June, and the album was released in August 2007.

== Awards ==
To date, Jagúar has received several awards, including five Icelandic Music Awards. In 2002, Get the Funk Out won "Album of the Year", and in 2005, Jagúar received four more Icelandic Music Awards, including "Best Performer" and "Jazz Album of the Year". Additionally, in March 2003, Hello Somebody was selected as "Album of the Month" by Icelandic journal The Grapevine.

== Members ==
While many members have come and gone, some staying only a few months, the only remaining founder of the band is bassist Ingi S. Skúlason. While not a founding member, trombonist and vocalist Samúel Jón Samúelsson joined the band before the release of their debut, Jagúar. The two are currently joined by Kjartan Hákonarson (trumpet), who joined soon after the Jagúar release, and by Óskar Guðjónsson (saxophone), Ómar Guðjónsson (guitar) and Einar Scheving (drums). Drummer Jón Indriðason was the first to separate from the band in 1999 and was replaced by Sigfús Óttarsson, who played off and on until 2005. Soon after the release of Jagúar in 2000, fellow founders Hrafn Ásgeirsson (tenor sax) and Birkir Mattíasson (trumpet) were next to leave the band. Remaining founders Daði Birgisson (keyboards) and Börkur H. Birgisson (guitar) remained until 2005.

== Discography ==
=== Albums ===
- Jagúar (1999)
- Get the Funk Out (2001)
- Hello Somebody (2004)
- Shake It Good (2007)

=== Singles ===
- "That's Your Problem Baby" (2003)
- "One of Us" (2005)
- "Battle of Funk" (2006)

== See also ==
- List of bands from Iceland
