= Aron Can =

Icelandic rapper

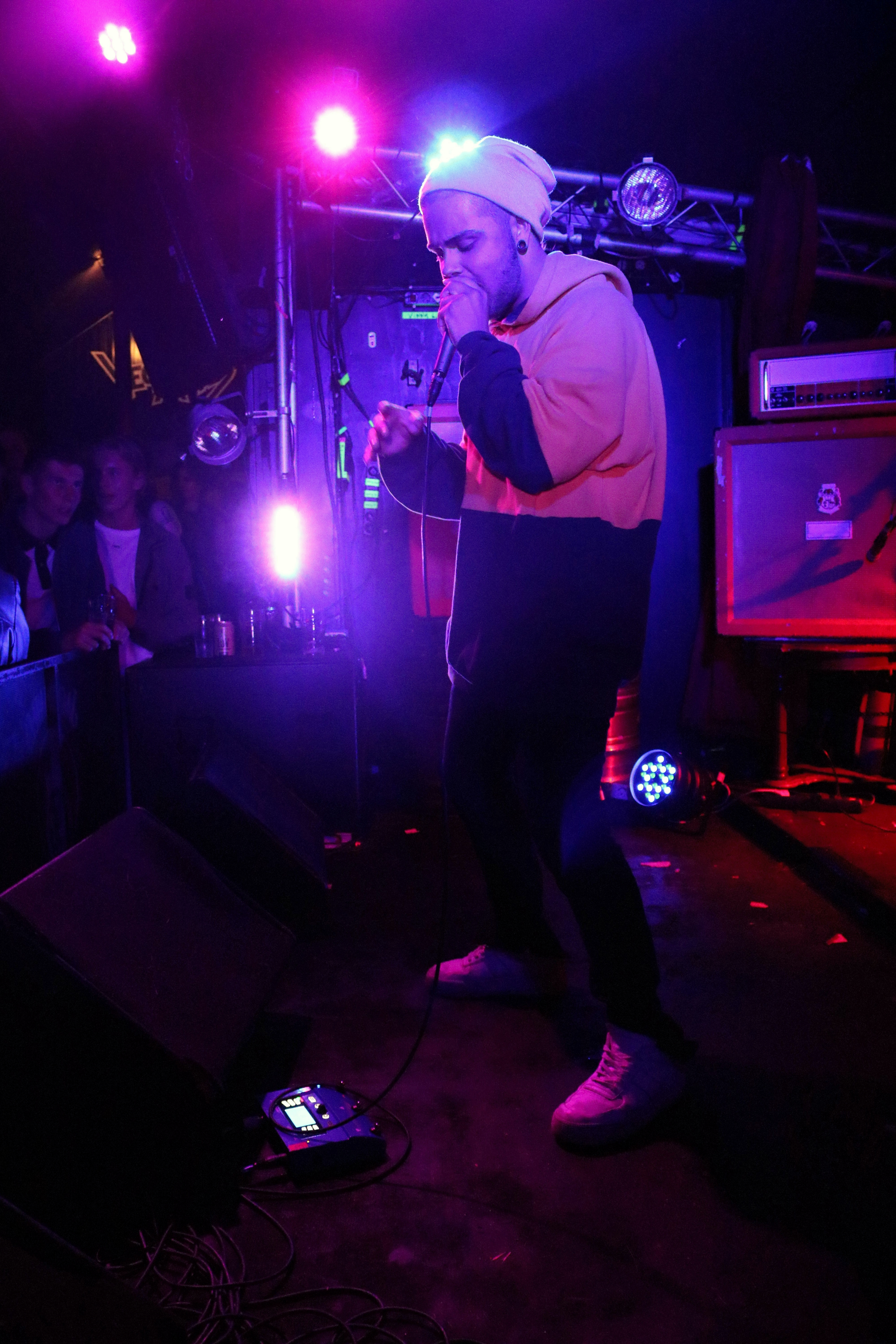
- Aron Can playing at Gaukurinn in 2018.

Background information
- Born: Aron Can Gültekin; 18 November 1999 (age 26); Reykjavík, Iceland
- Genres: Emo rap; R'n'B; trap
- Years active: 2016–present
- Labels: Sony Music

Aron Can (Note: Pronounced [dʒan] in Turkish, or [kʰaːn] in Icelandic.) (born 18 November 1999) is an Icelandic hip hop artist.

== Biography ==
Aron was born and raised in Grafarvogur, Reykjavík. His father is a Turkish restaurateur and Aron has worked in one of his kebab restaurants.

In 2016, at the age of 16, he released the mixtape Þekkir stráginn, with the song "Enginn mórall" becoming a hit. He was the most popular local artist on Spotify in Iceland in 2017.

His style has been described as emo rap influenced by Drake, Future, and Young Thug, and he is credited with popularizing the style in Iceland.

In 2018, he signed with Sony Music.

== Albums ==
- 2016 – Þekkir stráginn.
- 2017 – Ínótt.
- 2018 – Trúpíter. Charted as the number one album in Iceland.
- 2021 – ANDI, LÍF, HJARTA, SÁL.

== Awards and nominations ==
Aron was nominated for the Icelandic Music Awards in 2017 for the hip hop album of the year, hip hop song of the year, and as a rising star. The song "Silfurskotta" by Emmsjé Gauti and Aron Can won as the hip hop song of the year. He was again nominated in 2018 for hip hop album of the year and hip hop song of the year.

The music video for "Aldrei heim" of Trúpiter was selected as the music video of the year 2019 by the Icelandic Radio Listener's Awards.

== Festivals ==
Aron performed at the Reykjavík music festival Secret Solstice in 2016–2019, in the last of which he performed with the Black Eyed Peas.

He performed at Þjóðhátíð in Vestmannaeyjar in 2017.
