= Just Another Snake Cult =

- Origin: Reykjavík, Iceland
- Genres: psychedelic pop, lo-fi
- Years active: 2010–present
- Labels: Brak Records, Off Tempo

Just Another Snake Cult is a lo-fi pop Icelandic troupe based out of Reykjavík, Iceland. It was formed in 2010 by multi-instrumentalist and bedroom-producer Þórir Bogason. They have developed a reputation of releasing limited-edition releases on a variety of formats. The project's debut full-length, The Dionysian Season, was released on CD by Brak Records (edition of 300). The follow-up, Ghosts, was released as digital download, and is no longer available. In 2012 they released an EP on cassette, Birds Carried Your Song (edition of 100), with hand-screened covers. Their latest release is entitled Cupid Makes a Fool of Me. It was awarded a Kraumur award and widely recognized as one of the best Icelandic albums of 2013. It was released in Europe in 2014 by Projekta Music.

They have performed domestically and internationally at festivals in Iceland, Europe and in the US.

== Discography ==
- The Dionysian Season (2010)
- Ghosts (2011)
- Birds Carried Your Song Through the Night (2012)
- Lost in the Dark (2012)
- Cupid Makes a Fool of Me (2013)
- Cupid Makes a Fool of Me [European release] (2014)
