= Þorfinnur Ómarsson =

Icelandic media personality (born 1965)

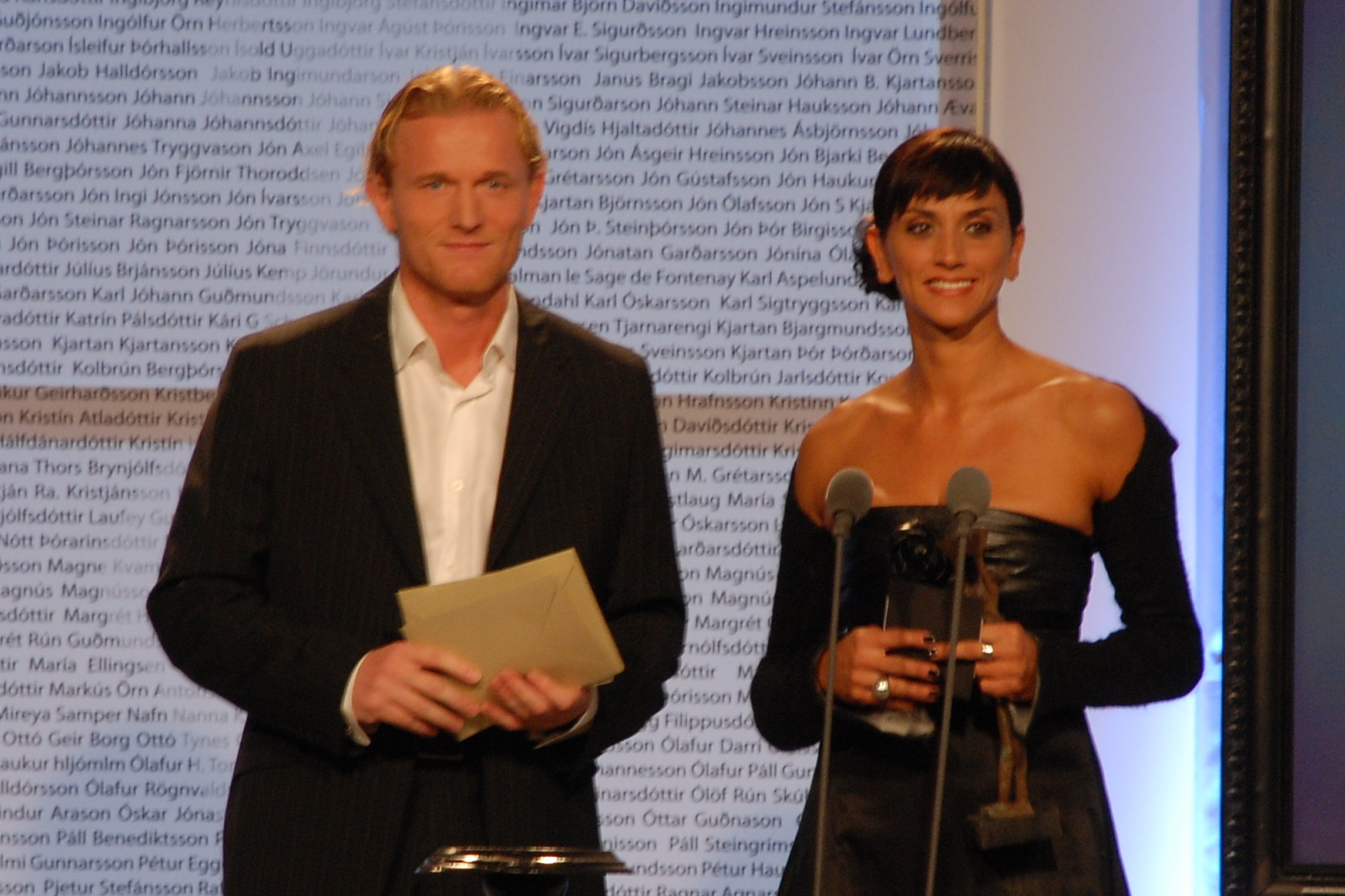
Thorfinnur Omarsson (left) at the 2007 Edda Awards

Þorfinnur Ómarsson (born 25 October 1965) is an Icelandic media personality and film and TV producer.

Thorfinnur was the managing director of the Icelandic Film Fund and the Icelandic Film Centre from 1996 to 2003. Thorfinnur was one of the founders of the Icelandic Film and TV Academy, which runs the Icelandic Edda Awards. He was the live-broadcast host of the first ceremony in 1999. From 2003 to 2005 he was the Director of Media and Communication Studies at the University of Iceland, and was then hired by Dagur Group to head its production arm, BaseCamp. He has been host of Ísland í dag (Iceland today) on Stöð 2 (Icelandic Channel 2) and of Vikulokin (The End of the Week) on Rás 1. He is a member of the European Film Academy.

Thorfinnur was the Chief Spokesperson for the Sri Lanka Monitoring Mission in 2006 and 2007, and spokesperson for the Icelandic Ministry of Economics and Commerce from October 2008 to April 2009. In spring 2010 he became editor of Eyjan.

In 2016, Thorfinnur started his work as a Senior Officer and Head of Information and Communications at the EFTA Secretariat, in Brussels. Since 2023, Thorfinnur has been part of the communication staff at the OECD in Paris.

== Personal life ==
Omarsson was educated in France, where he also worked as a correspondent. He is a son of Ómar Ragnarsson. Thorfinnur lives with Astrós Gunnarsdóttir, a theatre director, choreographer, dancer and Pilates instructor. He is also an award-winning chef.
