= Mono Town =

Icelandic musical band

- Origin: Reykjavík, Iceland
- Years active: 2012-present
- Labels: INNI
- Members: Bjarki Sigurðsson; Börkur Hrafn Birgisson; Daði Birgisson

Mono Town is an Icelandic musical band from Reykjavík with alternative pop and ambient influences formed in 2012 by brothers Börkur and Daði Birgisson (earlier from the Icelandic funk band Jagúar) and singer/guitarist Bjarki Sigurðsson on lead vocals.

Their debut album of 11 tracks in English language was In The Eye Of The Storm. It was recorded in Iceland, mixed by the Grammy Award winning mixer, Michael Brauer and has been a big success in Iceland upon release on 27 January 2014 by Key Music Management. In The Eye Of The Storm, won the Icelandic Music Awards in 2015 for album of the year and song of the year, "Peacemaker". A limited vinyl edition was also released. The initial single release "Peacemaker" has also charted in Iceland. In 2013, Deezer had announced that it was sponsoring the Icelandic band for an international launch. Mono Town performed at the inaugural All Tomorrow's Parties in Iceland and gained further international attention through being featured on the influential avant-garde American radio station KEXP.

Their sophomore album "Time, Vol. I" of 9 tracks was released on September 28, 2021, onto streaming services with no prior announcement. The same year the band won the Icelandic Music Awards for songwriters of the year and album of the year(pop, rock and electronica).

In 2024, Mono Town created additional music to director Simon West upcoming film, Old Guy. Starring Christoph Waltz, Lucy Liu and Cooper Hoffman.

== Members ==
- Bjarki Sigurðsson - guitar, lead vocals
- Börkur Hrafn Birgisson - bass, multi-instrumentalist
- Daði Birgisson - keyboards, multi-instrumentalist

== Discography ==
=== Albums ===
- 2014: In the Eye of the Storm
- 2021: Time, Vol. 1

=== Singles ===
- 2013: "Jackie O"
- 2013: "Peacemaker"
- 2014: "Yesterday's Feeling"
