= 200.000 naglbítar =

Icelandic rock band

200.000 Naglbítar
- Origin: Akureyri, Iceland
- Years active: 1993–present
- Labels: Sproti, Dennis
- Members: Vilhelm Anton Jónsson; Kári Jónsson; Benedikt Brynleifsson
- Past members: Axel Árnasson

200.000 naglbítar is an Icelandic rock band. In 2003, their song "Láttu mig vera" was the most played Icelandic song on the radio station Rás 2.

In 1995 they participated in the music competition Músíktilraunir and ended up in third place. Vilhelm Anton, the singer of the band was chosen as the best singer of the competition.

In 1998 the band published their first album, Neóndýrin which Morgunblaðið reviewed as a promising start for the band.

In 2000 the album Vögguvísur fyrir skuggaprins was published which Morgunblaðið reviewed as an improvement over their past album and the band still had not reached their full potential.

In 2003 the album Hjartagull was published. At the 2003 Icelandic music awards it was nominated as the best pop album, and the song "láttu mig vera" was nominated as the best pop song.

The band participated at the 2003 Iceland Airwaves.

== Discography ==
- Neóndýrin (1998)
- Vögguvísur fyrir skuggaprins (2000)
- Hjartagull (2003)
