= Ómar Ragnarsson =

Icelandic journalist (born 1940)

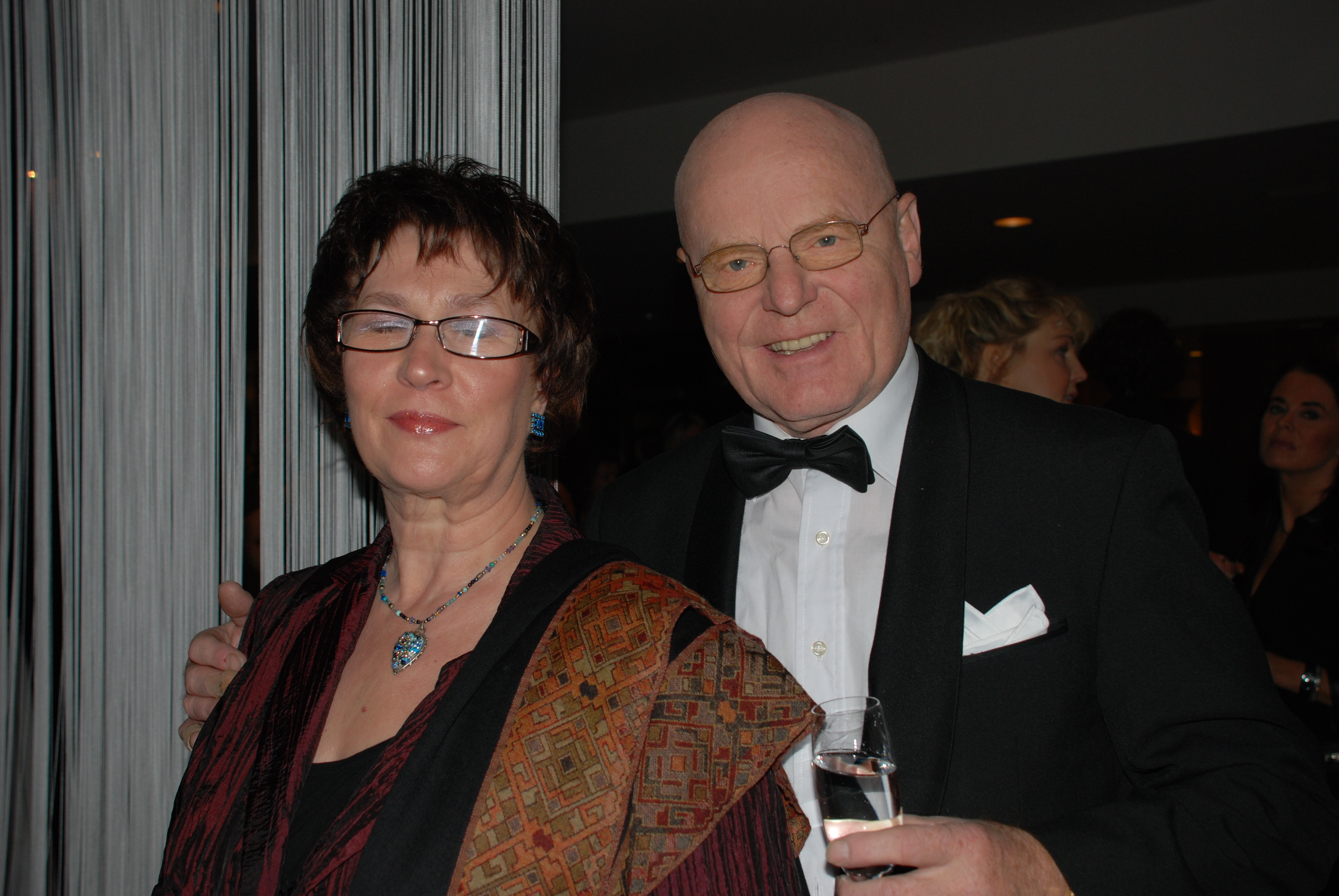
- Ómar Ragnarsson at the Edda Awards 2007.
- Born: Ómar Þorfinnur Ragnarsson; September 16, 1940 (age 85); Reykjavík, Kingdom of Iceland
- Occupations: News reporter, entertainer, rally driver
- Years active: 1952-present
- Known for: Sumargleðin
- Spouse: Helga Jóhannsdóttir
- Children: 7, including Þorfinnur Ómarsson and Lára Ómarsdóttir

Ómar Þorfinnur Ragnarsson (born 16 September 1940) is an Icelandic environmental activist and former entertainer, news reporter and rally driver.

Born in Reykjavík, Ómar began acting on stage at the age of 12 and started his career as a stand-up comedian when he was 18. He has written a considerable number of songs and lyrics, performed by him or other Icelandic pop artists. Ómar studied law and has been a professional aviator and pilot since 1967. He worked as a TV reporter for RUV Channel 1 from 1969–1988, for TV Channel 2 from 1988–1995, and again for RUV from 1995. Later he started his own film production, mainly on nature and environmental issues in Iceland, Norway and the USA. He has also written 10 books in Iceland.

Ómar Ragnarsson turned activist for Icelandic nature and in September 2006, he led a protest walk against the controversial Kárahnjúkar Hydropower Plant. This led to the foundation of the environmentalist party Iceland's Movement – Living Land which took part in the 2007 parliamentary elections, chaired by Ómar Ragnarsson.

== Recognition ==
Ómar was picked as man of the year in 2006 by Stöð 2 (Channel two) in Iceland and by Rás 2 (Radio two, government-run radio station) in 2003 and 2006, for his fight for Icelandic nature. He also received 4 Edda-Awards from 2003 to 2006. On his 70th birthday, the Icelandic Government declared September 16 as "Icelandic Nature Day", in honour of Ómar Ragnarsson.

== Sports ==
Ómar played football for Ármann in 1970. He competed in rally-driving from 1975 to 1985, together with his brother Jón Ragnarsson, where he won 18 titles, including 4-times champions of Iceland, in 1980-1982 and 1984.

== Popular culture ==
In 2001, he was featured in the song Hí á þig with XXX Rottweilerhundar. In 2015, popular Icelandic rapper Emmsjé Gauti released a single titled "Ómar Ragnarsson". It is track #3 on his 2016 album, Vagg & Velta. The artist has said of the song, "The song is named after Ómar Ragnarsson because he’s always in a good mood like me."

== Personal life ==
With his wife Helga Jóhannsdóttir, Ómar is the father of seven, including media personalities Lára Ómarsdóttir and Þorfinnur Ómarsson.
