= Sumargleðin =

Icelandic musical group

- Origin: Reykjavík, Iceland
- Genres: Rock, Pop
- Years active: 1972–1986, 1994
- Label: Fálkinn
- Past members: Ragnar Bjarnason; Ómar Ragnarsson; Karl Guðmundsson; Bessi Bjarnason; Magnús Ólafsson; Þuríður Sigurðardóttir; Sigrún Hjálmtýsdóttir; Þórhallur Sigurðsson; Haraldur Sigurðsson; Hermann Gunnarsson; Þorgeir Ástvaldsson

Sumargleðin (English: The Summer Joy) were an Icelandic entertainment group that was active in the late 1970s and early 1980s. It was founded in 1972 by Ragnar Bjarnason and Ómar Ragnarsson. It produced several hit songs in Iceland, including Sumargleðin syngur, Ég fer í fríið, and Prins Póló.

== Discography ==
- Sumargleðin syngur (1981)
- Af einskærri sumargleði (1984)
