= Prince Polo =

Brand of chocolate bar from Poland

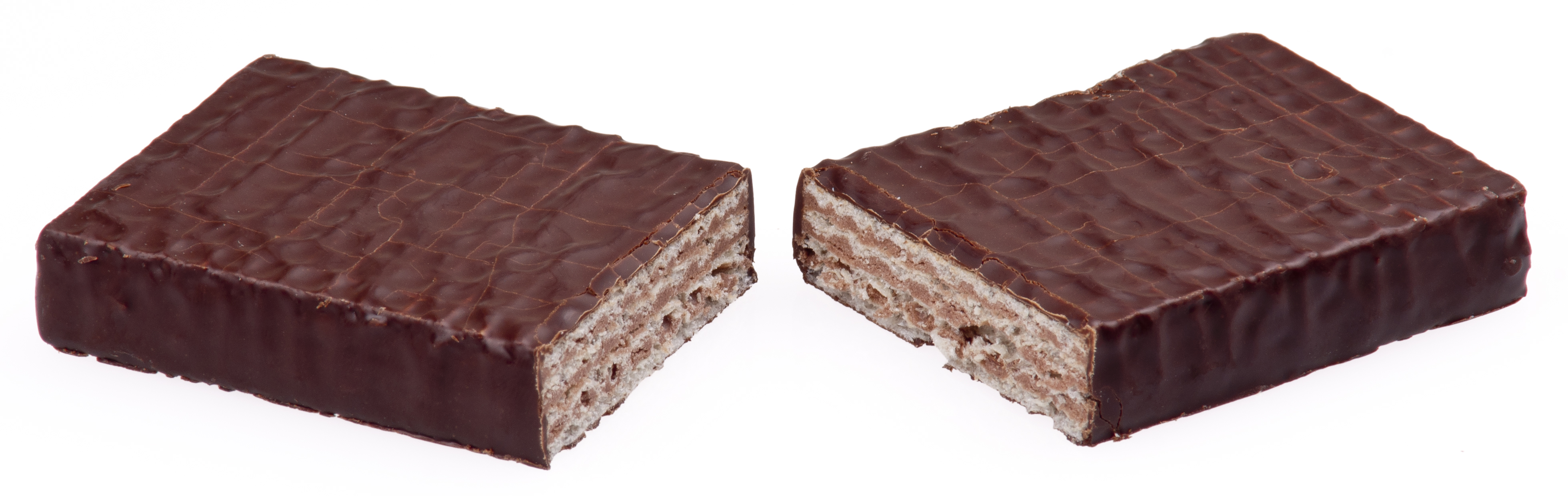
- A dark chocolate Prince Polo split
- Type: Chocolate bar
- Place of origin: Poland
- Created by: Olza S.A.
- Main ingredients: Wafer, chocolate

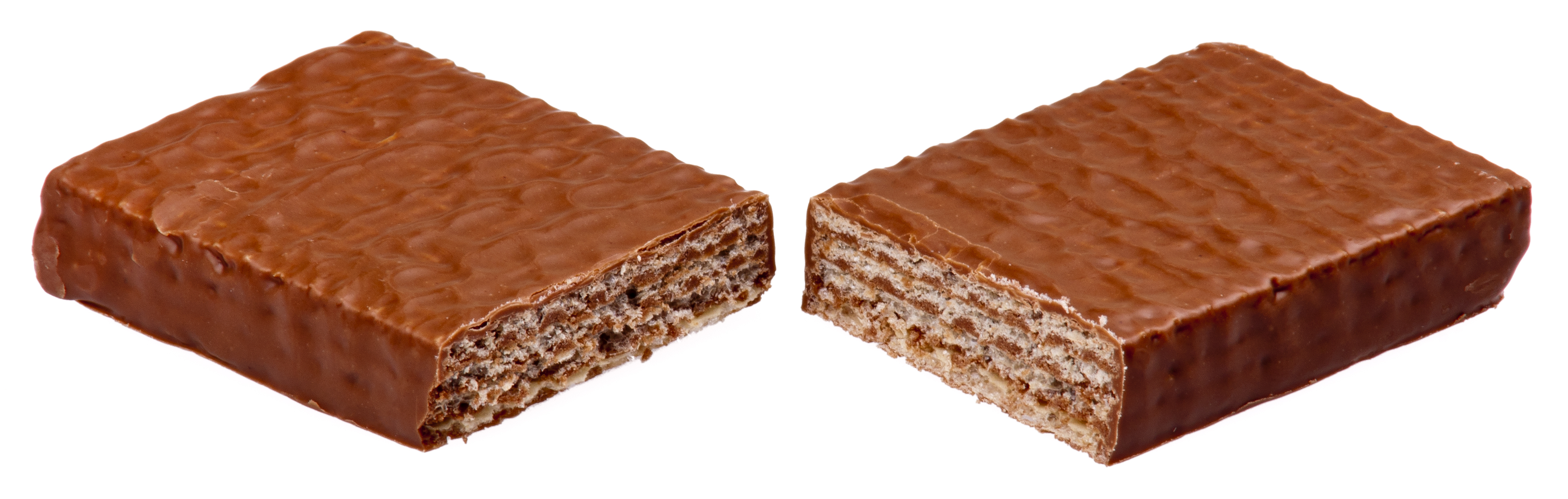
A milk chocolate and hazelnut Prince Polo split

Prince Polo is a Polish brand of chocolate wafer bars and one of Poland's top-selling confectionery products. It is also sold in the Czech Republic, Slovakia, Hungary, Lithuania, Latvia, Ukraine, Belarus, Russia and Kazakhstan under the name Siesta, and in Estonia, Indonesia, Greece, Romania, Moldova, Philippines, Bulgaria, Georgia, Iraq and Libya under name Ekstra-55 and in Iceland where it is often called Prins Póló. According to measurements shown by Nielsen, the bar has been the most sold chocolate bar for decades in Iceland and was for many years one of the few chocolate bars available in the country.

Prince Polo was introduced in 1955, during the early years of the Polish People's Republic, by Olza S.A. in Cieszyn. It is a chocolate-covered wafer, with four layers of wafer joined by three layers of chocolate-flavored filling; it was easily identifiable by its metallic gold-colored wrapper.

The company, which was founded in 1920, was purchased by Kraft Jacobs Suchard in 1993 (today Mondelez International). In 1995 the Prince Polo packaging was revised with a new logo; the bar was no longer wrapped in paper and was instead sealed in plastic. Subsequently, several new varieties of Prince Polo were introduced, beginning with Hazelnut (Orzechowy) in 1996, and later milk chocolate, coconut, and Premium (claimed to be a more luxurious version). A larger XXL (52 g) size was also added.

== In popular culture ==
- Prins Póló was an Icelandic indie-pop band/solo project/moniker of Svavar Pétur Eysteinsson, member of Icelandic alternative-rock band Skakkamanage.
- "Prins Póló" is an Icelandic song by Sumargleðin performed by Magnús Ólafsson, where he is nicknamed Prins Póló because of his love for the chocolate bar.

== See also ==
- Krówki, literally "little cows," are Polish fudge, semi-soft milk toffees.
- List of Polish desserts
