= Kári Egilsson =

Icelandic singer-songwriter, keyboardist

- Also known as: Kári
- Born: Kári Egilsson; March 14, 2002 (age 24)
- Origin: Iceland
- Genres: Pop, jazz
- Occupations: Songwriter, keyboard player, musician
- Instruments: Vocals, piano, keyboards, guitar
- Label: Alda Music

Kári Egilsson (born March 14, 2002) is an Icelandic recording artist, songwriter, singer and keyboard player. Kári works in different genres, pop music, jazz and he is also a trained classical musician.

== Music studies ==
Kári started studying piano when he was 7 years old. From classical music he branched into jazz piano and improvisation at the age of 10, studying with Eyþór Gunnarsson, keyboardist from the band Mezzoforte.

Kári graduated in both classical and jazz piano from the Reykjavík College of Music in 2022. Kári has also been a student of Berklee College of Music. In 2019 he was chosen to participate in The Berklee Global Jazz Institute at the Newport Jazz Festival under the tutelage of pianist Danilo Pérez.

== Musical career ==
Kári started writing music at an early age. Despite his formal training, he soon developed an interest in pop music. He started recording his first album, Palm Trees in the Snow, in 2021. Two singles from the album have been released but the album itself will come out in March 2023.

Kári is working on a second pop album with producer Albert Finnbogason. He has also recorded a jazz album called Óróapúls with his own compositions which will be released in 2023.

Kári is the recipient of ASCAP's Desmond Child Anthem award, given to young promising songwriters. At the award ceremony in 2018 he played his own composition for a full house in the Lincoln Center in New York.

Kári writes his songs on piano or guitar. He does all his arrangements himself, vocal harmonies, horns and strings. He has also composed music for two five part television documentary programs, Siglufjörður, story of a town in 2019 and Bæir byggjast in 2022.

== Personal life ==
Kári's parents are TV presenter Egill Helgason and Sigurveig Káradóttir, who is a chef. He was brought up in the center of the Reykjavík old town.

Because of his studies, Kári has been going back and forth between Iceland and the United States. But according to him, his favorite country is Greece where he has spent summers since he was a baby.

== Discography ==
- Something Better/Moonbeams, single October 28, 2022
- Sleepwalking/Untamed Horses, single January 27, 2023
- Palm Trees in the Snow, album March 10, 2023
