= Friðrik Dór =

Icelandic R&B and pop singer

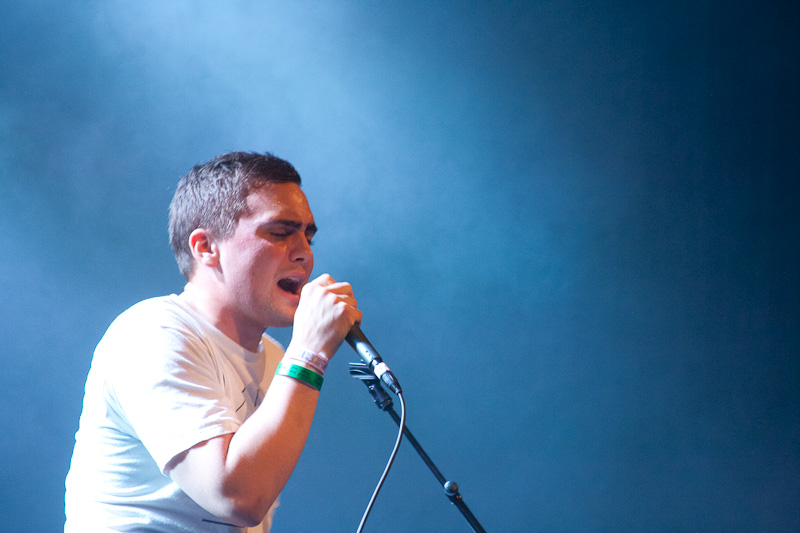
- Friðrik Dór at Iceland Airwaves in 2011

Background information
- Born: Friðrik Dór Jónsson; 7 October 1988 (age 38); Hafnarfjörður, Iceland
- Genres: Pop; R&B
- Occupations: Singer; songwriter
- Instruments: Vocals; drums; guitar
- Years active: 2009–present

Friðrik Dór Jónsson (born 7 October 1988) is an Icelandic R&B and pop singer-songwriter.

He began his career forming the band Fendrix with his schoolmates while in grade 8. He played drums in the band. The band took part in Músíktilraunir in 2003. He studied in Verzlunarskóli Íslands, a commerce college in Iceland, taking part in a number of musicals at the college.

His first solo record was in 2009, with the song "Hlið við hlið" that was played heavily on FM 957 reaching number 2 on the station's charts. He also landed a part in the film Bjarnfreðarson, released around Christmas 2009. His follow-up singles were "Á sama stað" in collaboration with the rapper Erpur Eyvindarson and "Fyrir hana" both in 2010.

In spring 2010, Friðrik Dór appeared in episode 5 of the comedy show Steindinn okkar on Stöð 2 Icelandic commercial channel where his character is robbed and murdered. The series producers used segments of Friðrik Dór's hit "Hlið við hlið" giving further boost and wide exposure.

Friðrik Dór was named "Rookie of the Year" FM 957 listeners poll held in June 2010. During the same month, he released the song "Keyrum'ettígang" with rappers Henrik Biering and Erpur Eyvindarson. Allt sem þú átt was his album in 2010 with 12 tracks on record including his earlier hits reaching Top 3 on tónlist.is chart.

In 2011, he appeared in an episode of Auddi og Sveppi on Stöð 2 and one of his song was used in promotional ads for the local brand of condoms. Retro Stefson rearranged the tune that premiered on 18 April 2011 adding to his popularity and sending him to the top of FM 957 chart. He also appeared as a guest on Independent People (Icelandic: Sjálfstætt fólk) on 17 April 2011 episode of the show. In 2015, he attempted to represent Iceland in the Eurovision Song Contest 2015 with the song "Í síðasta skipti", but came in second place. He later performed as a backing singer for the winner María Ólafsdóttir at the contest.

In 2021 he appeared on the comedy/mockumentary TV show "Hver Drap Friðrik Dór?" in Sjónvarp Símans. In the show he plays an "alternate reality" version of himself. His fourth album, Dætur, was released in 2022.

His brother is pop singer Jón Jónsson.

== Discography ==
=== Albums ===
- 2010: Allt sem þú átt
- 2012: Vélrænn
- 2018: Segir ekki neitt
- 2022: Dætur

=== Singles ===
- 2009: "Hlið við hlið"
- 2010: "Fyrir hana"
- 2011: "Leiðarlok"
- 2011: "Sjomleh" (with Auðunn Blöndal og Sveppi)
- 2012: "Gangnam Style (Cover)" (with Steindi Jr. og Sveppi Kull)
- 2014: "Alveg sama (Til í allt Pt. II)" (featuring Steindi Jr. & Bent)
- 2015: "Í síðasta skipti"
- 2016: "Dönsum (eins og hálfvitar)"
- 2016: "Fröken Reykjavík"
- 2017: "Hringd'í mig"
- 2018: "Fyrir fáeinum sumrum"
- 2018: "Á sama tíma, á sama stað / Heimaey" (with Jón Jónsson)

Featured in

- 2011: "Okkar leið" (Emmsjé Gauti feat. Friðrik Dór)
