= Gabríel (rapper) =

Icelandic rapper

Gabríel is an Icelandic rapper. He has made many collaborations for his debut album Gimsteinar that add a melodic effect to his rap. Contributing artist vocalists include Opee (from Quarashi and Original Melody), Valdimar Guðmundsson (of Valdimar, Unnstein Manuel Stefánsson (of Retro Stefson), Emmsjé Gauti, Björn Jörundur and Krummi. He has released debut album Gimsteinar resulting in 4 charting singles in Tónlist, the official Icelandic Chart. He insists on not revealing his real name to the media.

== Discography ==
=== Albums ===
- 2013: Gimsteinar

=== Singles ===
- 2012: "Stjörnuhröp" (feat. Opee & Valdimar Guðmundsson)
- 2012: "Sólskin" (feat. Opee & Unnstein Manuel Stefánsson)
- 2012: "Gleymmérei" (feat. Emmsjé Gauti & Björn Jörundur)
- 2013: "Gimsteinar" (feat. Krummi & Opee) (Tónlist ICE #10)
