= Daniel Rorke =

Australian musician

Daniel Rorke is a tenor and soprano saxophonist from Australia who now resides in Ireland. He grew up on Billen Cliffs commune outside of the town of Nimbin, in northern New South Wales.

Rorke holds a Bachelor of Jazz Studies with first class honour from the Sydney Conservatorium of Music, and a Master's degree in jazz performance from the Norwegian University of Science and Technology "Jazzlinja" in Trondheim. While in Sydney, he studied with American musicians Gordon Brisker and William Motzing, Australians Dale Barlow, Dave Panichi and Col Loughnan and New Zealand-born pianist Mike Nock. He also studied the history of contemporary composition with Richard Toop and shakuhachi with grand master Riley Lee. While in the United States, Rorke took private lessons with pianist Kenny Werner and saxophonist Jerry Bergonzi. Between 2002 and 2005, he lived in Reykjavík, Iceland, where he toured and recorded with a number of prominent Icelandic musicians and performed on the recording Dansaðu fíflið þitt, which featured the music of Icelandic bassist Thomas R. Einarsson and won Icelandic Jazz Recording of the Year in 2004. In 2008, Rorke moved to Trondheim, Norway, to undertake studies at Norwegian University of Science and Technology conservatory. While there, he studied with John Pål Inderberg and took composition lessons with Terje Bjørklund, Odd Johan Overøye and Henning Sommerro. He currently runs Satu, an independent record label for jazz and improvised music which has released two records so far: The Mismeasure of Man by Fear of Faces, and San'an by Daniel Rorke. In 2011, he toured Norway with the Australian pianist Alister Spence and his trio of Canadian bass player Joe Williamson and the Swedish percussionist Christopher Cantillo.
