= Arnbjörg Auður Örnólfsdóttir =

Icelandic singer (1935–2020)

- Born: 4 May 1935; Suðureyri, Iceland
- Died: 2 September 2020 (aged 85); Reykjavik, Iceland
- Occupation: Singer
- Years active: 1953–1976
- Spouse: Þórhallur Helgason
- Children: 2

Arnbjörg Auður Örnólfsdóttir (4 May 1935 – 2 September 2020) was an Icelandic singer. She was discovered at a singing contest held as part of a concert in mid-1953 and recorded almost 20 songs all released on records. Arnbjörg was a frequent performer and sang with the singer Aages Lorange and his instrumentalist as well as with the KK Sextet band at dances in the restaurants of Iceland.

== Early life ==
On 4 May 1935, Arnbjörg was born in Suðureyri close to the Súgandafjörður. She was the daughter of the ship owner Örnólfur Valdimarsson and the Suðureyrarkirkja organist and housewife Ragnhildur Þorvarðardóttir. At the age of ten, Arnbjörg and her family had relocated to Reykjavík.

== Career ==
She was discovered at a singing contest held as part of a concert conducted by Kristján Kristjánsson and his band, the KK Sextet in mid-1953. Arnbjörg was invited to perform at a midnight concert held by the sextet at the Austurbæjarbíó. She was praised by critics for her performance and predicted success for her. Prior to the conclusion of 1953, she performed on an album by Ólafur Briem accompanied by Ólafur Gaukur Þórhallsson's trio. In the following years, Arnbjörg performed frequently, staying with the singer Aages Lorange and his instrumentalist in Tjarnarkaffi for the longest amount of time in her career. She also performed with the KK Sextet at dances in the restaurants of Iceland.

Throughout the career of Arnbjörg, she recorded almost 20 songs, which were all released on records. She released two albums between late 1953 and 1954 and the only solo album of her career in 1955. Arnbjörg performed with Ólafur Briem, Björn R. Einarsson and the Smára Quartet on four albums released the following year. In 1959, she ceased singing publicly, although her songs were subsequently released on complication albums and were frequently broadcast on radio. Arnbjörg took a break from public signing to do some housework and parenting, but she did perform at private parties. She did however go onto an episode of the television series Úr einu í annað in 1976. She performed the song Bjarni og nikkan and it is the sole television recording of her that exists. Arnbjörg's life and career was told by Jónatan Garðarsson on the Rás 1 radio programme Seiðandi sangrödd in 2004.

== Personal life ==
She was married to Þórhallur Helgason, with whom she had three children. On 2 September 2020, Arnbjörg died at Landakotsspítali.
