= Kimono (band) =

Icelandic-Canadian math rock band

kimono
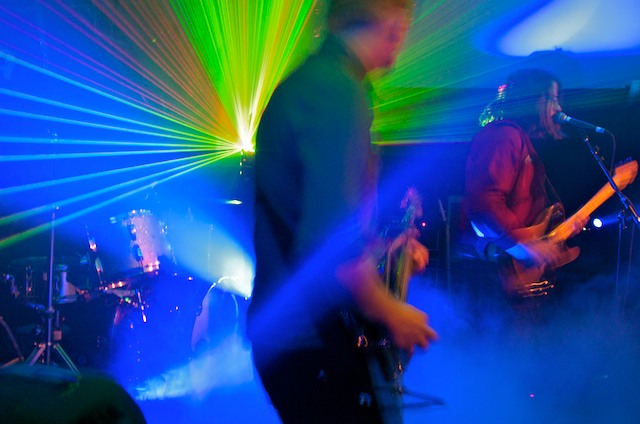
- Kimono at Sódóma, Reykjavík

Background information
- Origin: Reykjavík, Iceland
- Genres: Math rock; experimental rock
- Years active: 2001–present
- Labels: Bad Taste; Kimi Records
- Members: Alison MacNeil; Kjartan Bragi Bjarnason; Gylfi Blöndal
- Past members: Halldór Ragnarsson; Thráinn Óskarsson
- Website: kimono.is

kimono are an Icelandic-Canadian math rock band, formed in 2001. The group consists of Alison MacNeil (vocals, guitars, production), Gylfi Blöndal (bass, baritone guitar and guitar) and Kjartan Bragi Bjarnason (drums and percussion). Blöndal is also a member of Hudson Wayne and Mr. Silla and Bjarnason plays drums Seabear and has performed on a number of other Icelandic independent albums.

kimono's most recent studio album, Easy Music for Difficult People, was released by Kimi Records on 4 December 2009. The album topped many "Best of 2009" lists with journalists in Iceland.

In 2011, MacNeil came out as transgender after having been in treatment for gender dysphoria since late 2003.

== History ==
=== 2001–2003: Formation and "mineur-aggressif" ===
kimono formed in 2001 in Reykjavík, Iceland, after the breakup of a post-rock instrumental band called Kaktus. Alison, who is Canadian, had moved to Iceland in the winter of 1999 and joined the band after answering an advertisement posted in Hljómalind, a now-closed independent record store in downtown Reykjavík that was a popular hangout for local bands. Some of the members of Kaktus continued in kimono including guitarist Blöndal, drummer Thráinn Óskarsson and bassist Halldór Ragnarsson.

Óskarsson left the band in 2003 to concentrate on his other musical project, Hudson Wayne, and was replaced by Kjartan Bragi Bjarnason (also of Seabear). The band recorded their first record, mineur-aggressif, with Óskarsson playing drums, but mixed the album with Bjarnason. The recordings for the album were started in Studio Geimsteinn, the home studio of Icelandic bass player Rúnar Júliusson. The band then worked further on the record with Curver, an Icelandic record producer who has worked most recently with Ghostigital and with Björk on her Biophilia multimedia project. Curver was assisted in the recording of the album by Birgir Örn Steinarsson of the Icelandic rock band Maus who is also titled co-producer. Recordings were finished in Maus's practice space and mixed in Curver's Studio Rusl in downtown Reykjavík.

The album cover contains artwork by Hugleikur Dagsson, an Icelandic comic book artist. Each drawing in the album artwork corresponded to a song on the album. The album is being reissued by the band's own label, Terra Firma, in 2014.

mineur-aggressif was released by Bad Taste, an Icelandic independent record label owned by members of the Sugarcubes, which has been in operation since 1986. The album received positive reviews in the Icelandic press and the band was nominated for an Icelandic music award as Best Newcomer, but received little notice outside of Iceland.

=== 2004–2006: "Arctic Death Ship" and relocation to Berlin ===
MacNeil, Curver, and Steinarsson formed an artist collective called Tími ("time" in Icelandic) in 2004 and moved into the Klink & Bank artist studio complex and exhibition venue with their recording studio, where kimono started work on their second album "Arctic Death Ship". The first single off that record, Aftermath, drew comparisons to late 1970s art rock bands such as Television and the album was widely lauded in the Icelandic press with both of the largest national newspapers giving it a full 5 star review.

The band relocated for a year to Berlin to facilitate touring in support of Arctic Death Ship and were named one of the top bands to watch in 2006 by Intro magazine. kimono toured in Germany, Austria and Switzerland twice during their year living in Berlin. Ragnarsson left in 2007 to pursue his painting career and continued to play bass with Seabear.

=== 2007–2010: Personnel changes and "Easy Music for Difficult People" ===
Following their return from Berlin to Iceland, kimono auditioned several well-known Icelandic musicians to play bass guitar for the group including BAFTA-winning neo-classical composer, Ólafur Arnalds. Árni Hjörvar Arnason would join them for a brief period in 2007 before moving to London and joining The Vaccines. The band settled on continuing as a trio in 2008 and released Easy Music for Difficult People in December 2009 on Kimi Records, a small independent Icelandic record label that went bankrupt in early 2013.

=== 2011–2013: Gender transition and "Aquarium" ===
Both MacNeil and Blöndal were involved between the years of 2008 and 2013 in the Icelandic music start-up gogoyoko that operated an online fair trade music store. kimono was not very active during this period, although they played an improvised concert with Damo Suzuki of Can in October 2012 during that artist's visit to Iceland for the Reykjavík Film Festival.

In 2011, Alison MacNeil began transition to living full-time as a woman. Her story was covered in depth by an Icelandic English-language newspaper, The Reykjavík Grapevine in 2012 in an article by Rex Beckett. Beckett became the band's manager in October 2013.

The band released an instrumental, improvised record in August 2013 called "Aquarium", which was sold online only.

=== 2014–present: New album ===
In March 2014, kimono released their first single in over four years, called "Specters". The single was feature on the compilation "Made in Iceland VII". The band announced in June 2014 that an album would be released in late 2014 with Theory of Whatever Records.

== Discography ==
=== Albums ===
- mineur aggressif CD (Smekkleysa, 2003)
- Arctic Death Ship CD (Smekkleysa, 2005)
- curver + kimono CD (Tími, 2007)
- Easy Music for Difficult People CD (Kimi Records, 2009)

=== EPs ===
- kimono EP (self-released, 2002)

=== Compilations ===
- "Between Sets" on Alltaf sama svínið (Smekkleysa, 2002)
