= ADHD (band) =

Icelandic band

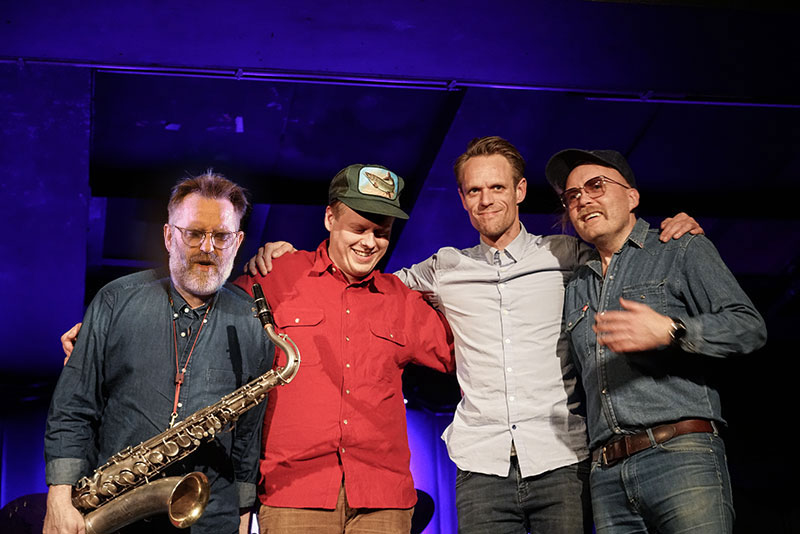
- ADHD performing in Odense (Denmark 2019); From left Óskar Guðjónsson (s), Tóms Jónsson (k), Jeppe Gram (d) and Ómar Guðjónsson (g/b); The regular drummer Magnús was ill on this occasion

Background information
- Genres: jazz, rock
- Years active: 2007–present
- Labels: Contemplate Music, Enja Records

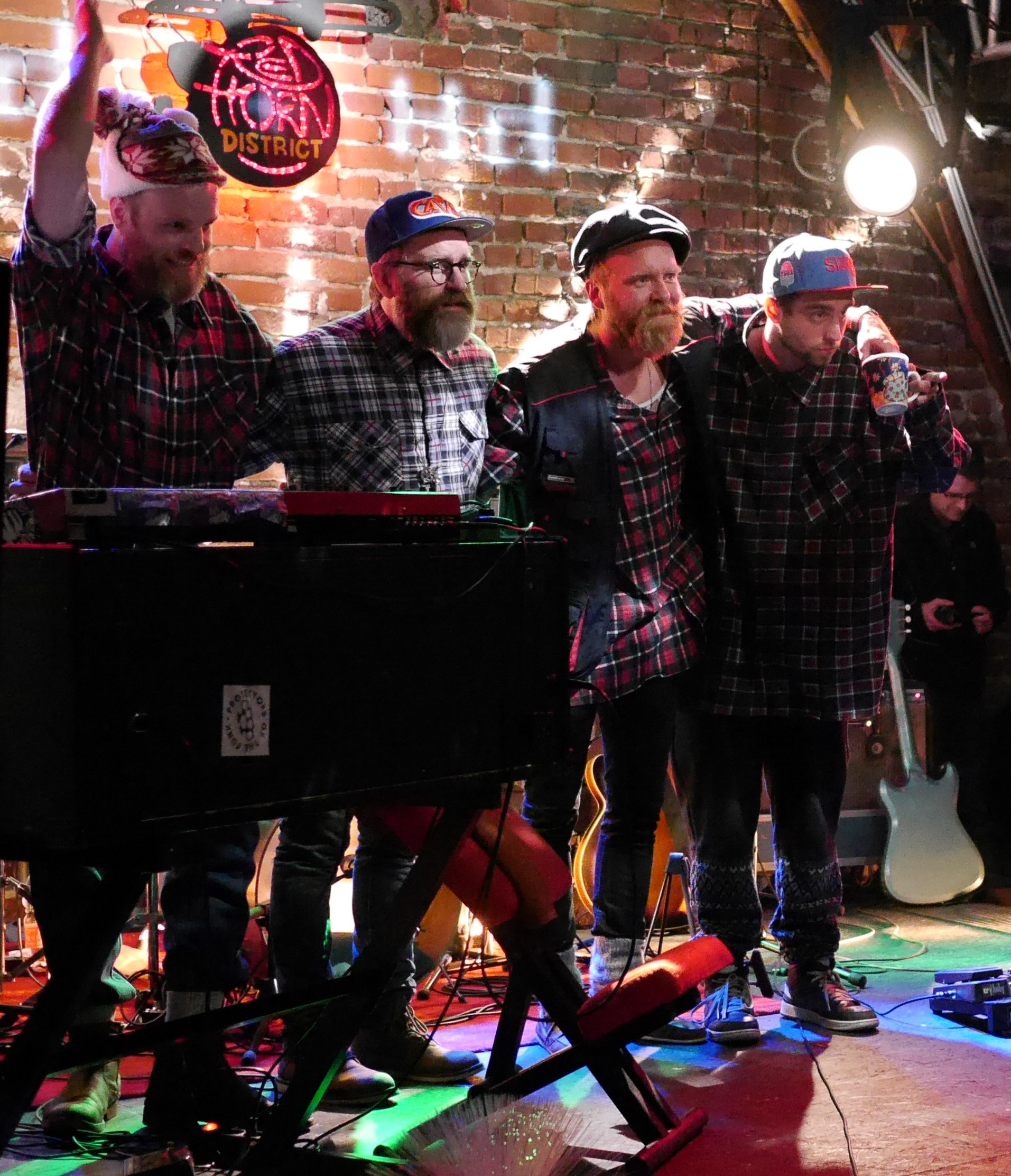
ADHD performing at the Red Horn District 2015

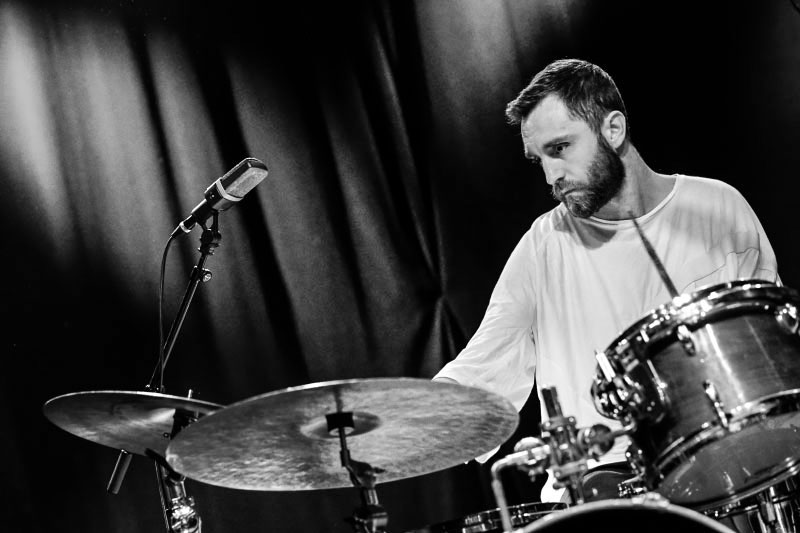
Magnús Trygvason Eliassen performing with ADHD (Aarhus, Denmark 2019)

ADHD is an Icelandic band formed in 2007 known for their instrumental music, influenced by jazz and rock. Its manager is Jom Lofty.

== Formation ==
The band was formed to perform at the Höfn í Hornafirði blues-festival in 2007 and as the collaboration was successful the band decided to keep on performing. Their first album, ADHD was recorded and published in 2009 and won the title Icelandic Jazz Album of the Year at the Icelandic Music Awards. The albums ADHD2, ADHD3 and ADHD4 all have received nominations for the Nordic music prize.

ADHD's albums are recorded live, to reflect the live performances of the band.

== Members ==
- Óskar Guðjónsson - Saxophones
- Ómar Guðjónsson - Guitars and bass guitar
- Davíð Þór Jónsson - Hammond organ, Moogs, Rhodes piano, piano, bass
- Magnús Trygvason Eliassen - Drums

== Discography ==
=== Albums ===
- 2009: ADHD
- 2011: ADHD 2
- 2012: ADHD 3
- 2012: ADHD 4
- 2014: ADHD 5
- 2017: ADHD 6
- 2019: ADHD 7
- 2022: ADHD 8
- 2024: ADHD 9
