= Kjuregej =

Icelandic painter, actress, musician, and stage and costume designer

Alexandra Kjuregej Argunova, better known by her folk singer name, Kjuregej (born 12 December 1938), is a painter, actress, musician, and stage and costume designer. She is from the Sakha Republic and was born in Siberia, but has lived and worked in Iceland for several decades.

Alexandra Argunova was born in Yakutia; after her father died in World War II, and her mother also died not long after, she and her brother were placed in a boarding school. In 1961–66, she studied theatre in Moscow at GITIS, now the Russian Academy of Theatre Arts, earning a B.A. In 1993–94 she studied at the oldest academy of art in Spain, Escola Massana de Barcelona, earning a diploma. In 1966, she emigrated to Iceland and the same year married Magnús Jónsson, an artist; they had studied together in Moscow.

Since 1970 she has, among other activities, worked in theatres in Iceland and Denmark, worked as a costumer and designer, acted in and directed amateur theatre, taught children and adolescents, worked as an art therapist at a psychiatric hospital and emerged as the folk singer Kjuregej (Yakut for "lark", her nickname since childhood). In 2011 she released a CD titled Lævirkinn (The Lark), with thirteen songs recorded in 2009–11 plus three recorded in 1972 by Icelandic National Broadcasting, in which she performed with guitarist Gunnar H. Jónsson. Most she sings in Yakut, some in Russian and some in Icelandic. The recording received a special jury recognition award at the 2012 Icelandic Music Awards. In 2013, she returned to Russia to perform with Icelandic musicians.

She has also held many exhibitions of her artwork in recent years, including at the Ásmundasal (1988), La Cultural Matadepera gallery in Spain (1994), Bjutejdjak gallery in Russia (1999), MÍR and the headquarters of the Association of Icelandic Artists (both 2004), the Fljótdalshérað Cultural Foundation list án landamæra (Art Without Borders; 2010), and Reykjavík Town Hall (2011), and appeared in numerous group shows including two outside Iceland, at the Moscow International House (Friends of the Earth Olokho, 2007) and the National Museum of Sakha-Yakutia, Russia (Ísland-Yakutia, 2009). In an exhibition review in Morgunblaðið in 2004, Ragna Sigurðardóttir especially praised her figurative works, and "not least those influenced by her origins" and called the "power, contentment, and joy" that went into their creation inspirational. Works by her are to be found in many public places, such as her sculpture Hjálpaðu mér að fljúga (Help Me to Fly) in the grounds of the Paediatric and Adolescent Medicine Section of the Landspítali hospital in Reykjavík.

Seeking to build closer ties between Sakha and Iceland, Kjuregej opened a Yakut house and culture centre in Iceland in the late 2000s.

Súsana Svavarsdóttir wrote a biography of Kjuregej, published in 2000, titled Hættuleg kona (Dangerous Woman). Her relationship with her husband was the subject of a 2008 documentary by Yuri Salnikov, Магнус и Кюрегей (Magnus and Kjuregej).
