= Stefán Karl Stefánsson =

Icelandic actor and singer (1975–2018)

- Stefán Karl in 2009
- Born: 10 July 1975; Hafnarfjörður, Iceland
- Died: 21 August 2018 (aged 43); Iceland
- Education: Iceland Academy of the Arts
- Occupations: Actor; singer
- Years active: 1994–2018
- Spouse: Steinunn Ólína Þorsteinsdóttir (m. 2002)
- Children: 4
- Relatives: Magnús Ólafsson (uncle); Hörður Magnússon (cousin)

Stefán Karl Stefánsson (/ˈstɛfən ˈstɛfənsən/ STEF-ən STEF-ən-sən, Icelandic: [ˈstɛːfaun ˈkʰartl̥ ˈstɛːfaunsɔn]; 10 July 1975 – 21 August 2018) was an Icelandic actor and singer. He was best known for portraying Robbie Rotten, the antagonist of the children's television series LazyTown.

== Career ==
Stefán Karl's career started in 1994 at the age of 19, when he worked as a puppeteer for television. During his years as a puppeteer, he had also been studying at the Drama Academy of Iceland. However, he was unsatisfied with the perspectives of Icelandic drama standards. He recalled that his principal at his high school said that "acting is not about making faces and changing your face", which he disagreed with.

Later, Stefán Karl was invited by Magnús Scheving, an Icelandic gymnast, to portray one of the characters in the second LazyTown play. Magnús created the plays due to his concerns about Iceland's younger generation lacking sufficient physical exercise. Stefán Karl explained that "[Magnús] wanted the kids to get healthier, so he created this musical called LazyTown. He played Sportacus, the fitness fanatic, and I was Robbie Rotten, the guy who liked to stay indoors and sleep". After initial success with the musical, Nickelodeon eventually made a deal with the creators of LazyTown to air the first 40 episodes of LazyTown along with a special studio built in Iceland. During the first few years of LazyTown in the early 2000s, Stefán Karl initially knew no English, but he soon became fluent.

== Personal life ==
Stefán Karl had attention deficit hyperactivity disorder, Tourette syndrome, obsessive–compulsive disorder and dyslexia. He lived in Los Angeles with wife Steinunn Ólína Þorsteinsdóttir, three daughters, and one son. In June 2018, he was awarded the Order of the Falcon. Stefán Karl was the nephew of actor and comedian Magnús Ólafsson and cousin of former footballer Hörður Magnússon.

== Illness and death ==
Stefán Karl announced in October 2016 that he had been diagnosed with bile duct cancer. A GoFundMe campaign was subsequently created by LazyTown head writer Mark Valenti to cover his living costs when he became too ill to work. The campaign was popularized by various YouTube users uploading parodies of Stefán Karl's work, and linking to the GoFundMe page, which led to the songs "We Are Number One" and "The Mine Song" from LazyTown becoming Internet memes. In August 2017, Stefán Karl stated he was in remission. He clarified on his GoFundMe campaign that while his metastases had been removed after successful liver surgery in June 2017, he still had the disease and had refused further adjuvant therapy.

In March 2018, Stefán Karl's cancer was diagnosed as inoperable. He said that he was undergoing chemotherapy to prolong his life. In April 2018, he announced that he had chosen to discontinue chemotherapy, and proceeded to shut down all his social media accounts.

Stefán Karl died on 21 August 2018 at the age of 43. His wife stated, "Per Stefan's wishes, there will be no funeral. His earthly remains will be scattered in secrecy in a distant ocean."

== Legacy ==
His manager, Cheryl Edison, announced that the Stefán Karl Academy & Center for the Performing Arts would be launched in Switzerland in 2019 as a memorial to his career. Several internet petitions have been started calling for a statue of Stefán Karl to be erected in his home town of Hafnarfjörður. As of June 2022, it has received over 528,000 signatures.

In 2002, he founded the non-profit anti-bullying organization Regnbogabörn (Rainbow Children), which was shut down in 2014.

== Filmography ==
Stefán Karl has been credited in various works including plays, television series, films, and games.

=== Theatre ===
| Year | Title | Role | Notes |
|---|---|---|---|
| 1997–1999 | The Jungle Book by Rudyard Kipling | | |
| 1998–1999 | Palace of Crows by Einar Örn Gunnarsson | | |
| 1998–1999 | Ivanov by Anton Chekhov | | |
| 1999–2000 | 1000 Island Dressing by Hallgrímur Helgason | | |
| 1999–2000 | Little Shop of Horrors | Orin Scrivello, D.D.S. | |
| 1999–2000 | A Midsummer Night's Dream | | |
| 1999–2000 | Glanni Glæpur í Latabæ by Magnús Scheving and Sigurdur Sigurjónsson | Glanni Glæpur (Robbie Rotten) | Primary antagonist |
| 2000–2001 | Stones in His Pockets by Marie Jones | | |
| 2000–2001 | Singin' in the Rain by Comden, Green, Freed and Brown | Cosmo Brown | |
| 2000–2002 | The Cherry Orchard by Anton Chekhov | | |
| 2001–2002 | Cyrano de Bergerac by Edmond Rostand | | |
| 2002–2003 | Noises Off by Michael Frayn | | |
| 2002–2003 | Life x 3 by Yasmina Reza | | |
| 2008–2015 | Dr. Seuss' How the Grinch Stole Christmas! The Musical | The Grinch | Baltimore and Boston (2008); Los Angeles (2009); North American tour (2010–14); Worcester, Massachusetts and Appleton, Wisconsin (2015) |

=== Films ===
| Year | Title | Role | Notes |
|---|---|---|---|
| 1994 | Áramótaskaup | New Reporter, many others | Debut film TV film |
| 1995 | Privacy | Student | First feature film |
| 1999 | Skaupið: 1999 | Robbie Williams, many others | TV film |
| 2001 | Regina | Manni – Police Officer | |
| 2001 | Áramótaskaup | | TV film |
| 2002 | Stella for Office | Ingimundur | |
| 2002 | Litla lirfan ljóta | The Worm | |
| 2002 | Áramótaskaup | Many roles | TV film |
| 2006 | Night at the Museum | | Miscellaneous crew |
| 2007 | Anna and the Moods | | Voiceover |
| 2009 | Jóhannes | Diddi | |
| 2011 | Thor | | Miscellaneous crew |
| 2011 | Polite People | Lárus Skjaldarson | Lead actor |
| 2014 | Harry Og Heimir | Símon | |

=== Television ===
| Year | Title | Role | Notes |
|---|---|---|---|
| 1998 | Baking Trouble | | Channel 1 program |
| 1999 | God Exists... And Love | | Channel 1 Drama Academy of Iceland |
| 2000 | Angel No. 5503288 | | Channel 1 program |
| 2000 | Car Mechanic Sketches for Eurovision | | Channel 1 program |
| 2000 | Cars Can Fly | | Channel 1 program |
| 2004–2007, 2013–2014 | LazyTown | Robbie Rotten | Main villain |
| 2015 | Titch and Ted Do Maths | | |

=== Video games ===
| Year | Title | Role | Notes |
|---|---|---|---|
| 2017 | For Honor | Viking Soldier | Final role |
