= Stafrænn Hákon =

Icelandic post-rock musician

- Origin: Reykjavík, Iceland
- Genres: Post-rock, ambient, indie rock, dream pop, indietronica, electronic
- Years active: 1999–present
- Labels: Darla, Happy Prince, Kimi, Stereo Dasein, Resonant, Nature Bliss, Secret Eye, Vogor, Sound in Silence
- Members: Ólafur Josephsson; Árni Þór Árnason; Lárus Sigurðsson; Magnús Freyr Gíslason; Róbert Már Runólfsson
- Past members: Samúel White; Sturla Már Finnbogason
- Website: shakon.com

Stafrænn Hákon (Icelandic pronunciation: [ˈstavraitn̥ ˈhauːkɔn], Digital Hákon) is the stage name used by Icelandic musician Ólafur Josephsson. Ólafur has been making music at his home studio since 1999. Stafrænn has self released 3 albums in Iceland. Later 2 of the albums were re-released on Resonant in the UK and the debut on Secret Eye in the U.S. Stafrænn also released his 4th record on Resonant in 2004. The album "Gummi" was released in June 2007, on Resonant and Nature Bliss. in 2010 Stafrænn's 6th full-length album "Sanitas" was released on Darla Records (US&EU),Happy Prince (ASIA) and Kimi Records in Iceland. Sanitas was well received and did find Stafrænn Hákon experimenting more with pop elements.

== Discography ==
=== Studio albums ===
- Eignast Jeppa (2001) (Secret Eye US)
- Í ástandi rjúpunnar (2002) (Resonant UK)
- Skvettir edik á ref (2003) (Resonant UK)
- Ventill / Poki (2004) (Resonant UK)
- Gummi (2007) (Resonant UK / Nature Bliss ASIA)
- Sanitas (2010) (Darla Records / Happy Prince)
- Prammi (2012) (Sound in Silence)
- Kælir Varðhund (cassette/digital) (2014) (Stereo Dasein)
- Eternal Horse (2015) (Darla Records)
- Hausi (2017) (Vogor Records)
- Aftur (2019) (Vogor Records / Darla Records)

=== EPs ===
- 7" Split on Awkward Silence W/ Emery Reel (2004)
- Tour EP W/ Dialect (2004) (Resonant UK)
- Glussi Christmas 7" (2004) (Resonant UK)
- Sprengir Ílát EP (2006) (Chat Blanc Canada)
- Kobbi EP (limited Tour EP) (2007) (Vogor Recordings)
- Exchange: 2 Collaboration with Void's Anatomy (2009) (Chat Blanc Canada)
- Apron EP (limited EU Tour EP) (2010) (Vogor Recordings)
- Glussajól (limited collection of Christmas songs) (2010) (Brak)
