= We Built a Fire =

Studio album by Seabear
- Released: 5 March 2010
- Genre: Indie folk, indie pop, baroque pop
- Length: 46:00
- Label: Morr Music
- Producer: Seabear

Seabear chronology
| The Ghost That Carried Us Away (2007) | We Built a Fire (2010) | While the Fire Dies EP (2010) |

We Built a Fire is the second full-length album from Icelandic band Seabear.

== Track listing ==
We Built a Fire track listing
| No. | Title | Length |
|---|---|---|
| 1. | "Lion Face Boy" | 3:36 |
| 2. | "Fire Dies Down" | 4:34 |
| 3. | "I'll Build You a Fire" | 3:37 |
| 4. | "Cold Summer" | 5:36 |
| 5. | "Wooden Teeth" | 2:42 |
| 6. | "Leafmask" | 3:12 |
| 7. | "Softship" | 4:14 |
| 8. | "We Fell Off the Roof" | 5:28 |
| 9. | "Warm Blood" | 5:05 |
| 10. | "In Winter's Eyes" | 3:52 |
| 11. | "Wolfboy" | 4:25 |
| Total length: | | 47:13 |

Limited edition bonus CD (While the Fires Dies EP)
| No. | Title | Length |
|---|---|---|
| 1. | "Pocket Knife" | 2:39 |
| 2. | "Arms" | 2:36 |
| 3. | "Bright House" | 3:11 |
| 4. | "Singing Arc" | 2:30 |
| 5. | "Leafmask II" | 0:53 |
| 6. | "Doctor" | 2:05 |
| Total length: | | 14:03 |
