= Icelandic Music Awards =

Annual music award ceremony

- Íslensku tónlistarverðlaunin
- Country: Iceland
- Presented by: Samtónn (Icelandic Music Association)
- First award: 1993; 33 years ago
- Website: iston.is

The Icelandic Music Awards (Icelandic: Íslensku tónlistarverðlaunin) are the official annual music awards given in Iceland to commemorate the musical achievements of the year.

The award was established in 1993 with an annual rock award given by the Félag íslenskra hljómlistarmanna (FÍH) (Union of Icelandic Musicians); since then, it has developed into a multi-category event held usually in January or February for awards of the previous year.

Since 2002, the event has been sponsored by the Icelandic Music Association known as Samtónn.

== Winners ==
=== 1993 ===
Winners:

- Song of the Year: "Stúlkan" by Todmobile
- Album of the Year: Spillt by Todmobile
- Performer / Band of the Year: Todmobile
- Singer of the Year (male): Daníel Ágúst Haraldsson
- Singer of the Year (female): Björk Guðmundsdóttir
- Keyboard Player of the Year: Eyþór Gunnarsson
- Bass Player of the Year: Eiður Arnarsson
- Drummer of the Year: Gunnlaugur Briem
- Guitar Player of the Year: Guðmundur Pétursson
- Instrumentalist of the Year (other instruments): Sigtryggur Baldursson (percussion)
- Songwriter of the Year: Þorvaldur Bjarni Þorvaldsson
- Lyricist of the Year: Andrea Gylfadóttir
- Cover of the Year: "Starlight" by Jet Black Joe
- Best Newcomer: Orri Harðarson
- Honorary: Björgvin Halldórsson

=== 2004 ===
Winners:

- Record of the Year: Mugimama, is this monkey music? by Mugison
- Music video of the Year: "Oceania" by Björk
- Best Export: Bang Gang and Barði Jóhannsson
- Honorary: Helga Ingólfsdóttir (harpsichord)
- Motivational recording: Ágúst Einarsson for the book Hagræn áhrif tónlistar
- Rock and pop:
  - Best Pop Album: Mugimama, Is This Mugimusic? by Mugison
  - Best Rock Album: Hljóðlega af stað by Hjálmar
  - Best Album: Vetrarljóð by Ragnheiður Gröndal
  - Singer of the Year (male): Páll Rósinkranz
  - Singer of the Year (female): Ragnheiður Gröndal
  - Performer / Band of the Year: Jagúar
  - Song of the Year: "Murr Murr" by Mugison
  - Best Newcomer: Hjálmar
- Classical and contemporary:
  - Composition of the Year: Sinfónía by Þórð Magnússon
  - Record of the Year: Verk fyrir selló og píanó - Bryndís Halla Gylfadóttir (cellist) and Edda Erlendsdóttir (piano) and Enescu, Janacek, Kodaly, Martinu
  - Performer of the Year: Bryndís Halla Gylfadóttir (cellist)
  - Newcomer: Víkingur Ólafsson (piano)
- Jazz:
  - Record of the Year: Dansaðu fíflið þitt dansaðu! by Sammi, Tómas R and Jagúar
  - Composition of the Year: Ástin by Tómas R. Einarsson (Dansaðu fíflið þitt dansaðu)
  - Jazz Artist of the Year: Samúel Jón Samúelsson and Jagúar

=== 2006 ===
Winners:

- Music video of the Year: "The One" by Trabant
- Best album art: Please Don't Hate Me by Lay Low
- Best Newcomer: Elfa Rún Kristinsdóttir
- Útrásarverðlaun Reykjavíkur Loftbrú: Ghostigital
- Motivational: FL Group
- Honorary: Ólafur Gaukur Þórhallsson
- Most Popular Song of the Year: "Barfly" by Jeff Who?
- Popular Performer of the Year: Lay Low
- Classical and Contemporary:
  - Record of the Year: Þorlákstíðir by Voces Thules
  - Performer of the Year: Víkingur Ólafsson (piano)
  - Composition of the Year: "Fiðlukonsert" by Áskell Másson
- Jazz:
  - Record of the Year: Atlantshaf by Atlantshaf
  - Performer of the Year: Útlendingahersveitin
  - Song of the Year: "Líf" by Einar Valur Scheving
- Various styles:
  - Pop Record of the Year: Dirty Paper Cup by Hafdís Huld
  - Rock and Alternative Record of the Year: Wine for My Weakness by Pétur Ben
  - Popular Record of the Year: Aparnir í Eden by Baggalútur
  - Other music Record of the Year: In Cod We Trust by Ghostigital
  - Performer of the Year: Björgvin Halldórsson
  - Song of the Year: "Allt fyrir mig" by Baggalútur and Björgvin Halldórsson
  - Singer of the Year (male): Bubbi Morthens
  - Singer of the Year (female): Lay Low

=== 2007 ===
Winners:

- Best Newcomer: Hjaltalín
- Best film / television music: Pétur Ben for Foreldrar
- Best Music Video of the Year: "The Great Unrest" by Gísli Darri & Bjarki Rafn with Mugison
- Album Art of the Year: Alli Metall, Kjartan Hallur & Mugison for Mugison album Mugiboogie
- Netverðlaun by tonlist.is: Páll Óskar
- Popular Artist of the Year by visir.is: Páll Óskar
- Útflutningsverðlaun: Kvartett Sigurðar Flosasonar & Jóels Pálssonar
- Motivational: Björgólfur Guðmundsson
- Honorary: Rúnar Júlíusson
- Classical and contemporary:
  - Best Record of the Year: Melódía by Carmina Chamber Choir and Árni Heimir Ingólfsson
  - Best Composition of the Year: "Apochrypha" by Hugi Guðmundsson
  - Best Artist of the Year: Kammersveitin Ísafold
- Jazz:
  - Best Record of the Year: Cycles by Einar Scheving
  - Best Artist of the Year: Sigurður Flosason (saxophone)
  - Best Composition of the Year: "Daboli" by Agnar Már Magnússon
- Various music styles:
  - Pop Record of the Year: Frágangur/Hold er mold by Megas and Senuþjófarnir
  - Rock / Alternative Record of the Year: Mugiboogie by Mugison
  - Record of the Year: "Við & við" by Ólöf Arnalds
  - Artist of the Year: Björk
  - Song of the Year: "Verum í sambandi" by Snorri Helgason / Bergur Ebbi Benediktsson
  - Songwriter of the Year: Högni Egilsson (from Hjaltalín)
  - Lyricist of the Year: Bergur Ebbi Benediktsson (Sprengjuhöllin)
  - Singer of the Year (male): Páll Óskar
  - Singer of the Year (female): Björk

=== 2008 ===
Selected winners:

- Best songwriter: Sigur Rós for Með suð í eyrum
- Best Composition of the Year: ORA by Áskell Másson
- Song of the Year: "Þú komst við hjartað í mér" by Toggi, Bjarki Jónsson & Páll Óskar
- Singer of the Year: Páll Óskar Hjálmtýsson
- Best Newcomer: Agent Fresco
- Motivational: Músíktilraunir
- Jazz Record of the Year: Fram af by Ómar Guðjónsson
- Classical and contemporary music Record of the Year: Fordlandia by Jóhann Jóhannsson
- Pop / Rock Record of the Year: Með suð í eyrum við spilum endalaust by Sigur Rós
- Performer of the Year: Anna Guðný Guðmundsdóttir (piano) on Tuttugu tillit til Jesúbarnsins (Olivier Messiaen)
- Music Video of the Year: "Wanderlust" by Björk Guðmundsdóttir / Encyclopedia Pictura
- Umslag ársins: Demoni Paradiso by Evil Madness
- Netverðlaun tónlist.is: Baggalútur
- Útrásarverðlaun: Mugison
- Popular Performer of the Year: Baggalútur
- Honorary: Ingólfur Guðbrandsson

=== 2014 ===
Held at Harpa on 14 March 2014.

Selected winners:

- Record of the Year: Komdu til mín svarta systir by Mammút
- Song of the Year: "Salt", Mammút
- Female Singer of the Year: Sigríður Thorlaciu (Hjaltalín)
- Male Singer of the Year: John Grant
- Songwriter of the Year: John Grant
- Band of the Year: rock band Skálmöld
- Honorary prize: Mezzoforte

=== 2015 ===
Held at Harpa (concert hall) in February 2015.

Winners:

- Album cover of the year: Kippi Kanínus—Temperaments. Designed by: Ingibjörg Birgisdóttir and Orri Jónsson
- Music video of the year: Úlfur Úlfur—Tarantúlur. Director: Magnús Leifsson.
- Producer of the year: Jóhann Jóhannsson – The Theory of Everything
- Album of the year: The Theory of Everything – Jóhann Jóhannsson
- Honorary Award: The Sugarcubes
- Rock & pop:
  - Album of the year, rock: In the Eye of the Storm – Mono Town
  - Album of the year, pop: Sorrí – Prins Póló
  - Song of the year, rock: "Peacemaker" – Mono Town
  - Song of the year, pop: "Color Decay" – Unnar Gísli Sigurmundsson (Júníus Meyvant)
  - Male vocalist, rock & pop: Valdimar Guðmundsson (Valdimar)
  - Female vocalist, rock & pop: Salka Sól Eyfeld (AmabAdamA)
  - Music performer, rock & pop: Skálmöld
  - Music event of the year, rock & pop: Skálmöld and the Iceland Symphony Orchestra at Eldborg
  - Lyricist, rock & pop: Snæbjörn Ragnarsson (Skálmöld)
  - Songwriter, rock & pop: Svavar Pétur Eysteinsson (Prins Póló)
  - Newcomer Album Of The Year, rock & pop: n1 – Young Karin
  - Brightest Hope, rock & pop: Júníus Meyvant
- Jazz & blues:
  - Newcomer Album of the Year, jazz & blues: Anna Gréta Sigurðardóttir
  - Song of the Year, jazz & blues: Sveðjan – ADHD
  - Album of the Year, jazz & blues: Íslendingur í Alhambrahöll – Stórsveit Reykjavíkur
  - Composer of the Year, jazz & blues: Stefán S. Stefánsson
  - Performer of the Year, jazz & blues: Sigurður Flosason
  - Event of the Year, jazz & blues: Jazzhátíð Reykjavíkur / Jazzfestival Reykjavík
- Contemporary & classical:
  - Event of the Year, contemporary & classical: Sumartónleikar Skálholtskirkju
  - Singer of the Year (Male), contemporary & classical: Elmar Gilbertsson
  - Singer of the Year (Female), contemporary & classical: Hanna Dóra Sturludóttir
  - Album of the Year, contemporary & classical: Fantasíur G.P. Telemann, Violin Solo – Elfa Rún Kristinsdóttir
  - Song of the Year, contemporary & classical: Ek ken di nag – Daníel Bjarnason
  - Composer of the Year, contemporary & classical: Daníel Bjarnason for Blow Bright & Ek ken di nag
  - Performer of the Year, contemporary & classical: Víkingur Heiðar Ólafsson
  - Newcomer of the Year, contemporary & classical: Oddur Arnþór Jónsson

=== 2016 ===
Held at Harpa (concert hall) in March 2016.

Selected winners:

- Rock Album of the Year: Destrier, Agent Fresco
- Pop Album of the Year: Vulnicura, Björk
- Rock Song of the Year: "Way Down We Go", Kaleo
- Pop Song of the Year: "Crystals", Of Monsters and Men
- Male Vocalist of the Year: Arnór Dan
- Female Vocalist of the Year: Björk
- Live Performer of the Year: Of Monsters and Men
- Music Event of the Year: Iceland Airwaves
- Lyricist of the Year: Björk
- Best Newcomer in Rock and Pop: Sturla Atlas

=== 2017 ===
Held 2 March 2017.

Selected winners:

- Performer of the year, jazz and blues: Stórsveit RVK
- Performer of the year, pop/rock: Emmsjé Gauti
- Performer of the year, classical/contemporary music: Schola Cantorum
- Concert of the year, pop/rock: Baggalútur Christmas concert
- Concert of the year, classical/contemporary music: Évgení Onegin in the production of the Icelandic Opera
- Pop song of the year: Hildur, "I'll Walk with You"
- Rock song of the year: Valdimar, "Slétt og fellt"
- Rap/hip hop song of the year: Emmsjé Gauti, "Silfurskotta"
- Jazz composition of the year: ADHD, Magnús Tryggvason Elíassen
- Classical/contemporary composition of the year: Hugi Guðmundsson, Hamlet in Absentia
- The brightest hope in jazz/blues: Sara Blandon
- The brightest hope in pop/rock: Auður
- Album of the year, electronic music: Samaris, Black Night
- Album of the year, rap/hip hop: Emmsjé Gauti, Vagg og Velta
- Album of the year, jazz/blues: Þorgrímur Jónsson Quintet, Constant Movement
- Album of the year, rock: Kaleo, A/B
- Album of the year, pop: Júníus Meyvant, Floating Harmonies
