= Ragnar Bjarnason =

Icelandic singer (1934–2020)

Raggi Bjarna
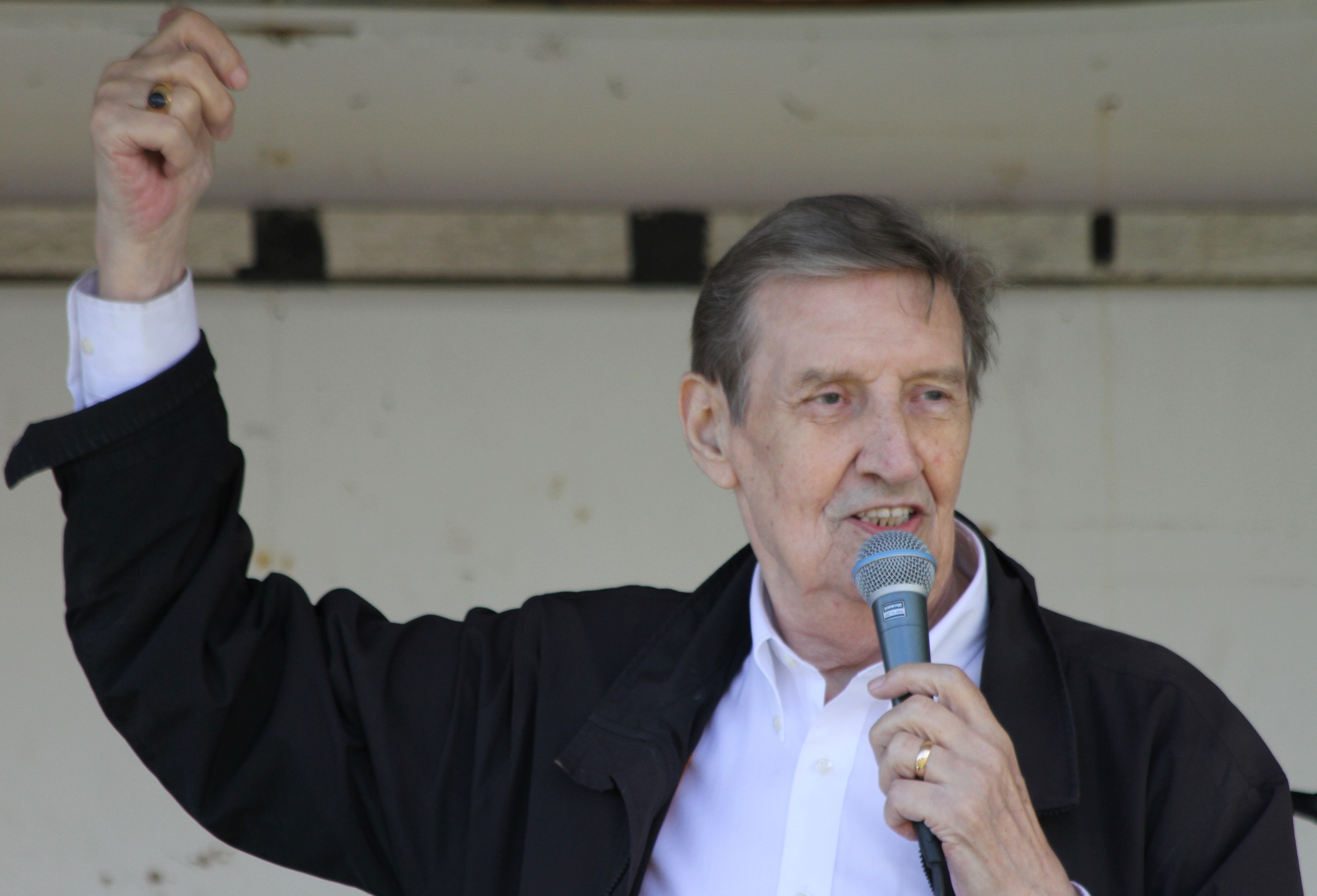
- July 2011

Background information
- Also known as: Raggi Bjarna
- Born: Ragnar Bjarnason; 22 September 1934; Reykjavík, Iceland
- Died: 25 February 2020 (aged 85) at Landspítali, Kópavogur, Iceland
- Occupation: Singer
- Years active: 1947–2020
- Formerly of: Hljómsveit Ragnars Bjarnasonar; Hljómsveit Svavars Gests; Sumargleðin
- Spouse: Helle Birthe Bjarnason

Ragnar Bjarnason, also known as Raggi Bjarna, (22 September 1934 – 25 February 2020) was an Icelandic singer. He was born in a small attic apartment at Lækjargata 12a in Reykjavík. He is the son of Bjarni Böðvarsson, a conductor of a renowned orchestra and Lára Magnúsdóttir a famous singer and also long-time singer in a church choir.

Ragnar started as a drummer in his father's band at the age of 13. At 16 he sang with Sigurður Ólafsson and by the age of 20 had his own albums. In 1955–1956, he became vocalist of Hljómsveit Svavars Gests (a relation that would go on until 1960) and in 1956, became a singer with KK sextet that continued until 1959. At the time, he released albums of his own.

After spending few years abroad, he returned in 1964. He rejoined Svavar briefly, before forming his own band in 1965 when Svavar's orchestra stopped performing. The band played for 19 consecutive years at Hótel Saga. In 1972, he also founded Sumargleðin that toured the country and gained great national fame.

Ragnar died on February 25, 2020.

== Discography ==
=== Albums ===
- 1971: Ragnar Bjarnason (SG-hljómplötur Records)
- 1995: Heyr mitt ljúfasta lag
- 1999: Við bjóðum góða nótt
- 2004: Vertu ekki að horfa – Afmælisútgáfa
- 2006: Vel sjóaður
- 2007: Gleðileg jól með Ragga Bjarna
- 2008: Lögin sem ekki mega gleymast
- 2009: Komdu í kvöld
- 2010: 75 ára afmælistónleikar
- 2013: Dúettar
- 2014: Falleg hugsun
- 2014: 80 ára
- 2017: Happy Hour Með Ragga Bjarna

=== 78 rpms and 45 rpm singles ===
- 1954: "Í faðmi dalsins" // "Í draumi með þér" (Tónika /Músikbúðin)
- 1954: "All of me" // "Ingibjörg Þorbergs – Nótt" (Tónika /Músikbúðin)
- 1954: "Anna" // "Anna í Hlíð" (Tónika /Músikbúðin)
- 1954: "Stína ó, Stína" // Heyrðu lagið (with Sigrún Jónsdóttir) (Tónika /Músikbúðin)
- 1955: "Ég er farmaður fæddur á landi" // "Síldarstúlkurnar" (Tónika /Músikbúðin)
- 1957: "Næturfuglinn" (with Sigrún Jónsdóttir) (Fálkinn)
- 1957: "Mærin frá Mexico" // "Óli Rokkariagnar" (with KK Sextet) (HSH)
- 1957: "Flökku Jói" // "Anastasía" (with KK Sextet) (HSH)
- 1958: "Lína segir stopp" // "Síðasti vagninn í Sogamýri" (HSH)
- 1968: "Líf og fjör" // "Tequila" (with KK Sextet) (HSH)
- 1959: "Vor við flóann" // "Hvítir svanir' (HSH)
- 1960: "Rock og Cha-cha-cha" // "Ævintýri" (Íslenskir Tónar)
- 1960: "Komdu í kvöld" // "Vertu ekki að horfa svona alltaf á mig" (Íslenskir Tónar)
- 1960: "Farðu frá..." // "Hún var með dimmblá augu" (Íslenskir Tónar)
- 1960: "Hún Gunna og hann Jón" // "Eins og fólk er flest" (Íslenskir Tónar)
- 1960: "Litla stúlkan mín" // "Ég er kokkur á kútter frá Sandi" (Íslenskir Tónar)
- 1961: "Ég er alltaf fyrir öllum" // "Komdu vina" (Íslenskir Tónar)
- 1961: "Vorkvöld í Reykjavík" / "Landafræði og ást" // "Þórsmerkurljóð" (Sigurdór Sigurdórsson) / "Komdu í kvöld" (Íslenskir Tónar)
- 1962: "Peppermint Twist" // "Twistin' at the bop" // "You must have been a beautiful baby" / Twistin' postman" // "Twist her" // "Everybody's twistin' down in Mexico" (Íslenskir Tónar)
- 1962: "Ship-o-hoj" // "Nótt í Moskvu" (Íslenskir Tónar)
- 1962: "Heyr mitt ljúfasta lag" // "Vertu sæl mey (Íslenskir Tónar)
- 1963: "Vertu sæl mín kæra" // "Stafróf ástarinnar" (Íslenskir Tónar)
- 1963: "Limbó rock" / "Limbó dans" // "Limbó í nótt" / "Limbó Twist (Íslenskir Tónar)
- 1963: "Ég man hverja stund" // "Skipstjóravalsinn" (Íslenskir Tónar)
- 1964: "Syrpa (Pálína, Gunna var í sinni sveit. úr 50c glasi.)." // "Ef þú grætur" (Íslenskir Tónar)
- 1964: "Vertu sæl mey" / "Heyr mitt ljúfasta lag" // "Veru sæl mín kæra" / "Ship-o-hoj" (Íslenskir Tónar)
- 1964: Fjögur jólalög (4 Christmas carols: "Hvít jól" / "Jólasveinninn minn" // "Jólin allstaðar" / "Litli trommuleikarinn") (with Elly Vilhjálms) (SG)
- 1965: "Hvert er farið blómið blátt" / "Brúðkaupið" // "Farmaður hugsar heim" / "Skvetta, falla, hossa og hrista" (with Elly Vilhjálms and Hljómsveit Svavars Gests band) (SG)
- 1965: "Heyr mína bæn" (with Hljómsveit Svavars Gests) / "Sveitin milli sanda" // "Útlaginn" / "Þegar ég er þyrstur" (SG)
- 1965: Járnhausinn (with Elly Vilhjálms) (SG)
- 1967: "Mamma" / "Ég sakna þín" // "Föðurbæn sjómansins" / "Ísland" (SG)
- 1968: "Úti í Hamborg" / "Þarna fer ástin mín" // "Yndælar stundir með þér" / "Hafið lokkar og laðar" (SG)
- 1969: "Megi dagur hver fegurð þér færa" / "Svarið er erfitt" // "Veiðimaðurinn" / "Væru, kæru, tæru dagar sumars" (Tónaútgáfan)
- 1972: "Ástarsaga" // "Bíddu mín" (SG)
- 2017: "I've Seen It All"
