= Emmsjé Gauti =

Icelandic rapper (born 1989)

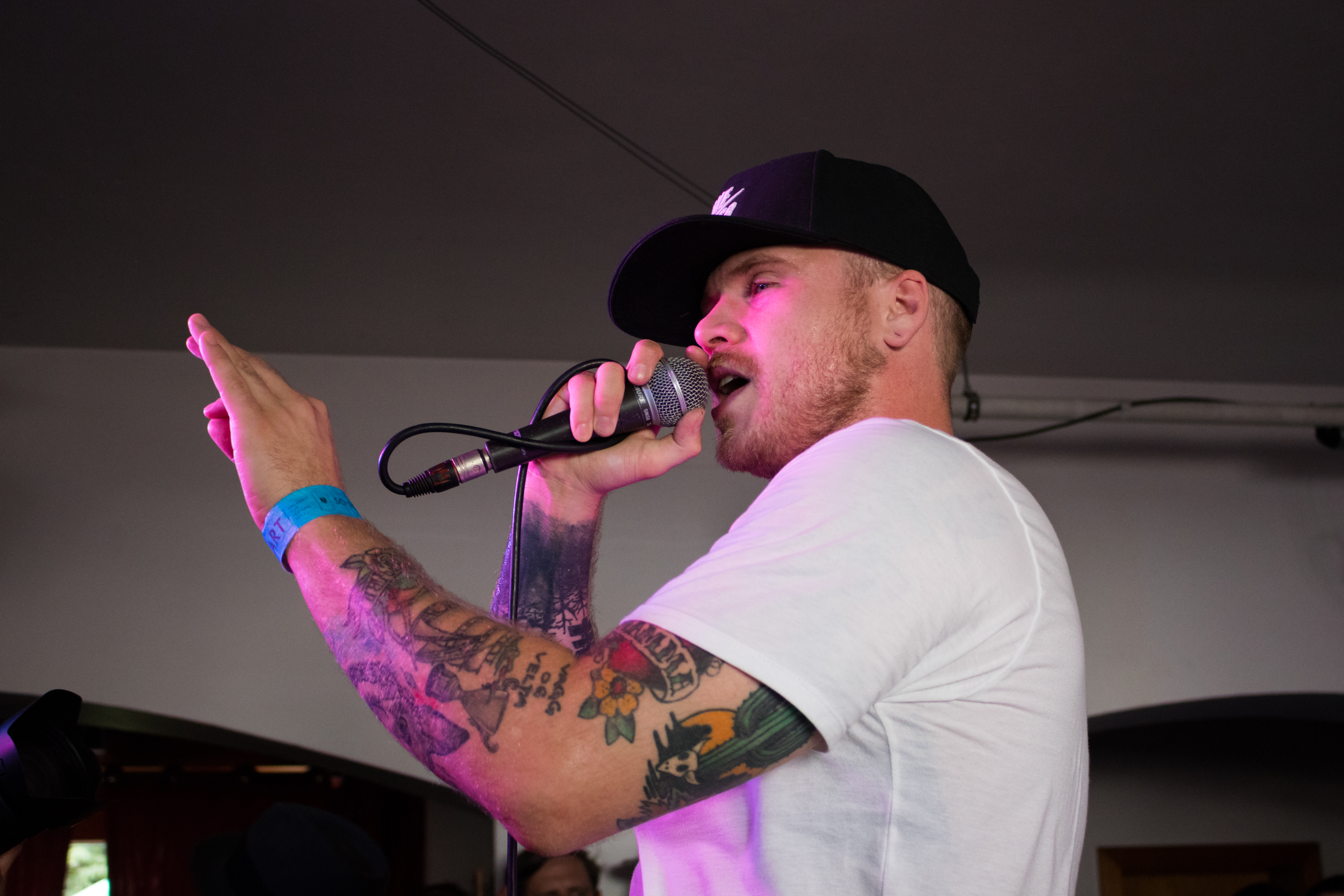
- Emmsjé Gauti at Haldern Pop Festival in 2017

Background information
- Born: Gauti Þeyr Másson; 17 November 1989 (age 36); Akureyri, Iceland
- Genres: Hip hop; rap; PBR&B
- Years active: 2002–present
- Website: emmsje.is

Gauti Þeyr Másson, better known as Emmsjé Gauti (meaning "MC Gauti"; born 17 November 1989 in Akureyri), is an Icelandic rapper and hip hop artist with R&B and pop influences. He started his rapping career in 2002 and was member of Icelandic rap groups 32c and Skábræður before going solo starting 2010 and releasing two albums Bara ég in 2011 and Þeyr in 2013 with "Kinky" as the first single from Þeyr. The music video was produced by Redd Lights.

He has also cooperated with a great number of local artists including Erpur, Dabbi T, Fire in the booth, Gnúsi Yones, IntroBeats, Diddi Fel, Jói Dagur, Úlfur Úlfur, Aron Can, Friðrik Dór, Berndsen, 7berg, Séra Bjössi and others.

== Personal life ==
Gauti studied graphic arts at Iðnskólinn (the Technical College). He appeared in an episode of the reality series Og Hvað where he was featured alongside Davíð Oddgeirsson. He is credited with the role of "Glow Stick Guy" in 2014 Icelandic film Land Ho! directed by Aaron Katz and Martha Stephens. He appeared in six episodes of the third season of Ófærð as the character Úlfur.

== Discography ==
=== Albums ===
- 2011: Bara ég
- 2013: Þeyr
- 2016: vagg&velta
- 2016: Sautjándi nóvember
- 2018: Fimm
- 2020: Bleikt Ský
- 2021: Mold (with Helgi Sæmundur)
- 2024: Fullkominn dagur til að kveikja í sér
- 2025: STÉTTIN

=== Mixtapes ===
Freyðibað með Emmsjé Gauta

=== Singles ===
- 2010: "Fyrirmynd"
- 2011: "Hemmi Gunn" (feat. Blazroca)
- 2011: "Dusta rykið"
- 2011: "Okkar leið" (feat. Friðrik Dór)
- 2011: "Sex Stafir" (feat. Hlynur)
- 2012: "Einar" (feat. Helgi Sæmundur)
- 2013: "Kinky"
- 2013: "Litalaus" (feat. Unnsteinn Manuel)
- 2013: "Hvolpaást" (feat. Unnsteinn Manuel & Larry BRD)
- 2014: "Nýju fötin keisarans"
- 2015: "Í Kvöld" (with Friðrik Dór)
- 2015: "Strákarnir"
- 2015: "Ómar Ragnarsson"
- 2016: "Djammæli"
- 2017: "Hógvær"
- 2018: "Lágmulinn" (feat. Birnir)
- 2018: "Eins og ég"
- 2019: "Saman" (feat. Floni)
- 2019: "Án Djóks"
- 2019: "Aloe Vera" (feat. Huginn)
- 2019: "Malbik" (feat. Króli)
- 2020: "Bleikt Ský"
- 2020: "Vandamál" (feat. Birnir)
- 2021: "Heim" (with Helgi Sæmundur)
- 2021: "Tossi" (with Helgi Sæmundur)
- 2021: "Pabbi" (with Helgi Sæmundur)
- 2022: "Klisja" (with Helgi Sæmundur)
- 2023: "Þúsund Hjörtu" (with Helgi Sæmundur)

=== Featured in ===
- 2011: "Gleymmérei" (Gabríel feat. Emmsjé Gauti & Björn Jörundur)
- 2011: "Það er komið sumar" (Margrét & Ragga ft. Emmsjé Gauti)
