= Júníus Meyvant =

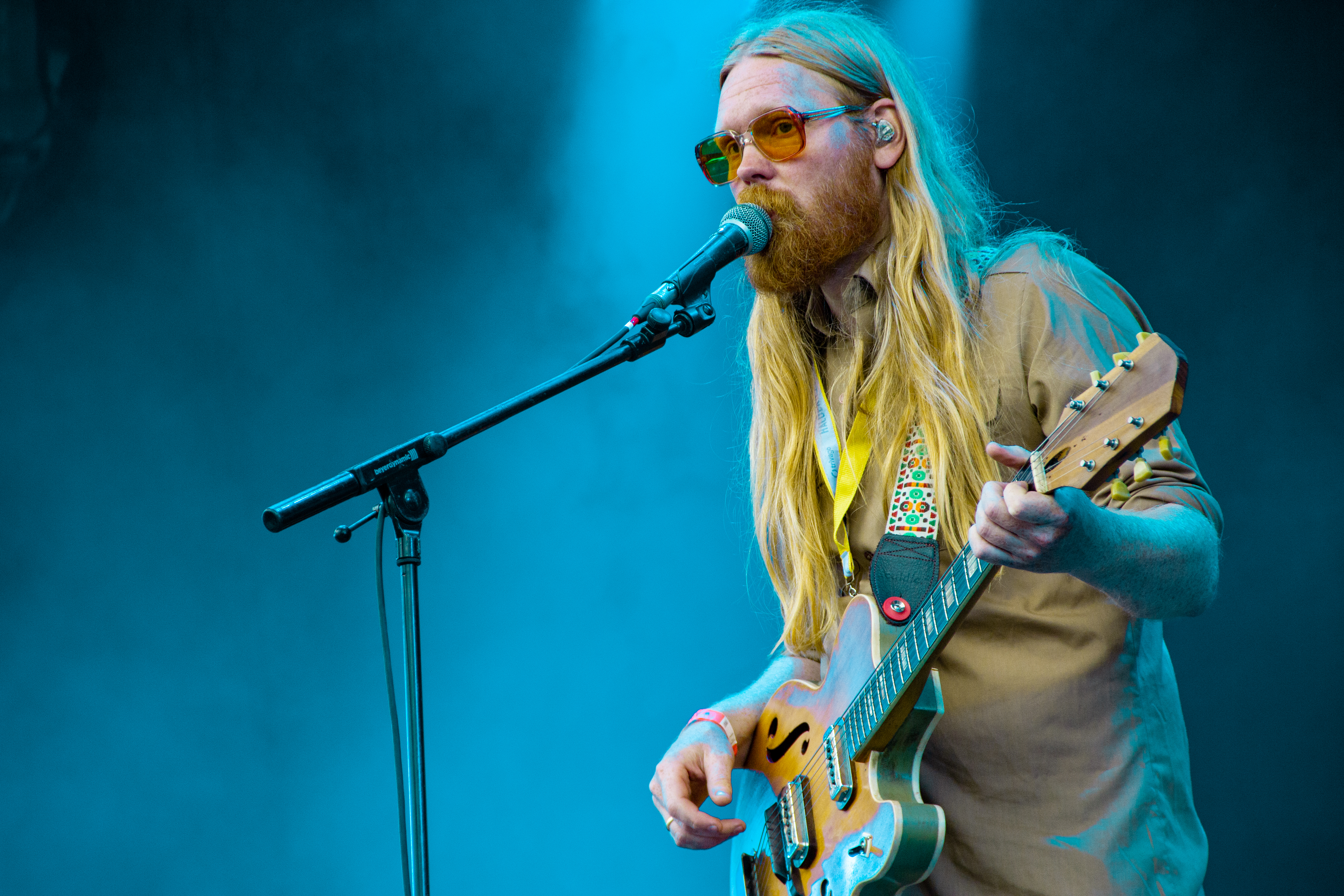
- Júníus Meyvant at Haldern Pop Festival 2019

Background information
- Birth name: Unnar Gísli Sigurmundsson
- Born: 5 September 1982 (age 42); Westman Islands, Iceland
- Labels: Record Records, Glassnote Records
- Website: juniusmeyvant.com

Júníus Meyvant is the stage name and musical project of Unnar Gísli Sigurmundsson, an Icelandic singer-songwriter.

NPR Music described his style as "soul-stirring melodies from way up north" in discussing his 2014 single, "Color Decay." That year, KEXP-FM, a Seattle radio station, named the single a song of the day.

Meyvant performs internationally, playing his first New York City show in 2017. He also performed at Bumbershoot 2017, a Seattle music festival.

He released his Floating Harmonies album through Record Records, an Icelandic label. The art on the cover is his own work.

== Awards and recognition ==
At the 2015 Icelandic Music Awards, Meyvant won Newcomer of the Year and Best Single of the Year for "Color Decay". He won Best Pop Album of the Year in the 2017 Icelandic Music Awards for Floating Harmonies.

== Discography ==
- Guru (2022)
- Across the Borders (2019)
- Floating Harmonies deluxe edition (2017)
- Floating Harmonies (2016)
- EP (2015)
