= Seabear =

Icelandic band

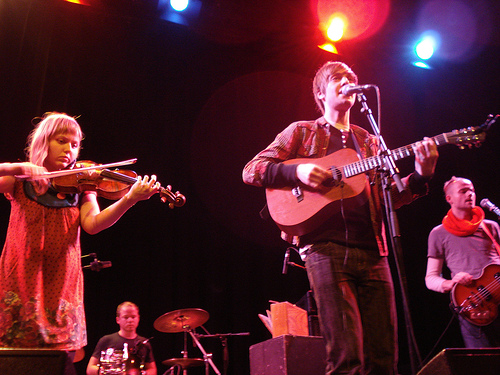
- Seabear performing in Rotterdam

Background information
- Origin: Reykjavík, Iceland
- Genres: Indie folk; indie pop
- Years active: 2000–present
- Label: Morr Music
- Members: Sindri Már Sigfússon; Guðbjörg Hlín Guðmundsdóttir; Ingibjörg Birgisdóttir; Halldór Ragnarsson; Örn Ingi Ágústsson; Kjartan Bragi Bjarnason; Sóley Stefánsdóttir
- Website: seabearia.com

Seabear is an Icelandic seven-piece indie-folk band from Reykjavík. Although hailing from Iceland, they sing primarily in English. They are signed to the Morr Music record label.

== History ==
=== Formation ===
Seabear started as a one-man project of Sindri Már Sigfússon in 2003. Performing for some time as a trio from 2005, the band grew to seven pieces in 2006. Other members of Seabear are Halldór Ragnarsson, Örn Ingi, Sóley Stefánsdóttir, Kjartan Bragi Bjarnason, Guðbjörg Hlín and Ingibjörg Birgisdóttir.

The band's music has been described as "Sufjan Stevens meets an unplugged Arcade Fire" by Clash. Sindri Már Sigfússon has been called the "Icelandic Beck" by Rolling Stone.

The band has toured Europe and the U.S. and played numerous festivals.

=== The Ghost That Carried Us Away (2007) ===
In 2007 Seabear released its debut album, The Ghost That Carried Us Away, on Morr Music. Its best known song is "I Sing I Swim". It was featured on Grey's Anatomy in 2010. The song "Cat Piano", from The Ghost That Carried Us Away, was featured in a BBC advert for Finding Neverland, as well as on Gossip Girl in 2008 (Season 2, Episode 2).

=== We Built a Fire (2010) ===
Its second LP, We Built a Fire, was released in March 2010. The song "Cold Summer", from We Built a Fire, was used in the closing scene of Episode 617 of Grey's Anatomy.

=== In Another Life (2022) ===
The band released the single "Waterphone" in 2019.

In 2022 they announced the release of their long-awaited third album In Another Life. This announcement coincided with the release of the single "Parade".

== Other projects ==
All members of Seabear have other musical and visual art projects. In 2008, Ingibjörg stopped playing live with the band in order to concentrate on her career as a visual artist. In 2008, Sindri released his solo album Clangour under the name Sin Fang Bous; in 2011 he released his second solo album, Summer Echoes, and shortened his stage name to Sin Fang. Sóley is signed as a soloist to Morr Music.

Kjartan is in a band called Kimono that has released three albums on Smekkleysa Records, a label founded by The Sugarcubes.

Dóri (Halldór Ragnarsson) is a visual artist and former member of Kimono from 2001 to 2007, releasing two albums with the band. He is also a member of electro/house duo with Sindri named Spítali.

Örn Ingi plays in the band Skakkamanage.

Inga and Sindri are also visual artists and, like Dóri, they have exhibited in solo and group shows in Iceland and abroad.

Guðbjörg toured with Sigur Rós during their 2012 and 2013 live shows, as part of the Okkr Ensemble.

== Discography ==
=== Albums ===
- I'm Me on Sundays (Self-released; Sindri Már Sigfússon solo as Seabear)
- The Ghost That Carried Us Away (2007, Morr Music)
- We Built a Fire (2010, Morr Music)
- In Another Life (2022, Morr Music)

=== EPs ===
- Singing Arc EP (Self-released)
- While the Fire Dies EP (2010, Sound of a Handshake)

=== Singles ===
- Teenage Kicks / Piano Hands 7" (2007, Morr Music)
- Lion Face Boy / Cold Summer 7" (2009, A Number of Small Things)
- Waterphone (2019, Morr Music)
