= Valdimar (band) =

Icelandic pop band

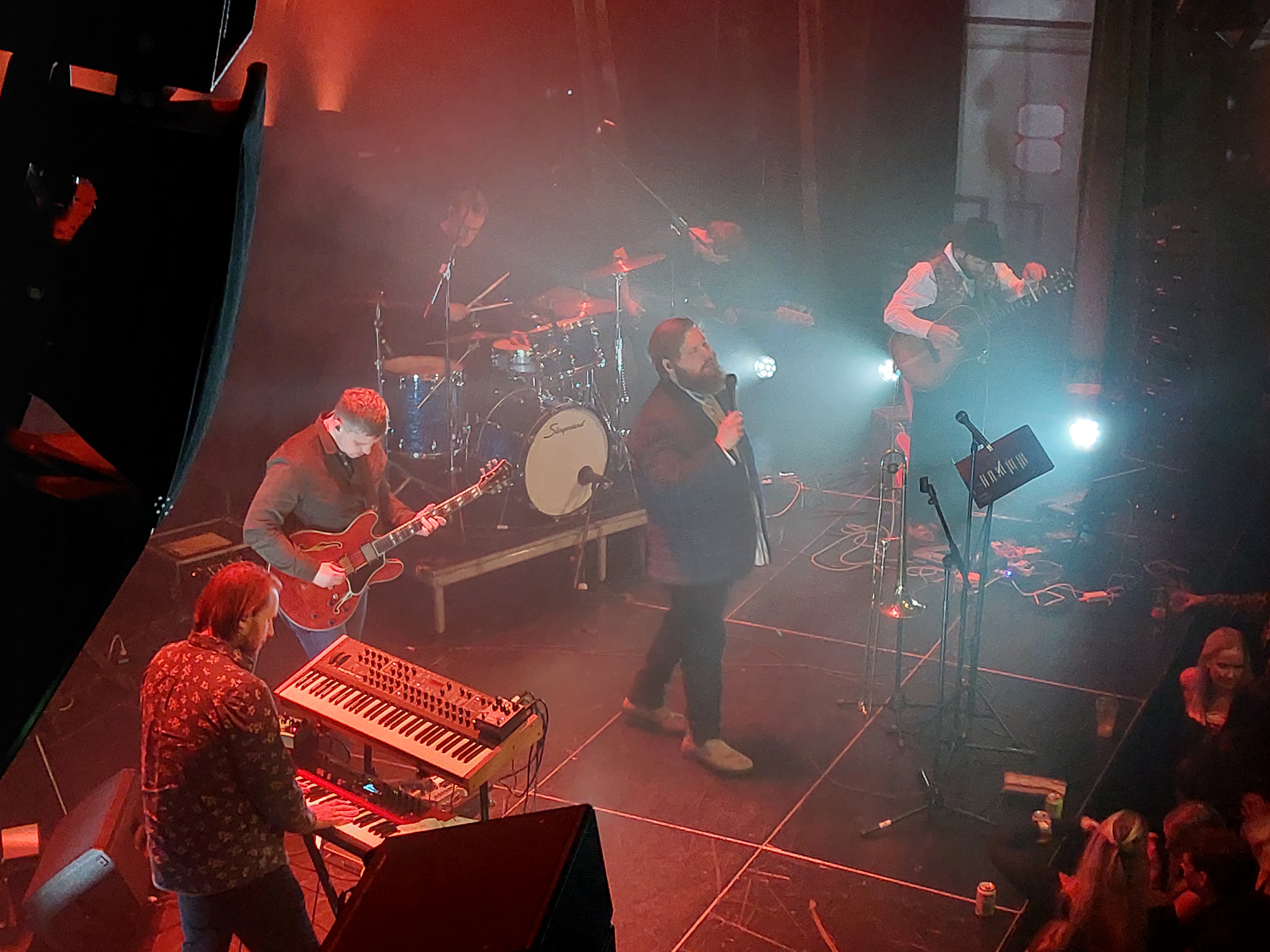
- Valdimar in 2025

Background information
- Origin: Keflavík
- Genres: Indie pop
- Years active: 2009-present
- Label: Independent
- Website: www.valdimarband.com

Valdimar is an Icelandic indie pop band that was established in 2009 as a duo by Valdimar Guðmundsson and Ásgeir Aðalsteinsson, both originating from Keflavik, Iceland.

== About ==
Guðlaugur Guðmundsson, Þorvaldur Halldórsson, Kristinn Evertsson and Högni Þorsteinsson gradually joined in to render it a 6-member band. Later, Örn Eldjárn joined the band as bass player. When performing live, the band is most often supported by a small brass section. Their music builds up from being soft and intimate to a hair-raising, heart-stirring energy, often with all members on stage playing full blast. The sound of their music can be described as an electro indie mix. Valdimar has performed several times at Iceland Airwaves music festival in Reykjavík. In addition to playing regular shows in Iceland, the band has performed in Germany, Switzerland, Austria, The Netherlands and Canada. For several years now, Valdimar has played an annual show on December 30 in Hljómahöll concert hall in Reykjanesbær near the roots of their origin in Keflavík.

== History ==
The band released their debut album Undraland in 2010 with critical acclaim and commercial success. The album was recorded in Geimsteinn recording studio in Keflavik and published by the studio label; Geimsteinn. Four singles that were released from the album reached the Top 10, including their biggest hit "Yfirgefinn", one of the most played songs of 2011 in Iceland. Valdimar was nominated as the best new artist at the 2011 Icelandic Music Awards. They followed Undraland by the album Um stund released in October 2012, and it acclaimed big success as well, and was nominated as the album of the year at the Icelandic Music Awards. It was the first album released by the band's own independent label. The album contained three radio hits; "Beðið Eftir Skömminni", "Sýn" and "Yfir Borgina". The band released their third album titled Batnar útsýnið in October 2014, including the song "Ryðgaður Dans" which became a big radio hit and is still one of Valdimar's most popular songs. Their most recent album Sitt sýnist hverjum was released in 2018 and the band worked closely with musician and producer Pétur Ben in the making of the album. The band released the hit single "Slétt og fellt" two years prior and during this time, multi-instrumentalist Örn Eldjárn joined the band on bass guitar. The album won the Icelandic Music Awards as the best rock album of 2018. The band celebrated the 10 year anniversary of their debut album Undraland with a grand show in Harpa concert hall in Reykjavík. The concert was originally scheduled for 2020 but the date was frequently delayed due to the COVID-19 pandemic. The concert was eventually held on the 23rd of April 2022 with great reception and critical acclaim.

== Discography ==
=== Albums ===
- 2010 – Undraland
- 2012 – Um stund
- 2014 – Batnar útsýnið
- 2018 – Sitt sýnist hverjum

=== Singles ===
- 2010 – Hverjum degi nægir sín þjáning
- 2011 – Yfirgefinn
- 2012 – Yfir borgina
- 2012 – Sýn
- 2013 – Beðið eftir skömminni
- 2014 – Læt það duga
- 2014 – Út úr þögninni
- 2014 – Ryðgaður dans
- 2015 – Læt það duga
- 2016 – Slétt og fellt
- 2018 – Of seint
- 2018 – Blokkin
- 2018 – Stimpla mig út
- 2025 – Lungu
- 2025 – Karlsvagninn
- 2026 – Tenerife

== Personnel ==
- Valdimar Guðmundsson - vocals and trombone
- Ásgeir Aðalsteinsson - guitars and programming
- Guðlaugur Már Guðmundsson - bass
- Þorvaldur Halldórsson - drums and percussion
- Kristinn Evertsson - keyboards and synthesizers
- Högni Þorsteinsson - guitars
- Örn Eldjárn - bass
