= 12 Tónar =

Icelandic record label

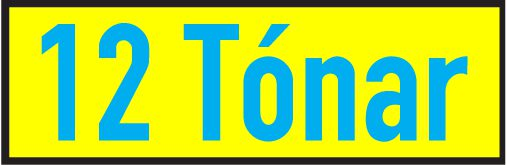
- Founded: 1998; 28 years ago
- Genre: Various
- Country of origin: Iceland
- Location: Reykjavík, Iceland
- Official website: 12tonar.is

12 Tónar (Icelandic pronunciation: [ˈtʰoulv ˈtʰouːnar̥], 'twelve tones') is a record shop in Reykjavík, Iceland, and also a record label for Icelandic artists. It is located on Skólavörðustígur 15, in downtown Reykjavík.

Founded in 1998 in Reykjavík, 12 Tónar has been well received by music lovers from the start. The store quickly became a meeting point for musicians such as Björk, Sigur Rós, múm, and the core of classical composers and performers.

12 Tónar is also an independent record label with nearly 80 releases in its catalogue. Many of the best musicians in Iceland have released their albums on the label, for example artists and bands such as Mugison, Trabant and Singapore Sling, Apparat Organ Quartet, Pétur Ben, Eivör Pálsdóttir, Ragnheiður Gröndal, Jóhann Jóhannsson, Hildur Guðnadóttir, Skúli Sverrisson, Ólöf Arnalds, Pink Street Boys, Samaris, and Jakobínarína.

In May 2006 12 Tónar opened a record store in Copenhagen, Denmark selling music from their own catalogue of artists as well as other Icelandic music. The store was situated on Fiolstraede 26. The store followed the good example from Iceland, with its friendly atmosphere and freshly brewed espresso for the customers while the music was spinning. It became a tradition with live in-store concerts taking place on Friday afternoons. On 26 January 2008 the Copenhagen store celebrated its closing with a live performance by the Danish band Tremolo Beer Gut.

Immediately succeeding the closing of the 12 Tónar record store in Copenhagen a brand new web-shop was introduced, allowing continued access to their family of artists.

On 21 June 2013 Gramophone magazine wrote about 12 Tónar, with the title "The best record store in the world?"

== List of releases ==
- Eivør Pálsdóttir – Krákan (CD, 12T001, 2003)
- Trabant – Á Bessastöðum (CDEP, 12T002, 2004; Limited edition of 300 copies)
- Brúðarbandið – Meira (CD, 12T003, 2004)
- Jóhann Jóhannsson – Dís (CD, 12T004, 2004)
- Mugison – Niceland (CD, 12T005, 2004)
- Steindór Andersen – Úlfhamsrímur (2CD, 12T006, 2004)
- Brynhildur Guðjónsdóttir – Edith Piaf: Music from the National Theatre Production (CD, 12T007, 2004)
- Þórir – I belive in this (CD, 12T008, 2004)
- Diddú – Ave María (CD, 12T009, 2004)
- Eivør Pálsdóttir – Eivør (CD, 12T010, 2004)
- Mugison – Mugimama Is This Monkey Music? (CD, 12T011, 2004)
- Hamlette Hok – Vikartindur (CD, 12T012, 2011)
- Eivør Pálsdóttir – Trøllabundin (CD, 12T013, 2005)
- Hudson Wayne – Battle of the Banditos (CD, 12T014, 2005)
- Trabant – Emotional (CD, 12T015, 2005)
- Schpilkas – So Long Sonja (CD, 12T016, 2005)
- Stórsveit Nix Noltes – Orkideur Hawaí (CD, 12T017, 2005)
- My summer as a salvation soldier – Anarchists are hopeless romantics (CD, 12T018, 2005)
- Ingibjörg Þorbergs – Í sólgulu húsi (CD, 12T019, 2005)
- Ragnheiður Gröndal – After the Rain (CD, 12T020, 2005)
- Apparat Organ Quartet – Apparat Organ Quartet (CD, 12T021, 2005)
- Brynhildur Guðjónsdóttir & BBQ – Grrrr... (CD, 12T022, 2005)
- Úlpa – Attempted Flight by Winged Men (CD, 12T023, 2005)
- KK & Ellen – Jólin eru að koma (CD, 12T024, 2005)
- Mugison – Little Trip (CD, 12T025, 2005)
- Singapore Sling – Taste the Blood of Singapore Sling (CD, 12T026, 2005)
- Flís – Vottur (CD, TT001, 2005)
- Various Artists – Kitchen Motors Family Album (CD, 12T027, 2006)
- Reykjavík! – Glacial Landscapes, Religion, Oppression & Alcohol (CD, 12T028, 2006)
- Pétur Ben – Wine For My Weakness (CD, 12T029, 2006)
- Lost In Hildurness (Hildur Guðnadóttir) – Mount A (CD, 12T030)
- KK – Blús (CD, 12T031, 2006)
- Biggi – id (CD, 12T032, 2006)
- Evil Madness – Demon Jukebox (CD, 12T033, 2006)
- Skúli Sverrisson – Sería (CD, 12T034, 2006)
- Jóhann Jóhannsson – IBM 1401, A User's Manual (CD, 12T035, 2006)
- Gavin Portland – III Views of distant towns (CD, 12T036, 2006)
- Ragnheiður Gröndal – Þjóðlög (CD, 12T037, 2006)
- Sigrún Hjálmtýsdóttir, Páll Óskar Hjálmtýsson, Örn Árnason – Það vantar spýtur: Bestu lög Ólafs Hauks (CD, 12T038, 2006)
- Rannveig Káradóttir – Mig langar að læra (CD, 12T039, 2006)
- Elísabet Eyþórsdóttir – Þriðja leiðin (CD, 12T040, 2006)
- Ólöf Arnalds – Við Og Við (CD, 12T041, 2007)
- Jakobínarína – The First Crusade (CD, 12T042, 2007)
- Rökkurró – Það kólnar í kvöld (CD, 12T043, 2007)
- My summer as a salvation soldier – Activism (CD, 12T044, 2007)
- Egill Ólafsson – Hymnalög (CD, 12T045, 2007)
- Leg: Music from the National Theatre Production (CD, TT002, 2007)
- Villi Valli – Í tímans rás (CD, 12T046, 2008)
- Evil Madness – Demoni Paradiso (CD, 12T047, 2008)
- The Brian Jonestown Massacre – Just Like Kicking Jesus (EP/CD, 12T048EP/12T048, 2008)
- Söngvaseiður (The Sound of Music): Music from the Reykjavík City Theatre Production (CD, 12T049, 2009)
- Jóhann Jóhannsson – And in the Endless Pause There Came the Sound of Bees (CD, 12T050, 2009)
- Steindór Andersen & Hilmar Örn Hilmarsson – Stafnbúi (CD+Book, 12T051, 2012)
- Jóhann Jóhannsson – Englabörn (LP Test Pressing, 12T052, 2008; not released)
- Hudson Wayne – How Quick is your Fish? (CD, 12T052, 2010)
- Apparat Organ Quartet – Pólýfónía (CD, 12T053, 2010)
- Gauragangur: Music from the Reykjavík City Theatre Production (CD, 12T054, 2010)
- Rökkurró – Í annan heim (CD, 12T055, 2010)
- Samaris – Samaris (CD/2LP, 12T056/12T056LP, 2013; Pink and sea-green vinyl, limited edition of 500 copies)
- Jóhann Jóhannsson – The Miners’ Hymns (CD, 12T057, 2011)
- Galdrakarlinn í OZ (Wizard of Oz): Music from the Reykjavík City Theatre Production (CD, 12T058, 2011)
- Karlakór Reykjavíkur – Á aðventu með Karlakór Reykjavíkur (CD, 12T059, 2011)
- Grísalappalísa – ALI (CD, 12T060, 2013)
- Jóhann Jóhannsson – Copenhagen Dreams (CD, 12T061, 2012)
- Various Artists – Inspired by Harpa: The Traditional Songs of Iceland (CD, 12T062, 2013)
- Samaris – Silkidrangar (CD/LP, 12T063/12T063LP, 2014)
- Rökkurró – Innra (CD, 12T064, 2014)
- Grísalappalísa – Rökrétt framhald (CD, 12T065, 2014)
- Low Roar – 0 (CD/2LP, 12T066/12T066LP, 2014; White 180 gr. vinyl, limited edition of 500 copies)
- Oyama – Coolboy (CD, 12T067, 2014)
- Mr. Silla – Mr. Silla (CD, 12T068, 2015)
- Pink Street Boys – #1 Hits (LP, 12T069LP, 2015)
- Samaris – Black Lights (CD, 12T070, 2016)
- Pink Street Boys – Smells Like Boys (LP, 12T071LP, 2017)
- Hilmar Örn Hilmarsson – Börn náttúrunnar (Children of Nature): Original Soundtrack (CD/LP, 12T072/12T072LP, 2018)

=== Classical ===
- Guðrún Jóhanna Ólafsdóttir (Mezzo-Soprano) & Víkingur Heiðar Ólafsson (Piano) – Grieg & Schumann (CD, 12TK001, 2006)
- Ísafold Chamber Orchestra (Director: Daníel Bjarnason) – Ísafold (SACD, 12TK002, 2006)
- Ísafold Chamber Orchestra (Director: Daníel Bjarnason) – All sounds are silence (SACD, 12TK003, 2008)
- Guðrún Jóhanna Ólafsdóttir (Mezzo-Soprano) & Francisco Javier Jáuregui (Guitar) – Mitt er þitt / Mine is yours: Songs from Iceland and Spain (CD, 12TK004, 2008)
- Kristinn Árnason (Guitar) – Giuliani, Sor, Aguado, Carcassi (CD, 12TK005, 2009)
- Kristinn Árnason (Guitar) – Transfiguratio (Mudarra, Weiss, Mertz, Albeniz, Pujol, Másson) (CD, 12TK006, 2013)

== See also ==
- List of record labels
