= Reykjavik to Rotterdam (2007) =

Reykjavik to Rotterdam (2007) was a festival first organized by the Reykjavik To Foundation. The main venue was Lantaren/Venster. The second venue was Waterfront. 12 Tónar set up their shop as well.

== Performances ==
- Mr. Silla & Mongoose
- Hafdís Huld
- Rass
- Apparat Organ Quartet
- Seabear
- Lost in Hildurness
- Reykjavik!
- Mammút
- Ghostigital
- Evil Madness
- Rökkurró
- Múm

== Movies ==
- Heima - a film by Sigur Rós
- Man on my back
- Family reunion
- Another
- Thanks for helping
- Lost my head
- Hidebound
- Farmer John's world
- Anna and the moods
- Midnight

== Referenced ==
=== Further reading ===
- https://grapevine.is/music/live-music-reviews/2007/12/07/when-reykjavik-visits-rotterdam/
- https://icenews.is/2007/08/07/imx-announces-reykjavik-to-rotterdam-culture-festival/
- https://3voor12.vpro.nl/artikelen/overzicht/2007/november/hoe-noorderlijker-hoe-maller.html
