= Kitchen Motors Family Album =

Fjöskyldualbúm Tilraunaeldhússins/Kitchen Motors Family Album

Compilation album by Various
- Released: May 2006
- Genre: Electronica, Experimental music
- Length: 74:53
- Label: 12 Tónar

Professional ratings
Review scores
Source	Rating
The Reykjavík Grapevine	(not rated)

Kitchen Motors Family Album (Icelandic: Fjölskyldualbúm Tilraunaeldhússinsis) a compilation album released in 2006. It came into being two years after the celebration of Kitchen Motors' 5 year anniversary on May 1, 2004. The album features mostly previously unreleased songs by the artists and bands who have worked with Kitchen Motors since it started in 1999. For some artists this marks their debut under a solo name, e.g. Sigur Rós front man and vocalist Jón Þór Birgisson contributes a track under the name Frakkur, while Múm band member Gunnar Örn Tynes makes a contribution under the name illi vill. While Auxpan is contributing with a song called "Ugla" and Amiina (who participate with a song of their own) has composed a song of the same name they bear no resemblance to each other.

== Track listing ==
1. "Mic dictator of love anthem" (Represensitive Man) – 0:56
2. "Shoo ba ba" (Borko) – 4:07
3. "Mugi wants to be Mum" (Mugison) – 2:13
4. "GítStemm" (Benni Hemm Hemm) – 3:40
5. "Hemipode" (Amina) – 4:34
6. "Frank's Theme" (Slowblow) – 1:32
7. "Ég sé í hljóđum" (illi vill) – 5:39
8. "Ástarjátning" (Sigridur Nielsdottir) – 1:57
9. "ammælisstrákur" (Frakkur) – 5:31
10. "Einvegis" (Hilmar Jensson & Skúli Sverrisson) – 4:35
11. "Upptalning" (Paul Lydon) – 3:16
12. "Asleep in a hiding place" (múm) – 4:28
13. "Beginning and end" (Jóhann Jóhannsson) - 6:21
14. "Purer, softer, deader?" (Kippi Kaninus) – 4:52
15. "Your Favorite DJ" (DJ Musician) – 4:54
16. "Demon Jukebox" (Stilluppsteypa) – 2:55
17. "Ugla" (Auxpan) – 2:39
18. "Stylophonia" (Apparat Organ Quartet) – 3:44
19. "Theme for Reynimelur 92" (Músikvatur) – 2:00
20. "Hjartafanturinn skrjáfar" (Kira Kira) – 2:57
21. "Kitchen Motors anthem" (The Kitchen Motors Family) – 1:52
