= Auðunn Blöndal =

Icelandic television personality, actor and comedian

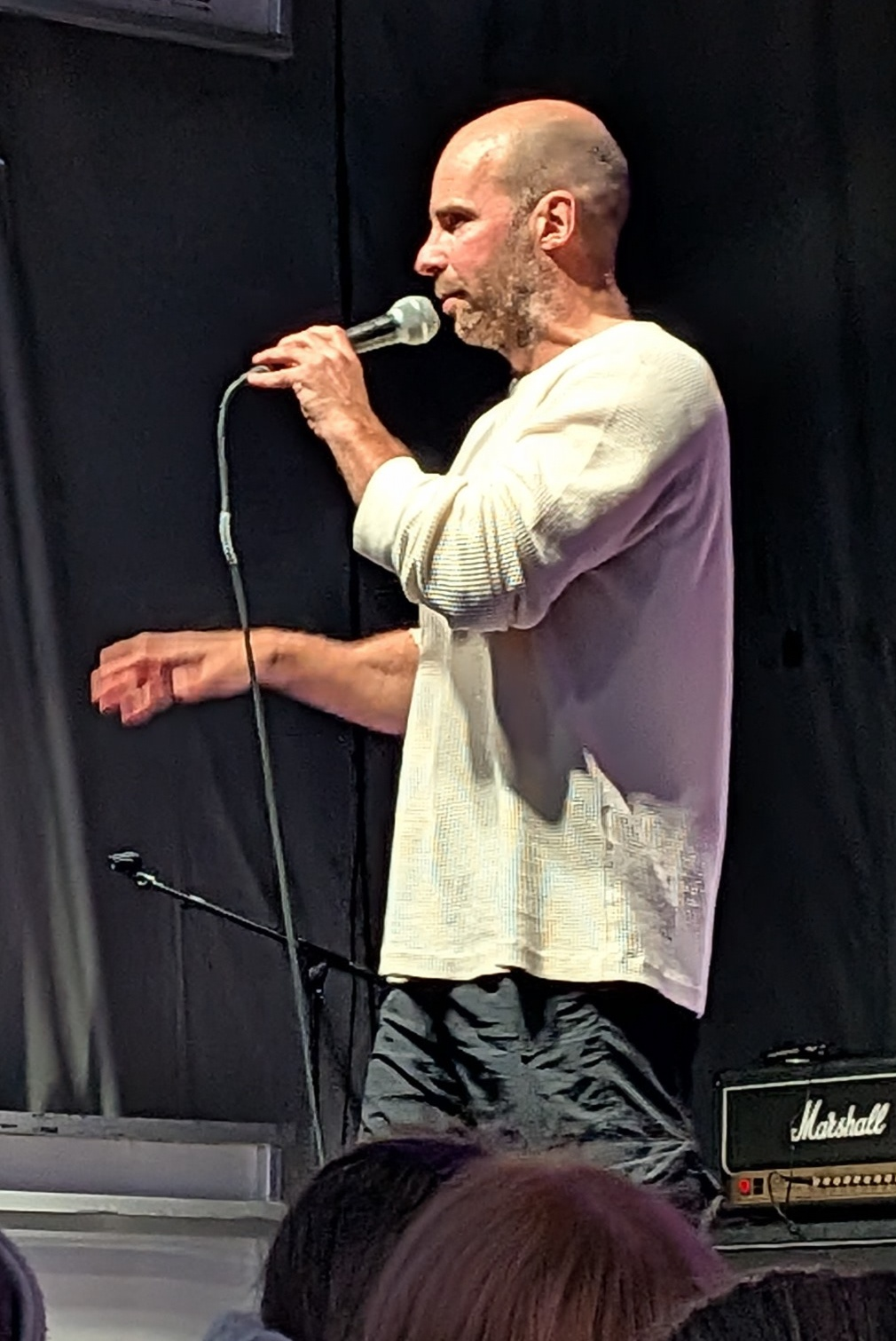
- Born: 8 July 1980 (age 45); Sauðárkrókur, Iceland
- Other names: Auddi; Auddi Blö
- Occupations: Television personality; actor; comedian
- Years active: 2001–present

Auðunn Blöndal (Icelandic pronunciation: [ˈœyːðʏnː ˈplœntaːl̥]; born 8 July 1980) is an Icelandic television personality, actor and comedian. He is best known as the co-host of the comedy shows 70 mínútur and Strákarnir, and as the host of Tekinn, the Icelandic version of Ashton Kutcher's show Punk'd. He also starred in the comedy series Svínasúpan (English: The Pig Soup), and in the Icelandic production of Richard Herring's, known as Typpatal in Icelandic.

== Filmography ==
- The Big Rescue (2009) – Bully
- The Magic Wardrobe (2011)
- Víti í Vestmannaeyjum (2018)
- Gullregn (2020) – Orri
- Cop Secret (2021) – Bússi
