= Life Is Killing My Rock 'N' Roll =

Life Is Killing My Rock 'n' Roll

Studio album by Singapore Sling
- Released: 2004 (Iceland); 14 September 2004 (US)
- Recorded: 2004
- Genre: Neo-psychedelia
- Label: Sheptone (Iceland); Stinky (US)
- Producer: Henrik Björnsson, Aron Arnarsson

Singapore Sling chronology
The Curse of Singapore Sling (2002)	Life Is Killing My Rock 'n' Roll (2004)	Taste the Blood of Singapore Sling (2005)

Life Is Killing My Rock 'n' Roll is the second studio album by Icelandic neo-psychedelia band Singapore Sling. The album was released in 2004 by Sheptone Records in Iceland and, shortly after, distributed in the United States by the independent label Stinky Records.

== Production ==
The album was recorded at Thule Studios in Reykjavík and mastered at Sterling Sound in New York City by Chris Gehringer. The engineer was Aron Arnarsson, assisted by Palli and Steini. The album was produced by Henrik Bjornsson and co-produced by Arnarsson.

Apart from the band, additional performers included organ player Jóhann Jóhannsson from the art rock band Apparat Organ Quartet and the female singers Elsa Maria and Anna Margret.

== Reception ==
Professional ratings
Review scores
Source	Rating
AllMusic	2.5/5 stars
PopMatters	generally unfavourable

AllMusic's review was generally unfavourable, stating, "Though these tracks plum the depths of their style's bruised and broken magnet trajectory, a lot of Life Is Killing My Rock 'n' Roll seems like a sleepwalk. A sleepwalk in a cool leather vest and shades, to be sure. But it's still a sleepwalk." PopMatters wrote, "This album seems to take a step back [from The Curse Of], though, and it isn't as powerful as the first go-around."

Life Is Killing My Rock 'n' Roll was chosen by a guest reviewer for Drowned in Sound as "their favourite – or most interesting, most controversial, most fun, most whatever – record of the past decade" in an article on Nordic music.

== Track listing ==
1. "Sunday Club" – 3:15
2. "Curse, Curse, Curse" – 3:10
3. "Rockit" – 2:30
4. "Nightlife" – 3:34
5. "Life Is Killing My Rock'n'Roll" – 3:31
6. "Twisted and Sick" – 3:51
7. "J.D." – 4:35
8. "Living Dead" – 4:47
9. "Sugar" – 4:11
10. "Guiding Light" – 6:14
11. "A Little Love" – 5:06
12. "Let's Go Dancing" – 6:38

== Personnel ==
Singapore Sling

- Henrik Bjornsson – vocals, guitar, keyboards, bass guitar
- Helgi Örn Pétursson – guitar, keyboards
- Einar Pór Kristjannsson – guitar
- Thorgeir Gudmundsson – bass guitar
- Bjarni Fr. Johannsson – drums
- Iggi Sniff – maracas, tambourine

Additional members

- Elsa Maria – vocals (track 7)
- Johan Johannsson – Wurlitzer organ, Farfisa organ, Moog synthesizer (tracks 10–12)
- Anna Margret – vocals, backing vocals (tracks 7, 8 and 10)
