= Little Trip =

Soundtrack album by Mugison
- Released: 2005
- Length: 41:27
- Label: 12 Tónar
- Producer: Mugison, Birgir Jón Birgisson

Mugison chronology
Mugimama Is This Monkey Music? (2004)	Little Trip (2005)	Mýrin (2007)

Professional ratings
Review scores
Source	Rating
AllMusic	(?)
PopMatters	6/10 stars

Little Trip is a soundtrack by Mugison, released in 2005, for the movie A Little Trip to Heaven by Baltasar Kormákur.

== Track listing ==
1. "Pétur Grétarsson" - 0:36
2. "Go Blind" - 2:52
3. "Little Trip to Heaven" - 3:44
4. "Watchdog" - 1:10
5. "Mugicone" - 1:22
6. "Piano for Tombstones" - 0:32
7. "Clip" - 10" - 3:18
8. "Alone in a Hotel" - 1:40
9. "Rush" - 3:38
10. "Pétur Þor Ben" - 5:23
11. "Watchcat" - 2:24
12. "My Nobel Prize" - 2:44
13. "Alone in the Office" - 1:28
14. "Mugicone Part" - 2" - 2:12
15. "Stiff" - 1:41
16. "Sammi & Kjartan" - 2:15
17. "Unnamed" - 4:26

== Charts ==
Chart (2005)	Peak position
Icelandic Albums (Tónlist)	1
