= Þórir =

Þórir is an Icelandic given name. It may refer to:

- Þórir, mononym for 12th-century Norwegian Benedictine monk known as Theodoric the Monk
- Thorir Hund (AKA Þórir hundr, c. 990 – after 1030), chief in Hålogaland
- Þórir Jóhann Helgason (born 2000), Icelandic footballer
- Þórir Hergeirsson (born 1964), Icelandic handball coach
- Þórir Jónsson (born 1952), Icelandic former footballer
- Þórir Georg Jónsson, Icelandic singer-songwriter known by the pseudonym My Summer As A Salvation Soldier
- Þórir Magnússon (born 1948), Icelandic basketball player
- Þórir Ólafsson (born 1979), Icelandic handball player
- Thorir Rögnvaldarson, Norwegian Viking and jarl of the 9th century
- Þórir Jökull Steinfinnsson, Icelandic 13th century warrior and possibly a skald
- Þórir Þorbjarnarson (born 1998), Icelandic basketball player
- Tomrair (died 848), Viking jarl, also known as Þórir, Thorir, and Thórir
