= The First Crusade (disambiguation) =

The First Crusade was the successful Christian military campaign to conquer Jerusalem and the Holy Land.

The First Crusade may also refer to:

- The First Crusade (video), a video of concerts, interviews, etc. released by the Swedish band HammerFall
- The First Crusade (album), an album by the Icelandic band Jakobínarína
