= Mugiboogie =

Studio album by Mugison
- Released: June 24, 2008
- Recorded: 2007
- Length: 49:05
- Label: Ipecac Recordings (CD) (IPC-104)

Mugison chronology
Mýrin (2007)	Mugiboogie (2008)

Professional ratings
Review scores
Source	Rating
Drowned In Sound	7/10 stars
PopMatters	6/10 stars
Pitchfork Media	(6.2/10)

Mugiboogie is an album by Mugison, released in 2008 by Ipecac Recordings. Mugison recorded and mixed it together with Birgir Jón Birgisson in the Sundlaugin studio in Iceland.

== Track listing ==
All tracks written by Mugison.

1. "Mugiboogie" – 3:56
2. "The Pathetic Anthem" – 4:14
3. "To the Bone" – 3:38
4. "Jesus Is a Good Name to Moan" – 4:36
5. "George Harrison" – 3:28
6. "Deep Breathing" – 5:14
7. "I'm Alright" – 2:32
8. "The Animal" – 3:58
9. "Two Thumb Sucking Son of a Boyo" – 3:46
10. "The Great Unrest" – 4:30
11. "My Love I Love" – 2:10
12. "Sweetest Melody" – 6:56

== Personnel ==
- Mugison – vocals, guitar, jaw harp (listed as mouthorgan)
- Arnar Gislason – drums, backing vocals on "Sweetest Melody"
- Guðni Finnsson – bass, backing vocals on "Sweetest Melody"
- Davið Þór Jónsson – Hammond organ, Moog synthesizer, celesta, pump organ and all kinds of horns, backing vocals on "Sweetest Melody"
- Pétur Ben – guitar on "Mugiebooie", "Jesus Is a Good Name to Moan" and "Sweetest Melody", string arrangements on "Deep Breathing" and "The Great Unrest", backing vocals on "Sweetest Melody"
- Rúna Esradóttir – whispering on "The Pathetic Anthem"
- Helgi Hrafn Jónsson – trombone on "Mugieboogie"
- Björgvin Gislasson – guitar and sitar on "George Harrison" and "Sweetest Melody"
- Una Sveinbjarnardóttir, Zbigniew Dubnik, Pálína Árnadóttir, Gréta Guðnadóttir – violin on "Deep Breathing" and "The Great Unrest"
- Ótarrar Sæmundsen – double bass on "Deep Breathing" and "The Great Unrest"
- Guðmundur Kristmundsson, Þórarinn Már Baldursson – viola on "Deep Breathing" and "The Great Unrest"
- Sigurgeir Agnarsson, Margrét Árnadóttir – cello on "Deep Breathing" and "The Great Unrest"

== Trivia ==
- The poster for the European Tour was designed by Berlin-based design studio Zwölf.
