= Hannes Þór Halldórsson =

Icelandic footballer

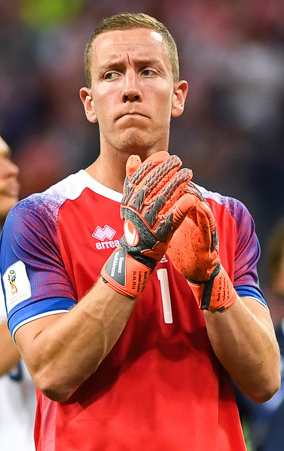
- Hannes with Iceland at the 2018 FIFA World Cup

Personal information
- Full name: Hannes Þór Halldórsson
- Date of birth: 27 April 1984 (age 42)
- Place of birth: Reykjavík, Iceland
- Height: 1.93 m (6 ft 4 in)
- Position: Goalkeeper

Senior career*
Years	Team	Apps	(Gls)
2002–2004	Leiknir R.	3	(0)
2005	Afturelding	18	(0)
2006	Stjarnan	18	(0)
2007–2010	Fram	84	(0)
2011–2013	KR	63	(0)
2012	→ Brann (loan)	1	(0)
2014–2015	Sandnes Ulf	45	(0)
2015–2016	NEC	8	(0)
2016	→ Bodø/Glimt (loan)	14	(0)
2016–2018	Randers	65	(0)
2018–2019	Qarabağ	4	(0)
2019–2021	Valur	58	(0)
2022	Víkingur Reykjavík	0	(0)
Total		381	(0)

International career^{‡}
2011–2021	Iceland	77	(0)
- * Club domestic league appearances and goals as of 25 September 2021 ‡ National team caps and goals as of 8 September 2021

Hannes Þór Halldórsson (born 27 April 1984) is an Icelandic filmmaker and former professional footballer. He was a member of the Iceland national team where he was capped 77 times and appeared at UEFA Euro 2016 and the 2018 FIFA World Cup.

== Club career ==
=== Iceland ===
Hannes played club football in Iceland for Leiknir, Afturelding, Stjarnan, Fram and KR.

Hannes joined KR at the age of 5. He quit football at the age of 20 following a shoulder injury, before returning to the sport and joining third-tier Leiknir. Hannes started his career at Leiknir at a time when the team was in the fourth- and third tier of the Icelandic football league system. Hannes was let go from Leiknir in 2004 after making a number of serious mistakes in an important game that revolved around progressing to the second tier.

During his time at Leiknir, Hannes sought to join Númi, which played in the Icelandic bottom tier, after struggling to get into the Leiknir first team, but the team rejected him. After leaving Leiknir, Hannes joined Afturelding, which played in the third tier.

Early in his career, Hannes struggled with shoulder injuries. Hannes was known for poor kicking during his early career.

In 2006, Hannes joined Stjarnan, which played in the second tier.

He joined Fram, a first tier team, in 2007.

Hannes said that at the time (in early 2005), he set a goal of becoming a goalkeeper for a team in the first tier in three years' time, and hoped to play abroad after that.

He joined KR in 2011, winning the double with the team in his first season.

=== Out of Iceland ===
On 28 March 2012, Hannes joined Norwegian club SK Brann on a short-term loan, as a cover for injured goalkeeper Piotr Leciejewski.

In December 2013, Hannes joined Norwegian club Sandnes Ulf, having trained with the club in October 2013 as preparation for Iceland's World Cup playoff game against Croatia. He became a professional footballer in 2014.

On 6 July 2015, Dutch Eredivisie club NEC announced they had signed Hannes on a two-year contract.

On 15 July 2016, Danish club Randers FC signed Hannes on a three-year contract.

On 3 July 2018, Hannes signed a two-year contract with Qarabağ FK. On 5 April 2019, he left Qarabağ by mutual consent. Hannes had at that point become the third-choice goalkeeper at Qarabag.

=== Return to Iceland ===
On 9 April 2019, Icelandic club Valur signed Hannes on a four-year contract. Hannes cited family reasons and the four-year contract as reasons to return to the Icelandic top flight division. He left Valur on 11 November 2021.

On 16 March 2022, Hannes announced his retirement from football.

In June 2022, Hannes agreed to join Víkingur Reykjavík as backup goalkeeper following the injuries of Víkingur goalkeepers Ingvar Jónsson and Uggi Auðunsson.

== International career ==
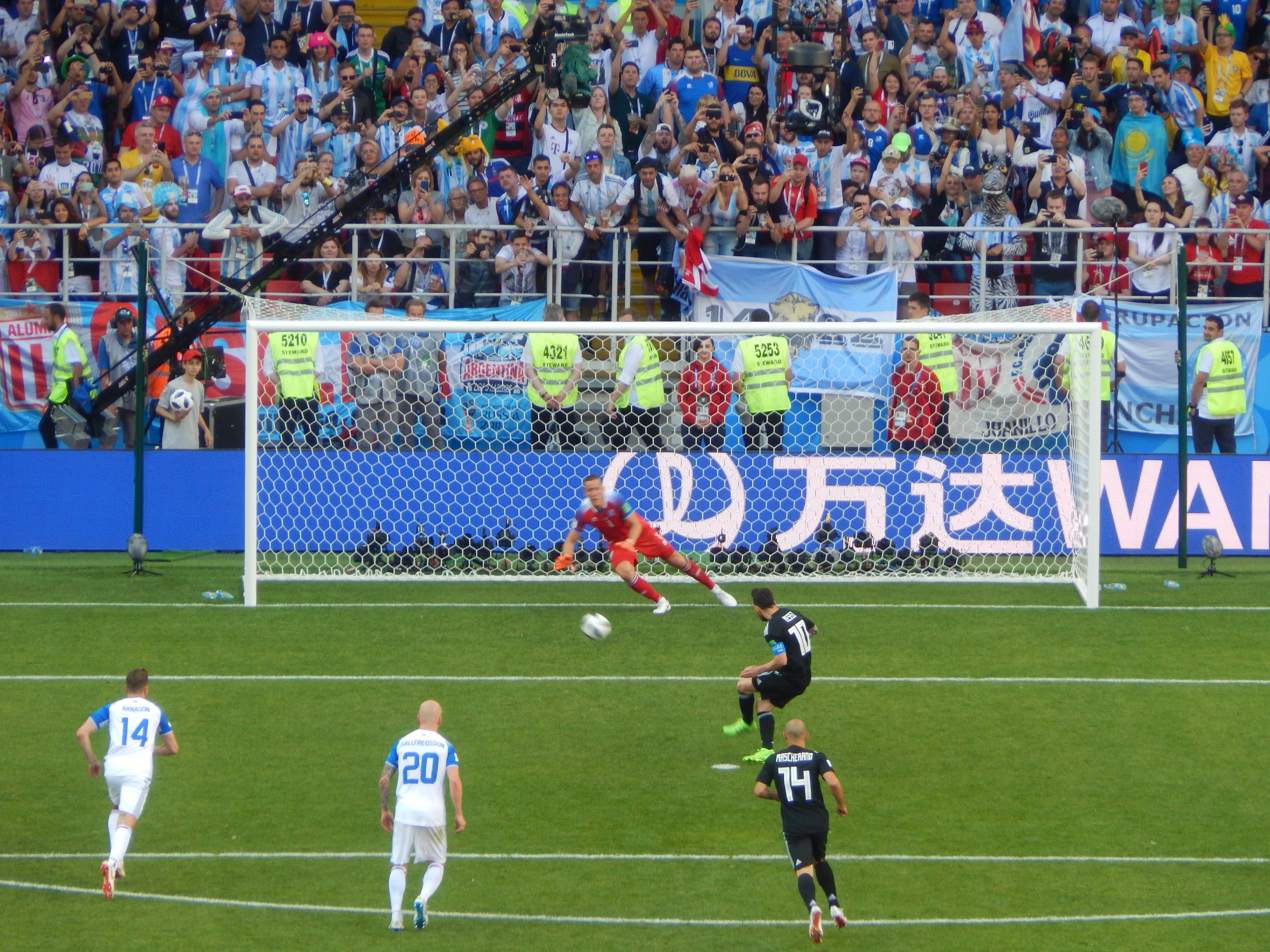
Hannes saving Lionel Messi's penalty at the FIFA World Cup 2018

Hannes made his international debut for Iceland in 2011, keeping a clean sheet in a Euro 2012 qualifier against Cyprus. After appearing in all 12 2014 World Cup qualifiers for Iceland, he cemented his first-choice status.

Hannes was selected for Euro 2016, Iceland's first ever appearance in a major international football tournament. He made his first UEFA European Championship appearance in matchday 1 of Group F versus Portugal which ended in a 1–1 draw. Iceland eventually reached the knockout phase after finishing runner-up behind Hungary.

In May 2018, he was named in Iceland's 23-man squad for the 2018 World Cup in Russia. On 16 June 2018, Hannes saved a penalty kick from Argentina's Lionel Messi in Iceland's first World Cup match, which ended in a 1–1 draw and Hannes being named man of the match.

On 8 September 2021, Hannes announced his retirement from the national team after his 77th match.

== Personal life ==
Hannes has worked as a film director when not playing football. He directed, amongst other things, Iceland's video for their entry to the 2012 Eurovision Song Contest. His employer before leaving to Norway to become a fully professional footballer, Sagafilm, has promised him his job back when he returns to Iceland after his expatriate footballing career.

Hannes directed a 2018 World Cup advertisement for Coca-Cola, and his directional film debut Cop Secret. In 2022, he directed an UEFA Women's Euro 2022 advertisement for N1, featuring Glódís Perla Viggósdóttir.

== Career statistics ==
=== International ===
As of match played 8 September 2021

Appearances and goals by national team and year
National team	Year	Apps	Goals
Iceland	2011	1	0
Iceland	2012	8	0
Iceland	2013	9	0
Iceland	2014	7	0
Iceland	2015	6	0
Iceland	2016	10	0
Iceland	2017	7	0
Iceland	2018	9	0
Iceland	2019	10	0
Iceland	2020	7	0
Iceland	2021	3	0
Total		77	0
