= Singapore Sling (band) =

Icelandic rock band

- Origin: Reykjavík, Iceland
- Genres: Shoegaze; alternative rock; psychedelia; rock and roll
- Years active: 2000–present
- Labels: Hitt; Stinky; Sheptone; 12 Tónar; 8mm Musik; Outlier; Fuzz Club
- Members: Henrik Björnsson; Einar Þór Kristjánsson; Ester Bíbí Ásgeirsdóttir; Björn Viktorsson
- Past members: Sigurður Magnús Finnsson (Siggi Shaker); Bjarni Friðrik Jóhannsson; Þorgeir Guðmundsson; Helgi Örn Pétursson; Hákon Aðalsteinsson; Hallberg Daði Hallbergsson; Alex Hancock
- Website: www.facebook.com/Singapore-Sling-34742149719/

Singapore Sling is an Icelandic rock band from Reykjavík, formed in 2000. The band has released eleven studio albums to date.

== History ==
Singapore Sling was formed in spring 2000 in Reykjavík, Iceland, by singer, songwriter and guitarist Henrik Björnsson, aided by his friend, guitarist Einar Þór Kristjánsson. Björnsson had some 8-track demos and wanted to create a band. One of these demos was "Overdrive", which surfaced online on the Iceland Airwaves 2001 official website, and later became "Overdriver", the opening track on their first studio album.

Despite Björnsson's job as a bartender, the band's name did not come from the Singapore Sling cocktail but from a 1990 art film, Singapore Sling, by the Greek director Nikos Nikolaidis.

In a June 2003 interview with VRT Radio 1, Björnsson said,

We had a first gig. It was booked and we didn't have a name and I had been looking for a film called Singapore Sling for a long time. I couldn't find it anywhere. It sounded cool, so that became the name of the band. It's some kind of dark, perverse Greek film from 1990. I haven't found it yet, so if you know someone who has it, please let me know. I hope it's good. A dark perverse noir film and a guy who has sex with a corpse. And he's called Singapore Sling.

The band evolved to a sextet with changing lineups performing at Iceland Airwaves, Reykjavík's main music festival, before obtaining a record deal with a local label, Hitt Records, in 2002. The lineup at that time was Björnsson on vocals, guitar and keyboards, Kristjánsson on guitar, Þorgeir Guðmundsson on bass guitar, Helgi Örn Pétursson on guitar and keyboards, Bjarni Friðrik Jóhannsson on drums, and Sigurður Magnús Finnsson (aka Siggi Shaker, aka Iggi Sniff) on tambourine and maracas.

Singapore Sling released its first album, The Curse of Singapore Sling, in August 2002. Following the release, the band performed at the Iceland Airwaves 2002 music festival.

The album was licensed by the New York independent record label Stinky Records for a North American release in 2003. "Why this record is being released in America is because a guy came here on a festival and then he let some people hear it in America," explained Björnsson. Kristjánssonn added, "The whole idea of the Airwaves Festival is like a festival for Icelandic bands to export or be spotted. Iceland is so isolated and they have this festival. Icelandair sponsors it and they give flights and stuff like that to journalists and label people so they can come and see us. The whole festival is sponsored by Icelandair and the government to get Icelandic music to be heard outside of Iceland." The band toured the United States and Canada in summer 2003.

Although their home label Edda left the music business and shut its branch Hitt Records, Singapore Sling released its second record, Life Is Killing My Rock 'N' Roll, in Iceland on Sheptone Records, and in the United States on Stinky, promoted by an American support slot on a tour.

Sheptone released the band's third album, Taste the Blood of Singapore Sling, in 2005. For this album, Björnsson, Kristjánsson and Finnsson were joined by guitarist Hákon Aðalsteinsson, bassist Ester Bíbí Ásgeirsdóttir and drummer Björn Viktorsson. Although it was distributed in Denmark by the Reykjavik- and Copenhagen-based independent label 12 Tónar, Taste the Blood of Singapore Sling was not licensed for release in the United States. That same year, Singapore Sling appeared in Screaming Masterpiece, a documentary film about the Icelandic music scene.

Aðalsteinsson left to form The Third Sound, who later participated in Björnsson's now-defunct Vebeth collective of Icelandic music artists.

In 2006, the German label Play Loud! Music released a 2-disc compilation album, Silver Monk Time, as a tribute to The Monks. Singapore Sling provided a cover version of the track "I Hate You", recorded specially for the project and mastered at Faust Studio by Hans-Joachim Irmler from the band Faust.

In 2007, the German label 8mm Muzik issued The Curse, the Life, the Blood, a best-of compilation dedicated to the European market, including four tracks from each of the two first albums and two tracks from the third album. 8mm Muzik managed a European record release tour to promote the album, with venues located in Germany, France, Benelux, Denmark, Austria, Italy and Czech Republic.

Beginning in 2008, Björnsson participated in the band Dead Skeletons. He also formed side project The Go-Go Darkness as a duo with his wife, Elsa María Blöndal, and issued the Dark Heart album in 2009.

Singapore Sling's fourth album, Perversity, Desperation and Death, was released in 2009 by 8mm Muzik. This was followed by the band's fifth, Singapore Sling Must Be Destroyed, in October 2010, issued by Outlier Records.

With "Never Forever" (2011), Singapore Sling began a collaboration with London-based label Fuzz Club Records. The live lineup changed to include bass player Hallberg Daði Hallbergsson.

In 2012, the band played Austin Psych Fest (now renamed Levitation), and by the end of the year, they toured Europe as headliners for Fuzz Club's Reverb Conspiracy Tour, hitting Europe's main capital cities with the Lucid Dream (from the UK) and Wall of Death (from France). Another tour followed in September–October 2013, including an appearance at the second edition of the Liverpool International Festival of Psychedelia.

In February–March 2015, Björnsson worked in his home recording studio on unfinished material from 2012. With the addition of brand-new compositions, it was released as two albums: The Tower of Foronicity (2014) and Psych Fuck (November 2015). His sister, Anna Margrét Björnsson (of Two Step Horror), sang on both albums; she had previously guested on earlier Singapore Sling releases. The latter album featured opener "Dive In", a cover of a song by Icelandic band Quarashi.

The band's ninth studio album, Kill Kill Kill (Songs About Nothing), was released on February 2, 2017, again on Fuzz Club.

== In media ==
The track "Curse Curse Curse" was used in the 2004 TV documentary series Long Way Round, and appeared on the soundtrack CD, released by Virgin Records. The song was also used in the Edda Award-winning short film Smáfuglar (2008).

== Discography ==
Studio albums

- The Curse of Singapore Sling (2002, Hitt Records/Stinky Records)
- Life Is Killing My Rock 'N' Roll (2004 Sheptone Records/Stinky Records)
- Taste the Blood of Singapore Sling (2005, Sheptone Records/12 Tónar)
- Perversity, Desperation and Death (2009, 8mm Muzik)
- Singapore Sling Must Be Destroyed (2010, Outlier Records)
- Never Forever (2011, Fuzz Club Records)
- The Tower of Foronocity (2014, Fuzz Club Records)
- Psych Fuck (2015, Fuzz Club Records)
- Kill Kill Kill (Songs About Nothing) (2017, Fuzz Club Records)
- Killer Classics (2019, Fuzz Club Records)
- Good Sick Fun with Singapore Sling (2020)

Singles

- "Song for the Spirit" (2008, 8mm Muzik)

Compilation albums

- The Curse, the Life, the Blood (2007, 8mm Muzik)

Compilation appearances

- "Curse Curse Curse" on Long Way Round (Music from the TV Series) (2004, Virgin Records)
- "I Hate You" on Silver Monk Time: A Tribute to The Monks (2006 Play Loud! Music)
- "Nothing Inside" on "The Reverb Conspiracy Vol. 1" (2012 Fuzz Club Records)
- "You Drive Me Insane" on "The Reverb Conspiracy Vol. 3" (2014 Fuzz Club Records)

== Personnel ==
While Björnsson is the sole official member, as well as the primary musician on the band's recordings, the live lineup has changed from its original incarnation, and as of November 2015, consists of:

- Henrik Björnsson – vocals, guitar and keyboards
- Einar Þór Kristjánsson – lead guitar
- Ester Bíbí Ásgeirsdóttir – bass guitar
- Björn Viktorsson – drums
