= Cop Secret =

2021 film directed by Hannes Þór Halldórsson

- Leynilögga
- Directed by: Hannes Þór Halldórsson
- Written by: Nína Pedersen; Sverrir Þór Sverrisson; Hannes Þór Halldórsson
- Produced by: Lilja Ósk Snorradóttir
- Starring: Auðunn Blöndal; Egill Einarsson; Björn Hlynur Haraldsson; Steinunn Ólína Þorsteinsdóttir
- Cinematography: Elli Cassata
- Edited by: Guðni Hilmar Halldórsson & Hannes Þór Halldórsson
- Music by: Kristján Sturla Bjarnason
- Production companies: Pegasus; Icelandic Film Centre; Ministry of Industries and Innovation; Sýn
- Distributed by: Samfilm
- Release dates: 10 August 2021 (Locarno); 22 September 2021 (Iceland)
- Running time: 98 minutes
- Country: Iceland
- Language: Icelandic
- Box office: $588,651

Cop Secret (Icelandic: Leynilögga) is a 2021 Icelandic action comedy film directed by Hannes Þór Halldórsson from a screenplay that he co-wrote alongside Nína Pedersen and Sverrir Þór Sverrisson. The film stars Auðunn Blöndal, Egill Einarsson, Björn Hlynur Haraldsson and Steinunn Ólína Þorsteinsdóttir.

The film is based on a fake movie trailer made by Auðunn, Hannes and Sverrir Þór Sverrisson for a TV show in 2011. The trailer featured Gísli Örn Garðarsson, Hjalti Árnason, Ingvar Eggert Sigurðsson, Hörður Magnússon and Hermann Gunnarsson.

The film premièred at the Concorso internazionale at the 74th Locarno Film Festival on 10 August 2021.

== Synopsis ==
A cop (Auðunn Blöndal) in denial of his sexuality, falls in love with his new partner (Egill Einarsson), while investigating a string of bank robberies where nothing seems to have been stolen.

== Plot ==
Böðvar "Bússi" Böðvarsson, a cop who doesn't play by the rules, is partnered with Klemenz, a straight shooter, as they investigate a series of bank robberies in Reykjavík where nothing appears to have been stolen. During the latest robbery, a woman on a motorbike flees the scene, leading Bússi to take chase. Klemenz protests the chase, as he has his son in the back of the car. They chase the woman through the streets of Reykjavík, including through a shopping mall, before she escapes to the nearby town of Garðabær. Lacking the jurisdiction to follow them they stop at the outskirts, where another cop, Hörður Bess, takes up the chase. Bússi follows against protests from Klemenz and they track the woman to an abandoned warehouse. Klemenz is accidentally shot by his partner and the woman escapes.

Bússi and Hörður are both well known, with Bússi brutal in his tactics, while Hörður is a former male model, pansexual, and a millionaire who speaks 15 languages, except for Danish "on principle". The two have built up a strong rivalry for who is the toughest and best cop in Iceland.

After Bússi's chief Þorgerður disciplines him for causing $700 worth of damage during the failed chase, he goes home to his girlfriend Lilja, but they fight due to how distant he has been to her. After she leaves, he momentarily grabs a male model magazine before throwing it away.

In an abandoned factory, Rikki Ferrari is meeting with his gang, including the woman on the motorbike, Stefanía. He only speaks dubbed English to them. Stefanía announces their next target, before one member Svavar, complains about a lack of organisation around the heist. Rikki shoots him through the hand, before asking if there are any more questions.

The next day, Bússi responds to a call about the heist, with Klemenz left behind. He goes into the bank alone, only to discover Hörður already inside. The two easily kill the criminals, as Stefanía uploads a virus to the bank's computer. The two cops momentarily touch hands and share a moment, before the last gang member takes a woman hostage. Bússi shoots the woman in the shoulder, before they both shoot the gang member. Stefanía is captured by local police.

Back at the station, Bússi interrogates her. After punching her, shooting the walls, and breaking her finger, the only information she gives up is a vague warning about the upcoming Iceland vs England women's football match to be held on the upcoming Saturday.

Bússi and Hörður go drinking together and discuss the robberies, before they begin kissing passionately in the bathroom of the bar. Bússi wakes up the next morning alone and after he arrives at work, discovers that Klemenz no longer wishes to be his partner, with his chief Þorgerður having assigned Hörður to be his new partner. Bússi is furious, but the two work together to tail Stefanía who has just been released.

They manage to tail her to an abandoned factory, where Hörður recognises Rikki from his modelling days. Rikki having disappeared years ago after an explosion. Inside the factory, Rikki meets again with his gang, confronting Stefanía and asking if she had snitched on the plan, before telling them that the plan is going ahead, and that their insider is working. Svavar asks his fellow henchman if he should answer him in Icelandic or English, confused as to why Rikki speaks in English. Rikki then threatens to kill him. Stefanía stops him, saying that he can't keep shooting his henchmen before the jobs are complete. On the radio, the disk jockey, Heiðar Austmann, begins talking about the gangs plans, stating that due to the police being busy with the international football game, if he was to commit a heist, he would do it during the game. Rikki is furious and demands them to bring the DJ to him.

The gang bring Heiðar to Rikki, who interrogates him, demanding to know how he knows the plan. The DJ claims to know nothing as he was simply stating the obvious, but Rikki shoots him anyway.

Bússi and Hörður manage to find the gang at their next heist, but the only member they capture is killed when Stefanía detonates an explosive to destroy evidence. Discovering a burnt USB drive in the bag he was holding, the two cops take it to a local hacker Loa. The hacker is able to link it to Chinatown. Bússi enlists his landlord to help them track down the source, but a sniper kills the landlord. Hörður manages to kill the sniper, but also blows up Chinatown in the process. Þorgerður and Prime Minister of Iceland Jon Gnarr are furious at the damage caused.

Bússi breaks up with his girlfriend and finally accepts that he is gay, going to Hörður's house where they consummate their attraction to each other. Unbeknownst to them, Rikki has a man take photographs of them. Rikki then kills the photographer and blackmails Bússi to retire from the force or he will release the photos. Bússi looks for Hörður and discovers that he is meeting with Rikki. Bússi hands in his badge in response.

The football game starts and the entire police force are at the game, where they discover a video from Rikki, threatening to detonate a bomb if the stadium is evacuated or at the final whistle of the game.

Loa discovers that the virus on the USB stick is designed to crash all the security systems throughout Iceland, and informs Bússi. The system is then activated, as Rikki's gang began their heist on the national gold reserves. Svavar continues to complain about the planning of the operation, leading Rikki to kill him. The rest of the gang manage to escape with the gold in a stolen garbage truck. While the police discover the bomb at the stadium.

After a drunken night in Reykjavík, Bússi realises that the football game was the cover and manages to jump onto the back of the garbage truck. Once they arrive at the factory, Bússi locates Hörður, who informs him that Rikki has kidnapped his brother Maggi and is holding him hostage. The two sneak into the factory where they discover Klemenz was the insider. They are then restrained, before Jürgen, a German torturer, is set to work on them. They manage to escape and kill him with his own tools, before fighting their way through the remaining gang members. As they do, Bússi declares his love for Hörður.

Bússi and Rikki fall into a Mexican standoff and are soon joined by Stefanía and Hörður. Klemenz arrives, and stumbles firing off a shot that hits Bússi and causes the rest to scatter. Rikki then fires a shot, but Klemenz dives in front of it, taking the bullet. Stefanía manages to defeat Hörður, but is shot by Maggi. Rikki escapes on a speedboat, but Bùssi fires a grenade at it, blowing it up.

At the football game, the bomb squad is still defusing the bomb, while Sara Björk Gunnarsdóttir is awarded a penalty. The shot goes in, as the bomb is defused with two seconds left. Iceland win the match.

At the factory, Klemenz is arrested and Þorgerður decides to merge the two police departments together, making Bússi and Hörður partners permanently. Stefanía appears, running at the group, but Þorgerður drops the shipping container full of gold on top of her.

Later, Bússi and Hörður are happily living together, raising the child of Bússi's former landlord. A bandaged Rikki is shown waking up in hospital.

== Cast ==
- Auðunn Blöndal as Bússi
- Egill Einarsson as Hörður
- Steinunn Ólína Þorsteinsdóttir as Þorgerður
- Vivian Ólafsdóttir as Stefanía
- Sverrir Þór Sverrisson as Klemenz
- Björn Hlynur Haraldsson as Rikki
- Júlíana Sara Gunnarsdóttir as Lilja
- Birgir Gislason as Maggi
- Gunnar Hansson as Softý
- Rúrik Gíslason as Omar
- Bríet as Lóa
- Jón Jónsson as Halli
- Guðmundur Benediktsson as himself
- Heiðar Austmann as himself
- Jón Gnarr as himself
- Sara Björk Gunnarsdóttir as herself
- Hallbera Guðný Gísladóttir as herself

== Production ==
Principal photography concluded in Iceland in December 2020.

On 19 January 2021 it was announced that the Hannes Þór Halldórsson directional debut film Cop Secret would be presented on the Nordic Film Market on 5 February 2021.

== Release ==
The film premièred in the Concorso internazionale at the 74th Locarno Film Festival on 21 August 2021. It was first theatrically released in Island on 22 October 2021, while its release on VOD was in the U.K. and Ireland on 23 May 2022 by Vertigo Releasing, and in North America on 12 July 2022. It was screened at the Brussels International Fantastic Film Festival on 6 September 2022.

== Reception ==
=== Box office ===
Cop Secret grossed 76 million ISK (about $588,651) only in Iceland in 2021, coming in second in the box office behind No Time to Die.

=== Critical response ===
On review aggregator Rotten Tomatoes, the film holds an approval rating of 84% based on 19 reviews, with an average rating of 6.5/10.

Jay Weissberg of Variety said of the film: "Entertaining? Yes, by and large. Clever? Not by a long shot." Gunnar Ragnarsson of RÚV criticized the film, stating that he film's action and endless pop culture references get tired after a while and that lead actor Auðunn Blöndal did not yet have the ability to carry a film. In her review for Eye for Film, Jane Fae remembers that the film explicitly mentions Die Hard 3.
