= Halla Vilhjálmsdóttir =

Icelandic television, film actress and singer

- Born: Halla Vilhjálmsdóttir; 30 January 1982 (age 44); Reykjavík, Iceland
- Other names: Hatla Williams; Halla Williams; Halla Koppel
- Education: Guildford School of Acting
- Years active: 2002–present
- Website: www.hallawilliams.com

Halla Vilhjálmsdóttir (born 30 January 1982) is an Icelandic television, film actress, and singer.

== Biography ==
Halla graduated in 2004 from the Guildford School of Acting in Guildford, Surrey, she worked in this time for ITV and the BBC.

=== Movie career ===
In 2002, Halla earned a role in the Icelandic drama film Gemsar, and starred in her first lead role in the 2006 comedy film Áramótaskaup. One year later, she portrayed Beta in Icelandic fantasy comedy film Astrópía. In 2009 she earned her first international role, playing a prisoner in the British mystery thriller film Ghost Machine under the pseudonym Hatla Williams.

=== Television career ===
Halla hosted the 2006 Icelandic version of The X Factor. In 2008, she played one of the lead roles in the Icelandic Crime television series Mannaveiðar. She has played various roles in TV comedies and sitcoms.

=== Stage career ===
She played the lead role in the Threepenny Opera at the Icelandic National Theatre, and the lead role of Arial in Footloose, among others.

=== Mountaineering career ===
Halla has summited four of the Seven Summits - Aconcagua 6,960m, Mount Elbrus 5,642m, Kilimanjaro 5,895m and Mount Vinson 4,892m.

=== Music career ===
The Soprano singer performed the song Roses in the fourth Semi-Final of the Iceland preliminaries for the Eurovision Song Contest 2009. Halla is the female lead singer of the Icelandic Pop band Villimadur.

== Personal life ==
In 2007, she was briefly in a relationship with Hollywood star Jude Law.

In 2014, she married Colombian banker Harry Koppel in Bogota; they have one daughter (Louisa Koppel) born on 23 September 2015.

In 2015, she started an MBA at the University of Oxford with a GMAT score above 700.

=== Dubbing ===
- 101 dalmatians – Rolly
- Cinderella – Suzy
- The Lion King 2: Simba's Pride – Vitani
- Pinocchio – Dutch Puppet, French Puppet, and Russian Puppet
- The Jungle Book – Shanti
- The Little Mermaid 2: Return to the Sea – Melody

== Filmography ==
Year	Film	Credited as		
Year	Film	Actor	Host	Role
2002	Gemsar	Yes	No	Kristin
2006	Áramótaskaup 2006	Yes	No	
2006	The X Factor	No	Yes	
2006	Venni Páer	Yes	No	Lilja
2007	Astrópía	Yes	No	Beta
2008	Mannaveiðar	Yes	No	(Television series)
2009	Ghost Machine	Yes	No	Prisoner K (as Hatla Williams)
2009	The Making of 'Ghost Machine	Yes	No	Herself
