= Mugimama Is This Monkey Music? =

Studio album by Mugison
- Released: 2004
- Length: 43:37
- Label: 12 Tónar
- Producer: Mugison

Mugison chronology
Niceland (2004)	Mugimama Is This Monkey Music? (2004)	Little Trip (2005)

Professional ratings
Review scores
Source	Rating
AllMusic	link
Pitchfork	(7.1/10) link

Mugimama Is This Monkey Music? is an album by Mugison, released in 2004. The name of the song "What I Would Say in Your Funeral" has been misspelled at the back of the cover as "What I Would Say in Your Funiral".

== Track listing ==
1. "I Want You" - 3:53
2. "The Chicken Song" - 3:04
3. "Never Give Up" - 0:50
4. "2 Birds" - 5:06
5. "What I Would Say In Your Funeral" - 3:53
6. "Sad as a Truck" - 3:16
7. "Swing Ding" - 0:28
8. "I'd Ask" 2:48
9. "Murr Murr" - 2:52
10. "Salt" - 3:50
11. "Hold on to Happiness" - 4:30
12. "Afi minn" - 9:07

== Charts ==
Chart (2005)	Peak position
Icelandic Albums (Tónlist)	1
