= Diddú =

Icelandic soprano and songwriter

Sigrún Hjálmtýsdóttir (pronounced [ˈsɪɣrun ˈçaulmtʰi(ː)sˌtouʰtɪr̥]; born 8 August 1955), better known as Diddú (pronounced [ˈtɪtːu]), is an Icelandic soprano and songwriter. Educated at the Reykjavík College of Music and the Guildhall School of Music and Drama in London, she began her singing career in the 1970s as a vocalist for the popular folk and pop group Spilverk Þjóðanna. She subsequently turned to classical music, particularly Lieder and operas.

Diddú's most recent album, Hvert Örstutt Spor (Each Tiny Step), was released in 2005.

== Early life and education ==
The second of seven children of Hjálmtýr E. Hjálmtýsson, a bank clerk, and Margrét Matthíasdóttir, a writer, Diddú was born on 8 August 1955 and raised in Reykjavík. She studied at the Reykjavík College of Music, and afterwards at the Guildhall School of Music and Drama in London where she received a degree (1979–1984) and a postgraduate diploma (1985). She also had private singing lessons in Italy between 1987 and 1988.

== Career ==
Diddú began her singing career as a vocalist with the folk and pop group Spilverk þjóðanna between 1975 and 1978 and made numerous recordings of folk and popular music, before turning her focus to classical music, particularly Lieder and operas. With the Icelandic Opera she has performed the parts of Susanna in The Marriage of Figaro, Gilda in Rigoletto, Papagena and the Queen of the Night in The Magic Flute, Lucia in Lucia di Lammermoor, Violetta in La traviata, Adina in L'elisir d'amore and Rosalinda in Die Fledermaus. She was a guest singer as Susanna in The Marriage of Figaro in Trondheim, Norway, and as Gilda in Rigoletto in Gothenburg, Sweden (1992). She has also sung the role of Olympia in Les contes d'Hoffmann at the National Theatre of Iceland in Reykjavík.

In 1994, Diddú appeared in Bíódagar (Movie Days) by Icelandic film director Friðrik Þór Friðriksson, playing the mother of a young boy living in the 1950s who is engrossed with American movies.

In 2001, Diddú performed at a special concert in Beijing, China, in the Forbidden City Concert Hall. The concert was held to commemorate 30 years of relations between Iceland and China.

On 26 September 2007, Diddú was a special guest of Garðar Thór Cortes at a concert at the Barbican Centre in London with the National Symphony Orchestra conducted by Cortes's father, Garðar Cortes. She performed "Il Bacio" ("The Kiss"), "Mein Herr Marquis" from Johann Strauss II's Die Fledermaus, the cavatina "Casta diva" from Bellini's Norma, and "É strano... sempre libera" from Verdi's La traviata; and sang in duet with Garðar Thór Cortes in "O soave fanciulla" from Puccini's La bohème, in a duet from act 1, scene 5, of Verdi's Rigoletto, and in "The Prayer" by Carole Bayer Sager.

Diddú worked frequently with the pianist Anna Guðný Guðmundsdóttir, ever since their student years at Guildhall in London. They gave countless concerts together, and in 2002 celebrated 20 years of collaboration with a concert in the Salurinn Concert Hall, including works by Olivier Messiaen, Richard Strauss, Thea Musgrave, and Frank Bridge.

== Personal life ==
Diddú's husband is musician Þorkell Jóelsson (born 28 May 1952). Her father, Hjálmtýr E. Hjálmtýsson (5 July 1933 – 12 September 2002), had roles in the Icelandic comedies Með allt á hreinu (On Top, 1982), Löggulíf (A Policeman's Life, 1985) and Karlakórinn Hekla (The Men's Choir, 1992). Diddú's youngest brother, Páll Óskar Hjálmtýsson, is a pop singer, songwriter and disc jockey.

== Selected works ==
Year	Production	Role
1992	Rigoletto (Verdi) Gothenburg, Sweden	Gilda
2006	Le Pays (1912) (Guy Ropartz) Reykjavík Arts Festival 2006, Reykjavík Art Museum, Reykjavík	
[unknown]	Les contes d'Hoffmann (Offenbach) National Theatre of Iceland, Reykjavík	Olympia
[unknown]	L'elisir d'amore (Donizetti)	Adina
[unknown]	Die Fledermaus (Johann Strauss II)	Rosalinda
[unknown]	Lucia di Lammermoor (Donizetti)	Lucia
[unknown]	The Magic Flute (Mozart)	Papagena/The Queen of the Night
[unknown]	The Marriage of Figaro (Mozart)	Susanna
[unknown]	La traviata (Verdi)	Violetta Valery

== Discography ==
- Sigrún Hjálmtýsdóttir Sópran (1992)
- Töfrar (Magic, 1994)
- Jólastjarna (Christmas Star, 1997)
- Klassík (Classical, 1998)
- Ljós Og Skuggar (Light and Shadows, 2000)
- Óskastund (A Moment for a Wish, 2001)
- Fuglar Tímans (Birds of Time, 2003)
- Hvert Örstutt Spor (Each Tiny Step, 2005)

== Sources ==
- "Sigrun Hjalmtysdottir". Barnaskoli Vestmannaeyja. Archived from the original on 20 October 2007.
- Diddú at 12 Tónar. Retrieved 30 October 2007.
