= Elínborg Halldórsdóttir =

Icelandic rock musician, and painter (born 1962)

Elínborg Halldórsdóttir (born 1962) is an Icelandic rock musician, and painter. She was a member of the band Q4U. She was also judge in the first ever series of the Icelandic version of The X Factor in 2006–2007, on Stöð 2.
