= Paul Oscar =

Icelandic singer-songwriter (born 1970)

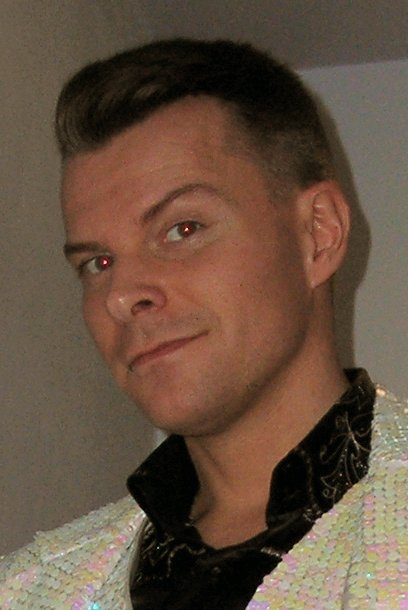
- Paul Oscar in London on 25 April 2008

Background information
- Also known as: Paul Oscar
- Born: Páll Óskar Hjálmtýsson; 16 March 1970 (age 56); Reykjavík, Iceland
- Genre: Pop
- Occupations: Singer; songwriter; disc jockey
- Years active: 1993–present
- Label: Paul Oscar Productions (P.O.P.)

Páll Óskar Hjálmtýsson (born 16 March 1970), known internationally as Páll Óskar and Paul Oscar, is an Icelandic pop singer, songwriter and disc jockey. He had a musical childhood, singing at private functions, with choirs and for media advertisements, but was affected by bullying in school and tension between his parents at home.

Paul Oscar's musical range spans traditional Icelandic songs, ballads, love songs, disco, house and techno. He released his first album, Stuð (Groove), in 1993 while in New York City, and also sang with Icelandic groups Milljónamæringarnir (The Millionaires) and Casino while establishing a career as a solo artiste. His album of ballads, Palli, was the best-selling Icelandic album of 1995. Paul Oscar came to international attention when he performed "Minn hinsti dans" ("My Final Dance"), Iceland's entry for the Eurovision Song Contest 1997. His most recent album is Silfursafnið (The Silver Collection, 2008). In Reykjavík, Paul Oscar performs regularly as a disc jockey in clubs and appears on radio and TV shows.

== Early life ==
The youngest of seven children of Hjálmtýr E. Hjálmtýsson, a bank clerk, and Margrét Matthíasdóttir, a writer, Paul Oscar was born on 16 March 1970 in Reykjavík. As a child he displayed artistic talent in drawing, writing fairy tales and singing – his mother had him sing for the women in her sewing club and at family birthday parties. He also spent much time singing in choirs and in media commercials, and recorded his first album at the age of seven. His first leading role in a professional theatre production was at 12 years of age in the musical version of Rubber Tarzan, a popular Danish children's novel by Ole Lund Kirkegaard (1940–1979). His voice broke two weeks after the musical's last performance, and he did not sing for the next few years.

Although Paul Oscar's family encouraged his musical talent, his parents did not get along with each other, and he was bullied by his schoolmates. Paul Oscar recalled: "My nickname was Little Palli, and Palli was chubby, nerdy, someone who never got jokes right, who was afraid of other men." At age 13, he realized that he found men attractive, and came out to his family at 16. "For the first day, there was nice talk of acceptance, though my father did raise his voice. On the second day, and the third, and the fourth, there was this terrible silence. They treated me like an alien." However, his mother was supportive. She said: "If Páll has the talent to fall in love, he should nurture that talent. And he has as much a right to sit down at my table with his partner as anybody else does with their partner."

Paul Oscar rediscovered his voice at the age of 18, singing bass with the Hamrahlíð school choir for two years. In 1990 he won a talent contest for his high school; later that year at the time of his graduation, he played Frank-N-Furter to great success in the school's production of The Rocky Horror Show. Around the same time, he began appearing in drag shows at a notorious Reykjavík nightclub. After the club closed, he became a radio jockey on independent radio station FM 90,9. He also appeared in a film, Svo á jörðu sem á himni (As in Heaven, 1992).

== Professional career ==
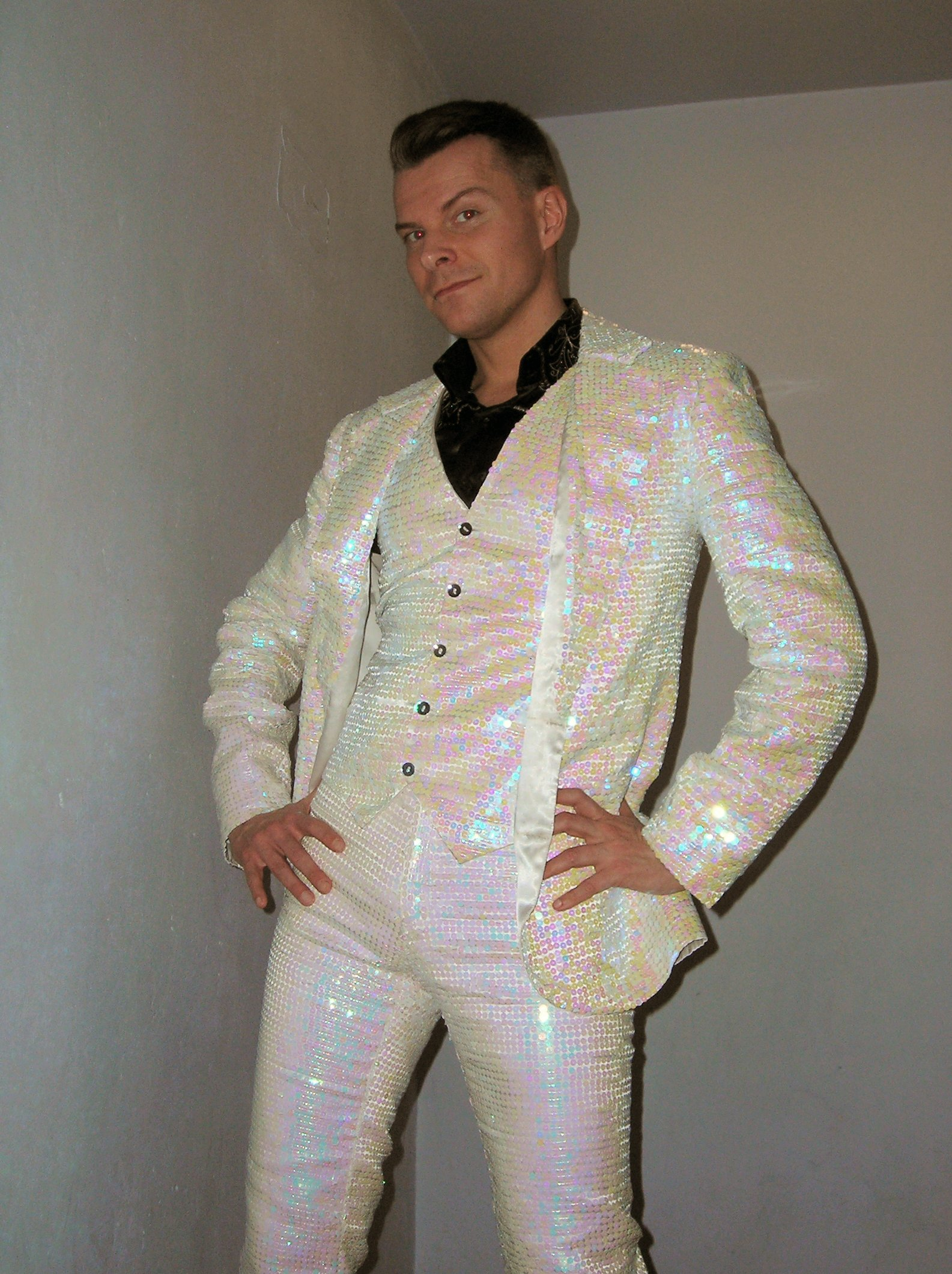
Paul Oscar before appearing on stage at the Eurovision party at the Scala nightclub in London – photographed on 25 April 2008

In the summer of 1993, Paul Oscar left Iceland for New York City, where he met fellow Icelanders Jóhann Jóhannsson and Sigurjón Kjartansson who were then on tour with heavy metal band HAM. They helped him release his first album, Stuð (Groove). In October 1993, Paul Oscar started singing with a band called Milljónamæringarnir (The Millionaires), which released the albums Milljón á mann (A Million for Each, 1994), Allur pakkinn (The Whole Lot, 1999) and Þetta er nú meiri vitleysan (This is Completely Foolish, 2001).

The year 1995 saw Paul Oscar make his début as a solo artist. In that year he formed his own recording company, Paul Oscar Productions (P.O.P.) and released an album of ballads entitled Palli which he personally arranged, performed and produced. It was the best-selling Icelandic album of 1995. This was followed by his album Seif in 1996.

Paul Oscar was Iceland's entrant in the annual Eurovision Song Contest in 1997. He performed the song "Minn hinsti dans" ("My Final Dance"), which he co-wrote, backed by four women dressed in latex playing suggestively on a sofa behind him. Although the song only reached 20th place in a field of 25, the daring presentation attracted wide attention, especially amongst gay audiences, and made him known internationally. In 1998 he was invited to appear in A Song for Eurotrash, a one-off special of the British Channel 4 TV series Eurotrash that was based on the Eurovision Song Contest. He also presented a musical feature Popp i Reykjavík (Pop in Reykjavík).

Paul Oscar worked with easy-listening group Casino on their album Stereo (1998). He followed this with three albums: the English-language album Deep Inside (1999); and two collaborations with harpist Monika Abendroth, Ef ég sofna ekki (If I Won't Sleep Tonight, 2001) and Ljósin heima (The Lights at Home, 2003) (his sister Sigrún Hjálmtýsdóttir (Diddú) also appeared on the latter album). His musical range spans traditional Icelandic songs, ballads, love songs in the style of Burt Bacharach, disco, house and techno.

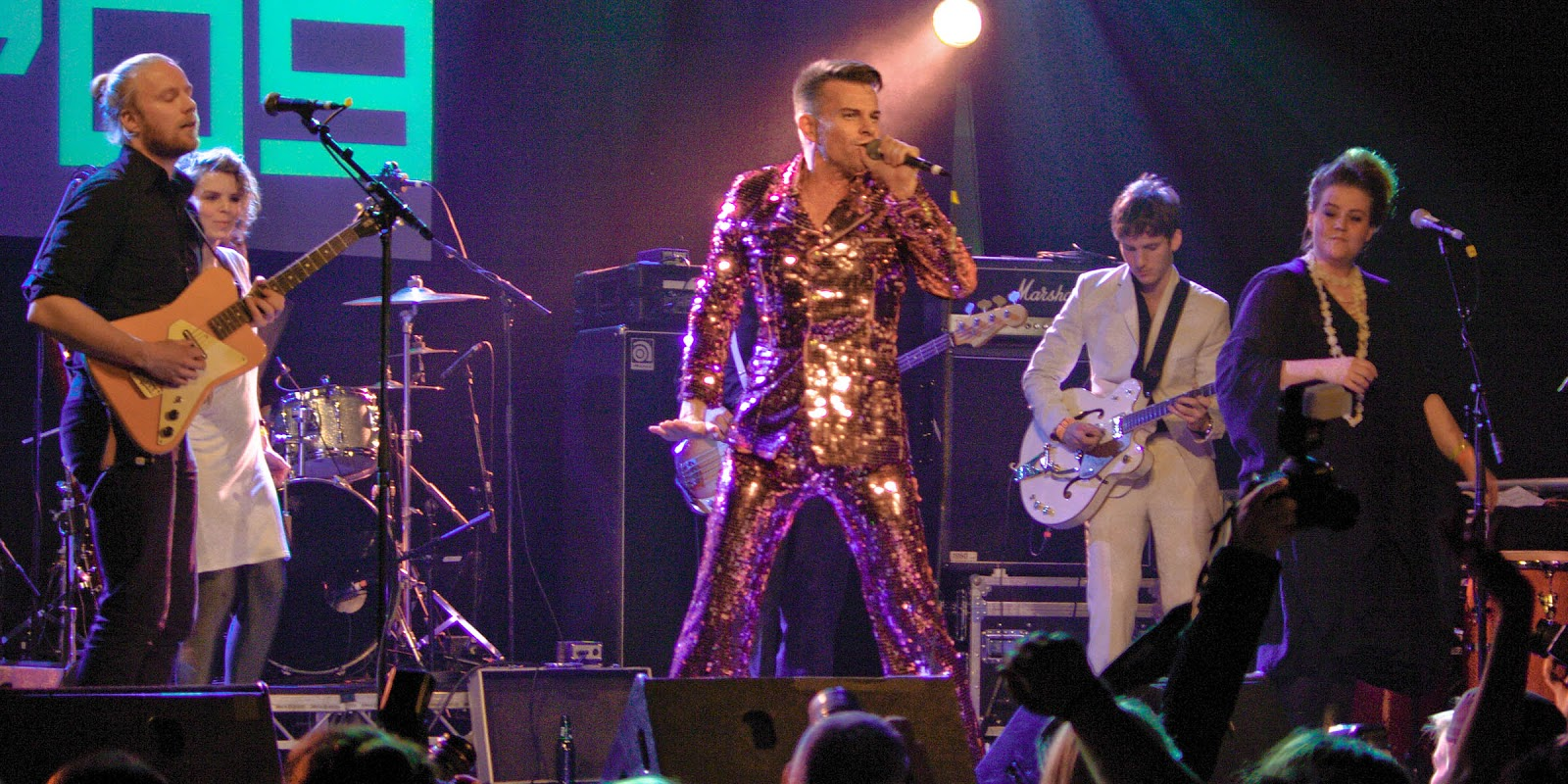
Páll with Hjaltalín, Iceland Airwaves, 2009

At home in Reykjavík, Paul Oscar performs regularly as a disc jockey in clubs and appears on radio and TV shows. He was a judge in the third season of Idol stjörnuleit (Idol Starsearch, 2005), Iceland's version of the UK reality TV series Pop Idol; and in The X Factor (2006), also modelled on the UK's The X Factor. In 2002 he appeared as Dr. Love in the teenage movie Gemsar (Made in Iceland). In 2018 he starred in the Borgarleikhúsið production of Rocky Horror Show that set attendance records.

Paul Oscar has said he realizes that "as a working place Iceland will be too small for me. Actually, it already is. But I am an Icelander. I will always keep a home here. My roots are so valuable to me. I wouldn't change them for a sack of gold."

== Personal life ==
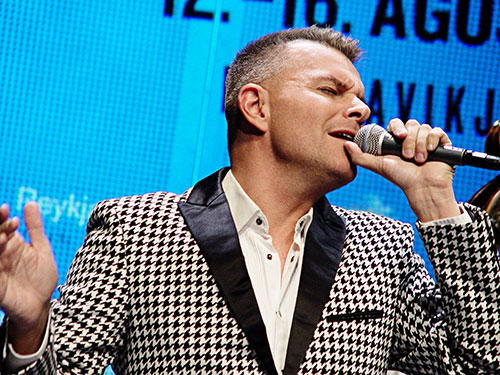
Paul Oscar at Reykjavík Jazz Festival (2015)

Regarding his personal life, Paul Oscar has said: "I have a lot of work still to do. I have had three relationships that, from the outside, looked picture perfect, I suppose. But they were actually quite rotten, false, and abusive to me. What I am doing now is learning to fall in love with myself." He married his fiancé, Edgar Antonio Lucena Angarita, in March 2024 and is a strong advocate for LGBT+ rights on his social media.

He has a reputation for being brash, even rude, when it comes to discussing gay concerns, especially gay sex. Matthías Matthíasson, Director of Samtökin '78, Iceland's gay and lesbian rights group, has commented: "He says things I could never say. But he is an exquisite addition to the gay voice in Iceland." As a gay activist, Paul Oscar helped to organize a Gay Pride Festival in Reykjavík in 2005.

Paul Oscar's father Hjálmtýr E. Hjálmtýsson (5 July 1933 – 12 September 2002), with whom he had a difficult relationship, had roles in the Icelandic comedies Með allt á hreinu (On Top, 1982), Löggulíf (A Policeman's Life, 1985), and Karlakórinn Hekla (The Men's Choir, 1992). His older sister, Sigrún Hjálmtýsdóttir (Diddú), is an opera singer.

== Controversies ==
=== Israel boycott ===
Paul Oscar was a supporter of boycotting the Eurovision Song Contest 2019, due to it being held in Israel. Speaking of the issue on Icelandic radio station Rás 1 on 5 February, he made remarks about Jewish people infiltrating European countries and thus making it hard for them to condemn Israeli policies:

“The reason why the rest of Europe has been virtually silent is that Jews have woven themselves into the fabric of Europe in a very sly way for a very long time. It is not at all hip and cool to be pro-Palestine in Britain,” he said, saying at the interview’s conclusion: “The tragedy is that Jews learned nothing from the Holocaust. Instead, they have taken up the exact same policy of their worst enemy.”

He later apologized and retracted his statement.

“I made judgements and generalisations about Jewish people. … I take full responsibility for these words, take back my remarks about Jewish people, they are wrong and hurtful. I will take responsibility in actions, from this point forward, and will never again speak ill of the Jewish people, wherever in the world they may live.”

He supported RÚV's (Iceland's public broadcaster) decision to boycott the Eurovision Song Contest 2026 due to Israel's participation.

== Selected discography ==
=== Albums ===
- Stuð (Groove, 1993)
- Palli (1995)
- Seif (1996)
- Deep Inside (1999)
- Ef ég sofna ekki (If I Won't Sleep Tonight, 2001) (in collaboration with harpist Monika Abendroth)
- Ljósin heima (The Lights at Home, 2003) (with Monika Abendroth and Sigrún Hjálmtýsdóttir (Diddú))
- Allt fyrir ástina (All in the Name of Love, 2007)
- Silfursafnið (The Silver Collection, 2008)
- Páll Óskar - Box (6 plötur fyrir 1) (compilation, six albums in one, 2014)
- Kristalsplatan (2017)
- Alveg (2025)

=== Singles ===
- "Minn hinsti dans" (My Final Dance, 1997) (Iceland's Eurovision Song Contest 1997 entry)
- "Allt fyrir ástina" (All in the Name of Love, 2007)
- "International" (2007)
- "Betra Lif" (2007)
- "Er þetta ást?" (2008)
- "Þú komst við hjartað í mér" (2008)
- "Sama hvar þú ert" (2008)
- "Gordjöss á esperantó" (in Esperanto, 2010)
- "La Dolce Vita" (2011)
- "Ást sem endist" (2015)

== See also ==
- List of Icelandic writers

== Notes ==
Preceded by Anna Mjöll with "Sjúbídú"	Iceland in the Eurovision Song Contest; 1997	Succeeded by Selma with "All Out of Luck"
