= Kitchen Motors =

Icelandic record label and art collective

Kitchen Motors is an Iceland based think tank, record label and an art collective specializing in instigating collaborations and putting on concerts, exhibitions, performances, chamber operas, producing films, books and radio shows.

Kitchen Motors is known for producing collaborations between artists from different disciplines and in finding common ground where artists from often very diverse backgrounds can work together.

The founders and main architects are Kristín Björk Kristjánsdóttir, Jóhann Jóhannsson and Hilmar Jensson.

== CD releases ==
- Nart Nibbles 1999 - Apparat Organ Quartet, Helvítis Guitar Symphony, Músíkvatur & Múm and more.
- Motorlab #1 2000 - Hilmar Jensson, Ulfar Haraldsson & CAPUT, Stilluppsteypa & Magnús Pálsson, Telefónía directed by Curver.
- Motorlab #2 2001 - Apparat Organ Quartet & TF3IRA, Múm, Asa Juniusdottir & Sjón, Big Band Brutal.
- Motorlab #3 (2001) - Barry Adamson vs. Pan Sonic, The Hafler Trio.
- H u g g u n - Kippi Kaninus (2002).
- Nói Albínói - Slowblow & Sigriđur Níelsdóttir (2003).
- Kitchen Motors Family Album/Fjölskyldualbúm Tilraunaeldhússins (2006, Kitchen Motors/12 Tónar) - A Compilation of Icelandic music.

== See also ==
- List of record labels
