= Atli Heimir Sveinsson =

Icelandic composer (1938–2019)

Atli Heimir Sveinsson (21 September 1938 – 20 April 2019) was an Icelandic composer.

Atli Heimir was born in Reykjavík, Iceland and started piano lessons at the age of 10. He studied piano with Rögnvaldur Sigurjónsson at the Reykjavík College of Music and took his diploma in 1957. He went on to study at the State Academy in Cologne, Germany, from 1959, studying composition with Günter Raphael and Rudolf Petzold, instrumentation with Bernd Alois Zimmermann, conducting with Wolfgang von der Nahmer and piano with Hermann Pillney and Hans Otto Schmidt. He also took private lessons with Gottfried Michael Koenig. He took his diploma in composition and theory in 1963, a year in which he also attended summer courses in Darmstadt, making the acquaintance of Olivier Messiaen, Pierre Boulez, György Ligeti and Bruno Maderna. In 1964 he studied with Karlheinz Stockhausen, Henri Pousseur, Christoph Caskel and Frederic Rzewski. In 1965 he went to the Netherlands and studied electronic music with Gottfried Michael Koenig in Bilthoven.

He was president of the Icelandic Composers Association from 1972 to 1983. In 1976 he received the Nordic Council Music Prize for his Flute Concerto, which was written for and premiered by the Canadian virtuoso Robert Aitken. From 1992 until his death, Atli Heimir Sveinsson received an honorary salary from the Icelandic Parliament. Atli Heimir was elected a member of the Royal Swedish Academy of Music in 1993. His Symphony no. 2 premiered in Reykjavík on 1 June 2006.

Although he was a remarkably versatile composer, Atli Heimir Sveinsson was a devoted modernist and his works often have an experimental character. He was the first Icelandic composer to be influenced by composers such as Stockhausen and John Cage, and, in Iceland, his early works were received with ridicule. He was also responsible for the concert in Iceland, in May 1965, of the artists Nam June Paik and Charlotte Moorman, which was considered a major scandal. In later years, not least through his incidental music including for the children's play Dimmalimm (1970), Ofvitinn (1979) and Sjálfstætt fólk (2000), and his Schubert-colored Jónasarlög to poems by Romantic poet Jónas Hallgrímsson, Sveinsson was generally accepted as one of Iceland's greatest composers of his generation.

Atli Heimir Sveinsson was married to Sif Sigurðardóttir, who died in 2018, and had two sons. On 21 April 2019, Iceland's national public broadcasting service RÚV reported Atli Heimir's death. He was buried in Flatey, Breiðafjörður.

== Selected works ==
Atli Heimir has a varied list of works to his credit including operas, ballet and major orchestral works which are widely performed, including:

- nine solo concertos
- numerous orchestral, chamber and solo works
- an orchestral song cycle to Steinn Steinarr's poem Time and Water
- operas The Silk Drum, Vikivaki TV opera, Moonlight Island and Hertervig
- six symphonies
- Cathexis for viola and piano (1977–1978)
- Dúó Rapp for viola and double bass (2004)
- Könnun (Exploration) for viola and orchestra (1971)
- Minning II (Manuela in Memoriam) for bass flute, viola and harp (2006)
- Þrjú sönglög (3 Songs) for low voice, viola and piano (2000)
- Sonata for viola solo (2002)
- Sonata for viola and piano (2011)
- Springsongs I-IV and Minning (Manuela in Memoriam) for flute, viola and harp (2006)

A complete list of works is available at the composer's website.

== Selected recordings ==
- Haustmyndir (Autumn Pictures), Madrigaletto, Heilræði. On Kveðið í bjargi: Icelandic Choral Music. Hamrahlíðarkórinn, cond. Þorgerður Ingólfsdóttir. Iceland Music Information Center, 1988.
- Atli Heimir Sveinsson: Portrait. Könnun, Flute Concerto, Jubilus II. Robert Aitken, Ingvar Jónasson, Oddur Björnsson, Iceland Symphony Orchestra. Iceland Music Information Center, 1993.
- 21 Music Minutes. Icelandic Flute Music. Martial Nardeau, flute. Iceland Music Information Center, 1993.
- Jónasarlög. Signý Sæmundsdóttir, soprano, and ensemble. Mál og menning, 1997.
- Tíminn og vatnið (Time and Water). Marta G. Halldórsdóttir, Bergþór Pálsson, Sverrir Guðjónsson, Reykjavík Chamber Orchestra, cond. Paul Zukofsky. CPO, 2000.
- Á gleðistundu. Concerto serpentinada, Erjur, Órar, Ryskingar, Á gleðistundu. Anna Guðný Guðmundsdóttir, piano; Reykjavík Chamber Orchestra. Iceland Music Information Center, 2002.
- Tónamínútur: Complete flute works. Áshildur Haraldsdóttir, flute, Atli Heimir Sveinsson and Anna Guðný Guðmundsdóttir, piano. Smekkleysa, 2006.
- Íslands minni - A Toast to Iceland (Songs). Hulda Björk Garðarsdóttir, Eyjólfur Eyjólfsson and ensemble. Iceland Music Information Center, 2007.
- Piano Trios. Hyperion Trio. CPO, 2010.
- Songs from Sjálfstætt fólk. On Í ást sólar: Icelandic Songs. Hallveig Rúnarsdóttir, soprano; Árni Heimir Ingólfsson, piano. Smekkleysa, 2014.
- I Call It, Songs to Polish Poems, Piano Quintet. Reykjavík Chamber Orchestra. Smekkleysa, 2016.
- Óður steinsins. Jónas Ingimundarson, piano. Ríkisútvarpið/Alda Music, 2021.
- Complete String Quartets. Siggi String Quartet, 2023.
- Songs. Guðrún Jóhanna Ólafsdóttir, mezzo-soprano, Francisco Javier Jáuregui, guitar. Abu Music, 2024.
