= Sveppi =

Icelandic film actor and comedian

Sverrir Þór Sverrisson Austfjörð
- Born: 5 August 1977 (age 48); Reykjavík, Iceland
- Other names: Sveppi
- Occupations: Actor; writer; comedian
- Years active: 2001–present

Sverrir Þór Sverrisson (born 5 August 1977), known under his stage name Sveppi, is an Icelandic comedian, actor and writer. He started his career in the TV show 70 mínútur on Popp TV in 2001.

== Early life ==
Sverrir grew up in Breiðholt, Reykjavík. He played handball for Íþróttafélag Reykjavíkur and appeared in a few games in the Icelandic top-tier handball league, Úrvalsdeild karla.

== Filmography ==
- Astrópía (2007) – Flóki
- Asterix at the Olympic Games (2008) - Numérobis (Icelandic dub)
- The Big Rescue (2009) – Sveppi
- The Secret Spell (2010) – Sveppi
- The Magic Wardrobe (2011) – Sveppi
- The Biggest Rescue (2014) – Sveppi
- Amma Hófí (2020)
- Cop Secret (2021) – Klemenz
- Sing 2 (2021) – Jimmy Crystal (Icelandic dub)
- The Bad Guys (2022) - Mr. Snake (Icelandic dub)
- The Bad Guys 2 (2025) - Mr. Snake (Icelandic dub)
