= Pólýfónía =

Studio album by Apparat Organ Quartet
- Released: 9 December 2010
- Recorded: 2007–2010
- Length: 46:25
- Label: 12 Tónar (Iceland); Crunchy Frog Records (elsewhere)
- Producer: Apparat Organ Quartet

Apparat Organ Quartet chronology
Apparat Organ Quartet (2002)	Pólýfónía (2010)

Pólýfónía (Icelandic pronunciation: [ˈpʰouːlifounia]) is the second album by Icelandic band Apparat Organ Quartet, released by the label 12 Tónar on 9 December 2010. A digital version was released on 3 December 2010. The cover was designed by artist Siggi Eggertsson. According to the band, the album is "more accessible and more suited to the musical tastes of the masses". Its working title was at one point Fanfare for the Common Man.

The album is composed almost entirely of new, unreleased material, except for the song "Macht Parat den Apparat", which was featured on the 2003 single for "Romantika". The track "Cargo Frakt" was released as a single on Gogoyoko on November 29, 2010.

== Track listing ==
1. "Babbage" – 4:23
2. "Cargo Frakt" – 4:48
3. "Konami" – 5:22
4. "Pólýnesía" – 4:26
5. "Pentatróník" – 5:26
6. "Macht parat den Apparat" – 5:04
7. "Síríus Alfa" – 5:08
8. "123 Forever" – 5:03
9. "Söngur geimunglingsins" – 6:45
