= Apparat Organ Quartet (album) =

Studio album by Apparat Organ Quartet
- Released: 2002; re-released, remastered 2005
- Recorded: 1999–2002
- Length: 47:32
- Labels: Thule Records; 12 Tónar
- Producer: Apparat Organ Quartet

Apparat Organ Quartet chronology
Apparat Organ Quartet (2002)	Pólýfónía (2009)

Apparat Organ Quartet is the debut album of the Icelandic band Apparat Organ Quartet. It was originally released in 2002 on the Thule Records label in Iceland; in 2005, this self-titled album was re-released on the Icelandic 12 Tónar label in a remastered version. The cover and liner notes contain several paintings of the band members as figures resembling those of Playmobil.

== Track listing ==
1. "Romantika" — 4:44
2. "The Anguish of Space Time" — 6:10
3. "Cruise Control" — 3:38
4. "Ondula Nova" — 5:27
5. "Global Capital" — 5:23
6. "Stereo Rock & Roll" — 4:17
7. "Seremonia" — 5:00
8. "Charlie Tango #2" — 7:24
9. "Sofðu Litla Vél" — 5:29
