= Ghost Machine (film) =

2009 British film by Chris Hartwill

- Directed by: Chris Hartwill
- Written by: Sven Hughes; Malachi Smyth
- Produced by: Simon Bosanquety; Mark Huffam
- Starring: Luke Ford; Rachael Taylor; Sean Faris
- Cinematography: George Richmond
- Edited by: Emma Gaffney; Dayn Williams
- Music by: Bill Grishaw
- Production company: Generator Entertainment
- Distributed by: Anchor Bay Entertainment
- Release date: 1 February 2009
- Running time: 100 minutes
- Country: United Kingdom
- Language: English

Ghost Machine is a 2009 British science fiction film, directed by Chris Hartwill and based on a screenplay by writer Sven Hughes and Malachi Smyth. It stars Rachael Taylor, Sean Faris and Luke Ford.

== Plot ==
The film opens with a tied and hooded woman being taken to some sort of jail run by the British military.

Nine years later, military technicians and video gamers; Tom and Vic perform a training exercise for several candidates for a special force.

They smuggle their top secret, virtual warfare program into a disused prison (as seen before), to experiment with it using two of the candidates.

What should first be a thrill becomes a deadly reality, as a vengeful outsider has manipulated the software and kidnapped them. When their companion Jess hears of this, they begin a seemingly hopeless rescue mission, but is also drawn into this virtual world. A world which can be just as deadly as real warfare.

== Cast ==
- Sean Faris as Tom
- Rachael Taylor as Jess
- Luke Ford as Victor "Vic"
- Jonathan Harden as Benny
- Halla Vilhjálmsdóttir as Prisoner K
- Sam Corry as Iain
- Richard Dormer as Taggert
- Josh Dallas as Bragg

== Production ==
The film was shot in September 2008 in Northern Ireland in the city of Belfast at the Crumlin Road Gaol. It based on a storybook of British screenwriter Sven Hughes.

== Soundtrack ==
The Score was composed by American country artist Bill Grishaw.

== Release ==
Ghost Machine premiered on 1 February 2009 in the United Kingdom and was released in the United States as direct-to-video production on 22 December 2009 over Anchor Bay Entertainment.
