= Lonely Mountain (album) =

Studio album by Mugison
- Released: October 6, 2003
- Genre: Folktronica, pop, rock
- Length: 33:35
- Label: Accidental Records
- Producer: Mugison, Birgir Jón Birgisson

Mugison chronology
Lonely Mountain (2003)	Niceland (2004)

Professional ratings
Review scores
Source	Rating
Uncut	3/5 stars

Lonely Mountain is the debut album by Icelandic artist Mugison, released in 2003 in a hand-stitched limited edition.

== Track listing ==
1. "Sea Y" – 4:00
2. "Ear" – 5:43
3. "One Day She'll Park the Car" – 3:23
4. "I'm on Fire" – 4:02
5. "Pet" – 5:08
6. "Probably" – 2:45
7. "The Night Is Limping" – 3:57
8. "Poke a Pal" – 4:32

== Personnel ==
- Luis Véles – bass on "The Night Is Limping"
- Omutant Moon – lyrics on "Sea Y" and in collaboration with Mugison on "I'm on Fire"
- Pétur Ben – guitar and backing vocals on "Poke a Pal"
- Javier Wayler – drums on "Pet"
