= Allt fyrir ástina =

Studio album by Páll Óskar
- Released: November 7, 2007 (Iceland)
- Recorded: 2007
- Genres: Pop, dance-pop

"Allt fyrir ástina" (All for Love) is an album by Icelandic pop singer and disc jockey Páll Óskar, released on November 7, 2007.

== Track listing ==
#	Title	Time
1.	"Partí fyrir tvo"	4:12
2.	"Allt fyrir ástina"	3:34
3.	"International"	3:18
4.	"Er þetta ást"	5:09
5.	"Kraftaverk"	4:57
6.	"Komdu til mín"	5:07
7.	"Þú komst við hjartað í mér"	5:04
8.	"Penisillín"	4:23
9.	"Betra líf"	3:40
10.	"Nú passar allt"	9:50
11.	"Einhver elskar mig"	4:32

== Singles ==
#	Title	Date
1.	"Allt fyrir ástina"	??
2.	"International"	??
3.	"Betra líf"	October 2007
