= Jakobínarína =

Icelandic rock band

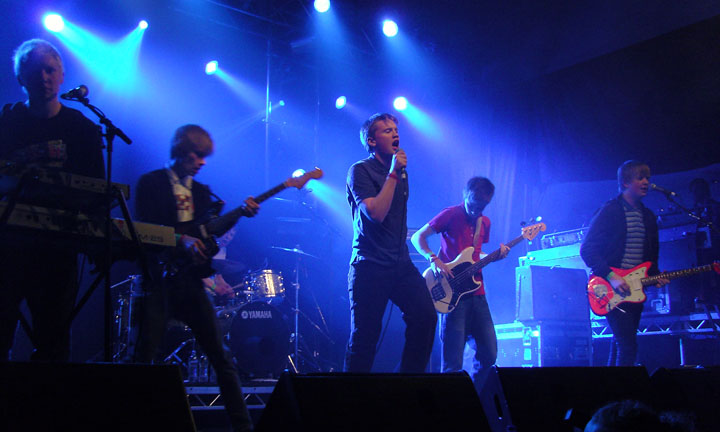
- Jakobínarína, from left to right: Ásgeirsson, Valdimarsson, Sívertsen, Ragnarsson, Pétursson, Hallbergsson

Background information
- Origin: Hafnarfjörður, Iceland
- Genres: Indie rock; garage punk; garage rock revival
- Years active: 2004–2008
- Labels: Regal (UK); Caroline (USA); 12 Tónar (EU)
- Past members: Ágúst Fannar Ásgeirsson; Björgvin Ingi Pétursson; Gunnar Bergmann Ragnarsson; Hallberg Daði Hallbergsson; Heimir Gestur Valdimarsson; Sigurður Möller Sívertsen
- Website: www.jakobinarina.com

Jakobínarína were an Icelandic six-piece indie-punk band from Hafnarfjörður.

Jakobinarina were formed by Ágúst Fannar Ásgeirsson, Björgvin Ingi Pétursson, Gunnar Bergmann, Hallberg Dadi Hallbergsson, Heimir Gestur Valdimarsson and Sigurdur Möller Sívertsen in 2004 when they were at school and gained attention and success after they won the Icelandic version of Battle of the Bands, Músíktilraunir in 2005. In 2006, they performed at the South by Southwest festival, and released their first EP His Lyrics Are Disastrous on Rough Trade Records. They toured Britain and in 2007, they signed to Parlophone and released their debut album The First Crusade. In the autumn of 2007 they toured Europe and the United States but by the following February, the band had folded. They played a final concert on 8 March 2008.

== Band members ==
- Gunnar Bergmann Ragnarsson – lead vocals
- Hallberg Daði Hallbergsson — guitar, backing vocals
- Heimir Gestur Valdimarsson — guitar
- Ágúst Fannar Ásgeirsson — keyboards
- Björgvin Ingi Pétursson — bass guitar
- Sigurður Möller Sívertsen — drums

== Discography ==
Singles:

- 2006: "His Lyrics Are Disastrous " (Original Release) - 31 July 2006
- 2007: "Jesus " - 21 May 2007
- 2007: "This Is An Advertisement" - 23 July 2007
- 2007: "His Lyrics Are Disastrous" - 24 September 2007

Albums:

- 2007: The First Crusade - 1 October 2007
