= X Factor (Icelandic TV series) =

Icelandic TV show

X Factor was the Icelandic version of the popular British television show The X Factor. It premiered in Reykjavík on November 17, 2006, with actress Halla Vilhjálmsdóttir hosting the show. The judges were the talent agent and businessman Einar Bárðarson, rock musician Elínborg Halldórsdóttir and pop singer Paul Oscar. Previously, both Einar and Páll Óskar had been judges in Idol stjörnuleit, the Icelandic version of Pop Idol.

In the finals of X Factor held in Vetrargarðinum, Smáralind, a large shopping center in Iceland, singer and hair dresser Jógvan Hansen from Faroe Islands was the winner.

== Contestants ==
Key:

– Winner
– Runner-up
– Third place

Category (mentor)	Acts			
16-24s (Halldórsdóttir)	Sigurbjörg Tinna Gunnarsdóttir	Guðbjörg Hilmarsdóttir	Gylfi Víðisson	Jóhanna M. Wiklund
Over 25s (Bárðarson)	Jógvan Hansen	Sigurður Ingimarsson	Alan Jones	Inga Sæland
Groups (Oscar)	Fjórflétta	Gís	Hara	Já

== Results summary ==
Colour key

–	Contestant was in the bottom two and had to sing again in the final showdown
–	Contestant received the fewest public votes and was immediately eliminated (no final showdown)
–	Contestant received the most public votes

Weekly results per contestant
Contestant	Week 1	Week 2	Week 3	Week 4	Week 5	Week 6	Week 7	Week 8	Week 9	Week 10	Week 11
Jógvan Hansen	Safe	Safe	Safe	Safe	Safe	Safe	Safe	Safe	Safe	Safe	Winner; 70%
Hara	Safe	Safe	Safe	Safe	Safe	Bottom two	Safe	Safe	Safe	Safe	Runner-up; 30%
Guðbjörg Hilmarsdóttir	Safe	Safe	Safe	Safe	Safe	Safe	Safe	Bottom two	Safe	3rd	Eliminated (week 10)
Gís	Safe	Safe	Safe	Bottom two	Bottom two	Safe	Bottom two	Safe	4th	Eliminated (week 9)	
Inga Sæland	Safe	Safe	Safe	Safe	Safe	Safe	Safe	Bottom two	Eliminated (week 8)		
Gylfi Víðisson	Safe	Safe	Safe	Safe	Safe	Safe	Bottom two	Eliminated (week 7)			
Alan Jones	Safe	Bottom two	Safe	Safe	Safe	Bottom two	Eliminated (week 6)				
Jóhanna M. Wiklund	Bottom two	Safe	Bottom two	Safe	Bottom two	Eliminated (week 5)					
Sigurður Ingimarsson	Safe	Safe	Safe	Bottom two	Eliminated (week 4)						
Fjórflétta	Safe	Safe	Bottom two	Eliminated (week 3)							
Já	Safe	Bottom two	Eliminated (week 2)								
Sigurbjörg Tinna Gunnarsdóttir	Bottom two	Eliminated (week 1)									
Final showdown	Jóhanna M. Wiklund, Sigurbjörg Tinna Gunnarsdóttir	Alan Jones, Já	Fjórflétta, Jóhanna M. Wiklund	Gís, Sigurður Ingimarsson	Gís, Jóhanna M. Wiklund	Alan Jones, Hara	Gís, Gylfi Víðisson	Guðbjörg Hilmarsdóttir, Inga Sæland	No final showdown or judges' votes; results were based on public votes alone		
Bárðarson's vote to eliminate		Já	Fjórflétta	Gís	Jóhanna M. Wiklund	Hara	Gylfi Víðisson	Guðbjörg Hilmarsdóttir	No final showdown or judges' votes; results were based on public votes alone		
Halldórsdóttir's vote to eliminate		Já	Fjórflétta	Sigurður Ingimarsson	Gís	Alan Jones	Gís	Inga Sæland	No final showdown or judges' votes; results were based on public votes alone		
Oscar's vote to eliminate		Alan Jones	Jóhanna M. Wiklund	Sigurður Ingimarsson	Jóhanna M. Wiklund	Alan Jones	Gylfi Víðisson	Inga Sæland	No final showdown or judges' votes; results were based on public votes alone		
Eliminated	Sigurbjörg Tinna Gunnarsdóttir ? of 3 votes Majority	Já; 2 of 3 Votes; Majority	Fjórflétta; 2 of 3 votes Majority	Sigurður Ingimarsson; 2 of 3 votes Majority	Jóhanna M. Wiklund; 2 of 3 votes Majority	Alan Jones; 2 of 3 votes Majority	Gylfi Víðisson; 2 of 3 votes Majority	Inga Sæland; 2 of 3 votes Majority	Gís; Public vote to save	Guðbjörg Hilmarsdóttir; Public vote to save	Hara; Public vote to win
