= The Curse of Singapore Sling =

Studio album by Singapore Sling
- Released: August 2002 (Iceland); 17 June 2003 (U.S.)
- Genre: Neo-psychedelia, shoegaze, noise pop
- Length: 41:00
- Label: Hitt (Iceland); Stinky (U.S.)

Singapore Sling chronology
The Curse of Singapore Sling (2002)	Life Is Killing My Rock 'N' Roll (2004)

Professional ratings
Review scores
Source	Rating
AllMusic	4.5/5 stars
Robert Christgau	(dud)

The Curse of Singapore Sling (also known simply as The Curse Of) is the first studio album by the Icelandic neo-psychedelia band Singapore Sling. It was released in August 2002 by the record label Hitt.

== Background ==
An 8-track demo version of the opening track, "Overdriver", was made available online on the Iceland Airwaves music festival website in 2001, titled "Overdrive".

The closing track, "Dirty Water", was a cover version of the 1966 hit single by the garage rock band the Standells.

Edda (Hitt Records), the now-defunct Icelandic label, produced a music video for "Listen". No single was actually released. The black-and-white clip was directed by Arni Thor Jonsson from the Reykjavík studio Sagofilm and was released in Iceland on 22 October 2002. It shows girls from a volleyball league wearing bikinis and dancing.

== Release ==
The album was released in August 2002 on CD by Hitt Records, and was licensed and released in the United States a year later by the independent label Stinky Records.

== Track listing ==
1. "Overdriver" – 3:46
2. "Summer Garden" – 2:56
3. "Nuthin' Ain't Bad" – 3:38
4. "Midnight" – 5:33
5. "No Soul Man" – 4:21
6. "Roadkill" (instrumental) – 4:36
7. "Listen" – 4:31
8. "Heart of Chrome" – 3:07
9. "Chantissity" – 3:46
10. "Dirty Water" (The Standells cover) – 6:46
