= Dorks and Damsels =

2007 Icelandic film by Gunnar B. Guðmundsson

- Astrópía promotional poster
- Icelandic: Astrópía
- Directed by: Gunnar B. Guðmundsson
- Written by: Ottó Geir Borg; Jóhann Ævar Grímsson
- Produced by: Júlíus Kemp; Ingvar Þórðarson
- Starring: Ragnhildur Steinunn Jónsdóttir; Snorri Engilbertsson; Davíð Þór Jónsson; Sverrir Þór Sverrisson; Pétur Jóhann Sigfússon; Halla Vilhjálmsdóttir; Jörundur Ragnarsson; Bjarni Gautur
- Cinematography: Bergsteinn Björgúlfsson
- Edited by: Sverrir Kristjánsson
- Release date: August 22, 2007
- Running time: 93 minutes
- Country: Iceland
- Language: Icelandic

Dorks and Damsels (Icelandic: Astrópía) is a 2007 Icelandic film directed by Gunnar B. Guðmundsson.

== Plot ==
Hildur, a good-for-nothing beauty who works alongside the criminal car dealer Jolli, is forced to look for work after his arrest. Being hounded by the tabloid press and also very untalented, she fails miserably.

She eventually finds a job at "Astrópía," a shop for role-playing games, DVDs, and comics. Only nerds attend the shop, and all the employees live in their own little worlds. Her boss, who was once the victim of public ridicule when one of his role-playing performances was published online, takes pity on the girl. To improve her sales skills, her employer lets her participate in his role-playing group. Hildur experiences exciting adventures in a world previously foreign to her and also meets new friends. At the same time, she becomes closer to Dagur, a translator of romance novels and a dance teacher. Meanwhile, her boyfriend is working feverishly on his escape.

Jolli finally escapes with twelve of his fellow inmates. He wants to make off but he still needs his bank account details in the Cayman Islands, which he had hidden these details in a locket given to Hildur; so, he calls her and lures her to his cronies. When Dagur notices this, it is too late. Hildur is kidnapped, and he pursues the escapees. On the way, he calls his friends for help. Together they immerse themselves in their role-playing world and are finally able to overpower the kidnappers. Hildur defeats her ex-boyfriend in a sword fight. When the fight is over, Hildur and Dagur kiss, and the scene changes back to reality: a boat at the harbor on which the escapees wanted to flee. The prisoners are taken away by the police.

== Cast ==
- Ragnhildur Steinunn Jónsdóttir as Hildur, a celebrity whose life changes suddenly when her boyfriend Jolli is sent to prison
- Snorri Engilbertsson as Dagur, a translator of romantic novels and customer at Astrópía, who develops a romantic interest in Hildur
- Davíð Þór Jónsson as Jolli, Hildur's boyfriend and owner of a car dealership, who is sent to prison for fraud
- Sverrir Þór Sverrisson as Flóki, an employee at Astrópía who manages the DVD section
- Pétur Jóhann Sigfússon as Pési, an employee at Astrópía who manages the comic book section
- Halla Vilhjálmsdóttir as Beta, a member of Dagur's role-playing group
- Jörundur Ragnarsson as Scat, a member of Dagur's role-playing group
- Halldór Magnússon as Goggi, owner of Astrópía and gamemaster of Dagur's role-playing group
- Sara Guðmundsdóttir as Björt, a friend of Hildur's
- Alexander Sigurðsson as Snorri, Björt's 8-year-old son
- Bjarni Gautur as a customer in Astrópía

== Production ==
The film contains countless references to fantasy and science fiction films and novels, such as Star Wars, The Matrix, and The Lord of the Rings. Other films, such as The Shawshank Redemption, are also satirized. There are also numerous references to various role-playing systems such as World of Darkness and Dungeons & Dragons, tabletop systems, and trading card games.

All locations are in Iceland. The real-life model for the comic book store is Shop Nexus in Reykjavík, the only comic book store in Iceland. It also supervised the actors who were unfamiliar with role-playing. The screenwriter had worked there for years. The music was recorded in Bulgaria.

== Critical reception ==
Alissa Simon of Variety wrote, "This colorfully stylized romantic comedy, set against the fantasy worlds of live-action role-playing (LARP), manga and genre fiction, metamorphosed into Iceland's domestic B.O. champ for 2007. Helmer Gunnar B. Gudmundsson's spirited feature debut reps agreeable fest and Euro tube fare, but is probably too small for theatrical outside Scandinavia. Careful handling could develop a cult following internationally on DVD."
