= The First Crusade (album) =

Studio album by Jakobínarína
- Released: October 1, 2007
- Recorded: Monnow Valley, Monmouth Wales
- Genre: Indie rock, garage rock revival, garage punk
- Length: 35:26
- Label: 12 Tónar, Regal/EMI
- Producer: Stan Kybert

Promo cover
- Promotional copy of The First Crusade

Singles from The First Crusade
- 1. "Jesus/Filipino Girl" Released: May 21, 2007; 2. "This Is An Advertisement/Water Wasser Everywhere" Released: July 23, 2007; 3. "His Lyrics Are Disastrous/Do My Love" Released: September 24, 2007

Professional ratings
Review scores
| Source | Rating |
|---|---|
| Morgunblaðið/MBL | link |
| Neu Magazine | link |
| NME | link |
| Monitor | link |

The First Crusade is the only studio album by the Icelandic band Jakobínarína. It was released on October 1, 2007 on 12 Tónar in Europe, and on Regal/EMI in the UK. The First Crusade was released on CD and LP. The original track listing listed "I've Got A Date With My Television" and "So, Spit Me In The Eye" as "(I've Got A Date With) My Television" and "Spit Me In The Eye". Jakobinarina disbanded shortly after the album's release on March 8, 2008. "I'm a Villain" is featured on the soundtrack to the EA Sports game, FIFA 09.

== Track listing ==
1. "Monday I'm in Vain" – 3:04
2. "His Lyrics Are Disastrous" – 2:17
3. "17" – 2:43
4. "Jesus" – 2:46
5. "Call for Advice" – 4:13
6. "End of Transmission No.6" – 1:32
7. "Sleeping in Seattle" – 2:24
8. "I've Got a Date with My Television" – 2:51
9. "This Is an Advertisement" – 4:01
10. "I'm a Villain" – 2:58
11. "Nice Guys Don't Play Good Music" – 3:08
12. "So, Spit Me in the Eye" – 5:29

== Personnel ==
- Gunnar Ragnarsson – vocals
- Hallberg Daði Hallbergsson – guitar, backing vocals
- Ágúst Fannar Ásgeirsson – keyboard
- Björgvin Ingi Pétursson – bass
- Heimir Gestur Valdimarsson – guitar
- Sigurður Möller Sívertsen – drums
- Marteinn Knaran Ómarsson – piano on "Jesus"
- Eric Yip, Collette Hazen, Jack Duckett and Nick Fry – strings on "I've Got a Date with My Television, "This Is an Advertisement", "I'm A Villain", "Nice Guys Don't Play Good Music" and "So, Spit Me in the Eye"
- Stan Kybert – producer
- Mike Crossley – mixer
- Roy Merchant and Jim Anderson – engineers
