= Rökkurró =

Icelandic folk rock band

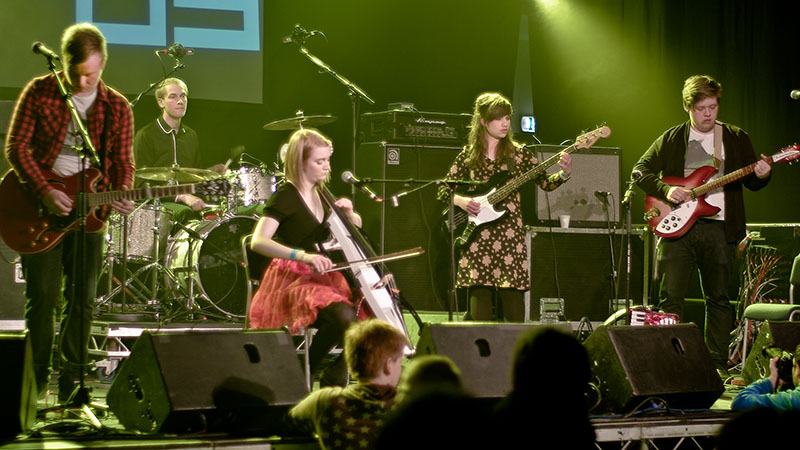
- Rökkurró in Reykjavík, 2009

Background information
- Origin: Reykjavík, Iceland
- Years active: 2006–present
- Labels: 12 Tónar (Iceland); Rallye (Japan); Inner Ear (Greece)
- Members: Axel Ingi Jónsson; Árni Þór Árnason; Björn 'Bibbi' Pálmi Pálmason; Helga Ragnarsdóttir; Hildur Kristín Stefánsdóttir; Skúli Agnarr Einarsson
- Website: rokkurro.com

Rökkurró is an Icelandic music group founded in 2006 in Reykjavík. After a 4-track EP, they were signed to 12 Tónar label. Their debut album was Það kólnar í kvöld.. (meaning "It's Getting Colder Tonight" in Icelandic). It was released in 2007 in Iceland, Europe and Japan to great critical acclaim, followed by a local tour in Iceland and an international tour that included Germany, The Netherlands and Switzerland supporting Ólafur Arnalds. The follow-up album Í Annan Heim (meaning In Another World) was released in 2010. It was produced by Alex Somers. Rökkurró began working on their third studio album, Innra, in 2013, released on October 27, 2014.

== In popular culture ==
- In 2007 they had their first performance abroad, at the Reykjavik to Rotterdam festival.
- In 2010, they were picked by Clash magazine to appear at the Ja Ja Ja Nordic music showcase.
- In 2012, their song "Sólin mun skína" was used in the commercial for the Italian dub of the American show Hoarding: Buried Alive.
- The former bass player of the band, Ingibjörg, now plays in the band Boogie Trouble.

== Discography ==
- 2007: Það kólnar í kvöld..
- 2010: Í Annan Heim
- 2014: Innra
