= Apparat Organ Quartet =

Icelandic electronica band

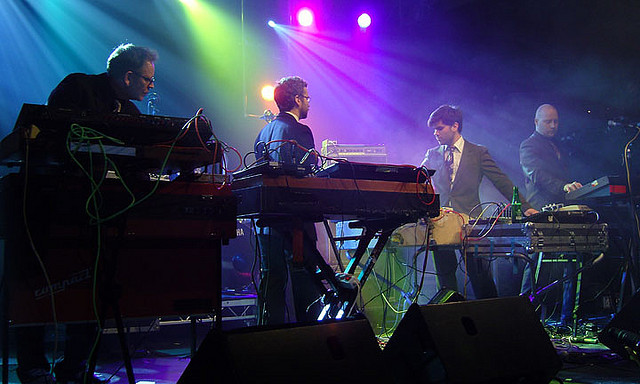
- Apparat Organ Quartet at Iceland Airwaves 2006

Background information
- Origin: Reykjavík, Iceland
- Genres: Electronica
- Years active: 1999–present
- Labels: 12 Tónar, Skelt Music, Crunchy Frog Records
- Members: Arnar Geir Ómarsson; Hörður Bragason; Sighvatur Ómar Kristinsson; Úlfur Eldjárn
- Past members: Jóhann Jóhannsson; Þorvaldur Gröndal
- Website: Apparat Organ Quartet on Facebook

Apparat Organ Quartet was founded in 1999 in Reykjavík, Iceland. It is a band that originally included the musicians Hörður Bragason, Músikvatur, Úlfur Eldjárn and Jóhann Jóhannsson. They were soon joined by drummer Þorvaldur Gröndal, replaced in 2001 by Arnar Geir Ómarsson, drummer of the Icelandic rock band HAM. Lacking the time to dedicate himself to the group because of his solo projects, Jóhann Jóhannsson left the band in 2012; he died in February 2018.

== History ==
The band was originally conceived by Jóhann Jóhannsson as a collaborative project for a concert series curated by Kitchen Motors, a record label and art collective founded by Jóhannsson, Hilmar Jensson and Kristín Björk Kristjánsdóttir. In 2002, Apparat Organ Quartet released their self-titled debut album on the Thule Records label in Iceland; in 2005, the album was re-released on the Icelandic 12 Tónar label in a new remastered version. The second album of the band, Pólýfónía, was released on 9 December 2010 on 12 Tónar in Iceland, and in 2011 by the Danish label Crunchy Frog in Scandinavia.

The band's sound has evolved from the atmospheric and minimalistic post-rock documented on the Kitchen Motors compilations "Nart Nibbles" and "Motorlab 2" to a more robust, riff-driven sound, with a mixture of Kraftwerk-inspired electronics, Daft Punk-like robot voices, and hard rock beats. They have been compared to such different acts as Kraftwerk, Wagner, Goblin, Terry Riley, Steve Reich, Sigur Rós, the Glitter Band, Stereolab and Trans Am.

Apparat Organ Quartet's members (and former members) and their extra curricular activities include:

- Arnar Geir Ómarsson, a graphic designer who has worked with Magga Stina, HAM, Lhooq and many other artists.
- Hörður Bragason, a former church organist.
- Jóhann Jóhannsson, who had a solo career as a genre-crossing composer.
- Sighvatur Ómar Kristinsson, who has collaborated with múm and released several solo singles as Músikvatur.
- Úlfur Eldjárn, who has composed a lot of music for theatre and TV series.
- Þorvaldur Gröndal, who has been the drummer of electronic-pop/rock band Trabant and The Funerals

Apparat Organ Quartet was one of many Icelandic bands documented in Ari Alexander Ergis Magnússon's 2005 film Screaming Masterpiece (Gargandi Snilld in Icelandic).

== Discography ==
=== Albums ===
- Apparat Organ Quartet (2002, Thule Records; 2005, 12 Tónar, 12T021, Re-Release, Remastered Version)
- Pólýfónía (9 December 2010, 12 Tónar, 12T053; Crunchy Frog Records, 2011)

=== Compilations ===
- Nart Nibbles (1999, Kitchen Motors) — Contributed "Nafnlaust uppklapp"
- Motorlab #2 (2001, Kitchen Motors) — Contributed three songs featuring TF3IRA: "Charlie Tango no. 2," "Ondula Nova," and "Sálmur"
- Screaming Masterpiece (2005, Smekkleysa) — Appeared in the documentary and contributed "Romantica"
- Kitchen Motors Family Album/Fjölskyldualbúm Tilraunaeldhússins (2006, Kitchen Motors/12 Tónar) — Contributed "Stylophonia"

=== Singles ===
- "Romantika" (2003) from Apparat Organ Quartet — Also includes "Macht parat den Apparat" and "Romantika (premix)"
- "Cargo Frakt" (Gogoyoko, 29 November 2010) from Pólýfónía
