= Anna Mjöll =

Icelandic jazz singer and songwriter

Anna Mjöll Ólafsdóttir is an Icelandic jazz singer and songwriter.

== Early years ==
Mjöll was born in Reykjavík, Iceland, the daughter of Svanhildur Jakobsdóttir, singer and TV and Radio Personality, and Ólafur Gaukur, jazz guitarist, film composer, songwriter, arranger and producer. Her only sibling, Andri, works as a General Surgeon in Arizona, United States. Mjöll's parents played six nights a week in her early years. They toured every summer bringing in dancers, fire eaters and magicians from the UK. She began studying guitar herself at the age of six, followed by piano and cello. She wrote and performed her first song when she was eight. In high school she performed jazz numbers on her cello and at 18 she started singing professionally in local restaurants. Mjöll obtained a college degree from Menntaskólinn í Reykjavík and studied at Sorbonne in Paris, France, before going to Los Angeles to play jazz.

== Career ==
Mjöll performed extensively on Icelandic television early on. She represented Iceland at Eurovision Song Contest 1996 with the song "Sjúbídú", which she co-wrote with her father.

In the lyrics she sings about some of her idols including Ella Fitzgerald, Frank Sinatra, Elvis Presley, Sammy Davis Jr. and Dizzy Gillespie. She toured worldwide with the singer Julio Iglesias for three years. In 2006, she co-wrote and performed three songs with C.J. Vanston for the film For Your Consideration.

In 2009, Mjöll released her first album, The Shadow Of Your Smile, containing a mix of Icelandic songs and jazz standards. The CD included a number of notable musicians including Vinnie Colaiuta, Dave Carpenter, Don Grusin, Neil Stubenhaus, and Luis Conte, and was voted one of the top 5 female vocal jazz CDs of 2009 at Arnaldo DeSouteiro's Jazz Station. In 2009, Mjöll was voted one of the top 5 jazz singers of the year by DeSouteiro's Jazz Station.

In 2010, Mjöll released her second album, Christmas Jazzmaz. In 2023, she released her third album, Live In Studio 3, recorded live in front of an audience at EastWest Studios in Hollywood, California.

== Personal life ==
Mjöll and American musician, songwriter, and producer Patrick Leonard were married on 19 November 2018, in Patrick's home town, Crystal Falls, Michigan, U.S.

Mjoll is a licensed Private Pilot with an Instrument rating.

== See also ==
- List of Icelandic writers
- Culture of Iceland
