= My Summer As A Salvation Soldier =

My Summer As A Salvation Soldier (Þórir)
- Birth name: Þórir Georg Jónsson
- Born: Iceland
- Occupation(s): Singer, songwriter
- Instrument(s): Vocals, guitar
- Years active: 2004 – present
- Labels: 12 Tónar

Þórir Georg Jónsson better known by his pseudonym My Summer As A Salvation Soldier is an Icelandic singer-songwriter, also known by the mononym Þórir.

His first album I Belive in This was released in 2004 (as Þórir), it was recorded in just over two days. This was followed up by Anarchists Are Hopeless Romantics in 2005 (as My Summer As A Salvation Soldier). Both records were released on the 12 Tónar label. His third album entitled Activism was released in 2008. Beside these albums, he had some self-released EPs made available through his website.

Þórir also plays guitar in several hardcore bands, such as Fighting Shit, Hrydjuverk, and Gavin Portland. He is also the lead singer of the punk band Deathmetal Supersquad.

Jónsson is straight edge and a vegetarian.

== Discography ==
=== Albums ===
as Þórir

- 2004: I Belive in This

as My Summer As A Salvation Soldier

- 2005: Anarchists Are Hopeless Romantics
- 2008: Activism
- 2009: Nýtt
