= A Little Trip to Heaven =

2005 film by Baltasar Kormákur

- Promotional film poster
- Directed by: Baltasar Kormákur
- Written by: Edward Martin Weinman; Baltasar Kormákur
- Produced by: Sigurjón Sighvatsson; Baltasar Kormákur
- Starring: Forest Whitaker; Julia Stiles; Jeremy Renner; Peter Coyote
- Cinematography: Óttar Guðnason
- Edited by: Richard Pearson
- Music by: Mugison
- Distributed by: First Look Studios
- Release date: 26 December 2005 (Iceland)
- Running time: 86 minutes
- Countries: Iceland; United States
- Language: English
- Budget: $4 million

A Little Trip to Heaven is a 2005 Icelandic-American noir-inspired thriller film directed by Baltasar Kormákur. It is set in 1985 United States, but almost entirely shot in Iceland. Icelandic musician Mugison composed and performed the soundtrack, except for the song "A Little Trip to Heaven", which is originally by Tom Waits. Mugison performs the Waits song on the soundtrack.

== Plot ==
Before the opening credits, a recent widow is sitting in a life insurance office. Expecting to be compensated for her husband's death, the widow is informed that she is not entitled to full death benefits because the insurance company has obtained video of her husband smoking and attributes his death to cigarettes. Abe Holt looks on as his co-worker convinces the widow that she's lucky to leave with a small fraction of the award she was expecting.

The film centers around three vehicle crashes, revealed in sequence at the beginning of the movie. The first depicts a young couple flying through the open roof of their convertible, which has been sailed over a cliff. They swim to shore, where the woman hits the leg of her fellow passenger with a pipe. The second involves a city bus and insurance adjustor Abe Holt, who has arrived at the scene suspicious that many of the passengers boarded the bus after the accident, looking to file a claim. Holt bluffs, claiming a hidden camera will help sort out who was actually on the bus. Many leave, and his co-worker quickly tells him their company wants him to investigate a crash in the remote and desolate town of North Hastings, Minnesota.

The third crash involves an unnamed young man who is stranded at the side of the road on a rainy night, after stopping in the local bar. He accepts a ride from the driver who had previously drained his gas tank, and who then proceeds to accelerate the car into the wall of a tunnel, injuring his passenger in the wreck. The anonymous man is dragged to the front seat and buckled in before the siphoned gas is poured over the car and set ablaze. However, to those who later discover the crash it appears that the actual driver Kelvin Anderson has died after crashing his own car into the tunnel wall, igniting a fire that burned his body beyond recognition. The local police are convinced it is an open-and-shut case because Kelvin's driver's license was found in the glovebox, the plates on the car match Kelvin's, and Kelvin's sister, Isold, lives on the far side of the tunnel.

However, Holt is suspicious because while the body is conveniently unidentifiable, the license is undamaged and Isold, the sole beneficiary of the $1 million policy, is skittish and was not expecting her brother's visit. Isold's husband "Fred" McBride (Jeremy Renner), is unexpectedly cheerful and vaguely threatening, convincing Holt there's more to this case. As he investigates the case Holt uncovers leading clues: Frederick McBride is actually dead and buried in a field outside the abandoned McBride home, and the supposedly dead Kelvin has a record as a con man. The most convincing evidence is photos of Kelvin from his criminal record and high school, showing him looking like "Fred." Holt eventually confirms that the charred body pulled from the car wreck is not Kelvin's, that Isold's "husband" is actually her brother Kelvin. A flashback reveals that the couple from the convertible seen at the opening of the movie was Isold and Kelvin, wrecking their car—and Kelvin's leg—for insurance money.

When Isold figures out that her brother has murdered an innocent drifter she is horrified, but Kelvin convinces her to participate in this final con and hold hostage his son Thor, whom Isold has been helping to raise since the boy's mother left. When Isold visits the insurance office to collect on Kelvin's policy, Holt—in an echo of the movie's opening scene—informs her that he cannot award her the full $1 million she expects, only the blue book value of his car ($1500). She leaves angrily. When Holt tells Isold she's lucky he hasn't exposed her as an accessory to murder, she tells him that her brother has taken Thor. Moved and concerned, Holt puts a one-day hold on her check (ensuring that she'll return to the bank the next day) and changes the name of the insured on the policy from "Kelvin Anderson" to "Frederick McBride."

The next day Isold cashes her check and opens a safety deposit box, in which she puts a childhood picture of her and her brother. She returns to the motel where Kelvin is staying with Thor, and tries to convince him that she has left the rest of the money in the safety deposit box, so that she can leave with Thor. Kelvin doesn't buy it, and gets in his car with Thor—only to find he's held at gunpoint by Holt, in the backseat. Holt tells Isold to leave with the boy and "Fred" speeds off, buckling his seatbelt (a sign he intends to crash the car). Kelvin crashes the car, killing both men, and Isold is awarded the full benefits of the tampered life insurance policy.

The film ends with Abe walking on a beach meant to suggest heaven, that is identical to the beach featured in the insurance company's commercial shown earlier in the film, as the credits roll.

== Cast ==
- Forest Whitaker as Abe Holt
- Jeremy Renner as Fred McBride
- Julia Stiles as Isold McBride
- Peter Coyote as Frank
- Joanna Scanlan as Josie
- Philip Jackson as William
- Iddo Goldberg as Russle

== Critical reception ==
On review aggregator website Rotten Tomatoes, the film holds 33% approval rating, based on 6 reviews with an average rating of 4.7/10.

Kirk Honeycutt wrote in Hollywood Reporter that Kormakur "falls short in the story department and even shorter in evoking the droll, twisted humor that must carry the day".

According to Kevin Courrier of Boxoffice Pro "[t]he pacing [of the film] makes you feel like you're trudging through the snow".

Dennis Harvey of Variety criticized the film for the feeling of "ESL Cinema, its [murky] narrative", as well "[undeveloped] characters, [dislocated] sense of place", and "fuzzy overall intent" that is "ill-compensated for by quirky touches".

On March 13, 2007, the film was released on a DVD. David Walker had reviewed it, saying that "[the film] is a throwback to the sort of indie films that came out in the 1980s and early 90s". He also added that "A Little Trip to Heaven is certainly worth watching, and it even warrants a second viewing, as it is the sort of film with subtle details that take on renewed meaning once you understand the story in its entirety".

== Filming locations ==
The film was set in northern Minnesota but most of it was shot in Iceland.
