= The Magic Wardrobe =

2011 Icelandic film by Bragi Hinriksson

- Film poster
- Directed by: Bragi Hinriksson
- Written by: Bragi Hinriksson; Sverrir Þór Sverrisson
- Produced by: Zakaría Hinriksson; Sverrir Þór Sverrisson
- Starring: Sverrir Þór Sverrirsson; Vilhelm Anton Jónsson; Guðjón Davíð Karlsson
- Cinematography: Jóhann Máni Jóhannsson
- Release date: 9 September 2011
- Running time: 90 minutes
- Country: Iceland
- Language: Icelandic

The Magic Wardrobe (Icelandic: Algjör Sveppi og töfraskápurinn) is a 2011 Icelandic family film directed by Bragi Hinriksson.

== Cast ==
- Sverrir Þór Sverrisson as Sveppi
- Vilhelm Anton Jónsson as Villi
- Guðjón Davíð Karlsson as Gói
