= Anna Guðný Guðmundsdóttir =

Icelandic pianist (1958–2022)

Anna Guðný Guðmundsdóttir (6 September 1958–11 September 2022) was an Icelandic pianist and member of the Iceland Symphony Orchestra. She was one of the leading Icelandic pianists of her generation, both as soloist and collaborative pianist.

== Career ==
Anna Guðný was born in Reykjavík and began music studies at a young age. She attended the Children's Music School in Reykjavík, and later the Reykjavík College of Music, completing her studies there in 1979. She then attended the Guildhall School of Music and Drama in London, where she completed a Postgraduate Diploma in 1982.

Anna Guðný appeared frequently in chamber music and ensembles, and recorded over 30 CDs with various artists. She was the pianist of the Reykjavík Chamber Orchestra and from 2005 she was a member of the Iceland Symphony Orchestra. She was on the faculty of the Iceland University of the Arts (formerly Iceland Academy of the Arts) from 2001–2005.

She also performed as a soloist, and had a particular affinity with the works of Olivier Messiaen. In 1991, she performed the piano part in his Turangalîla-Symphony with the Iceland Youth Symphony (Sinfóníuhljómsveit æskunnar) under the baton of Paul Zukofsky, and in 2004 performed his Trois Petites Liturgies de la présence divine with Zukofsky and the Reykjavík Chamber Orchestra. Her largest achievement as a soloist was the performance, to mark Messiaen's centenary in 2008, of the piano cycle Vingt Regards sur l'Enfant-Jésus, which she also recorded. In 2012 she performed his Visions de l'Amen at Harpa Concert Hall with pianist Tinna Þorsteinsdóttir. She also appeared at various festivals, including the Reykjavík Arts Festival, and the Midsummer Music festival in Harpa Concert Hall.

== Awards ==
Anna Guðný has been recognised on several occasions for her contributions to Icelandic classical music. In 1997, she received the Order of the White Rose of Finland. In 2002, she was Honorary Artist of her home town of Mosfellsbær, and she was nominated three times for the Icelandic Music Awards, which she won in 2008 for her performance of Olivier Messiaen's Vingt Regards sur l'Enfant-Jésus. She has been acknowledged for her role in promoting contemporary Icelandic repertoire and supporting emerging musicians. In 2022, she was given the Honorary Award at the Icelandic Music Awards, and was made a Commander of the Order of the Falcon for her contribution to music in Iceland.

== Selected recordings ==
- Atli Heimir Sveinsson: Concerto Serpentinada (with Reykjavík Chamber Orchestra). Smekkleysa, 2002.
- Atli Heimir Sveinsson: Flute Sonata and other works (with Áshildur Haraldsdóttir, flute). Smekkleysa, 2006.
- Olivier Messiaen: Vingt Regards sur l'Enfant-Jésus. Musis, 2009.
- Þorkell Sigurbjörnsson: Works for Violin and Piano (with Sibbi Bernhardsson, violin). Smekkleysa, 2018.
