= Trabant (Icelandic band) =

Icelandic pop/rock band

- Origin: Reykjavík, Iceland
- Genres: Rock, pop, electro
- Years active: 2001–present
- Labels: 12 Tónar (Iceland); Southern Fried Records (UK)
- Members: Ragnar Kjartansson; Þorvaldur Gröndal; Viðar H. Gíslason; Hlynur A. Vilmarsson; Gísli Galdur Þorgeirsson

Trabant is an electronic-pop/rock band from Reykjavík, Iceland, known for their live performances. Trabant's style of music is a blend of electronic music, punk, R&B and pop. Their diverse and unique music style has been given generally positive reviews.

== Members ==
- Ragnar Kjartansson: singer
- Þorvaldur Gröndal: electronic drummer
- Viðar H. Gíslason: guitar / bass guitar
- Hlynur A. Vilmarsson: keyboards
- Gísli Galdur Þorgeirsson: DJ

== Discography ==
=== Releases ===
==== Albums ====
- Emotional (2005)
- Trabant á Bessastöðum (2004)
- Ballet (2002)
- Moment of Truth (2001)

==== Singles ====
- The One (2006)
- Loving Me 12" (2006)
- Maria 12" (2006)
- Nasty Boy 12" (2006)
- Superman 7" (2002)
- Superman (2002)
- Enter Spacebar Remixes (2001)
- Enter Spacebar (2001)

==== Other ====
- Lobster or Fame - VA (2005)
- Mixed Live: Gus Gus - VA (2003)
