= Mugison =

Icelandic musician (born 1976)

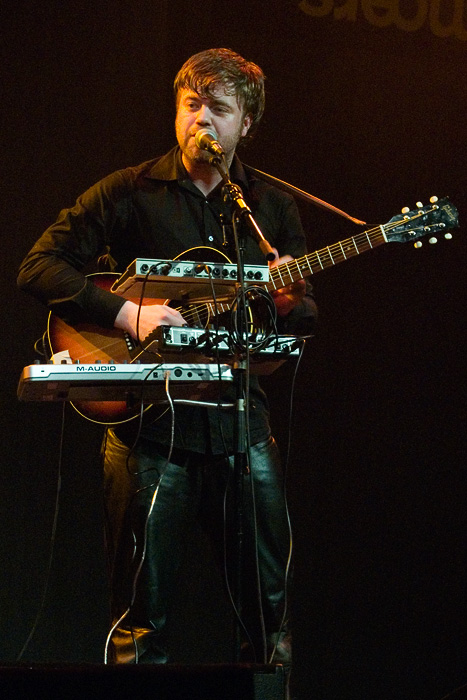
- Mugison at Moers Festival in 2006

Background information
- Born: Örn Elías Guðmundsson; September 4, 1976 (age 50); Reykjavík, Iceland
- Genres: Electronic music, trip hop, indie rock
- Occupations: Musician, singer-songwriter
- Instrument: Guitar
- Years active: 2003–present
- Website: www.mugison.com

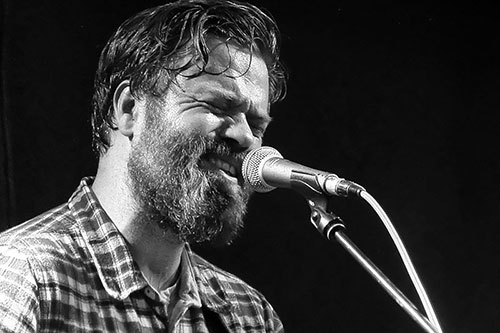
Mugison in Aarhus, Denmark, 2015

Örn Elías Guðmundsson (born 4 September 1976), known professionally as Mugison, is an Icelandic musician and singer-songwriter known for his work in electronic music, trip hop, and indie rock.

== Early life ==
Mugison was born in Reykjavík to his mother and father (Guðmundur Kristjánsson) and lived in Ísafjörður until the age of six, when his family moved to Cape Verde. His father had been sent there by the Icelandic government as part of a development program to train local fishermen. Mugison spent much of his childhood in Cape Verde before entering the fishing industry as a teenager.

== Career ==
=== Aldrei fór ég suður festival ===
Mugison and his father, Guðmundur Kristjánsson, founded the annual Aldrei fór ég suður ("I Never Went South") music festival in 2004. It was named after the Bubbi Morthens song of the same name. The festival has never charged an entry fee, and performing bands are not paid.

=== 2005–present ===
Mugison released his debut album, Lonely Mountain in 2003 through Accidental Records. In 2004, he made the soundtrack for the drama film Niceland. His second album, Mugimama Is This Monkey Music? was released in 2004 in North America by Mike Patton's label IPECAC Records. Mugison played 200 gigs in 2005 to promote the album, including supporting Fantômas in London at the HMV Forum and playing Roskilde festival. He also shared stages with José González and Hot Chip. Continuing his soundtrack work, Mugison scored the thriller film A Little Trip To Heaven in 2005.

In 2006, Mugison founded the record label Mugiboogie. He also performed at the G-festival in the Faroe Islands and at the SPOT Festival, where he performed with a live band for the first time.

In 2007, he released his third studio album Mugiboogie. Mugison wanted the album to sound timeless. The idea was for it to sound similar to a 'Best Of' compilation. The album leans more into rock influences than Mugison’s previous electronic work, drawing inspiration from George Harrison. Following the release of Mugiboogie in Europe on his own label and Ipecac Records in North America, booking agent William Morris approached him to represent his touring interests in North America. Mugiboogie sold over 10,000 records in Iceland without radio support.

Gig highlights in 2008 promoting his third studio album include:

- Supporting Queens Of The Stone Age during their 2008 Canadian Tour
- Mugison's first US tour, from New York to LA in three weeks, with a 2-piece band setup with his good friend Davíð Þór Jónsson
- Popkomm in Berlin – the day Iceland went bankrupt
- The Nightmare Before Christmas - Curated by The Melvins and Mike Patton (ATP Festival)
- Three headline tours around Europe, plus a second appearance at Roskilde Festival in 2008

In 2009, Mugison released his album A Reminder, which contained many songs that had been modified over many years. He sold the album through his website and toured in Iceland with Björgvin Gíslasson. Later that year, Mugison was invited to an Amnesty International charity event at which he performed in all five boroughs of New York in one day.

In 2011, he released his fourth album Haglél. The album sold over 30,000 copies in 2011. Recorded entirely in Icelandic using a simple two-track sound card, the album was made with friends in various houses and home studios. As a way to show gratitude to people who bought his album, he performed three free concerts in Reykjavík at Harpa in December 2011. The second performance was broadcast live on RUV and was the highest-rated TV show on the channel in 2011. Mugison has also performed some more free concerts in Seyðisfjörður, Vestmannaeyjar, Bolungarvik and Akureyri.

All of Mugison's albums were handmade, and creating 30,000 copies became a full-time job for some of his friends and family.

== Discography ==
- 2003: Lonely Mountain
- 2004: Niceland (Soundtrack)
- 2004: Mugimama Is This Monkey Music?
- 2005: Little Trip (Soundtrack)
- 2007: Mýrin (Soundtrack)
- 2008: Mugiboogie
- 2009: Ítrekun
- 2011: Haglél
- 2016: Enjoy!
- 2023: É Dúdda Mía

== Collaborations ==
- Dani Siciliano – All The Above – writer, singer
- Cheek Mountain Thief – "You Are The Demon."
- Bubbi Morthens – Þorpið 2012
- Björgvin Halldórsson – "Minning"
- Wrote and performed a song with the band Reykjavík called "Sumarást"
- Wrote a song with Múm (unreleased), performed in Poland, known as "Stamina."
- Wrote a song with Icelandic reggae band Hjálmar called "Ljósvíkingur"
- Sang two songs on Tómas R. Einarssons album Trúnó, "Stolin Stef" and "Náungar Mínir"

On all of his albums, Mugison worked with Pétur Ben (who co-wrote Murr Murr), who is responsible for string arrangements on many of the songs, and also played guitar. His partner Rúna was featured on every album, while his friend Biggi mixed and mastered all albums. Gudni Finnsson and Arnar Gislason have respectively played bass and drums, both live and in the studio, since 2006.

== Awards ==
| Award | Year | Category | Work(s) | Result | Ref. |
|---|---|---|---|---|---|
| Icelandic Music Awards | 2004 | Performer of the Year | | Won | |
| Icelandic Music Awards | 2004 | Best Album | Mugimama Is This Monkey Music? | Won | |
| Icelandic Music Awards | 2004 | Best Cover Art | | Won | |
| Icelandic Music Awards | 2004 | Song of the Year | Murr Murr | Won | |
| Icelandic Music Awards | 2004 | Album of the Year | Mugimama Is This Monkey Music? | Won | |
| Icelandic Music Awards | 2006 | Performer of the Year | | Won | |
| Icelandic Music Awards | 2007 | Best Rock and Alternative Album of the Year | Mugiboogie | Won | |
| Icelandic Music Awards | 2007 | Best Cover Art | | Won | |
| Icelandic Music Awards | 2007 | Best Video | | Won | |
| Icelandic Music Awards | 2007 | Album of the Year | Mugiboogie | Won | |
| Icelandic Music Awards | 2011 | Album of the Year | Haglél | Won | |
| Icelandic Music Awards | 2011 | Songwriter of the Year | | Won | |
| Icelandic Music Awards | 2011 | Best Song of the Year | | Won | |
| Icelandic Music Awards | 2011 | Best Lyrics of the Year | | Won | |
| Icelandic Music Awards | 2011 | Most Popular Performer | | Won | |

== Personal life ==
Guðmundsson got the nickname "Mugison" while on holiday visiting his father, Muggi (Muggur), in Malaysia. His father is a karaoke singer, and, as the crowds at the karaoke bars in the small fishing villages they were touring had problems pronouncing his name, they came to call him "Mugison". Mugison is the Icelandic naming convention for the surname of someone who is "the son of Muggi".
