= Music of Iceland =

The music of Iceland includes folk and pop traditions, as well as an active classical and contemporary music scene. Well-known artists from Iceland include medieval music group Voces Thules, alternative pop band The Sugarcubes, singers Björk, Laufey, Daði Freyr, Hafdís Huld and Emiliana Torrini, post-rock band Sigur Rós and Múm, post-metal band Sólstafir, indie folk/indie pop band Of Monsters and Men, blues/rock band Kaleo, metal band Skálmöld and techno-industrial band Hatari. Iceland's traditional music is related to Nordic music forms. Although Iceland has a very small population, it is home to many famous and praised bands and musicians.

== Folk music ==
Extract from Núma rímur

Rímur are epic tales sung as alliterative, rhyming ballads, usually a cappella. Rímur can be traced back to the Viking Age Eddic poetry of the skalds and employs complex metaphors and cryptic rhymes and forms. Some of the most famous rímur were written between the 18th and early 20th centuries, by poets like Hannes Bjarnason (1776–1838), Jón Sigurðsson (1853–1922) and Sigurður Breiðfjörð (1798–1846).

In the early 18th century, European dances like polka, waltz, reel and schottische begin to arrive via Denmark. These foreign dances are today known as gömlu dansarnir or literally the "old dances". After their arrival, native dance and song traditions fell into serious decline. For a long time, rímur were officially banned by the church. Paradoxically, many Icelandic priests were keen in making rímur. Rímur remained popular recreation until the early 20th century. In recent years, efforts have been made to revive native Icelandic forms. For example, a modern revitalization of the Rímur tradition began in 1929 with the formation of the organization Iðunn.

Protestantism has also left its mark on the music of Iceland. Hallgrímur Pétursson wrote numerous Protestant hymns in the 17th century. In the 19th century, Magnús Stephensen brought pipe organs to Iceland, soon to be followed by harmonium pumped reed-organs. "Heyr himna smiður" ("Hark, Creator of the Heaven") is probably the oldest hymn which is still sung today; the text was composed by Kolbeinn Tumason in 1208 but the music is much more recent. The music was written by Þorkell Sigurbjörnsson in 1973.

== Popular music ==
The music of Iceland includes vibrant folk and pop traditions and is expanding in its variety of sound styles and genres. Well-known artists from Iceland include alternative rock band The Sugarcubes, singers Björk, Hafdís Huld and Emilíana Torrini, and post-rock band Sigur Rós, as well as electronic music groups like GusGus. Iceland's traditional music is related to Nordic music forms.

Icelandic popular music today includes many bands and artists, ranging from indie and pop-rock to electronic music. It is also increasingly becoming recognized for its vibrant and growing metal and hardcore scene.

One widely known Icelandic artist is eclectic singer and composer Björk, who has received 15 Grammy nominations and sold over 15 million albums worldwide, including two platinum albums and one gold album in the United States. Another is the post-rock formation Sigur Rós and its lead singer Jónsi. Widely known outside Iceland, they were immortalized in an episode of The Simpsons and more recently in an episode of Game of Thrones.

== Popular artists ==
=== Indie and pop-rock ===
According to the Icelandic label Record Records, the indie pop-folk group Of Monsters and Men is Iceland's biggest act since Björk and Sigur Rós. Their debut album My Head Is an Animal, as well as their first single "Little Talks", reached high positions in single and album charts worldwide. In 2013 they won the European Border Breakers Awards. Singer-songwriter Ásgeir Trausti did likewise in 2014, and ever since has been successfully touring Europe and the U.S. with his melodic-folk-pop songs, which he sings both in his native language Icelandic and in English. The singer-songwriter Emiliana Torrini is an established Icelandic artist who had a base in the UK for many years. Her song "Jungle Drum", from her 2008 album Me and Armini, is internationally known and reached number one in the German, Austrian, Belgium and Icelandic single charts. Her album Tookah, released in 2013, reached the Top 50 album charts in several countries.

Other artists that are attracting attention outside Iceland include the electro-pop group FM Belfast, indie pop / rock / folk band Kaleo as well as the singers and composers Sóley and Sin Fang, who are both known as founding members of the band Seabear.

=== Alternative and metal ===
The alternative and metal scene is vibrant with Icelandic bands playing large festivals in Europe and the United States. The metal-band Sólstafir is widely known outside Iceland. Already back in 1999 they had a contract for their debut album with a German record label. The Viking-Metal Band Skálmöld played two sold out shows with the Iceland Symphony Orchestra in the capital's concert hall Harpa in December 2013. Agent Fresco combine metal, rock and alternative elements with the unique voice of singer Arnór Dan Arnarson and have also gained international attention. The instrumental post-rock and alternative-rock band For a Minor Reflection is widely known since supported Sigur Rós on tour back in 2009. Their sound is often compared to Explosions in the Sky or the Scottish post-rock band Mogwai. Dead Skeletons are not only known for their unique psychedelic-rock sound but also for their artwork and an art gallery in Reykjavik run by front man and singer Jón Sæmundur Auðarson. The Vintage Caravan, founded by two of the members in 2006 when they were only 12 years old, have played festivals in Europe, including the Wacken Open Air and toured with bigger bands like Europe and Opeth.

Iceland also has a thriving extreme metal scene which is gaining recognition abroad. The black metal band Svartidauði are widely considered a central figure in the development of the Icelandic black metal scene. Many of the scene's most significant albums were recorded and produced at Studio Emissary, a recording studio set up by Irish musician Stephen Lockhart, and the cassette label Vánagandr has also had a significant role in the development of the country's black metal scene. In 2016, the music festival Oration MMXVI debuted as Iceland's first black metal festival, and subsequently returned for two final instalments in 2017 and 2018. In 2016, black metal band Misþyrming were selected as one of Roadburn Festival's artists in residence.

=== Electronic music ===
The techno house group GusGus is one of Iceland's most successful exports in the field of electronic music. So far they released nine studio albums. The latest Lies Are More Flexible came out in February 2018.

Hatari is a techno-industrial group from Iceland, most notable for their participation in Eurovision Song Contest 2019 with the song Hatrið mun sigra, where they placed 10th in the Grand Final.

Other artists include DJ duo Gluteus Maximus, Hermigervill, Bloodgroup and Sísý Ey.

The international franchise Sónar held their first festival in Reykjavik in 2013 with a long roster of international and local electronic acts.

=== Experimental ===
Ben Frost, born in Melbourne, living in Reykjavik, is bringing together electronic soundscapes with classical elements and noisy tunes. His latest album, Aurora, was released in June 2014.

Classical elements also characterize the symphonic music of composer and singer Ólafur Arnalds. Other widely known experimental bands are Múm and the high school originated Hjaltalín.

The trio Samaris have gained attention, especially in Europe, and have played festivals all over Europe. Their self-released EP, Stofnar falla, received positive reviews and was followed by their self-titled debut album, released in July 2013.

Mengi in Reykjavik is a centre for avant garde music, experimental music and contemporary music. The organisation organizes performances, exhibitions, conferences and runs a recording studio and a record label.

=== Classical music ===
==== Plainchant and polyphonic singing in the Middle Ages and Renaissance ====
With the Christianization of Iceland ca. 1000 came music traditionally associated with the Roman Catholic church. Plainchant was sung daily in churches, and later also in monasteries and nunneries. This was in accordance with the rite of the archbishopric of Nidaros (Trondheim) in Norway. A significant work of Icelandic origin is Þorlákstíðir, the office for Saint Thorlákur, which survives in a music manuscript from ca. 1400. Most of the manuscripts containing this music were destroyed after the Reformation, and only survive in fragments. Many of them were later used for book-binding and were removed from the binding in the early 20th century; these fragments are now found in archives in Reykjavík and Copenhagen.

Plainchant was also sometimes sung in two parts, called tvísöngur in Icelandic. This tradition goes back to at least the early 13th century, since the Bishop Lárentíus Kálfsson tried to ban it ca. 1220, wanting instead that singers would sing only "what was written in the choirbooks." Despite this, tvísöngur is found in manuscripts from the 15th-18th centuries and was a significant performing tradition, both in sacred and secular contexts. Other polyphonic music was introduced in the 16th century, presumably by the schoolmaster Erasmus Villatsson, who is said to have introduced "discantus" or four-part music, to students at the Latin school at Skálholt in the 1560s. In recent years, the origins of these works have been traced to well-known songs from continental Europe, such as the famous Susanne un jour by Didier Lupi, which in Icelandic was sung as "Súsanna, sannan Guðs dóm." Also, the song "Vera mátt góður," found in the 17th-century manuscript Melódía (Rask 98), now in the Arnamagnæan collection in Copenhagen) is ultimately derived from a song by the Florentine composer Francesco Corteccia, "Ecce bonum licet".

==== Composition ====
Aside from the traditions mentioned above, classical music came to Iceland comparatively late, with the first Iceland composers working in the western, classical tradition emerging in the late 19th century and the early 20th century. Among them was Sveinbjörn Sveinbjörnsson, who is considered to have been the first Icelandic professional composer. Among his contributions to Icelandic music is the national anthem, Lofsöngur. Belonging to this first generation of Icelandic composers were Sigvaldi Kaldalóns and Sigfús Einarsson, and Emil Thoroddsen, best known for their songs with piano accompaniment. The most significant Icelandic composer in the first half of the 20th century was Jón Leifs who studied and worked in Germany until 1944 when he fled Nazi Germany to Norway and later Iceland where he became a considerable force in Icelandic musical life. A female composer from the same period, who also studied in Germany until the beginning of the war was Jórunn Viðar.

Today, Iceland has a vibrant classical music scene, with numerous composers of contemporary music achieving international success. These include Haukur Tómasson, Anna Thorvaldsdottir, Daníel Bjarnason, Jóhann Jóhannsson and Hugi Gudmundsson.

==== Performance ====
The first proper orchestral concert in Iceland was held in 1921, in conjunction with the royal visit of Christian X of Denmark, the reigning monarch of Iceland. The ensemble created for the occasion was given the name Hljómsveit Reykjavíkur (The Reykjavík Orchestra), and performed sporadically in the years that followed under the direction of Sigfús Einarsson and Páll Ísólfsson. Following the founding of the Icelandic National Broadcasting Service in 1930, and the festivities at the 1000th anniversary of the Alþingi, and through the pioneering work of musicians like Franz Mixa, Victor Urbancic and Róbert A. Ottósson, this ensemble was slowly transformed into the professional symphony orchestra known today as the Iceland Symphony Orchestra. The orchestra resides in Harpa, Reykjavík's largest concert hall, and holds weekly concerts in its Eldborg auditorium.

Additionally, a number of musical ensembles regularly perform in Reykjavík, playing music that ranges from Baroque to contemporary music. These include the Reykjavík Chamber Orchestra, CAPUT ensemble and Nordic Affect. Several classic music festivals are held in Reykjavík and all around Iceland annually, including Dark Music Days and Reykjavík Midsummer Music.

Icelandic classical instrumentalists have achieved success internationally. Undoubtedly, the most famous Icelandic citizen within the world of classical music is the Russian pianist Vladimir Ashkenazy, who settled in Iceland with his Icelandic wife Þórunn Jóhannsdóttir in 1968, following their defection from the Soviet Union. He was awarded Icelandic citizenship in 1972. Other notable, Icelandic classical instrumentalists with international careers include Sigurbjörn Bernharðsson, violinist and member of the Pacifica Quartet, Elfa Rún Kristinsdóttir, violinist, Víkingur Ólafsson, pianist, and the cellist Sæunn Thorsteinsdóttir.

== List of Icelandic music artists ==
- Á Móti Sól
- Árstíðir
- Agent Fresco
- Amiina
- Anna Mjöll
- Apparat Organ Quartet
- Ásgeir Trausti
- Bang Gang
- Björk
- Bony Man
- Botnleðja
- Bubbi Morthens
- Daði Freyr
- Daníel Ágúst
- Dikta
- DIMMA
- Eberg
- Egó
- Emilíana Torrini
- Eurobandið
- For a Minor Reflection
- FM Belfast
- GDRN
- Glowie
- GRÓA
- GusGus
- HAM
- Hafdís Huld
- Hatari
- Hildur Guðnadóttir
- Hilmar Jensson
- Hjálmar
- Hjaltalín
- Högni
- Inki
- Jagúar
- Jakobínarína
- Jófríður Ákadóttir
- Jóhann Jóhannsson
- JóiPé
- Jónsi
- Jónsi & Alex
- Just Another Snake Cult
- Kaleo
- Katrín Lea
- Kiasmos
- Kukl
- Laufey
- Lay Low
- Leaves
- Leoncie
- Low Roar
- Magni Ásgeirsson (Rock Star Supernova)
- Maus
- Megas
- Mammút
- Mezzoforte
- Mínus
- Moses Hightower
- Mugison
- múm
- Noise
- Of Monsters and Men
- Ókindarhjarta
- Ólafur Arnalds
- Ólafur Kram
- Ólöf Arnalds
- Páll Óskar
- Parachutes
- Pascal Pinon
- Purrkur Pillnikk
- Quarashi
- Ragnheiður Gröndal
- Rökkurró
- Samaris
- Sálin hans Jóns míns
- Sigur Rós
- Sign
- Seabear
- Sin Fang
- Singapore Sling
- Skálmöld
- Skoffín
- Snorri Helgason
- Sóley
- Sólstafir
- Stafrænn Hákon
- Steed Lord
- Stjórnin
- Supersport!
- Svala Björgvinsdóttir
- Svartidauði
- The Sugarcubes
- Tappi Tíkarrass
- Teitur Magnússon
- Todmobile
- Trabant
- Una Torfa
- Utangarðsmenn
- Valdimar
- Valgeir Sigurðsson
- Vök
- Weapons
- Yaelokre
- Yohanna
- Þeyr

== National anthem ==
The national anthem of Iceland is "Lofsöngur", written by Matthías Jochumsson, with music by Sveinbjörn Sveinbjörnsson. The song, in the form of a hymn, was written in 1874, when Iceland celebrated the one thousandth anniversary of settlement on the island. It was first published under the title "A Hymn in Commemoration of Iceland's Thousand Years".

== Music institutions ==
- Iceland Music aims to aid in exporting Icelandic music abroad. It runs a website and newsletter with information about Icelandic music, with a social media presence where an audience can follow development in Icelandic music. ÚTÓN is the local wing of Iceland Music which educates musicians on matters of music promotion as well as administering funds and general consultation.
- The Music Information Center (MIC) is a national agency for contemporary and older, mostly classical, music. It is also part of the International Music Information center.
- Samtónn is an umbrella organization for Icelandic authors, performers and producers.
- Mengi in Reykjavík is a centre for avant garde music, experimental music and contemporary music. The organisation organizes performances, exhibitions, conferences and runs a recording studio and a record label.

== Festivals ==
Iceland hosts a variety of music festivals. The biggest festival is Iceland Airwaves with over 9000 guests. It takes place in the central area of Iceland's capital city Reykjavík for five days at the beginning of November. There is also an up-and-coming festival, Secret Solstice, which was held for the first time in the summer of 2014. There are also a number of intimate and transformative festivals that happen year-round in the countryside, such as Saga Fest in Selfoss and LungA Art Festival in Seyðisfjörður.

Other festivals are:

- Dark Music Days
- Erkitíð
- Sónar Reykjavík
- Reykjavik Folk Festival
- Battle of the Bands - Músíktilraunir
- AK Extreme
- Tectonics
- Reykjavík Blues Festival
- Aldrei fór ég suður
- Norðanpaunk
- Gardabaer Jazz Festival
- RAFLOST
- Reykjavík Arts Festival
- Reykjavík Music Mess
- Reykjavík Midsummer Music
- IS NORD
- Við Djúpið - Summer Courses and Music Festival
- JEA Jazz Festival
- Blue North Music Festival
- Kirkjubæjarklaustur Chamber Music Festival
- Skálholt Summer Concerts
- Folk music festival of Siglufjordur
- Rauðasandur Festival
- All Tomorrow's Parties
- The Blue Church Concert Series
- Eistnaflug
- Extreme Chill Festival
- Frum - Contemporary Music Festival
- LungA
- Saga Fest
- Reykjavik Accordion Festival
- Reykholt Music Festival
- Bræðslan
- Síldarævintýrið
- Innipúkinn
- Neistaflug
- Þjóðhátíð í Eyjum
- The Icelandic Chamber Music Festival
- Pönk á Patró
- Reykjavík Jazz Festival
- Gæran
- Tradition for tomorrow
- Reykjavik Cultural Festival
- Melodica Acoustic Festival Reykjavik
- Night of lights
- Októberfest á Íslandi
- Rokkjötnar
- Sláturtíð

== Venues ==
Concert hall Harpa held its opening concert on May 4, 2011. Bigger concerts are held in sportshalls Laugardalshöll, Egilshöll and Kórinn. Theaters such as Gamla bíó, Bæjarbíó and Iðnó are used for concerts. Austurbær is an old movie theater.

Smaller concerts are held at smaller venues or pubs located mainly around capital area, with Mengi being a central hub for progressive and experimental music.

== Record labels ==
Some of the labels mostly concentrate on one genre, whilst others are promoting many types of music. 12 Tónar and Smekkleysa run record stores in Reykjavik.

- 12 Tónar
- Bedroom Community
- Blánótt
- Ching Ching Bling Bling
- Dimma
- Dirrindí
- Geimsteinn
- Hljóðaklettar
- Kimi Records
- Kóp Boys Entertainment (KBE)
- Lady Boy Records
- Lagaffe Tales
- Mugiboogie
- Möller Records
- Record Records
- Sena
- SJS Music
- Smekkleysa SM/Bad Taste SM
- Synthadelia
- Zonet Music

== Producers and studios ==
- Bang Studio
- Greenhouse Studios
- Hljodriti (Studio Syrland Hafnarfjordur)
- Medialux HQ
- Orgelsmiðjan
- Studio Syrland
- Sundlaugin Studio
- Gryfjan
