= Ásgeirsson =

Ásgeirsson is a surname of Icelandic origin, meaning son of Ásgeir. In Icelandic names, the name is not strictly a surname, but a patronymic. The name may refer to:

- Áki Ásgeirsson (born 1975), Icelandic musician and composer
- Ásgeir Ásgeirsson (1894–1972), Icelandic politician; second president of Iceland 1952–68
- Ásgeir Gunnar Ásgeirsson (born 1980), Icelandic professional football player
- Ásmundur Ásgeirsson (1906–1986), Icelandic chess master
- Benedikt Ásgeirsson (born 1951), Icelandic diplomat; ambassador to Russia
- Magni Ásgeirsson (born 1978), Icelandic singer and songwriter
- Sturla Ásgeirsson (born 1980), Icelandic professional handball player
