= Carmina Chamber Choir =

Icelandic vocal ensemble

- Choir
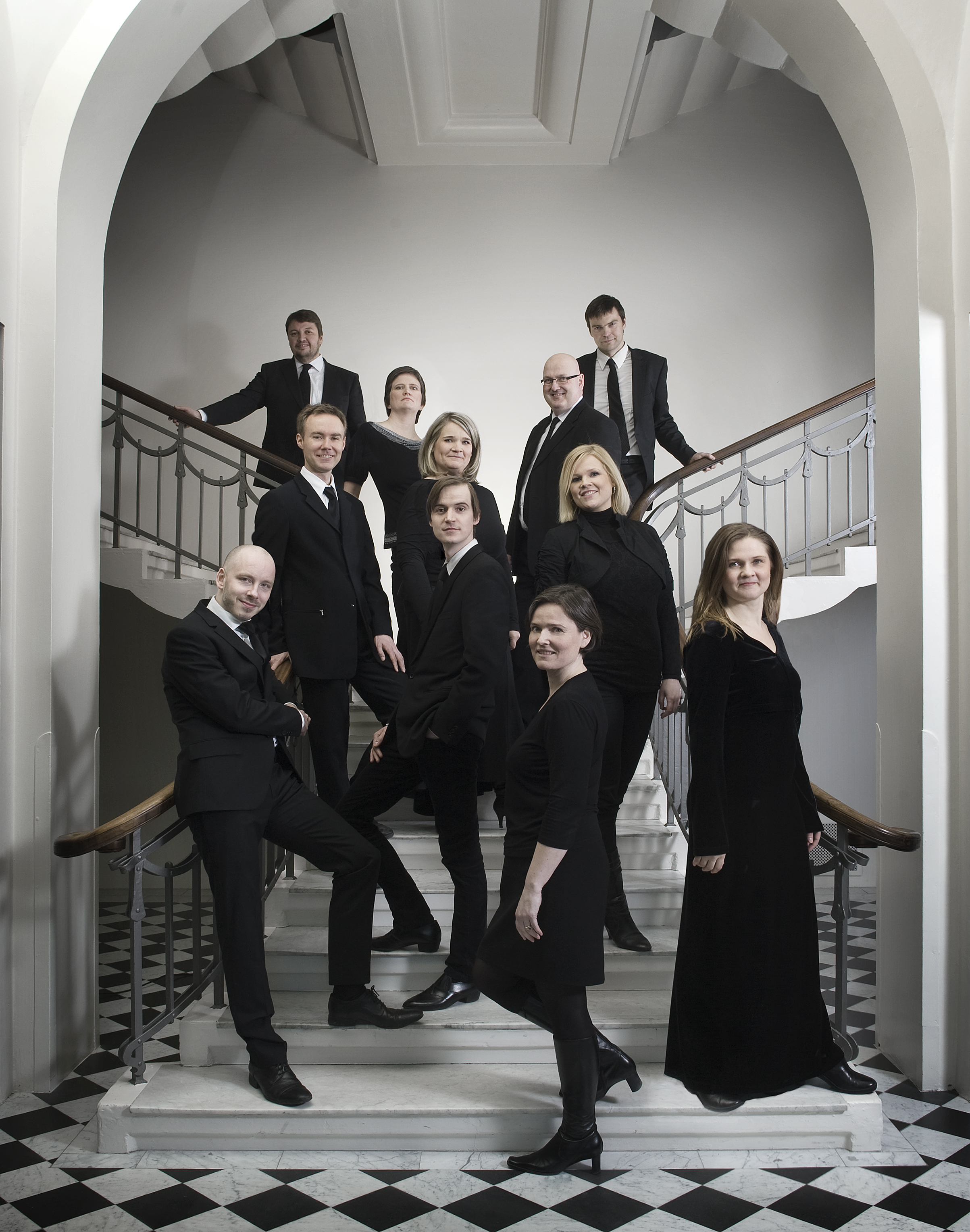
- The Carmina Chamber Choir in Reykjavík, 2010
- Origin: Iceland
- Founded: 2004
- Founder: Árni Heimir Ingólfsson
- Genre: Choral music
- Artistic Director: Árni Heimir Ingólfsson

The Carmina Chamber Choir is an Icelandic ensemble whose main focus is to perform Renaissance polyphony and music from Icelandic music manuscripts of the Renaissance and Baroque eras.

== History ==
The group was founded in 2004 by the Icelandic musicologist Árni Heimir Ingólfsson, who has been its conductor and artistic director from the beginning.

The group gave its first public concert at the Skálholt Summer Concerts in Iceland in June 2004, with a program devoted to works by Josquin des Prez. A year later, the choir presented a program, again at the Skálholt Summer Concerts, with music to texts from the Song of Songs, by Giovanni Pierluigi da Palestrina, Jacobus Clemens (non Papa), and others.

In 2007, the group released its first CD on the Smekkleysa label, with music from the Icelandic manuscript Melódía (Rask 98), written ca. 1660–70. This CD received excellent reviews, including an Editor's Choice in Gramophone magazine, where musicologist David Fallows called the project "a triumph." The CD also won the Icelandic Music Awards for Classical CD of the year, and was listed as the best classical recording of the year by the newspaper Morgunblaðið. In 2010, the ensemble released another CD with music from an Icelandic manuscript, Hymnodia sacra from 1742. Again, this CD won the Icelandic Music Awards for Classical CD of the year. It also received excellent reviews, including from Andrew Mellor in Classic FM Magazine, where he described the Carmina Chamber Choir as "one of Iceland’s foremost ensembles of its kind" and their performance on the CD as "exceptionally and attractively pure, though spiced with the bouncy, curvaceous lilt of the Icelandic language and accent." The group's latest release on digital streaming platforms is Tónlist liðinna alda (Music of Ages Past), a collection of music from Icelandic manuscripts that accompanied Árni Heimir Ingólfsson's 2019 book by the same name.

The Carmina Chamber Choir has performed widely, both in Iceland and abroad. The group has given concerts at the Stockholm Early Music Festival (2006), the Festival d’Île-de-France In Paris (2008), the Spitalfields Festival in London (2010), and Wege durch das Land in Germany (2010) to great acclaim, including a four-star review from Hilary Finch in London's The Times. In Iceland, the group has performed at the Reykjavík Arts Festival, the Við Djúpið Festival in Ísafjörður, and in 2011 it gave the EBU Christmas Concert from Reykjavík's Christ Church, which was broadcast to over 20 countries. The choir's recordings have twice been featured on full hour-long segments of BBC Radio 3's The Early Music Show, presented by Lucie Skeaping in 2007, and Hannah French in 2025.

== Recordings ==
- Melódía. An Icelandic Songbook from the Seventeenth Century. Smekkleysa SMK 56, 2007.
- Hymnodia sacra. An Icelandic Hymnal from 1742. Smekkleysa SMK 74, 2010.
- Tónlist liðinna alda. Smekkleysa, 2019.
