= Arnór Dan Arnarson =

Icelandic musician (born 1985)

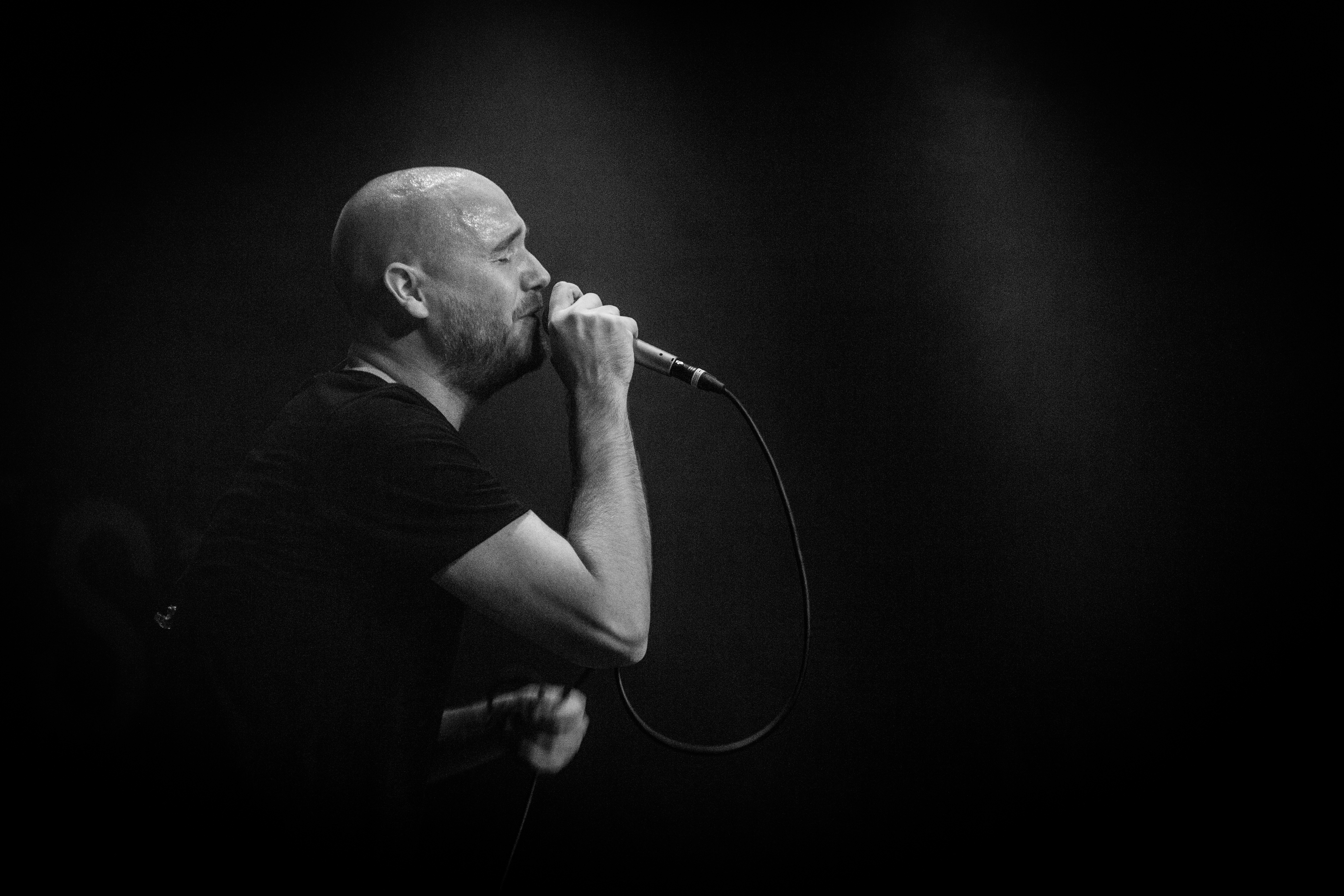
- Arnór Dan performing with Agent Fresco in 2017

Background information
- Born: 29 July 1985 (age 39); Reykjavík, Iceland
- Origin: Iceland
- Genres: Rock; progressive rock; alternative rock; ambient; indie
- Occupations: Singer-songwriter; recording artist
- Instrument: Vocals
- Member of: Agent Fresco
- Website: arnordan.com

Arnór Dan Arnarson (often credited as Arnór Dan) is an Icelandic musician best known as the lead singer of the progressive rock band Agent Fresco as well as for his collaborations with Icelandic multi-instrumentalist Ólafur Arnalds. He was selected male vocalist of the year at the Icelandic Music Awards in 2016.

== Career ==
Arnór Dan got his musical start in a high school band called Rosa. In 2008, he helped found the progressive rock band Agent Fresco, which has since released two studio albums and one EP. He has frequently collaborated with fellow Icelandic musician Ólafur Arnalds. He contributed vocals on four tracks of the latter's 2013 album, For Now I Am Winter. Also in 2013, working with Arnalds again, he contributed vocals to the song "So Close" for the British police procedural TV show Broadchurch; the song wasn't released until 2015, together with the track "So Far". In 2014, he sang several songs on the soundtrack of the TV anime Terror in Resonance. In 2017, Arnarson further contributed to the Broadchurch soundtrack, with "Take My Leave of You".

In 2018, he released his debut solo single, titled "Stone by Stone", which was co-written with Janus Rasmussen (Kiasmos) and Sakaris Emil Joensen.

== Discography ==
=== with Agent Fresco ===
Albums

- A Long Time Listening (2010)
- Destrier (2015)

EPs

- Lightbulb Universe (2008)

=== Solo ===
Singles

- "Stone by Stone" (2018)

=== Contributions ===
- "Út" Föstudagurinn Langi (Úlfur Úlfur, 2011)
- "For Now I Am Winter" For Now I Am Winter (Ólafur Arnalds, 2013)
- "A Stutter" For Now I Am Winter (Ólafur Arnalds, 2013)
- "Reclaim" For Now I Am Winter (Ólafur Arnalds, 2013)
- "Old Skin" For Now I Am Winter (Ólafur Arnalds, 2013)
- "No. Other" For Now I Am Winter (Ólafur Arnalds, 2013)
- "Von" Terror in Resonance OST (Yoko Kanno, 2014)
- "Birden" Terror in Resonance OST (Yoko Kanno, 2014)
- "Bless" Terror in Resonance OST (Yoko Kanno, 2014)
- "Akkeri" Tvær Plánetur (Úlfur Úlfur, 2015)
- "So Close" Broadchurch OST (Ólafur Arnalds, 2015)
- "So Far" Broadchurch OST (Ólafur Arnalds, 2015)
- "Say My Name" (Destiny's Child cover) Late Night Tales: Ólafur Arnalds (Ólafur Arnalds, 2016)
- "Waves" Waves – Single (Hugar, 2016)
- "Take My Leave of You" Broadchurch – The Final Chapter (Music from the Original TV Series) (Ólafur Arnalds, 2017)
- "Gravity" Made in Abyss Original Soundtrack 3 (Kevin Penkin, 2022)
