= Dikta =

Icelandic band

- Dikta in 2007. From left to right: Haukur, Jón Bjarni, Jón Þór and Skúli.

Background information
- Origin: Garðabær, Iceland
- Genres: Rock; alternative rock; indie rock; pop rock
- Years active: 1999–present
- Labels: Smekkleysa SM (Bad Taste); Kölski; Smarten Up!
- Members: Haukur Heiðar Hauksson; Jón Bjarni Pétursson; Skúli Z. Gestsson; Jón Þór Sigurðsson
- Website: www.dikta.is

Dikta is an indie rock band from Garðabær, Iceland. The band was formed in 1999 and consists of vocalist and guitarist Haukur Heiðar Hauksson, guitarist Jón Bjarni Pétursson, bassist Skúli Z. Gestsson and drummer Jón Þór Sigurðsson. Their name is an Icelandic verb meaning "to compose or make something up". Dikta has released five studio albums.

== Biography ==
=== Formation and Andartak (1999–2004) ===
Dikta was formed in Garðabær in 1999 by childhood friends Haukur Heiðar Hauksson, Jón Bjarni Pétursson, Jón Þór Sigurðsson and Skúli Z. Gestsson. The band is influenced by Radiohead, Nirvana and the Smashing Pumpkins, and were finalists in the Icelandic band competition Músíktilraunir in 2000. Dikta's debut album, Andartak, was released in late 2002. The album was self-released in Iceland by the band members through their label Mistak Records. Andartak yielded three singles, "Taminóra," "Andartak," and "Engin orð", which were all played frequently on Iceland's largest rock station at the time, X-ið 977. The album's lyrics are in Icelandic. Dikta played at the Iceland Airwaves festival for the first time in 2003 and have played there regularly since then.

=== Hunting for Happiness and Get It Together (2005–2010) ===
In 2005, Dikta released their second album, Hunting for Happiness, in Iceland, followed by releases in Denmark and the UK in 2006 and 2007 respectively. The album was produced by Martin "Ace" Kent of Skunk Anansie and was released by the Sugarcubes-owned label, Smekkleysa SM (Bad Taste). The album artwork was made by Gabríela Friðriksdóttir, who has previously collaborated extensively with Björk. Four successful singles were released off Hunting for Happiness: "Chloë", "Breaking the Waves", "Someone, Somewhere" and "Losing Every Day". Each single received heavy airplay on Iceland's rock radio stations X-FM and X-ið 977, and, with the exception of "Chloë", was also played on Iceland's national radio station, Rás 2. The album's lyrics are in English. Dikta received praise for their performance at Iceland Airwaves in 2006 from Rolling Stone senior editor David Fricke, who likened their set-closing performance of "Chloë" to a "Nirvana-like blowout."

In 2009, Dikta released their third studio album, Get It Together. Like their previous album, the lyrics are in English. The band members stated in interviews before its release that it would be a natural progression from Hunting for Happiness. The album was released in Germany, Austria and Switzerland in March 2010 by Smarten-Up!, a German indie label based in Düsseldorf. The album is certified platinum in Iceland and included the radio-hit singles "Thank You", "From Now On" and "Goodbye". In 2010, singer Hauksson featured on Ólafur Arnalds's song "A Hundred Reasons" off his album ...And They Have Escaped the Weight of Darkness. During the same year, Dikta supported The Kooks on their European tour.

=== Trust Me, Easy Street and 20th anniversary (2011–present) ===
In 2011, Dikta released their fourth album, Trust Me, following extensive touring in Europe in the past years. The album was self-produced and released by Kölski in Iceland. Dikta was interviewed for the National Geographic series Islands and performed an acoustic version of "Thank You" in 2012. In 2014, singer Hauksson performed the song "Is It Time" with Helgi Júlíus Óskarsson on the latter's collaborative album Crossroads. In 2015, Dikta released their fifth studio album, Easy Street, produced by Sky van Hoff. Easy Street was recorded in Germany and Iceland, and consisted of eleven songs. The album single "Hope for the Best" reached top five in the Icelandic charts and became the most played hit on Icelandic radio in 2015. In 2019, Dikta celebrated the anniversary of their formation with the release of the single "Anniversary". In 2022, the band released the single "Dig Deeper", produced by Sky van Hoff and Magnús Árni Øder Kristinsson. The band supported Skunk Anansie on various dates of their anniversary tour in 2022.

== Band members ==
- Haukur Heiðar Hauksson – vocals, guitar, piano
- Jón Bjarni Pétursson – guitar
- Skúli Z. Gestsson – bass, backing vocals
- Jón Þór Sigurðsson – drums

== Discography ==
=== Studio albums ===
- Andartak (2002)
- Hunting for Happiness (2005)
- Get It Together (2009)
- Trust Me (2011)
- Easy Street (2015)
