= Pascal Pinon (band) =

Icelandic musical group

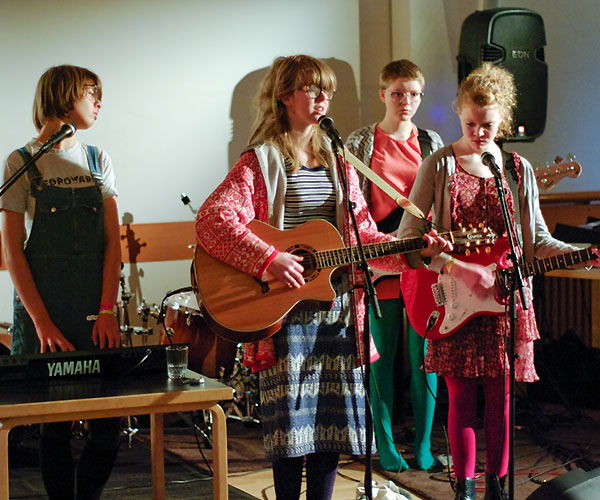
- Pascal Pinon in 2009 in the Nordic House, Reykjavík

Background information
- Origin: Reykjavík, Iceland
- Genres: Folk pop; folktronica
- Years active: 2009–present
- Label: Morr Music
- Members: Ásthildur Ákadóttir; Jófríður Ákadóttir

Pascal Pinon is a musical group from Reykjavík, Iceland consisting of twin sisters Ásthildur and Jófríður Ákadóttir.

== History ==
In 2009, when they were 14 years of age, the Ákadóttir sisters (along with Halla Kristjánsdóttir and Kristín Ylfa Hólmgrímsdóttir) formed the group. The name is a reference to the early 20th century circus performer Pasqual Piñón. The group described their music as " ...simple and honest, filled with both melancholy and optimism. We hope to make music that can inspire, soothe heartaches and warm you inside." Pascal Pinon songs are sung in their native Icelandic language as well as English. The sisters have cited Tegan and Sara, Björk, Joni Mitchell, and Sinéad O'Connor as influences. Jófríður Ákadóttir is the main songwriter and singer. She usually plays guitar and sometimes clarinet and keyboards. Ásthildur Ákadóttir sings harmony and plays various keyboards, guitar, and bassoon. The sisters have also expressed a "weak spot" for lo-fi music, cassette tape noise and toy synths. The group has performed in Europe and the UK multiple times (2010-2014, 2016, 2017), as well as giving concerts in China (2011, 2015) and Japan (2012). In 2014 the video for Bloom (directed by Alisa Kalyanova) was featured in The Guardian. In March and April, 2017, Jófríður and her cousin, Hildur Berglind Arndal, toured Europe with Hildur playing piano and singing harmony. In 2017 Albert Finnbogason produced an album of Pascal Pinon songs with string arrangements by Ian McLellan Davis and vocals by Jófríður and Ásthildur. In November 2017 Jófríður and Ásthildur reunited for a headlining concert at the Iceland Airwaves music festival, performing with a string section. Since then the duo has occasionally performed in Iceland including a filmed concert in March 2020 and at Iceland Airwaves in November, 2023. In 2026 the duo was featured in a PBS Great Performances episode on Icelandic music.

== Music ==
In 2009 they released their entirely self-produced first album, Pascal Pinon. It was re-released by the Morr Music label in 2010 and was described by Allmusic as "... a truly lovely record."

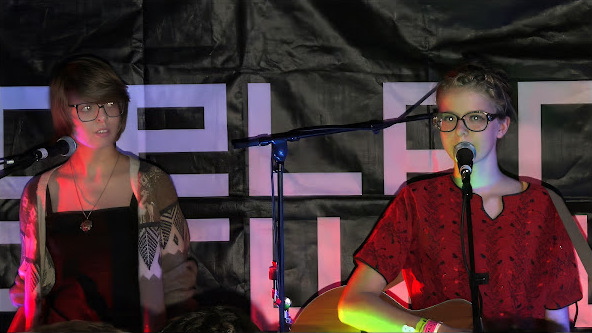
Ásthildur and Jófríður performing in Grand Rokk, Reykjavík, 2009

In January 2013 Pascal Pinon, now a duo consisting of Ásthildur and Jófríður, released their second album, Twosomeness (produced by Alex Somers). The album received an 8/10 rating from Clash, with writer Gareth James calling it "... a rare and beautiful treat... ", and it received four stars out of five from Allmusic writer Tim Sendra, who described the songs as "... very magical and wrapped in warm, slightly sad mystery... " Michael Cragg of The Guardian wrote "... these Icelandic twin sisters make gorgeously intimate songs... " In 2013, Nico Muhly named them to a New York Times "Must List" of daily music, describing their music as "... strangely catching... "

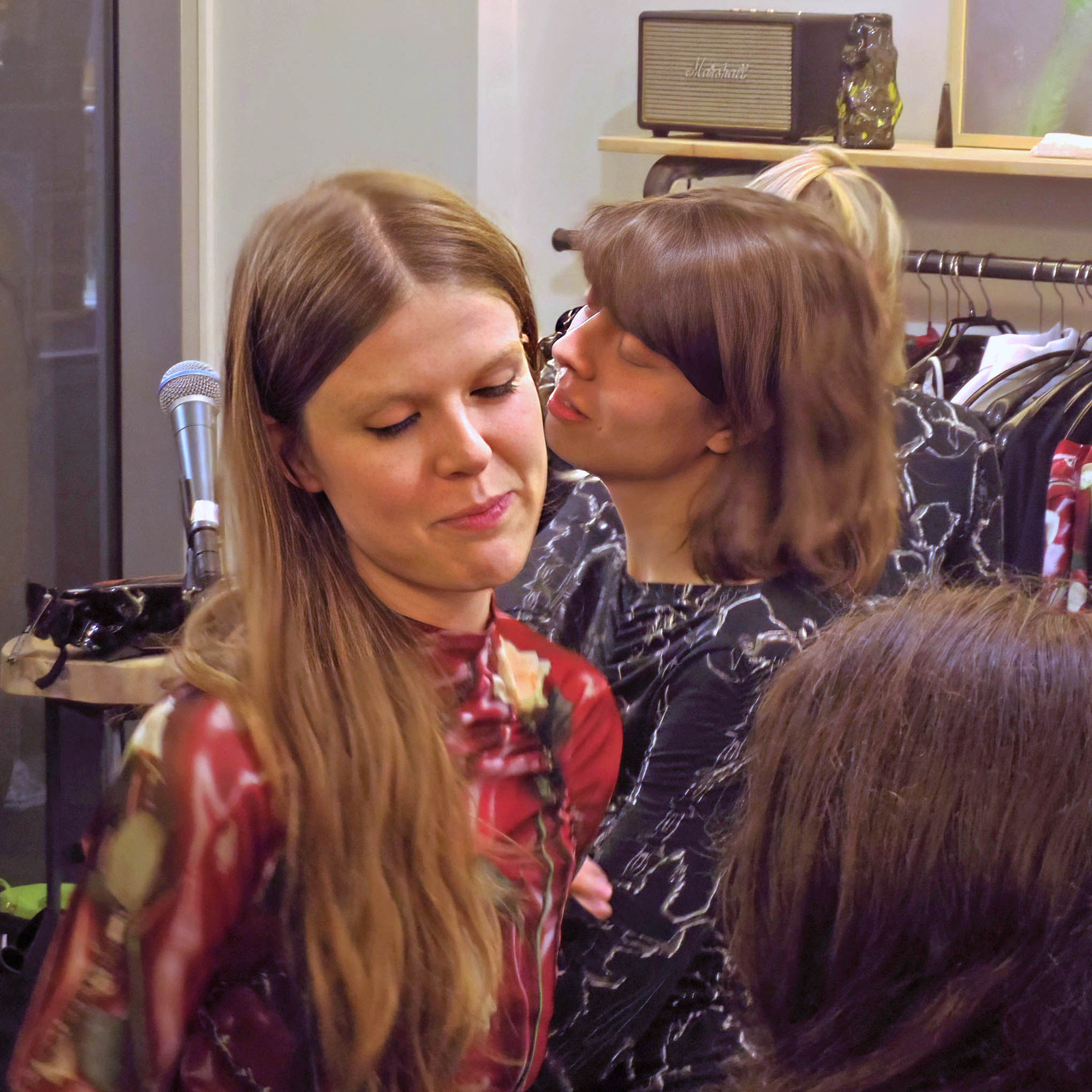
Pascal Pinon at Iceland Airwaves, 2023

In November 2015 Jófríður described their album Sundur (produced by Ásthildur) as "... raw and real, minimalistic and a bit melancholic... " After its release in 2016, reviewers praised the album: Tony Clayton-Lea in The Irish Times said that in Sundur "... the sisters manage to construct a minimal soundscape that is part sad dream, part tender magic... " Derval McCloat described Sundur as "... a stirring account of humanity, love, loss, hope and, above all, sisterhood... ", "Theirs is an imagination with few bounds, moulded by a musical skill that has learnt through experience that restraint can work to its advantage, and that less is often more... " and "... a series of magical moments at times shrouded in mystery, Sundur gives us a glimpse into the secret world of siblings, a fascinating phenomenon that transcends the physical." Sundur was featured as one of The Line of Best Fit Fifty Essential Albums of 2016. It was named as one of Play Repeat's 10 best albums of 2016. New Noise Magazine placed Sundur in their top 16 of 2016. Their song When I Can't Sleep was used in the trailer for the Apple TV+ production of Here We Are: Notes For Living on Planet Earth and in the Netflix animated film Hilda and the Mountain King.

== Related projects ==
Jófríður was also the singer for the Icelandic electronic music group Samaris. She was a member of the group Gangly and has also contributed to numerous musical projects including: Ólafur Arnalds, Muted, Lapalux, and Low Roar. In 2015 Jófríður began a solo career under the name JFDR. Ásthildur studied at the Iceland Academy of Arts with Peter Máté and Edda Erlendsdóttir and graduated in 2020 with a degree in classical piano performance. She has pursued a master's degree in teaching and also teaches piano at the Reykjavík Music School, with emphasis on improvisation and composition.

== Discography ==
=== Albums ===
- Pascal Pinon (2009), (self produced)
- Pascal Pinon (2010), Morr Music
- Twosomeness (2013), Morr Music
- Sundur (2016), Morr Music

=== EPs ===
- Pascal Pinon EP (2009) (self produced)
- I wrote a song EP (2010), A Number of Small Things
- Party Wolves EP (2012) Morr Music
- JFDR - White Sun Live. Part I : Strings (Includes Pascal Pinon songs), EP (2018) Morr Music
