= GRÓA =

Icelandic post-punk band

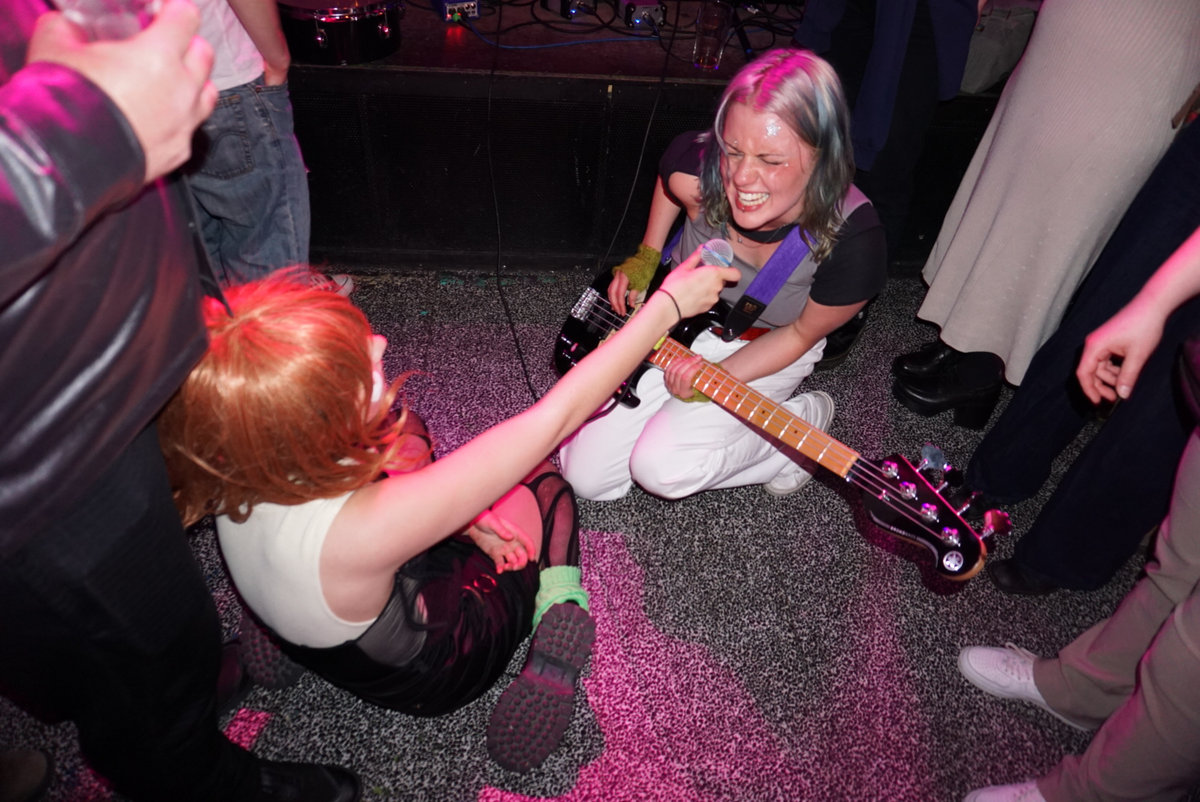
- Groa performing live

Background information
- Origin: Reykjavík, Iceland
- Genres: Punk rock, post-punk, noise rock, art pop, art punk, new wave
- Years active: 2017–present
- Labels: Post-Dreifing, Found Recordings
- Members: Karó Einars Maríudóttir; Fríða Björg Pétursdóttir; Hrabba Einars Maríudóttir
- Website: groa.bandcamp.com

GRÓA are a post-punk band from Reykjavík, Iceland. The band was founded by Karó Einars Maríudóttir (lead vocals, keys, guitar), Fríða Björg Pétursdóttir (bass, background vocals) and Hrabba Einars Maríudóttir (drums, background vocals), and has been augmented at times by other musicians.

== Background ==
Formed in Reykjavík in 2017 as teenagers, the band's first public appearance was at Músíktilraunir, an Icelandic music competition, where they made the finals. They released their first album, GRÓA, in April 2018 through Post-Dreifing, an art collective from the Reykjavík grassroots music scene.

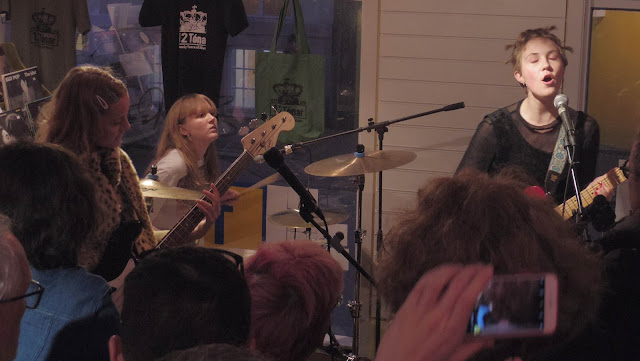
Gróa performing at 12 Tónar, Reykjavík

They performed at Icelandic Airwaves in 2019 and their set was recorded and released on YouTube by KEXP.

Bassist of Icelandic band Gróa

Their second album (Í Glimmerheimi) was released in April 2019 and their third (What I Like To Do) in August 2021) also via Post-Dreifing. Both of the later albums have also been released on US Label FOUND.

Drummer of Gróa

Whilst touring the US in 2023, their set was, again, recorded and released on YouTube by KEXP.

Singer guitarist keyboardist of Gróa

== Discography ==
=== Albums ===
- "GRÓA" (2018)
- "i Glimmerheimi" (2019)
- "Things I Like To Do" (2021)
- "Drop P" (2025)

=== Singles ===
- "Grannypants" (2022)
- "Juicy berr í leyni" (2023)
- "What I like to do" (2024)
- "Jetpackstelpan" (2024)
- "Cranberry" (2024)
- "Ugh / Beauty Tips" (2025)

=== Featured Tracks on Other Albums ===
- "The Ocean Is Amber" featured on "Drullumall 1" (Various Artists, Post-Dreifing, 2018)
- "Maria" featured on "Drullumall 2i" (Various Artists, Post-Dreifing, 2018)

== Video ==
- "GRÓA - EoEo (Live at Lucky Records, Reykjavík November 5, 2017)"
- "GRÓA - Downward Dog (Live at Lucky Records, Reykjavík November 5, 2017)"
- "Hljómsveitin Gróa (Skúrinn). Ras 2. Dec 8, 2017"
- "Groa - Lucky Records. May 8, 2018"
- "Grapevine Music Awards 2019 - Groa. January 15, 2019"
- "Silo Session #2 // GRÓA - Tralalalala. Recorded October 26, 2019"
- "GRÓA - Full Performance (Live on KEXP). Live at Kex Hostel in Reykjavík during Iceland Airwaves 2019. Recorded November 6, 2019"
- "GRÓA - Maria (Live at 12 Tónar, Reykjavík November 9, 2019)"
- "GRÓA - Tralalalala (Live at 12 Tónar, Reykjavík November 9, 2019)"
- "GRÓA - Skrímslið er að ná þér (Live at 12 Tónar, Reykjavík November 9, 2019)"
- "Korter í Flog & Gróa: Post-Sessions #1 Live at Andrými. May 31, 2020"
- "A SONG TO KILL BOYS TO - Aggression with GRÓA. May 5 2021"
- "Dansa uppá þaki -GRÓA. April 30 2021"
- "GRÓA - Live at KUZE Potsdam. October 22, 2021"
- "GRÓA - Live at KUZE Potsdam. October 22, 2021"
- "GRÓA @ Windmill Brixton. June 18, 2022"
- "GRÓA @ Windmill Brixton. June 9, 2023"
- "Gróa - (live in Hájovňa). August 28, 2023"
- "GRÓA - Full Performance (Live on KEXP). Live in the KEXP studio. Recorded October 5, 2023"
- "Gróa at Lucky Records - Iceland Airwaves 2023. November 9, 2023"
- "GRÓA - Juicy berr í leyni. December 9 2023"
- "GRÓA - What I like to do. January 26, 2024"
- "GRÓA - Jetpackstelpan. February 16, 2024"
- "Gróa - hvaða lag? Live @ Norðanpaunk 2024. September 2, 2024"
- "GRÓA @ Windmill Brixton. March 4, 2025"
- "GRÓA - Ugh. April 30, 2025"
