= Iceland Airwaves =

Annual music festival in Reykjavík, Iceland

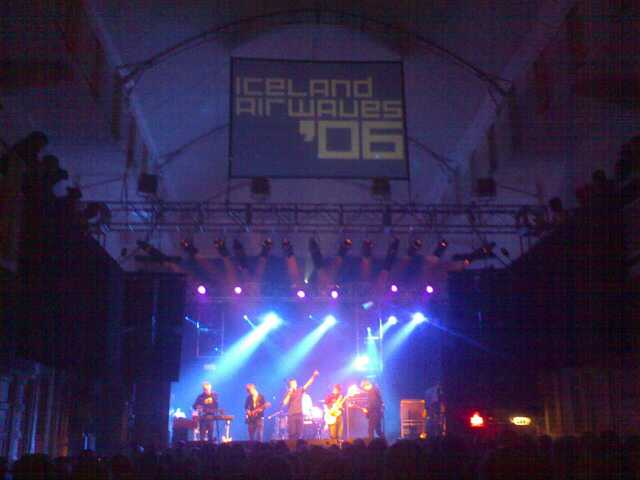
- Iceland Airwaves 2006
- Genre: Electronic; rock; hip hop; folk; pop; R&B; soul; ambient; punk
- Dates: November
- Locations: Reykjavík, Iceland
- Years active: 1999–present
- Website: icelandairwaves.is

Iceland Airwaves is a music festival held annually in November in Reykjavík, Iceland, since 1999. Its main focus is showcasing new music, both Icelandic and international.

== Background ==
The event is promoted and produced by Iceland Music Export and sponsored by its founder, Icelandair, in cooperation with the City of Reykjavík. In February 2018, the event managing company, Sena Live, bought the logo and all associated trademarks of Iceland Airwaves.

== History ==
The first festival was held in October 1999 as a one-off event in an airplane hangar at Reykjavík Airport. In 2014, the event switched to being held in November.

In 2018, 50% of the performers at Iceland Airwaves were female, making the festival one of the first to include gender equality in its lineup.

In 2020 and 2021, the festival was cancelled due to the COVID-19 pandemic. It was held in 2022 and 2023, with a three-day schedule instead of four, as in previous years.

== Partial list of performers ==
Full lineups available on official website

- 22-Pistepirkko
- Agent Fresco
- Alex Metric
- The Antlers
- Apparat Organ Quartet
- Architecture in Helsinki
- Aurora
- Austra
- Beach House
- Björk
- Black Midi
- The Bravery
- Clap Your Hands Say Yeah
- Crystal Castles
- Daði Freyr
- Dikta
- Efterklang
- Everything Everything
- Fatboy Slim
- Flaming Lips
- Fleet Foxes
- Florence and the Machine
- FM Belfast
- GusGus
- Hatari
- Hercules and Love Affair
- Hjaltalín
- Hot Chip
- Hurts
- JFDR
- jj
- Jóhann Jóhannsson
- Joy Formidable
- Junip
- Kaiser Chiefs
- Keane
- The Kills
- Klaxons
- Madame Gandhi
- Mount Kimbie
- múm
- Of Monsters and Men
- Oh No Ono
- Ólafur Arnalds
- Ólöf Arnalds
- Other Lives
- Paul Oscar
- Pascal Pinon
- The Rapture
- Ratatat
- Retro Stefson
- Robyn
- Rolo Tomassi
- Samaris
- Seabear
- Sigur Rós
- Sinéad O'Connor
- Singapore Sling
- Slagsmalsklubben
- sóley
- Sólstafir
- Sparta
- The Stills
- Sturle Dagsland
- Thievery Corporation
- Timber Timbre
- Toro Y Moi
- Tune-Yards
- TV on the Radio
- Tunng
- Vampire Weekend
- We Were Promised Jetpacks
- Wolf Parade
- Yoko Ono

== See also ==
- List of music festivals
