= Hymnodia sacra =

Manuscript of 18th-century Icelandic music

Hymnodia sacra is an Icelandic manuscript hymnal, written in 1742 by Guðmundur Högnason, a priest in the Westman Islands (Vestmannaeyjar), just south of mainland Iceland. This manuscript is considered one of the most important sources of music in eighteenth-century Iceland.

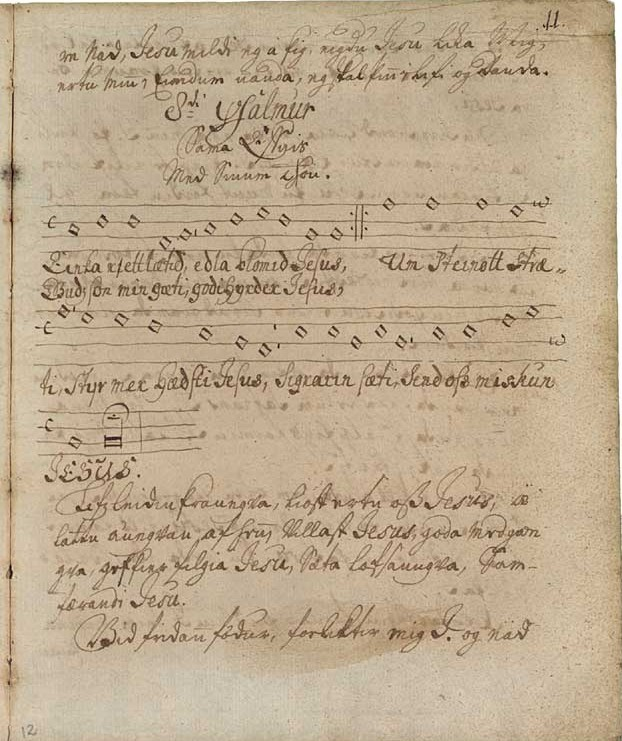
Excerpt from Hymnodia sacra, Icelandic 18th-century hymnal with music.

== History and contents ==
The manuscript is the work of Guðmundur Högnason (1713-1795), a priest. The manuscript contains 256 hymns, including 101 with musical notation. This makes it the largest surviving source of notated music from 18th-century Iceland. Högnason must himself have been knowledgeable in music. He studied at the Latin school in Skálholt from 1728-1734, and among his teachers there was bishop Jón Árnason, who was a knowledgeable musician in addition to his clerical duties.

The Icelandic musicologist Árni Heimir Ingólfsson has suggested that Högnason intended the manuscript to serve as a model for a new printed hymnal, and therefore sent it to the bishopric at Hólar in northern Iceland, where all the country's books were printed. While Hymnodia sacra was not printed in its entirety, it did serve as an important model for a new Icelandic hymnal, known as Höfuðgreinabókin, published at Hólar in 1772.

Hymnodia sacra contains music from a variety of different sources. Some of its melodies are commonly known from German/Danish hymnody, while others come from the songbook of the Icelandic priest Ólafur Jónsson of Sandar (d. 1627), and the popular hymnals of the Danish poet-bishop Thomas Kingo. A third of the tunes in Hymnodia sacra cannot be found in any other source. The manuscript is now part of the collection at the National and University Library in Reykjavík, and bears the shelfmark Lbs 1927 4to.

The music of Hymnodia sacra was first printed in Íslenzk þjóðlög, a collection of Icelandic music published by Bjarni Þorsteinsson in 1906-1909. In the later 20th century, composers and performers began arranging some of the songs for performance. For example, choral arrangements by composer Þorkell Sigurbjörnsson of the songs Immanúel oss í nátt and Hvað flýgur mér í hjartað blítt have been frequently performed by Icelandic and foreign choirs.

In 2010, the Carmina Chamber Choir released an entire CD devoted to music from the manuscript, in editions prepared by Árni Heimir Ingólfsson. This CD won the Icelandic Music Award for Classical CD of the year, and was highly praised by critics. For example, Ríkarður Örn Pálsson called the disc "exceptional" and praised the "golden touch" of the performers, while Andrew Mellor noted that "everything is exceptionally and attractively pure, though spiced with the bouncy, curvaceous lilt of the Icelandic language and accent." In Fanfare Magazine, J.F. Weber called the voices "fresh and charming," and noted that the "whole effect is so subdued as to be entrancing."

== Recordings ==
Hátíð fer að höndum ein (includes Immanúel oss í nátt and Frábæra, bæra). Þrjú á palli. SG hljómplötur, 1971.

Íslenskir jólasöngvar og Maríukvæði (includes Immanúel oss í nátt and Hvað flýgur mér í hjartað blítt). The Hamrahlíð Choir, dir. Þorgerður Ingólfsdóttir. Iceland Music Information Center, 1996.

Hymnodia sacra. Carmina Chamber Choir and Nordic Affect, dir. Árni Heimir Ingólfsson, Smekkleysa SMK 74, 2010.

Tónlist liðinna alda. Carmina Chamber Choir, dir. Árni Heimir Ingólfsson. Smekkleysa, 2019.
