= Didier Lupi Second =

French composer (c. 1520 – after 1559)

Didier Lupi Second (c.1520-after 1559) was a French composer, likely of Italian origin, based in Lyons. In 1548, he published Chansons Spirituelles with the poet Guéroult, the first such important publication of its kind by a Protestant. It includes Susanne un jour, a composition which was arranged by many later composers. He also published collections of psalms, secular chansons and other works.

== Works ==
Selected works include:

- Dame qui au plaisant son
- O que je vis un estrange martyre
- Susanne un jour d'amour sollicitée
