= Melódía (Rask 98) =

17th century Icelandic music manuscript

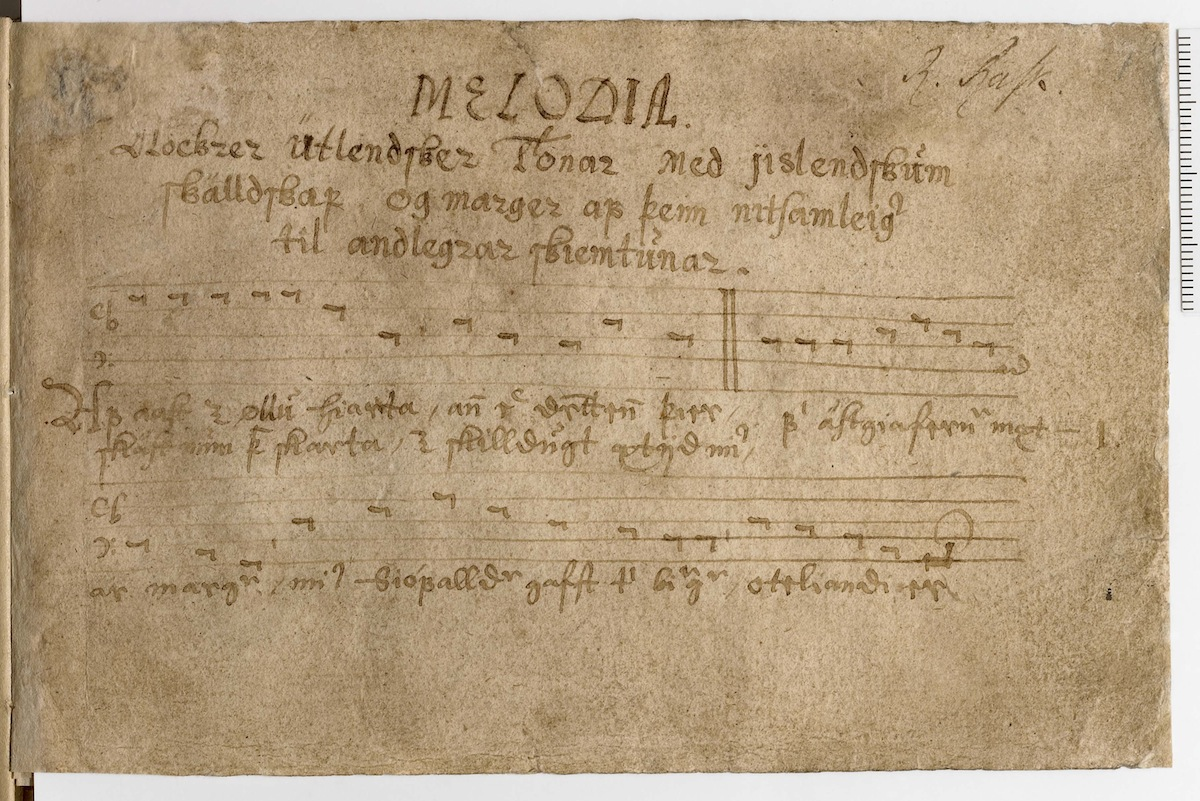
The title page of the manuscript Melódía (Rask 98).

Melódía (or Rask 98) is an Icelandic music manuscript from the seventeenth century. Believed to be written in ca. 1660–70, it contains 223 songs and is the largest and most important surviving Icelandic music manuscript from the early modern period.

== History ==
While the origins of the manuscript are unknown, it has been suggested by the Icelandic musicologist Árni Heimir Ingólfsson that it was written in (or at least has some connection with) the bishopric at Skálholt in southern Iceland. In the early nineteenth century, the manuscript came into the possession of the Danish scholar Rasmus Rask, and after his death it was purchased by the University of Copenhagen. It is today part of the collection of the Arnamagnæan Institute at the University of Copenhagen.

The manuscript contains a wide variety of songs. Some of them may originate in Iceland, while others were certainly brought to Iceland from abroad. Among the songs found in the manuscript are the well-known French chanson Susanne un jour, and songs by Paul Hofhaimer, Ludwig Senfl, Jacobus Clemens, and Francesco Corteccia. The songbook also contains music in more archaic styles, such as two-part versions of plainchant, including the Easter sequence Victimae paschali laudes.

The manuscript's heading, on its first page, is "MELÓDÍA. A few foreign tones With Icelandic poetry, and many of them useful for spiritual enjoyment." While most of the texts are indeed in Icelandic, a few are in Latin. The contents of the manuscript can be divided into six main sections: Sacred songs; Secular songs; Various songs; Songs from the Songbook of Rev. Ólafur Jónsson; Various songs; Songs from the 1619 Hymnal.

In recent years, attention has been brought to the importance of the manuscript and many Icelandic ensembles have included songs from it on their programs and recordings. Among these is a CD by the Carmina Chamber Choir which was fully devoted to songs from this manuscript. It won the Icelandic Music Award for Best Classical CD in 2008 and was an "Editor's Choice" CD of the Month in Gramophone magazine.

== Editions ==
While no complete edition of the manuscript exists, most of the songs were published by Bjarni Þorsteinsson in his groundbreaking study, Íslensk þjóðlög (Copenhagen, 1906–09). Here, however, the songs are printed in rhythmic note-values, unlike the presentation in the manuscript itself. Also, Þorsteinsson was unaware of the historical origins of many of the songs. In 2024, a scholarly edition of Part 4 of the manuscript, that containing songs from the "songbook" of Rev. Ólafur Jónsson of Sandar (ca. 1560–1627) was published as Söngbók séra Ólafs Jónssonar á Söndum. Several songs from the manuscript are also included in Syng mín sál: 40 söngvar úr íslenskum handritum fyrri alda, an edition of 40 songs from various Icelandic sources published in 2025.

== Selected recordings ==
- Melódía. An Icelandic Songbook From the Seventeenth Century. Carmina Chamber Choir, cond. Árni Heimir Ingólfsson. Smekkleysa SMK 56, 2007.
- Ljómalind. Spilmenn Rikínís (Marta G. Halldórsdóttir, Örn Magnússon, et al.). Smekkleysa, SMK 66, 2009.
- Tónlist liðinna alda. Carmina Chamber Choir and Benedikt Kristjánsson, cond. Árni Heimir Ingólfsson. Smekkleysa 2019.
