= Samaris (band) =

Icelandic band

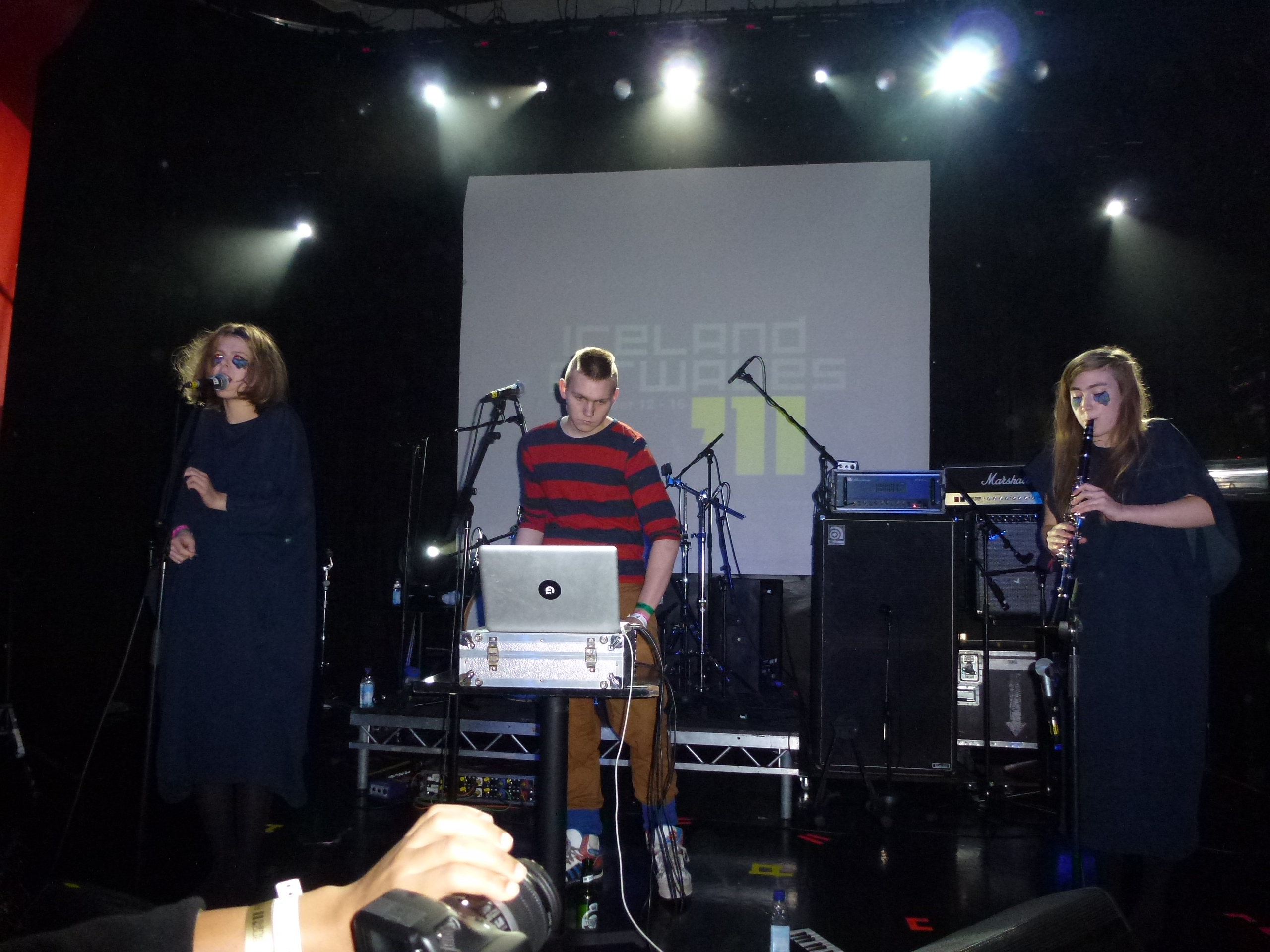
- Samaris performing in 2011

Background information
- Origin: Iceland
- Genres: Electronic; downtempo
- Years active: 2011–present
- Labels: 12 Tónar; One Little Indian
- Members: Áslaug Rún Magnúsdóttir; Þórður Kári Steinþórsson; Jófríður Ákadóttir
- Website: samaris.is

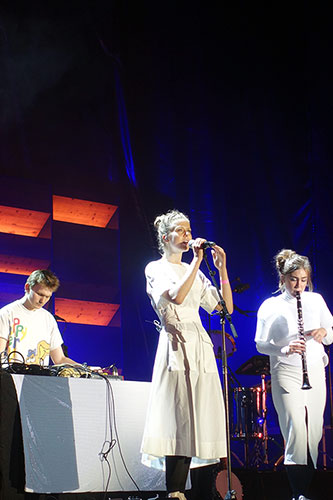
Samaris at Aarhus Festival 2015

Samaris is an electronic music group from Iceland which formed in January 2011 and consists of Áslaug Rún Magnúsdóttir (clarinet), Þórður Kári Steinþórsson (electronics) and Jófríður Ákadóttir (vocals).

== History ==
After forming in January 2011, Samaris entered and won the 2011 Icelandic Músíktilraunir competition. Steinþórsson also won the Keyboard/Programmer prize. Following this, the group self-released their Hljóma Þú (2011) EP, which won the band an Icelandic Kraumur award. In August 2011, Samaris took part in a Stage Europe Network event in The Netherlands which brought together acts from Norway, The Netherlands, Poland, France, Germany and Iceland. In October 2011, Samaris performed at the Iceland Airwaves festival.

A further self-released EP, Stofnar falla, followed in 2012 before the group signed with One Little Indian Records. The band performed at the 2012 Iceland Airwaves festival.

Samaris's self-titled debut album was released in July 2013, which combined the tracks from their two previous EPs along with four remixes, to generally favourable reviews. The album combined their music with lyrics taken from 19th-century Icelandic poems.

The follow-up album Black Lights (2016), which had been recorded in Berlin the year prior, marks their switch to making music in English. It was headed up by the release of the lead-single "Wanted 2 Say" in April, 2016.

In 2017, lead singer Jófríður Ákadóttir was featured on Low Roar's single, "Bones", from their upcoming album Once In A Long, Long While.

== Discography ==
=== Studio albums ===
- Samaris (2013), One Little Indian
- Silkidrangar (2014), One Little Indian
- Silkidrangar Sessions (2015), One Little Indian
- Black Lights (2016), One Little Indian

=== Extended plays ===
- Hljóma Þú (2011), self-released
- Stofnar falla (2012), self-released

=== Singles ===
- "Góða tungl" (2013), One Little Indian
- "Viltu vitrast" (2013), One Little Indian
- "Ég vildi fegin verða" (2014), One Little Indian
- "Brennur Stjarna" (2014), One Little Indian
- "Wanted 2 Say" (2016), One Little Indian
