= Botnleðja =

Icelandic rock band

- Origin: Hafnafjörður, Iceland
- Genres: Alternative rock, Britpop, indie rock, grunge, punk rock, alternative metal
- Years active: 1994-2004, 2011-
- Labels: Rymur, R&R músik, Error músík, Spik
- Members: Heiðar Örn Kristjánsson; Ragnar Páll Steinsson; Haraldur Freyr Gíslason

Botnleðja ('Silt') is an Icelandic rock band formed in 1994. They gained popularity when they won the Músíktilraunir, an Icelandic "battle between the bands" competition in 1995. The band members are guitarist and singer Heiðar Örn Kristjánsson, bass-guitarist Ragnar Páll Steinsson, and drummer Haraldur Freyr Gíslason. Heiðar and Haraldur are also band members of 'Hafnarfjarðarmafían' ('The Hafnarfjörður Mob'), a support band of the Icelandic FH football team and Pollapönk.

The band Blur, who had been recording their self-titled album Blur in Iceland in 1997, were fans of Botnleðja. Their hit song "Song 2" borrowed the catchy "woo-hoo" from Botnleðja's 'Þið eruð Frábær'. Later that year Botnleðja joined Blur on their UK tour.

== Discography ==
=== Albums ===
- 1995: Drullumall
- 1996: Fólk er Fífl
- 1998: Magnyl
- 2000: Douglas Dakota
- 2003: Iceland National Park
- 2013: Þegar öllu er á botninn hvolft

=== Singles ===
- 2013: "Panikkast"
- 2013: "Slóði"
