= Áki Ásgeirsson =

Icelandic composer and musician (born 1975)

Áki Ásgeirsson (born 1975) is an Icelandic composer and musician. He has written instrumental music and music for instruments and computer.

Ásgeirsson was born in Garður. He studied at the Keflavík Music School, the Reykjavík College of Music and the Royal Conservatory in The Hague, The Netherlands and currently lives in Reykjavík.

His music has been performed by the Iceland Symphony Orchestra and musicians such as Michael Manion and the Norwegian POING ensemble. His music has been performed in China, Russia, Denmark, Norway, Sweden, Finland, Iceland, Greenland, the Faroe Islands, The Netherlands, Germany and various places in the United States of America.

Áki has been active as a trumpet player, mostly with experimental improvisation ensembles. He developed the SensorTrumpet, an electronic trumpet with add-ons to interact with a computer.

Software projects include GeMusE, a realtime interactive notation rendering program. It eliminates the use of paper in music performance, replacing it with a VGA monitor (LCD or a video projector), which allows the performer to interact instantly with the score.

Áki is a co-founder of Aton Ensemble, S.l.a.t.u.r. (an Icelandic composers' group), Saeborg (an improvisation unit), Kokteilsosa (a concert series) and other bands and institutions.

Áki's daughter Jófríður Ákadóttir is also a musician.
