= Stockholm Early Music Festival =

Historical music event

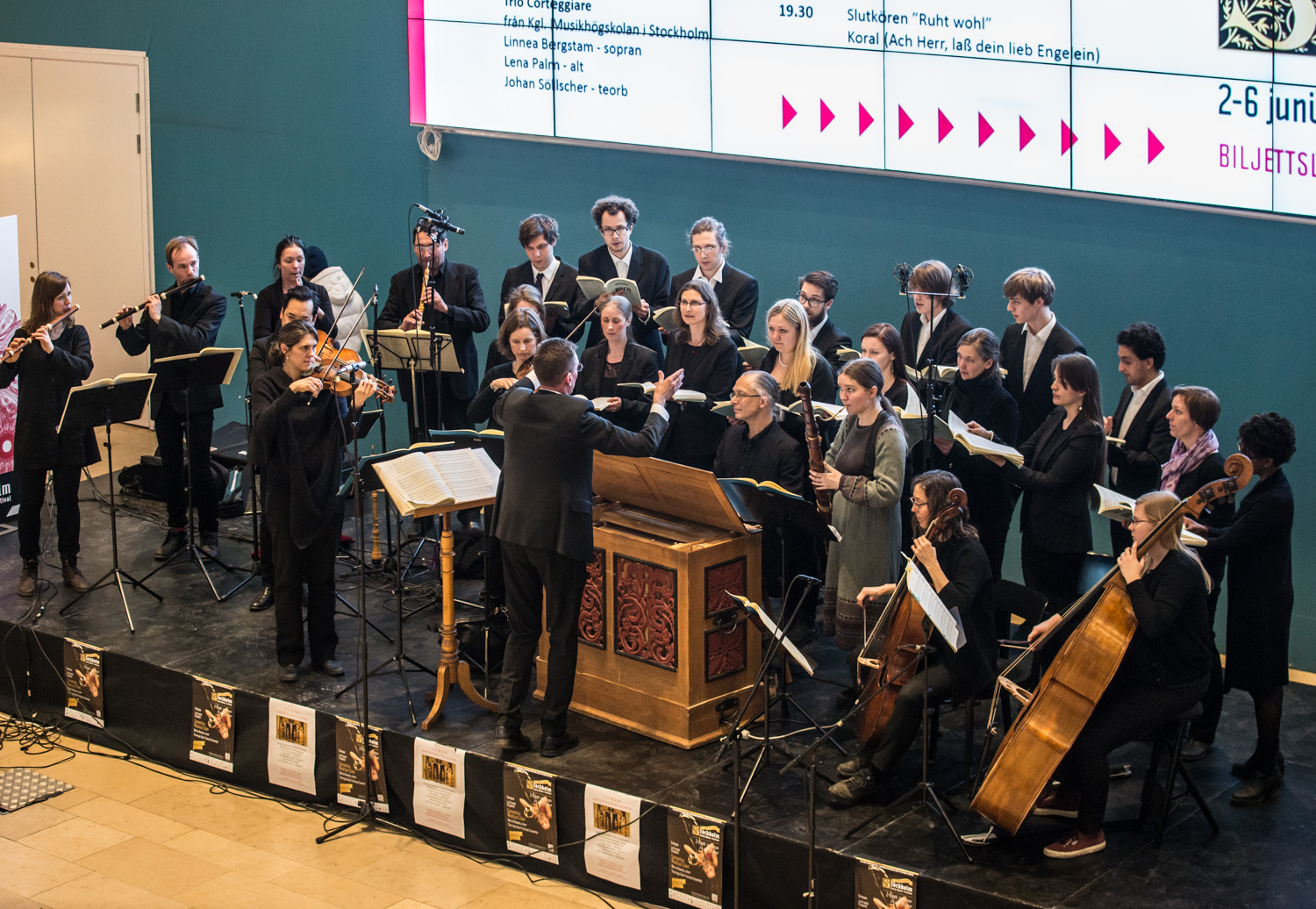
- It´s never too late for early music.
- Genre: Early music
- Dates: First week in June every year.
- Locations: Stockholm, Sweden
- Years active: 2002 and ongoing
- Founders: Peter Pontvik
- Capacity: about 5000
- Organiser: The largest international event for historical music in the Nordic countries.
- Website: SEMF.se

Stockholm Early Music Festival (SEMF) is the Nordic region's largest international festival for early music, which since 2002 takes place in early June every year in Stockholm, Sweden. SEMF lasts for a week and focuses on repertoire from Medieval music, Renaissance music and Baroque music. The musicians and singers come from all over the world. The festival also offers a number of seminars. Stockholm Early Music Festival is under the auspices of Queen Silvia. The founder and main person responsible for the festival is the composer and music researcher Peter Pontvik. SEMF also arranges the festival SEMF Christmas Edition, European Day of Early Music (on the 21st of March) and various concert activities all year round under the name Early Music Live!.

== Concert halls ==
Stockholm Early Music Festival's concerts and seminars are organized in The German Church (Swe: Tyska kyrkan), The Finish Church (Swe: Finska kyrkan), The Great Church / The Cathedral Parish Hall (Swe: Storkyrkosalen), (Swe: Storkyrkosalen), The Royal Armoury (Swe: Livrustkammaren), The Medieval Museum (Swe: Medeltidsmuseet) and Mästerolofsgården. All located the Old Town of Stockholm.

== Artists ==
Over the years, SEMF has been visited by many early music artists from various countries, including:

Jordi Savall (Spain), Andreas Scholl (Germany), Philippe Jaroussky (France), Les Arts Florissants (France), Anonymous 4 (USA), Freiburger Barockorchester (Germany), Collegium Musicum Wien (Austria), The Tallis Scholars (Great Britain), Il Giardino Armonico (Italy) Huelgas Ensemble (Belgium), Ensemble Villancico (Sweden), Ton Kooopman & Tini Mathot (Netherlands), L'Arpeggiata with Doron Sherwin (Europe), Operabyrån (Sweden), Marco Beasley (Italy), Swedish Vocal Harmony, Lisa Rydberg & Gunnar Idenstam (Sweden), Gothenburg Baroque (Sweden) (Swe: Göteborg Baroque), Swedish Radio Choir (Swe: Radiokören), Ida Falk-Winland (Sweden), Les Paladins (France), Nigel North (England), Trio Mediaeval (Norway), Concentus Musicus Wien (Austria), Sarband (Germany), Elyma (Switzerland), Drottningholms Barockensemble (Sweden), Maria-Christina Kiehr (Switzerland), L'Eventail (France), Hans-Ola Ericsson (Sweden), Kudsi Erguner (Turkey), Dialogos (Croatia), Ensemble Inegal (Czech), L’Aura Rilucente (Hungary), Fader Seraphim (Georgia), Gogochuri Sisters (Georgia), Skip Sempé (USA), Benedek Csalog (Hungary), Orfeus Barockensemble (Sweden), Ensemble Mare Nostrum with conductor Andrea de Carlo (Italy), Ricercar Consort (Belgium) and many more.

Some of the concerts have been broadcast by the BBC.

== Cultural policy work and international profiling ==
SEMF operates at the cultural policy level and at the forefront of a number of early music actors in Sweden. The aim is to create a national center and stage for early music and dance. The focus for this purpose is Stockholm's oldest concert hall The Musical Palace (Swe: Musikaliska) built in 1878 at Nybrokajen 11.

In 2006, SEMF laid the foundations for the Nordic-Baltic Early Music Network (NORDEM) and has chaired its counterpart European Early Music Network (REMA) (Fra: Réseau Européen de Musique Ancienne) during the years 2011–2015. The festival's artistic director Peter Pontvik is also the initiator of European Day of Early Music.
