= Ásgeir Gunnar Ásgeirsson =

Icelandic footballer

Ásgeir Ásgeirsson
Personal information
- Full name: Ásgeir Gunnar Ásgeirsson
- Date of birth: 3 June 1980 (age 46)
- Place of birth: Iceland
- Height: 1.78 m (5 ft 10 in)
- Position: Midfielder

Youth career
- FH

College career
Years	Team	Apps	(Gls)
2001	Furman Paladins		

Senior career*
Years	Team	Apps	(Gls)
1997–2000	Stjarnan	43	(2)
2002–2011	FH	123	(19)
2012	Fram	16	(1)

International career^{‡}
2007	Iceland	3	(0)
- * Club domestic league appearances and goals as of 11 December 2022 ‡ National team caps and goals as of 11 December 2022

Ásgeir Gunnar Ásgeirsson (born 3 June 1980) is an Icelandic former footballer who capped three times for the Iceland national team.

== Playing career ==
After starting his career with Stjarnan, he joined FH prior to the 2002 season. He played with FH until 2011, scoring 19 goals in 123 league matches.

In March 2012, Ásgeir joined Fram . He appeared in 16 league matches for the team, scoring once. A practicing dentist since 2010, he announced his retirement from football in January 2013 to focus on furthering his education in the field.
