= Destrier (album) =

Studio album by Agent Fresco
- Released: August 7, 2015
- Recorded: September 2013 – December 2014
- Studio: E7, Ginger Palace, Hljóðriti, Orgelsmiðjan, Ómstöðin, Finnland Studios
- Genre: Progressive rock; art rock; math rock
- Length: 51:08
- Label: Long Branch Records

Agent Fresco chronology
A Long Time Listening (2010)	Destrier (2015)

Destrier is the second album by rock band Agent Fresco.

== Critical reception ==
The album was well received by critics.

Professional ratings
Review scores
Source	Rating
Time for Metal	10/10
Ghost Cult Magazine	8.5/10
It Djents	10/10
NordicMusicreview	9/10
Kaaoszine	9/10
Lords of Metal	95/100
Metalfan.nl	90/100
Mpodia	8/10

== Track listing ==
No.	Title	Length
1.	"Let Them See Us"	3:45
2.	"Dark Water"	3:38
3.	"Pyre"	3:33
4.	"Destrier"	2:20
5.	"Wait for Me"	4:00
6.	"Howls"	3:03
7.	"The Autumn Red"	4:48
8.	"Citadel"	1:29
9.	"See Hell"	4:20
10.	"Let Fall the Curtain"	2:40
11.	"Bemoan"	4:00
12.	"Angst"	1:36
13.	"Death Rattle"	4:55
14.	"Mono no Aware"	7:01
Total length:		51:08

iTunes/Bandcamp bonus track
No.	Title	Length
15.	"Stillness" (Bonus Track)	4:25

== Personnel ==
Musical performers

- Arnór Dan Arnarson – vocals
- Hrafnkell Örn Guðjónsson – drums, percussion
- Vignir Rafn Hilmarsson – bass, upright bass
- Þórarinn Guðnason – guitar, piano, programming
- Viktor Orri Árnason, Þórarinn Guðnason – string arrangements
- Viktor Orri Árnason – strings
- Bergur Þórisson – brass

Additional personnel

- Agent Fresco, Styrmir Hauksson – production
- Styrmir Hauksson – engineering
- Bergur Þórisson, Þórarinn Guðnason – additional engineering
- Styrmir Hauksson – mixing
- Glenn Schick – mastering
- Dóri Andrésson – art direction, graphic design
- Marino Thorlacius – photography

== Year-end charts ==
Chart (2016)	Position
Icelandic Albums (Plötutíóindi)	87
