= Vök =

Icelandic band

- Origin: Reykjavík, Iceland
- Genres: Dream pop; indietronica; trip hop
- Years active: January 2013–present
- Labels: Record Records; Nettwerk
- Members: Margrét Magnúsdóttir; Einar Stefánsson; Bergur Dagbjartsson
- Past members: Andri Enoksson (2013–2019); Ólafur Ólafsson (2013–2018)

Vök are an Icelandic dream pop and indietronica band from Reykjavík. The band was formed in January 2013 by singer Margrét Magnúsdóttir and saxophonist Andri Enoksson after two years of working together. The name "Vök" was suggested by Enoksson. In March that year, the band performed at and won Músíktilraunir, an annual music contest in Iceland. In mid-2013, Vök was joined by guitarist Ólafur Ólafsson. As of March 2019, the band's line-up consists of Margrét, Einar Stefánsson and Bergur Dagbjartsson.

== Discography ==
=== Albums ===
| Title | Details |
|---|---|
| Figure | Released: 28 April 2017; Label: Nettwerk, Record Records (IS); Formats: CD, digital download, vinyl |
| In the Dark | Released 1 March 2019; Label: Nettwerk, Record Records (IS); Formats: CD, digital download, vinyl |
| Vök | Released 23 September 2022; Label: Nettwerk; Formats: Digital download |

=== Extended plays ===
| Title | Details |
|---|---|
| Tension | Released: 7 August 2013; Label: Record Records; Formats: CD, digital download, vinyl |
| Circles | Released: 22 May 2015; Label: Record Records; Formats: CD, digital download, vinyl |
| Feeding On A Tragedy | Released: 8 October 2021; Label: Record Records; Formats: CD, digital download, vinyl |

=== Singles ===
| Title | Year | Album |
|---|---|---|
| "Waiting" | 2016 | Non-album single |

== Band members ==
=== Current members ===
- Margrét Rán Magnúsdóttir – lead vocals, keyboard, guitar, synthesiser (2013–present)
- Einar Hrafn Stefánsson – guitar, bass guitar (2013–present)
- Bergur Einar Dagbjartsson – drums, percussion (2019–present)

=== Touring members ===
- Jón Valur Guðmundsson – percussion (2014–2015)
- Guðrún Veturliðadóttir – guitar, bass guitar (2018)

=== Past members ===
- Andri Már Enoksson – saxophone (2013–2019)
- Ólafur Alexander Ólafsson – guitar, bass guitar (2013–2018)
