= Á Móti Sól =

Icelandic pop band

- Origin: Iceland
- Genres: Pop; Europop
- Years active: 1995–present
- Members: Magni Ásgeirsson; Heimir Eyvindarson; Sævar Þór Helgason; Þórir Gunnarsson; Stefán I. Þórhallsson
- Past members: Björgvin Hreiðarsson; Sæmundur Sigurðsson; Ingólfur Arnar Þorvaldsson
- Website: amotisol.is

Á Móti Sól is an Icelandic pop band formed in the fall of 1995 by Þórir Gunnarsson and Heimir Eyvindarson. Stefán Þórhallsson joined the band in the spring of 1997, Sævar Þór Helgason in the spring of 1998, and Magni Ásgeirsson in the fall 1999.

== Records and performances ==
Most of Á Móti Sól's members come from, and continue to be based out of, the south Iceland region that includes the towns of Hveragerði and Selfoss, about 45 km SE of Reykjavik. The band has released 10 albums,, with five albums achieving gold or platinum in Iceland.

The band's original lead vocalist was Björgvin Hreiðarsson. Björgvin appears on Á Móti Sól's first two albums, Gumpurinn and 1999 that include the hit´s “Flottur”, “Á þig” and “Sæt”. In in mid-1999 Björgvin left the band that subsequently recruited Magni Ásgeirsson from the band SHAPE to replace him. Magni was just 20 years old at the time and was also working as a baker in Egilsstaðir in east Iceland. His first recording with the band was the Christmas song "Þegar jólin koma" first released in 1999 and also appearing in 2000 on the album ÁMS.

That album had nine singles that all did well on the radio including “Spenntur” that went to number one and stayed there launching the band.

In 2001 Fiðrildi came out including the singles “Allt”, “Keyrðu mig heim” and “Drottningar”

The albums 12 íslensk topplög in 2004 and Hin 12 topplögin, in early 2005 featured known songs written by a variety of Icelandic songwriters that the boys loved and covered with help from some of their friends.

The band released a greatest hits collection, Á Móti Sól Í 10 Ár, in 2006; the album is a look back at their greatest hits of the previous ten years, including three new tracks. One of them “Hvar sem ér fer” was the most played song on the radio in 2006 and remains one of the biggest songs of the band.

In November 2009, the band released their first studio album of original songs in six years, 8. Recorded over three years in Denmark and Iceland, the album includes the six singles the band released in 2008 and 2009. One of those singles, "Árin," reached number one on the Iceland radio chart. Keyboardist Heimir Eyvindarson is the band's primary songwriter but other members, particularly Magni and lead guitarist Sævar Þór Helgason, have also contributed to the songwriting, alone and in collaboration.

after many years of releasing singles the band made Haust, their first album released on vinyl, and in 2026, to celebrate 30 years of playing, the band released Á móti sól í 30 ár, a Greatest hits album released on vinyl.

== Magni Ásgeirsson ==
Magni has also become known as a solo artist in the U.S., Canada and elsewhere outside of Iceland, as a result of competing on U.S. television show, Rock Star: Supernova, in the summer of 2006. Magni made the finals of the show, finishing in fourth place. .

== Discography ==
=== Albums ===
Album name	Release year	Notable tracks
Gumpurinn	1997	(Djöfull er ég) flottur, Reykjavíkurborg
1999	1999	Sæt, Viagra, Ég er til
ÁMS	2001	Eitthvað er í loftinu, Afmæli, Spenntur, Ég er til
Fiðrildi	2003	Keyrðu mig heim, Drottningar, Allt
12 íslensk topplög	2004	Traustur vinur, Rangur maður
Hin 12 topplögin	2005	Þú og ég, Afgan
Á móti sól í 10 ár	2006	Hvar sem ég fer , Hver einasti dagur
8	2009	Árin, Sé þig seinna, Ef þú ert ein, Dagarnir
Haust	2024	Mínútur, Ég verð að komast aftur heim, Stjörnublik
Í 30 ár	2026	Fyrstu laufin, Okkar lag

=== Singles ===
- Flottur (1998)
- Á þig (1998)
- Sæt (1999)
- Þegar jólin komal (1999)
- Vertu hjá mér (2000)
- Spenntur (2000)
- Afmæli (2000)
- Eitthvað er í loftinu (2000)
- Drottningar (2001)
- Allt (2001)
- Keyrðu mig heim (2001)
- Traustur vinur (2004)
- Langt fram á nótt (2005)
- Hvar sem ég fer (2006)
- Ein (2008)
- Sé þig seinna (2008)
- Ég verð að komast aftur heim (2016)
- Fyrstu laufin (2025)
- Okkar lag (2026)
