= Jófríður Ákadóttir =

Icelandic musician (born 1994)

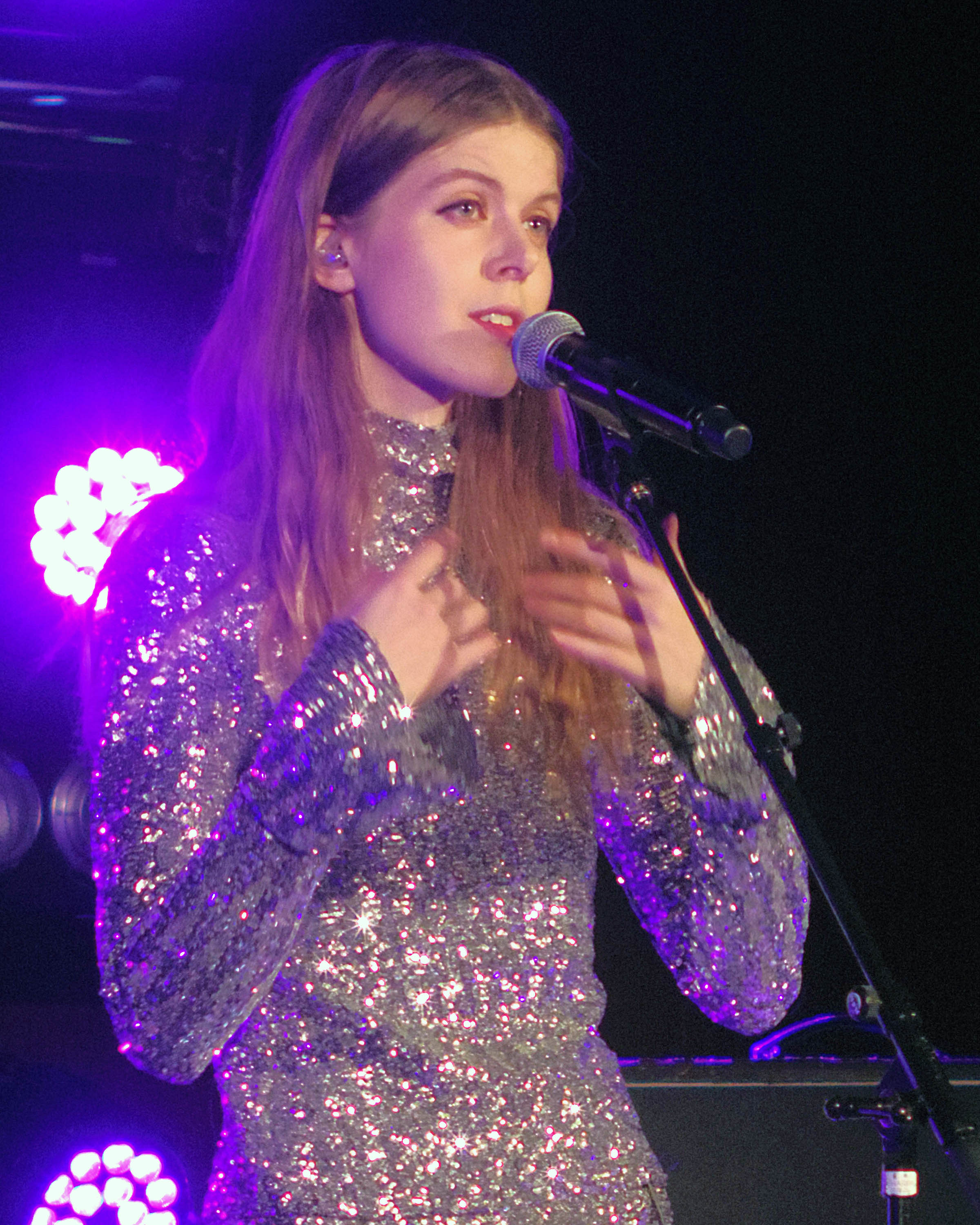
- At Iceland Airwaves, 2018

Background information
- Also known as: JFDR
- Born: 4 August 1994 (age 32); Reykjavík, Iceland
- Genres: Electronic; folk
- Years active: 2009–present
- Labels: White Sun Recordings; 12 Tónar; One Little Indian; Morr Music
- Spouse(s): Joshua Wilkinson, 2020-present

Jófríður Ákadóttir (born 4 August 1994) is an Icelandic singer, songwriter, composer and multi-instrumentalist known as JFDR and is a founding member of the musical groups Samaris and Pascal Pinon. She has performed and recorded with numerous other musicians and has composed music for film and television. Her father is Icelandic composer and musician Áki Ásgeirsson. Her sisters Ásthildur, Marta, and Ólína are also musicians.

== Career ==
=== Pascal Pinon ===
In 2009, when they were 14 years old Jófríður and her twin sister Ásthildur, along with Halla Kristjánsdóttir and Kristín Ylfa Hólmgrímsdóttir, formed the group. They released their self-produced first album, Pascal Pinon, in 2009 which was then re-released by the Morr Music label in 2010. It was described by Allmusic as “a truly lovely record.” In 2013 the group, now a duo of Jófríður and Ásthildur, released their second album Twosomeness. A third album, Sundur, was released in 2016.

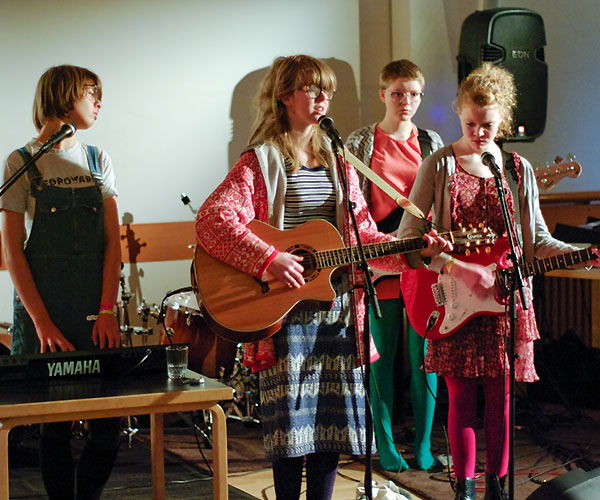
Pascal Pinon in 2009 in the Nordic House, Reykjavík

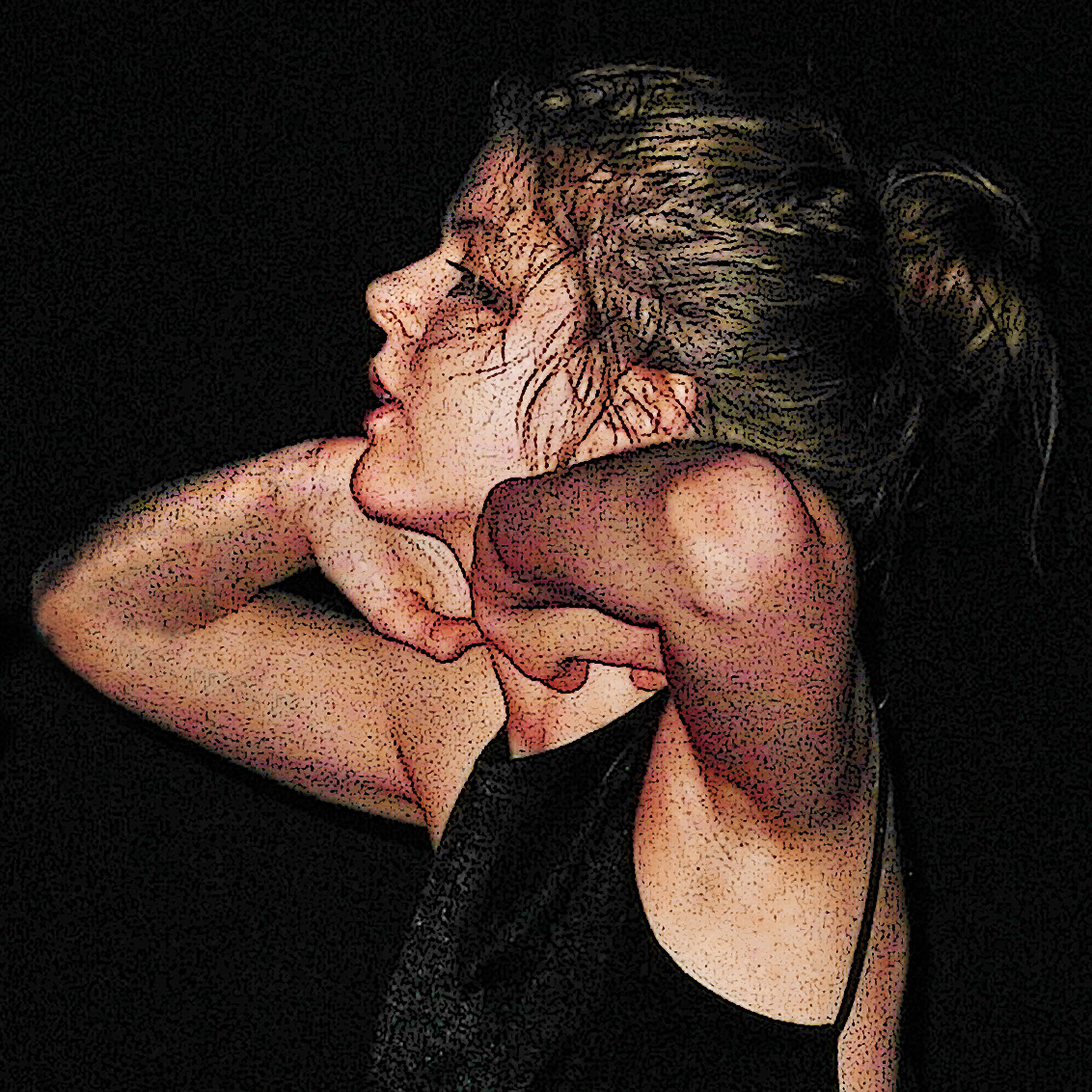
Jófríður Ákadóttir with Samaris, October 2012

=== Samaris ===
Jófríður, Áslaug Rún Magnúsdóttir and Þórður Kári Steinþórsson formed Samaris in 2011. The group won the 2011 Icelandic Músíktilraunir competition and followed this success by self-releasing the EP Hljóma Þú EP, which then won a 2011 Icelandic Kraumur award. A further self-released EP, Stofnar falla, followed in 2012. The group signed with One Little Independent Records and their self-titled debut album was released in July 2013 to generally favourable reviews. The album combined their compositions with lyrics taken from 19th-century Icelandic poems. Samaris released Silkidrangar in 2014, Silkidrangar Sessions in 2015, and Black Lights in 2016.

=== Gangly ===
In 2014, Jófríður was involved with the conceptual project Gangly with Sindri Már Sigfússon (Sin Fang) and Úlfur Alexander Einarsson (of the Icelandic band Oyama) initially releasing the track Fuck With Someone Else. Gangly went on to sign to UK label AMF Records and made a series of video singles.

=== JFDR ===
In 2017 her solo album Brazil (produced in collaboration with Shahzad Ismaily) was released. In 2018 she was named "Artist of the Year" by The Reykjavík Grapevine tabloid magazine. JFDR - White Sun Live. Part I : Strings, an EP of her songs reworked with a string section, was released in 2018. Gravity, a special EP, was released during the 2018 Iceland Airwaves in the form of a bar of chocolate with a download code. In 2020, Jófríður, along with her four sisters, gave a video concert in Reykjavík to an empty hall (due to the Covid-19 pandemic) for the album release of New Dreams. The pandemic also caused the cancellation of her spring and fall 2020 tours. New Dreams won the (Reykjavík) Grapevine Music Awards 2021 album of the year. She won the 2024 Icelandic music award in the category Pop, Rock, Hip Hop, and Electronic for her album Museum.

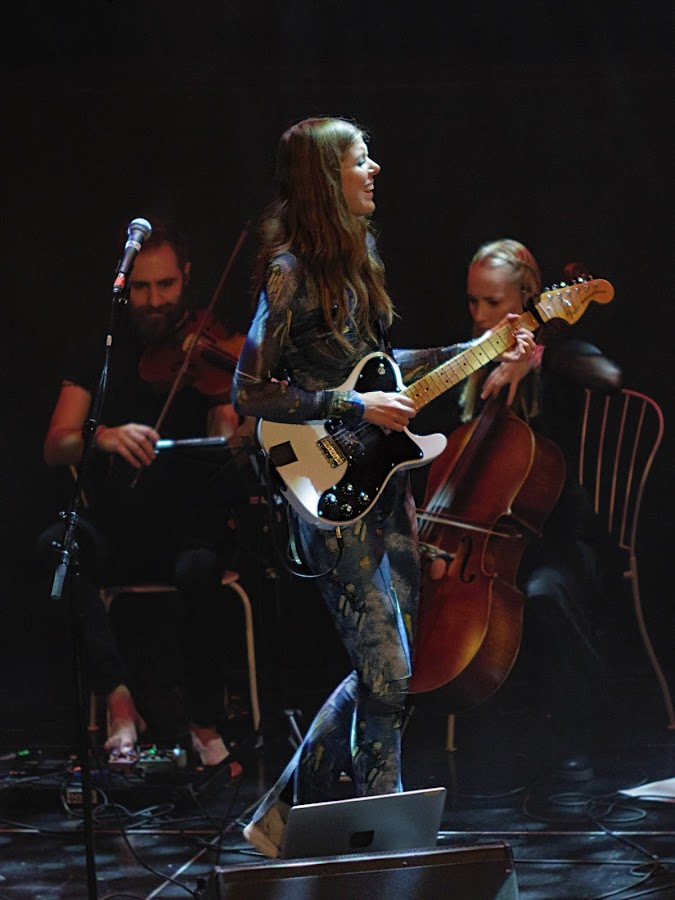
JFDR at Gamla Bíó, Iceland Airwaves 2022

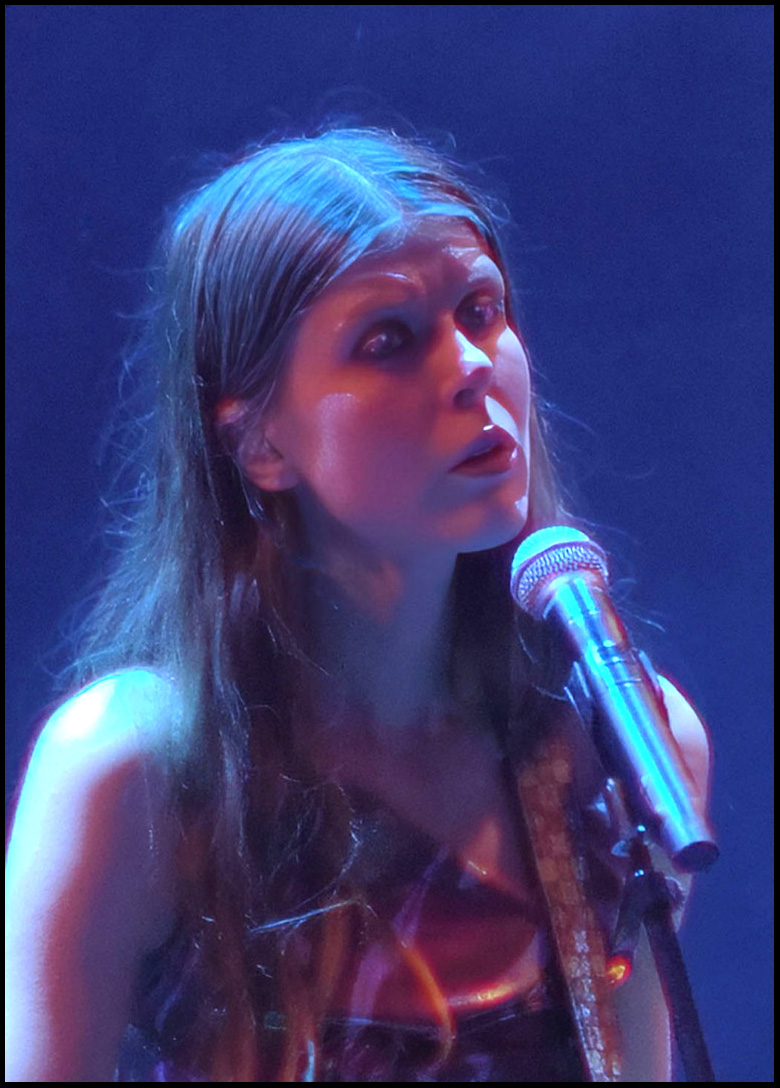
JFDR singing at Gamla Bíó, Reykjavík, Iceland, 2023

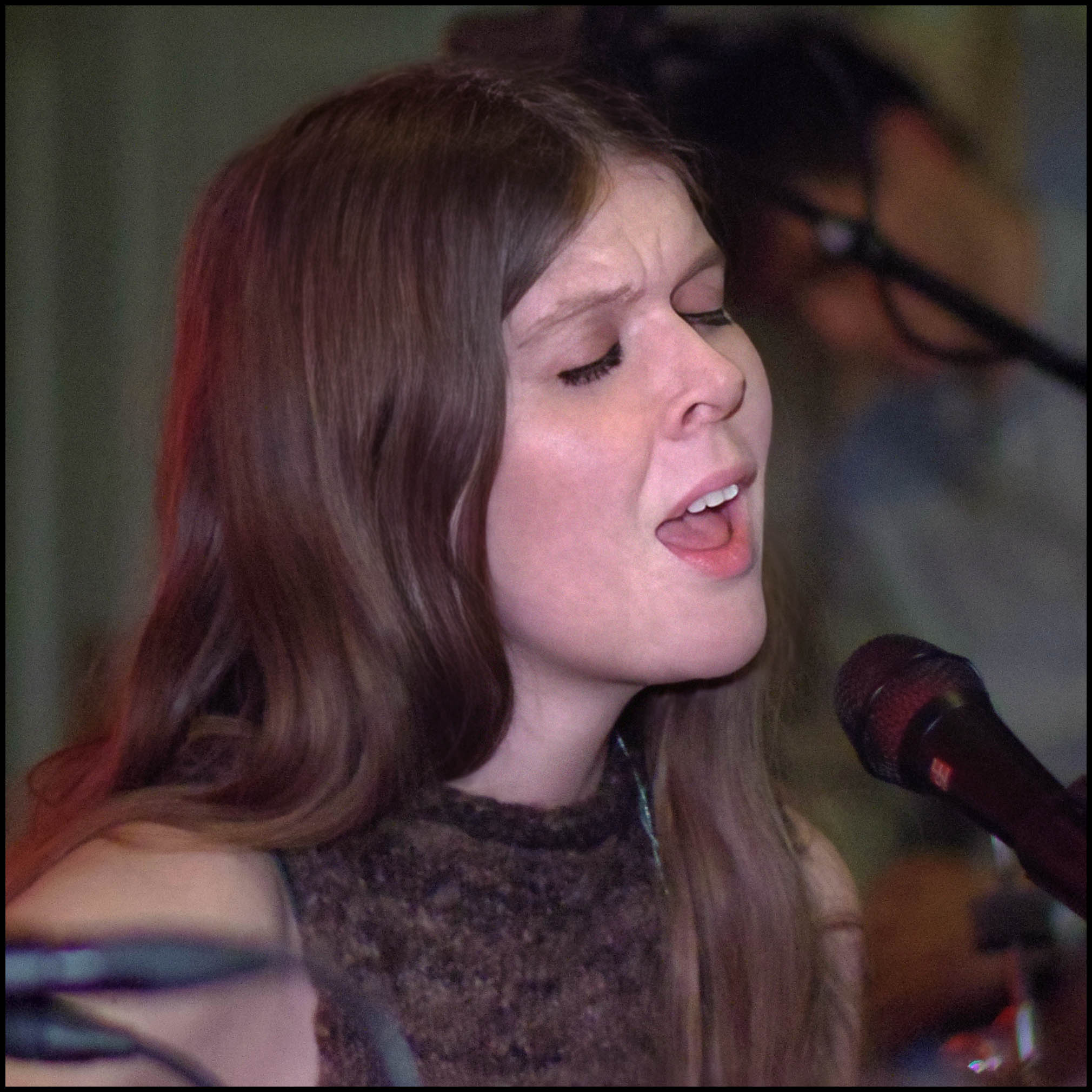
Jófríður Ákadóttir performing in Fríkirkjan, Reykjavík, 2025

=== Collaborations ===
Jófríður has collaborated with Low Roar, Lapalux, Daníel Bjarnason, Damien Rice, Aaron Roche, Nini Julia Bang, Sin Fang, Birnir, Max Sokolinski, Kreld, Aves, Örvar Smárason, Strange Boy, and Penelope Trappes. In December 2020 she performed with Ólafur Arnalds in A Sunrise Session video.In 2026 Jófríður was featured in a PBS Great Performances episode.

=== Soundtrack compositions ===
Jófríður has composed music for film and television including Dakota Fanning's short Hello Apartment, Silja Hauksdóttir's feature film Agnes Joy, and Marteinn Thorsson’s feature film Backyard Village. She has also composed the music for the television series Systrabönd (Sisterhood). She performed music for the video game Death Stranding (2019). In 2022 she wrote the music for the TV series Randalín og Mundi: Dagar í desember (24 episodes). In 2023 she contributed music to the Icelandic TV series Stormur and in 2024 to the Icelandic true-crime documentary series Íslensk Sakamál. In 2025 Jófriður and Áslaug Magnúsdóttir presented the film A story from St. John’s Eve.

== Influences ==
Jófríður has stated that she has been influenced by Joni Mitchell, Arthur Russell, Steve Reich, Enya, Björk, and Yoko Ono.

== Discography ==
=== JFDR ===
Studio albums

- Brazil (2017), (White Sun Recordings/Kobalt)
- New Dreams (2020) (Krúnk)
- Museum (2023) (Houndstooth)

Extended plays

- JFDR - White Sun Live. Part I : Strings (2018) (Morr Music)
- Gravity (2018) (Omnom)
- Dream On (2020) (Krúnk)

=== Samaris ===
Studio albums

- Samaris (2013) (One Little Indian Records)
- Silkidrangar (2014) (One Little Indian Records)
- Silkidrangar Sessions (2015) (One Little Indian Records)
- Black Lights (2016) (One Little Indian Records)

Extended plays

- Hljóma Þú (2011) (self-released)
- Stofnar falla (2012) (self-released)

=== Pascal Pinon ===
Albums

- Pascal Pinon (2009) (self-released)
- Pascal Pinon (2010) (Morr Music)
- Twosomeness (2013) (Morr Music)
- Sundur (2016) (Morr Music)

Extended plays

- Pascal Pinon EP (2009) (self-released)
- I wrote a song EP (2010) (A Number of Small Things)
- Party Wolves EP (2012) (Morr Music)
