= Susanne un jour =

16th-century French poem by Guillaume Guéroult

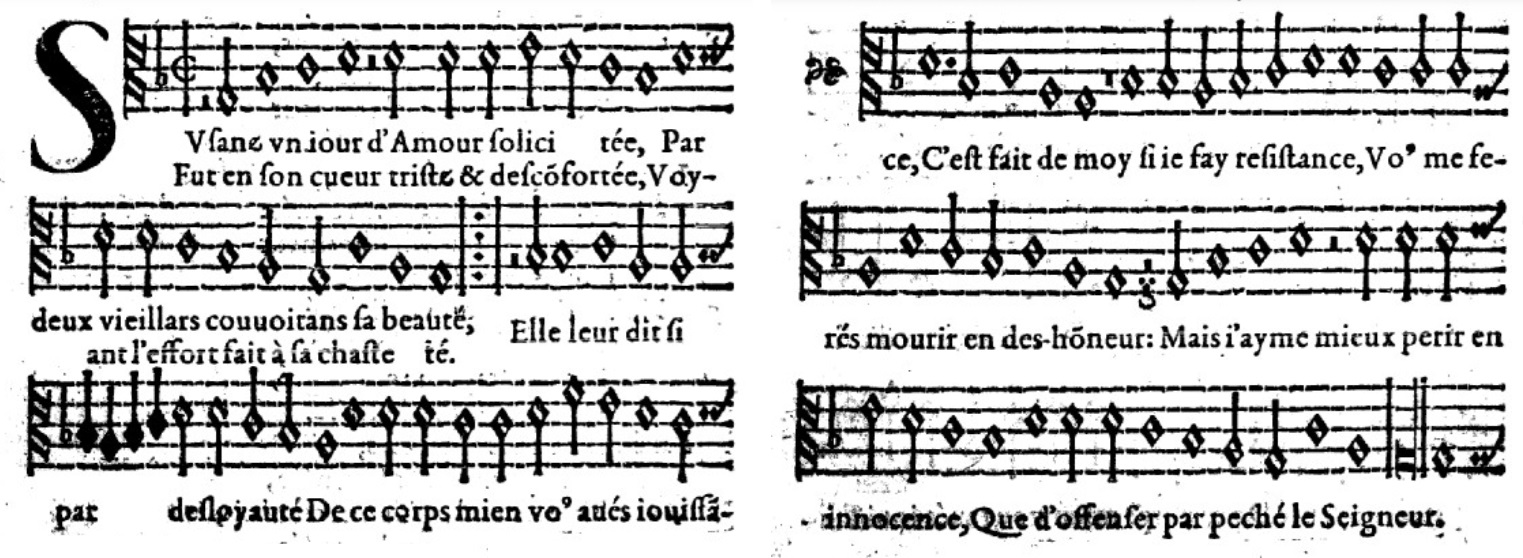
Tenor (melody) of the composition by Didier Lupi Second with the words by Guéroult

Susanne un jour is a 16th-century French poem by Guillaume Guéroult (1507–1569) based on the biblical story of Susannah and the Elders. It was set to music by Didier Lupi Second and much adapted by later composers, including Orlande de Lassus, Cipriano de Rore, Gerard van Turnhout, Claude Le Jeune, and Eustache Du Caurroy.

The text was also translated into various languages and sung widely throughout Europe well into the seventeenth century. For example, a version to an Icelandic text (Súsanna, sannan Guðs dóm) is found in the Icelandic manuscript Melódía (Rask 98), written in ca. 1660.

Lassus's Missa Susanne un jour is a mass setting on the theme of the song tune.

== Text ==
Suzanne un jour d'amour sollicitée
Par deux vieillards convoitant sa beauté
Fut en son cœur triste et déconfortée
Voyant l'effort fait à sa chasteté.
Elle leur dit : si par déloyauté
De ce corps mien vous avez jouissance,
C'est fait de moi ! Si je fais résistance,
Vous me ferez mourir en déshonneur:
Mais j'aime mieux périr en innocence
Que d'offenser par péché le Seigneur.

English translation:

One day, Susanne's love was solicited
By two old men coveting her beauty.
She became sad and discomforted at heart,
Seeing the attempt on her chastity.
She said to them: 'If disloyally
From my body you take pleasure,
It is over with me! If I resist,
You would make me die in disgrace:
But I would rather perish in innocence,
Than offend the Lord by sin.'

== Selected recordings ==
Orlande de Lassus. Missa Susanne un jour. Oxford Camerata, dir. Jeremy Summerly. Naxos, 1993.

François Ier, musiques d'un règne. Doulce Mémoire, dir. Denis Raisin-Dadre. Outhere-Music/Doulce Mémoire, 2014.

Carmina Chamber Choir (Súsanna, sannan Guðs dóm), dir. Árni Heimir Ingólfsson. Crymogea, 2019.
