= Agent Fresco =

Icelandic progressive rock band

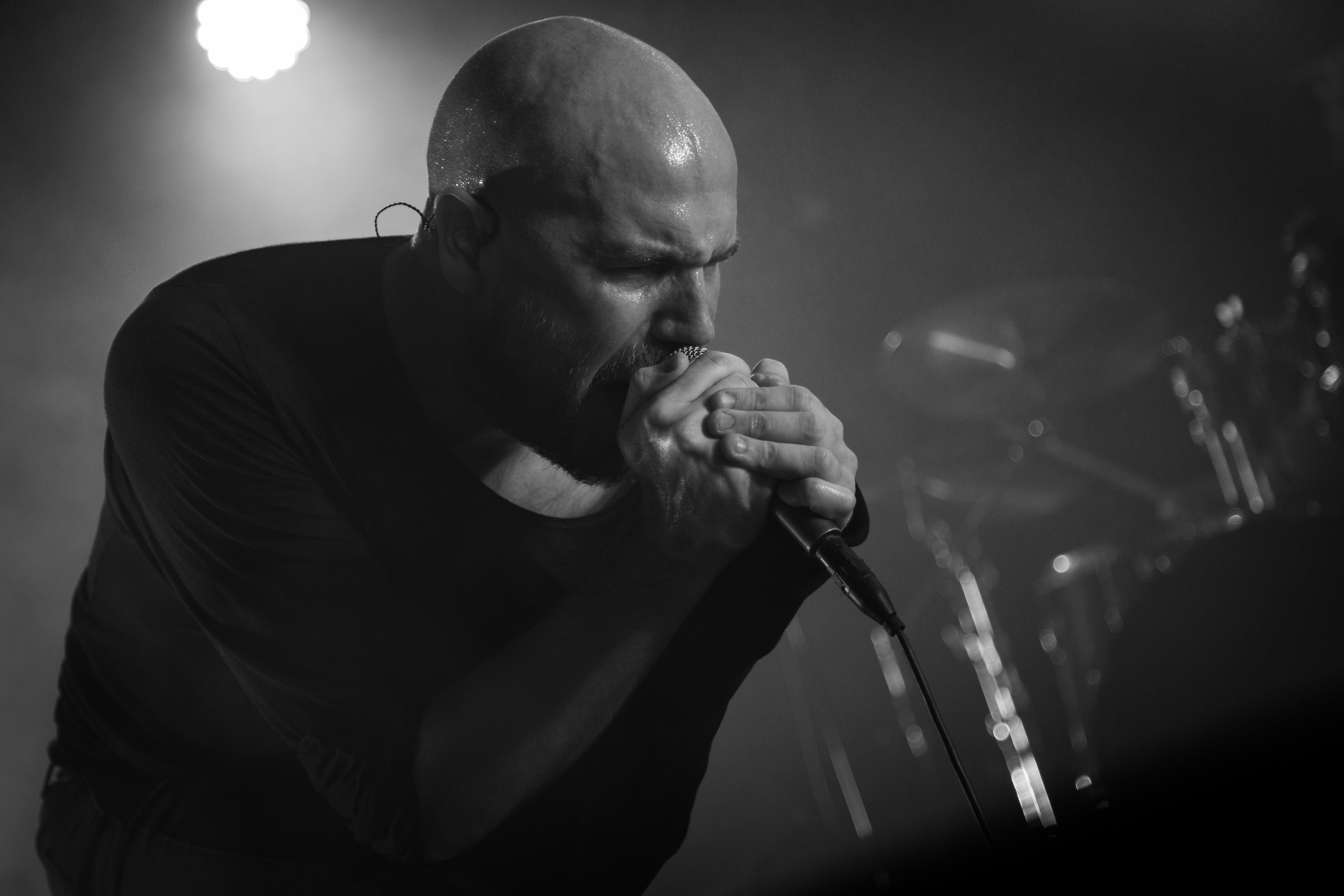
- Agent Fresco performing in 2016

Background information
- Origin: Reykjavík, Iceland
- Genres: Alternative rock; progressive rock; math rock; art rock
- Years active: 2008–present
- Labels: Record; Long Branch
- Members: Arnór Dan Arnarson; Hrafnkell Örn Guðjónsson; Vignir Rafn Hilmarsson; Þórarinn Guðnason
- Website: agentfresco.is

Agent Fresco are an Icelandic band that combines pop, alternative, art, and math rock. They formed in 2008, just weeks prior to winning the Músíktilraunir. Their first release was the EP Lightbulb Universe, which won at the Kraumur Awards.

The lead singer is Arnór Dan Arnarson. Vignir Rafn Hilmarsson plays bass guitar as well as the electric upright bass, Hrafnkell Örn Guðjónsson plays the drums, and Þórarinn Guðnason plays the guitar and piano/keyboards.

In late 2010, Agent Fresco released their first full-length album, A Long Time Listening. Destrier, their second full-length album, followed on 7 August 2015.

== Awards ==
Agent Fresco won a Kraumur Award for their debut EP Lightbulb Universe.

In 2009 they were named best new artist at the Icelandic Music Awards.

They won Rock Album of the Year in 2016 for Destrier, with Arnór Dan also winning Male Singer of the Year.

== Band members ==
- Arnór Dan Arnarson – vocals, keyboards
- Þórarinn Guðnason – guitar, piano, programming
- Vignir Rafn Hilmarsson – bass, upright bass
- Hrafnkell Örn Guðjónsson – drums, percussion

== Discography ==
Albums

- A Long Time Listening (2010)
- Destrier (2015)

EPs

- Lightbulb Universe (2008)

Singles

- "Eyes of a Cloud Catcher" (2008)
- "Translations" (2010)
- "A Long Time Listening" (2011)
- "Dark Water" (2014)
- "See Hell" (2015)
- "Wait For Me" (2015)
- "Howls" (2015)
