= Músíktilraunir =

Annual Icelandic music competition

Músíktilraunir (English: Music Experiments) is an annual music competition held in Reykjavík, Iceland.

== Winners ==
- 1982 – Dron
- 1983 – Dúkkulísurnar
- 1984 – not held due to teachers' strike
- 1985 – Gipsy
- 1986 – Greifarnir
- 1987 – Stuðkompaníið
- 1988 – Jójó
- 1989 – Laglausir
- 1990 – Nabblastrengir (A.K.A.: Umbilical cords)
- 1991 – Infusoria (A.K.A.: Sororicide)
- 1992 – Kolrassa Krókríðandi (later became Bellatrix)
- 1993 – Yukatan
- 1994 – Maus
- 1995 – Botnleðja (A.K.A.: Silt)
- 1996 – Stjörnukisi
- 1997 – Soðin Fiðla
- 1998 – Stæner
- 1999 – Mínus
- 2000 – 110 Rottweiler hundar (later became XXX Rottweiler hundar)
- 2001 – Andlát
- 2002 – Búdrýgindi
- 2003 – Dáðadrengir
- 2004 – Mammút
- 2005 – Jakobínarína
- 2006 – The Foreign Monkeys
- 2007 – Shogun
- 2008 – Agent Fresco
- 2009 – Bróðir Svartúlfs
- 2010 – Of Monsters and Men
- 2011 – Samaris
- 2012 – RetRoBot
- 2013 – Vök
- 2014 – Vio
- 2015 – Rythmatik
- 2016 – Hórmónar
- 2017 – Between Mountains
- 2018 – Ateria
- 2019 – Blóðmör
- 2020 – no contest held due to COVID-19
- 2021 – Ólafur Kram
- 2022 - KUSK
- 2023 - Fókus
- 2024 - Vampíra
- 2025 - Geðbrigði
- 2026 - Falinn gjóður
