= Sigur Rós discography =

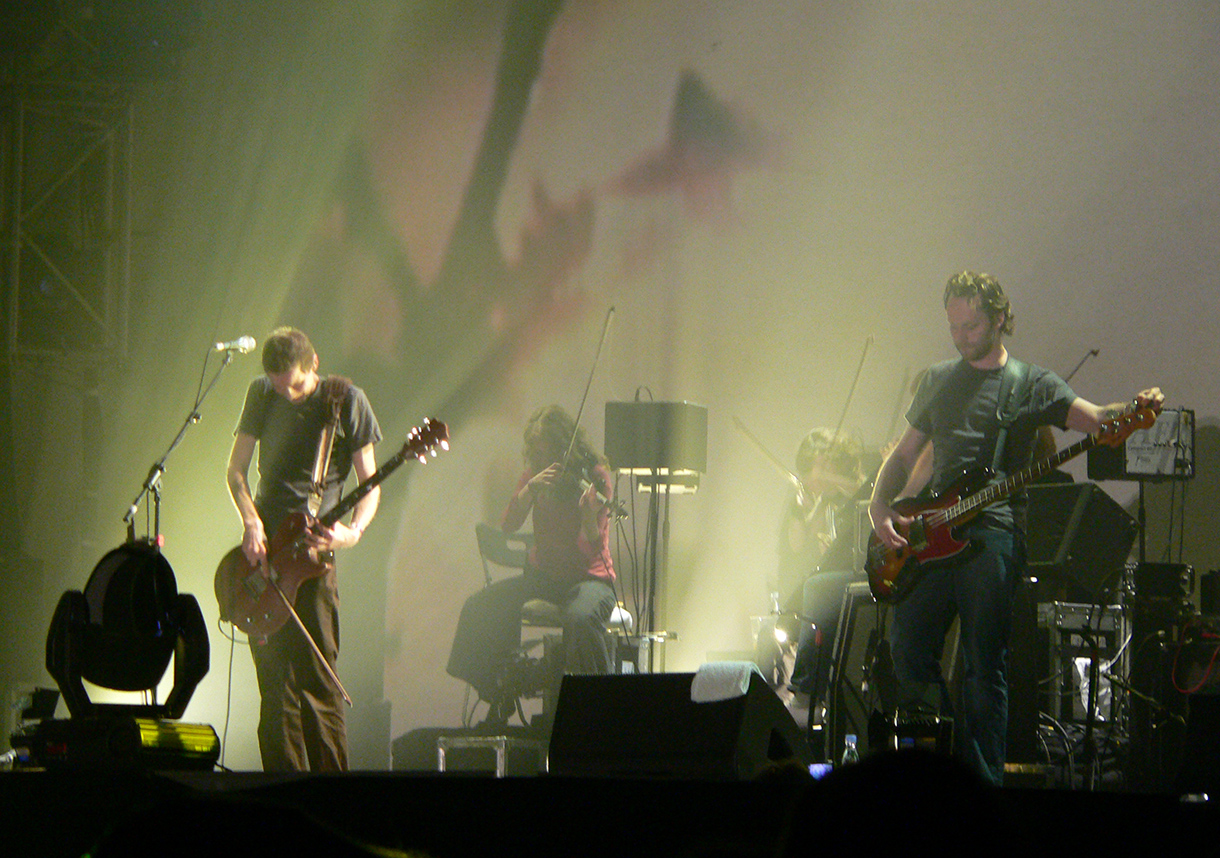
- Sigur Rós performing at the Roskilde Festival 2006, Denmark
- Studio albums: 8
- Extended plays: 5
- Soundtrack albums: 1
- Live albums: 1
- Compilation albums: 3
- Singles: 17
- Video albums: 2
- Music videos: 23
- Remix albums: 3
- Other appearances: 13

The discography of Sigur Rós, an Icelandic post-rock group, consists of eight studio albums, three remix albums, five extended plays, one soundtrack album, sixteen singles, twenty-three music videos and two video albums. Sigur Rós was formed in 1994 in Reykjavík, Iceland, by singer and guitarist Jón Þór Birgisson, bassist Georg Hólm and drummer Ágúst Ævar Gunnarsson.

Sigur Rós released their debut album, Von, in 1997 with Smekkleysa Records. It failed to chart, selling 313 copies in its first year of release, but was certified platinum in 2005 by Iceland's record industry association. Von brigði was released in 1998 and features remixes of tracks from Von. Only one track, "Leit af lífi", was new to the album. Keyboardist Kjartan Sveinsson joined the band in 1998 and a year later Ágætis byrjun was released. It reached number 1 on the Icelandic album chart, number 17 in Norway, and number 52 on the United Kingdom Albums Chart. Two tracks were released from the album as singles: "Svefn-g-englar" and "Ný batterí". Gunnarsson left the band after Ágætis byrjun and was replaced by Orri Páll Dýrason.

The group's third studio album, ( ), was released in June 2002, comprising eight untitled tracks divided by a 36-second silence. The album's title consists of two opposing parentheses; it has no other official title, though members of Sigur Rós have referred to it as "Svigaplatan" ("The Bracket Album"). The entire album is performed in Vonlenska, a constructed language. One single was released from ( ), "untitled #1" (a.k.a. "Vaka"). Takk..., released in 2005, produced three singles, "Glósóli", "Hoppípolla" and "Sæglópur". The album reached number 1 in Iceland, number 4 in Italy and Norway, number 16 in the UK, and number 27 in the United States. It was certified gold in Iceland and the UK. Sigur Rós's fifth studio album, Með suð í eyrum við spilum endalaust, was released in 2008 with "Gobbledigook", "Inní mér syngur vitleysingur" and "Við spilum endalaust" all released as singles. Með suð... was also certified gold in the UK.

In March 2012, Sigur Rós released "Ekki múkk", from their sixth studio album Valtari, also released in 2012. In 2013, they released their seventh album, Kveikur.

== Albums ==
=== Studio albums ===
Year	Album details	Peak chart positions												Certifications	Sales
Year	Album details	ICL	AUS	DEN	FIN	FRA	GER	IRL	ITA	NOR	SWE	UK	US	Certifications	Sales
1997	Von: Released: June 1997; Label: Smekkleysa; Formats: CD, LP	—	—	—	—	—	—	—	—	—	—	—	—	ICL: Platinum	ICL: 10,500
1999	Ágætis byrjun: Released: June 1999; Label: Smekkleysa; Formats: CD, LP	1	—	—	—	65	59	38	—	17	—	52	—	ICL: Platinum; UK: Gold	ICL: 19,500; US: 227,000
2002	( ): Released: 28 October 2002; Label: Smekkleysa; Formats: CD, LP	1	49	24	24	19	33	17	—	6	50	49	51	ICL: Gold; UK: Gold	ICL: 8,000; US: 332,000
2005	Takk...: Released: 12 September 2005; Label: Smekkleysa; Formats: CD, LP, digital download	1	19	16	8	30	27	6	4	4	12	16	27	DEN: Platinum; ICL: Gold; UK: Platinum	ICL: 10,000; US: 202,000
2008	Með suð í eyrum við spilum endalaust: Released: 20 June 2008; Label: Smekkleysa; Formats: CD, LP, digital download	1	14	8	7	30	26	4	7	7	29	5	15	UK: Gold	
2012	Valtari: Released: 28 May 2012; Label: Parlophone; Formats: CD, LP, Digital download	1	14	21	21	29	23	1	7	12	31	8	7		ICL: 4,300; UK: 11,000; US: 74,000
2013	Kveikur: Released: 17 June 2013; Label: XL; Formats: CD, LP, digital download	1	17	8	18	18	19	6	13	6	14	9	14		
2023	Átta: Released: 16 June 2023; Label: Von Dur, BMG; Formats: CD, LP, digital download	—	— (Note: Átta did not enter the top 50 of the ARIA Albums Chart, but peaked at number eight on the ARIA Vinyl Albums Chart.)	—	—	51	5	—	18	—	—	30	—		
"—" denotes a title that was not released or did not chart in that territory.

=== Compilation albums ===
Year	Album details	Peak chart positions										Certifications	Notes
Year	Album details	ICL	AUS	FRA	GER	IRL	ITA	NOR	SWE	SWI	UK	Certifications	Notes
2007	Hvarf/Heim: Released: 5 November 2007; Label: EMI; Formats: CD, LP, digital download	2	49	50	35	15	16	21	45	44	23	UK: Silver	Hvarf (CD 1) contains studio versions of previously unreleased songs.; Heim (CD 2) contains live acoustic versions of songs as performed in the film Heima.
2008	In a Frozen Sea: A Year with Sigur Ros: Released: 8 February 2008; Label: Artist in Residence; Format: Vinyl	—	—	—	—	—	—	—	—	—	—		Box set containing Agaetis Byrjun, (), and Takk.; Includes the song "Untitled #9" (a.k.a. "Smáskifa"), first released in Sigur 1 / Sigur 9.
2009	We Play Endlessly: Released: 31 January 2009; Label: EMI/The Independent; Format: CD	—	—	—	—	—	—	—	—	—	—		Collection of songs released under EMI's label Parlophone.
"—" denotes a title that was not released or did not chart in that territory.

=== Live albums ===
Year	Album details	Peak chart positions								
Year	Album details	AUT	BEL	FRA	GER	IRL	NOR	SWE	UK	US
2011	Inni: Released: 7 November 2011; Formats: CD, DVD, LP	32	24	76	33	49	32	49	45	73

=== Remix albums ===
Year	Album details	Notes
1998	Von brigði: Released: July 1998; Label: Smekkleysa; Formats: CD, LP	
2017	Route One: Released: December 2017; Label: Krúnk; Formats: LP	Limited release; Re-released in 2018 on Record Store Day
2017	Liminal: Released: December 2017; Label: Krúnk; Formats: LP	Limited release; Re-released in 2018 on Record Store Day; Remixed by Jónsi, Alex Somers and Paul Corley
2018	Liminal 2: Released: October 2018; Label: Formats:	
2025	Takk… (The Tape Variations): Released: 13 November 2025; Label: Formats:	Remixed by Sidney Satorsky

=== Soundtrack albums ===
Year	Album details
2003	Hlemmur: Released: March 2003; Label: Smekkleysa; Format: CD
2020	Odin's Raven Magic: Released: December 2020; Label: Krúnk; Format: CD, download

=== Video albums ===
Year	Album details	Certifications
2007	Heima: Director: Dean DeBlois; Released: 27 September 2007; Studio: Klikk Productions	CAN: Gold; UK: Gold
2013	Valtari Film Experiment: Director: Various; Released: 25 February 2013; Studio: EMI	

== Extended plays ==
Year	EP details	Peak chart positions		
Year	EP details	FRA	IRL	ITA
2001	Rímur: Released: April 2001; Label: Krúnk; Format: CD	—	—	—
2003	Sigur 1 / Sigur 9: Released: 13 May 2003; Label: MCA; Format: CD	—	—	—
2004	Ba Ba Ti Ki Di Do: Released: 24 March 2004; Label: Geffen; Formats: Mini CD, CD, LP	77	25	7
2006	Sæglópur Japan Tour EP: Released: 10 July 2006; Label: EMI; Formats: 12", CD	—	—	—
2013	Brennisteinn US Tour EP: Released: 23 March 2013; Label: Formats:	—	—	—

== Singles ==
Year	Song	Peak chart positions							Album
Year	Song	ICL	BEL (FL) Tip	CAN	DEN	GER	IRL	UK	Album
1999	"Svefn-g-englar"	—	—	—	—	—	—	146	Ágætis byrjun
2000	"Ný batterí"	—	—	—	—	—	—	133	Ágætis byrjun
2003	"Vaka"	—	—	4	20	98	31	72	( )
2005	"Glósóli"	1	—	—	—	—	—	—	Takk...
2005	"Hoppípolla"	—	—	—	—	—	—	24	Takk...
2006	"Sæglópur"	—	—	—	—	—	—	—	Takk...
2007	"Hljómalind"	—	—	—	—	—	—	91	Hvarf/Heim
2008	"Gobbledigook"	9	19	—	—	—	—	—	Með suð í eyrum við spilum endalaust
2008	"Inní mér syngur vitleysingur"	8	16	—	—	—	—	152	Með suð í eyrum við spilum endalaust
2009	"Við spilum endalaust"	—	4	—	—	—	—	—	Með suð í eyrum við spilum endalaust
2012	"Ekki múkk"	—	—	—	—	—	—	—	Valtari
2012	"Varúð"	—	82	—	—	—	—	—	Valtari
2013	"Brennisteinn"	14	—	—	—	—	—	—	Kveikur
2013	"Ísjaki"	12	36	—	—	—	—	—	Kveikur
2016	"Óveður"	—	—	—	—	—	—	—	Non-album singles
2017	"Á"	—	—	—	—	—	—	—	Non-album singles
2023	"Blóðberg"	—	—	—	—	—	—	—	Átta
"—" denotes a title that was not released or did not chart in that territory.

== Other appearances ==
These songs have not appeared on official Sigur Rós releases.

=== Guest appearances ===
Year	Song	Album
1998	"Dót" (with Didda)	Strokið og slegið

=== Compilation appearances ===
Year	Song	Album	Notes
1994	"Fljúgðu"	Smekkleysa í hálfa öld	Compilation album featuring artists signed to Smekkleysa Records; Credited to Victory Rose (English translation of "Sigur Rós")
1998	"Leit Að Lífi"	Popp í Reykjavík	track from "Von Brigði"
2000	"Svefn-G-Englar"	Kidology	Mojo presents a Radiohead companion
2003	"Ég Mun Læknast"	Branches and Routes	Compilation album featuring artists signed to Fat Cat Records

=== Soundtrack appearances ===
Year	Song	Soundtrack	Notes
2000	"Bíum bíum bambaló"	Angels of the Universe	Soundtrack to the film Angels of the Universe, composed by Hilmar Örn Hilmarsson and Sigur Rós
2000	"Dánarfregnir og jarðafarir"	Angels of the Universe	Soundtrack to the film Angels of the Universe, composed by Hilmar Örn Hilmarsson and Sigur Rós
2001	"Svefn-g-englar"	Vanilla Sky	Part of the original soundtrack curated by the director Cameron Crowe
2001	"Agaetis Byrjun"	Vanilla Sky	Part of the original soundtrack curated by the director Cameron Crowe
2001	"The Nothing Song (Njosnavelin)"	Vanilla Sky	Part of the original soundtrack curated by the director Cameron Crowe
2004	Film score	The Loch Ness Kelpie	Score for a 12-minute short film produced for BBC Alba
2005	"Á ferð til Breiðafjarðar"	Gargandi snilld	Performed with Steindór Andersen
2005	"Hrafnagaldr Óðins"	Gargandi snilld	Performed with Steindór Andersen
2009	"Fljotavik" & "Ara Batur"	The Boys Are Back	The film features a score composed by Hal Lindes and a soundtrack by Sigur Rós.
2010	"Festival"	127 Hours	
2011	"Hoppípolla"	We Bought a Zoo	Original soundtrack composed by Jónsi
2014	"The Rains of Castamere"	Game of Thrones: Season 4	Original soundtrack composed by Ramin Djawadi
2016	"Varðeldur"	Captain Fantastic	Original soundtrack scored by Alex Somers, a frequent collaborator of Sigur Rós and Jónsi
2017	"Match" & "End"	"Hang the DJ"	Original soundtrack scored by Alex Somers, a frequent collaborator of Sigur Rós and Jónsi

== Music videos ==
Year	Song	Director(s)
1999	"Svefn-g-englar"	August Jakobsson, Sigur Rós
2000	"Viðrar vel til loftárása"	Stefan Arni, Siggi Kinski, Sigur Rós
2003	"untitled #1"	Floria Sigismondi
2005	"Glósóli"	Stefan Arni, Siggi Kinski
2005	"Hoppípolla"	Stefan Arni, Siggi Kinski
2006	"Sæglópur"	Sigur Rós, The Mill
2007	"Heima"	
2008	"Gobbledigook"	Stefan Arni, Siggi Kinski
2008	"Inní mér syngur vitleysingur"	Sigur Rós
2008	"Við spilum endalaust"	Sigur Rós
2012	"Varúð"	Unknown
2012	"Ég anda"	Unknown
2012	"Fjögur píanó"	Unknown
2012	"Rembihnútur"	Unknown
2012	"Ekki múkk"	Unknown
2012	"Dauðalogn"	Unknown
2012	"Valtari"	Unknown
2013	"Brennisteinn"	Andrew Thomas Huang
2013	"Ísjaki" (Lyric video)	Unknown
2013	"Kveikur" (promo video)	Unknown
2013	"Stormur" (collaborative video)	Unknown
2013	"Rafstraumur"	Unknown
2016	"Óveður"	Jonas Åkerlund
2023
2023	"Blóðberg"	Johan Renck
2023	"Andrá"	Katya Gimro, Alexey Krupnik
2023	"8"	Rúrí
2023	"Gold"	Rene van Pannevis
2023	"Ylur"	Sophie Hunter
2023	"Mór"	Glenn Leyburn, Lisa Barros D'Sa
2023	"Glóð"	Claudia Hausfeld, Rúnar Rúnarsson
2023	"Skel"	George Jasper Stone
2023	"Fall"	Katya Gimro
2023	"Klettur"	Frosti Jón Runólfsson
