= Inni (album) =

Live album by Sigur Rós
- Released: 7 November 2011
- Recorded: 2008
- Genres: Post-rock, ambient

Sigur Rós chronology
We Play Endlessly (2009)	Inni (2011)	Valtari (2012)

Inni (Icelandic pronunciation: [ˈɪnːɪ], Within) is a live motion picture and album by the Icelandic band Sigur Rós, released in 2011. The concert footage was directed by Vincent Morisset and filmed at Alexandra Palace in 2008. It was released on 7 November 2011 in various formats, including vinyl, DVD, Blu-ray, and CD. Theatrical versions were shown around the world in late 2011.

The release features live tracks from all but one of the band's albums, with a strong focus on their then-most recent album, Með suð í eyrum við spilum endalaust. Two tracks, "Ný Batterí" and "Festival", were made available for free download on the band's website, and "E-Bow" was also offered as a free download with every pre-order of the package.

== Editions ==
The commercial package for Inni was released in five different editions:

- 'Digital download' edition: Includes the motion picture on .mp4 and/or album in .wav or .mp3.
- 'Standard' edition: Features the motion picture on DVD and the album on double CD.
- 'Blu-ray' edition: Contains the motion picture on Blu-ray and DVD, and the album on double CD.
- 'Vinyl/DVD' edition: Includes the motion picture on DVD and the album on both double CD and triple vinyl.
- 'Limited special' edition (6996 copies): Released in Iceland, this edition features special packaging, the Blu-ray, DVDs (NTSC and PAL versions), double CD, a 7" coloured vinyl of the song "Lúppulagið" and additional bonus material.

== Critical reception ==
Professional ratings
Aggregate scores
Source	Rating
Metacritic	(78/100)
Review scores
Source	Rating
AllMusic	4/5 stars
The A.V. Club	(B+)
BBC	(positive)
Clash	8/10 stars
Consequence of Sound	4/5 stars
Drowned in Sound	8/10 stars
Entertainment Weekly	(A−)
Paste Magazine	(8.2/10)
Pitchfork	(7.2/10)
Slant Magazine	3/5 stars
Spin	7/10 stars

Inni has received mostly positive reviews from music critics. On Metacritic, which assigns a normalised score out of 100 based on reviews from mainstream critics, the album received an average score of 78, based on 18 reviews, indicating "generally favorable reviews".

Marc Hogan of Spin wrote: "After three-plus years without fresh Sigur Rós material, the real treat is the contemplatively buzzing, ambient finale "Lúppulagid"—an honest-to-goodness new song."

Melissa Maerz from Entertainment Weekly commented that "the DVD captures the 75-minute buildup of guitars, xylophones, piccolos, and frontman Jónsi's cherubic voice, until it reaches its epic finale on the ethereal new swooner Lúppulagid." Kevin Liedel from Slant Magazine awarded the album three out of five stars, writing: "Inni is beautiful and alluring, yes, but ultimately a recycled bit of nostalgia likely to please very few."

== Motion picture track listing ==
1. "Ný batterí"
2. "Svefn-g-englar"
3. "Fljótavík"
4. "Inní mér syngur vitleysingur"
5. "Sæglópur"
6. "Festival"
7. "E-Bow"
8. "Popplagið"
9. "Lúppulagið"

DVD/Blu-ray bonus tracks:

1. "All Alright"
2. "Glósóli"
3. "Hafsól"
4. "Við spilum endalaust"

The DVDs (but not the Blu-Ray) in the 'limited special' edition include an extra bonus track, "Klippa" ("Cut"), a short film directed by Sarah Hopper, featuring ambient music by the band and sound design by Matthew Herbert. This edition also includes a hand-cut piece of the outfits the band wore during the two concerts, placed in a machine-numbered envelope in each copy. The film depicts three actors beginning this process in a highly stylized setting. Additionally, the movie was made available to watch on the band's official YouTube and Vimeo accounts.

== CD track listing ==
CD1
No.	Title	English translation^{[*]}	Length
1.	"Svefn-g-englar" (from Ágætis byrjun, 1999)	Sleepwalking Angels	10:12
2.	"Glósóli" (from Takk..., 2005)	Glowing Sole	6:52
3.	"Ný batterí" (from Ágætis byrjun)	New Batteries	8:38
4.	"Fljótavík" (from Með suð í eyrum við spilum endalaust, 2008)		3:38
5.	"Við spilum endalaust" (from Með suð í eyrum við spilum endalaust)	We Play Endlessly	3:58
6.	"Hoppípolla" (from Takk...)	Hopping in Puddles	4:13
7.	"Með blóðnasir" (from Takk...)	I Have a Nosebleed	2:22
8.	"Inní mér syngur vitleysingur" (from Með suð í eyrum við spilum endalaust)	Within Me, a Lunatic Sings	4:08
9.	"E-Bow" (from ( ), 2002)		9:09

CD2
No.	Title	English translation (unofficial)	Length
1.	"Sæglópur" (from Takk...)	Lost at Sea	7:40
2.	"Festival" (from Með suð í eyrum við spilum endalaust)		7:35
3.	"Hafsól" (from Von, 1997)	Ocean Sun	8:28
4.	"All Alright" (from Með suð í eyrum við spilum endalaust)		5:41
5.	"Popplagið" (from ( ))	The Pop Song	15:23
6.	"Lúppulagið" (previously unreleased, different version released as "Varðeldur" on Valtari)	The Loop Song	5:59

== Vinyl track listing ==
Disc 1, Side A
No.	Title	Length
1.	"Svefn-g-englar"	10:12
2.	"Glósóli"	6:52

Disc 1, Side B
No.	Title	Length
3.	"Ný batterí"	8:38
4.	"Fljótavík"	3:38
5.	"Við spilum endalaust"	3:58

Disc 2, Side C
No.	Title	Length
6.	"Hoppípolla"	4:13
7.	"Með blóðnasir"	2:22
8.	"Inní mér syngur vitleysingur"	4:08
9.	"E-Bow"	9.09

Disc 2, Side D
No.	Title	Length
10.	"Sæglópur"	7:40
11.	"Festival"	7:35

Disc 3, Side E
No.	Title	Length
12.	"Hafsól"	8:28
13.	"All Alright"	5:41

Disc 3, Side F
No.	Title	Length
14.	"Popplagið"	15:23
15.	"Lúppulagið"	5:59

== Personnel ==
- Jón Þór Birgisson – vocals, guitar, piano, pump organ, keyboards, bass
- Kjartan Sveinsson – keyboards, guitar, backup vocals, flute
- Georg Hólm – bass, toy piano
- Orri Páll Dýrason – drums, keyboards, xylophone
- Kjartan Holm – xylophone
