= We Play Endlessly =

2009 compilation album

Compilation album by Sigur Rós
- Released: 31 January 2009
- Genre: Post-rock
- Length: 51:52
- Producer: Sigur Rós

Sigur Rós chronology
Með suð í eyrum við spilum endalaust (2008)	We Play Endlessly (2009)	Inni (2011)

We Play Endlessly is a compilation album by the post-rock group Sigur Rós. It was released on 31 January 2009 in the UK as a free covermount with The Independent national newspaper.

It comprises a selection of songs from previous EPs and albums released after the band signed with EMI's owned label Parlophone:

- "Hoppípolla", "Sæglópur" and "Heysátan" are taken from Takk... (2005)
- "Inní mér syngur vitleysingur", "Gobbledigook" and "Fljótavík" are taken from Með suð í eyrum við spilum endalaust (2008)
- "Í Gær" and "Hafsól" are taken from Hvarf/Heim (2007)
- "Ti Ki" is taken from Ba Ba Ti Ki Di Do (2004)

== Track listing ==
1. "Hoppípolla" – 4:26
2. "Inní mér syngur vitleysingur" – 4:05
3. "Sæglópur" – 7:20
4. "Gobbledigook" – 3:05
5. "Í Gær" – 6:23
6. "Fljótavík" – 3:49
7. "Hafsól" – 9:46
8. "Heysátan" – 4:09
9. "Ti Ki" – 8:49
