= Hvarf/Heim =

2007 compilation/live album by Sigur Rós

- Hvarf cover

Compilation album by Sigur Rós
- Released: 5 November 2007
- Genre: Post-rock; ambient; art rock
- Length: Hvarf: 36:45; Heim: 35:51; Total: 72:36
- Label: EMI; XL Recordings
- Producer: Sigur Rós

Sigur Rós chronology
Takk... (2005)	Hvarf/Heim (2007)	Með suð í eyrum við spilum endalaust (2008)

Alternative cover
- Heim cover

Singles from Hvarf/Heim
- 1. "Hljómalind" Released: 27 August 2007

Professional ratings
Aggregate scores
Source	Rating
Metacritic	74/100
Review scores
Source	Rating
AbsolutePunk.net	86%
AllMusic	3/5 stars
The A.V. Club	B+
Drowned in Sound	4/10
Guardian Unlimited	3/5 stars
NME	7/10 (11/03/2007, p.47)
Pitchfork	7.6/10
Rockfeedback	5/5 stars
Yahoo! Music UK	4/5 stars

Hvarf/Heim is a compilation album by Sigur Rós. Its original CD release comprises two discs: Hvarf contains studio versions of previously unreleased songs (with the exception of "Hafsól", which was released as the B-side of "Hoppípolla" in 2005), while Heim contains live acoustic versions of songs already released. The songs on Heim are the same recordings found in the documentary Heima. In 2008 EMI released a single-disc version in which Heim is simply tracklisted to follow Hvarf. In 2012, the albums were issued on vinyl for the first time to be sold on Record Store Day.

In December 2007, American webzine Somewhere Cold voted Hvarf/Heim EP of the Year on their 2007 Somewhere Cold Awards Hall of Fame.

== Background ==
The cover images are pinhole polaroid photographs. The Hvarf cover is a handheld image of the microphone stands just before the band arrived to play in the gentle rain. The Heim cover is a 7-minute exposure of the stage at Gamla Borg where Sigur Rós performed an acoustic set for friends and family in April 2007.

The album was released on November 5 in Europe and on November 6 in North America. Prior to this release a limited 7" vinyl single of "Hljómalind" was released on 29 October. The album debuted at #23 in UK, #7 on the US independent chart and #83 in Spain selling over 50,000 copies in its first week worldwide. The album, as of June 2008, was certified Silver in the UK for 60,000+ being sold. As of 2011, sales in the United States have exceeded 91,000 copies, according to Nielsen SoundScan.

== Track listing ==
Hvarf ("Disappeared" or "Haven")
No.	Title	Original version appears on	Length
1.	"Salka" (The name of Georg's stepdaughter)	Previously unreleased	6:09
2.	"Hljómalind" (Formerly known as "Rokklagið" ["The Rock Song"])	Previously unreleased	4:56
3.	"Í Gær" (Formerly known as "Lagið Í Gær" ["Yesterday"])	Previously unreleased	6:26
4.	"Von" ("Hope")	Von	9:15
5.	"Hafsól" ("Sea Sun")	Von, same version as on "Hoppípolla"	9:46

Heim ("Home")
No.	Title	Original version appears on	Length
1.	"Samskeyti" ("Attachment")	( )	5:23
2.	"Starálfur" ("Staring Elf")	Ágætis byrjun	5:28
3.	"Vaka" (The name of Orri's daughter)	( )	5:20
4.	"Ágætis byrjun" ("A good beginning")	Ágætis byrjun	6:36
5.	"Heysátan" ("Haystack")	Takk...	4:43
6.	"Von" ("Hope")	Von	8:14

== Personnel ==
- Jón Þór Birgisson – vocals, guitar
- Kjartan Sveinsson – keyboard
- Georg Hólm – bass guitar
- Orri Páll Dýrason – drums

== Charts ==
Weekly chart performance for Hvarf/Heim
Chart (2007)	Peak position
Australian Albums (ARIA)	49
Belgian Albums (Ultratop Flanders)	18
Belgian Albums (Ultratop Wallonia)	57
Dutch Albums (Album Top 100)	92
French Albums (SNEP)	50
German Albums (Offizielle Top 100)	35
Irish Albums (IRMA)	15
Italian Albums (FIMI)	16
Norwegian Albums (VG-lista)	21
Portuguese Albums (AFP)	19
Spanish Albums (PROMUSICAE)	83
Swedish Albums (Sverigetopplistan)	45
Swiss Albums (Schweizer Hitparade)	44
UK Albums (OCC)	23
