= Ken Thomas (music producer) =

English record producer (died 2021)

- Born: Kenneth Vaughan Thomas
- Died: July 2021
- Genres: Ambient; dream pop; electronic; experimental; industrial; post-rock
- Occupations: Record producer; recording engineer; mixing engineer
- Labels: FatCat; One Little Indian; Mute; Fetish

Kenneth Vaughan Thomas (died July 2021) was an English record producer, recording engineer, and mixing engineer. As a record producer, he worked with artists such as the Bongos, Wire, Dave Gahan, Sigur Rós, and M83.

== Early career ==
His career in the music industry began as an assistant and engineer on sessions for groups like Public Image Ltd, the Buzzcocks, Wire, Alien Sex Fiend,, Psychic TV and Rush while working at Trident and Advision studios. In 1980, he composed and recorded the album Beat the Light. Due to his involvement with punk and experimental artists, he went on to work with Icelandic group the Sugarcubes as an engineer on their debut album Life's Too Good.

== Sigur Rós ==
Thomas' relationship with the Sugarcubes later resulted in his work with fellow Icelandic band Sigur Rós after Sugarcubes' guitarist Þór Eldon played him the group's debut album Von. Thomas went on to undertake production, engineering, and mixing duties for the group throughout several albums including Ágætis byrjun, ( ), and Takk... and also assisted in recording the performances for the documentary film Heima.

== Personal life ==
Ken was the father of fellow record producer Jolyon Vaughan Thomas. The two shared High Bank Studio and collaborated on projects. Ken was also the father of singer-songwriter Amy Odell, who provided vocals on his production of the Gavin Friday album Catholic.

Thomas was reported to have died in early July 2021 as acknowledged in online statements by Gavin Friday and Sigur Rós.
