= Rímur (album) =

Rímur EP

EP by Sigur Rós
- Released: 2001
- Genre: Post-rock
- Length: 26:40
- Label: Krúnk

Sigur Rós chronology
Ný batterí (2000)	Rímur EP (2001)	untitled 1 (a.k.a. Vaka) (2003)

Rímur is a limited EP record released independently by Sigur Rós featuring Steindór Andersen performing rímur. It was sold during the band's spring 2001 tour. Only 1000 copies of the EP were printed.

A live performance of "Á ferð til Breiðafjarðar vorið 1922" with Steindór later appeared on the band's 2007 DVD release Heima.

== Track listing ==
No.	Title	English translation (unofficial)	Length
1.	"Mansöngur" (with Sigur Rós)	Mansöngr	6:19
2.	"Rímur af Göngu-Hrólfi" (solo)	Rímur about Göngu-Hrólfr	1:00
3.	"Fjöll í austri" (with Sigur Rós)	Mountains in the east	6:00
4.	"Vorvísur" (solo)	Spring verses	1:29
5.	"Á ferð til Breiðafjarðar vorið 1922" (with Sigur Rós)	On a trip to Breiðafjörður in the spring of 1922	6:02
6.	"Lækurinn" (duet with Sigurður Sigurðarson)	Brook	5:50
