= Álafoss =

Waterfall in Iceland

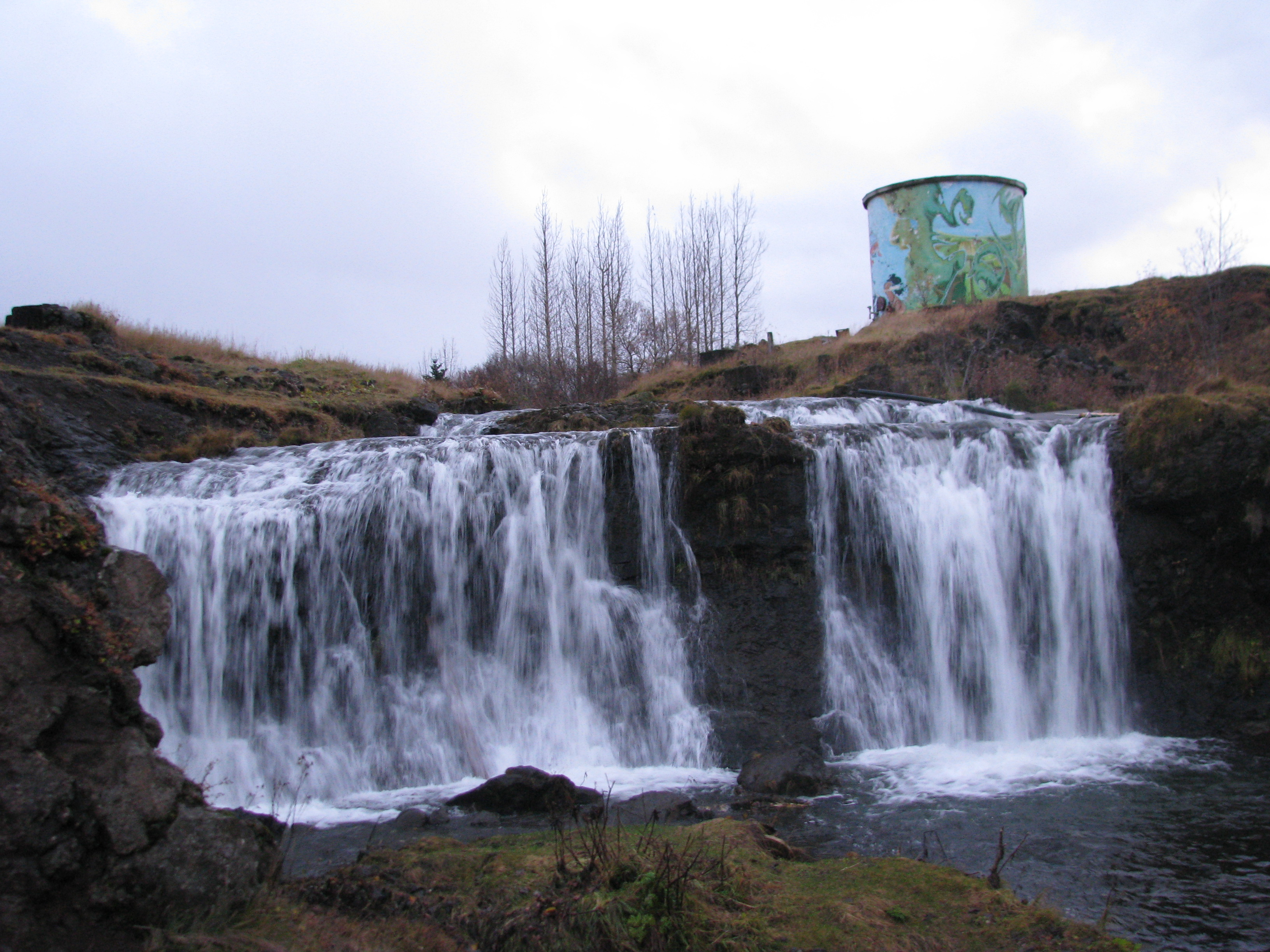

- Location within Iceland
- Location: Southwest of Iceland
- Coordinates: 64.1666°N 21.6758°W

Álafoss (Icelandic pronunciation: [ˈauːlaˌfɔsː]; eel falls) is a waterfall on the river Varmá in Mosfellsbær, Iceland.

== In culture ==
A wool factory of the same name has adjoined the waterfall since 1896, when a local farmer imported machinery to process wool using the energy from the waterfall.

During World War II, barracks were constructed there for British soldiers. Álafoss played a major role in the founding and growth of the town of Mosfellsbær.

The band Sigur Rós has a studio named Sundlaugin at Álafoss, and the otherwise untitled fifth track on the band's album ( ) is nicknamed after the area.

Mosfellsbær is also home to a football club named after the waterfall, Álafoss Football Club.

== See also ==
- List of waterfalls
- List of waterfalls in Iceland
