= Fljótavík =

Bay on Hornstrandir, Westfjords, Iceland

Coordinates: 66.445°N 22.958°W

Fljótavík (Icelandic pronunciation: [ˈfljouːtaˌviːk]) is a wide bay in the far north-west of Hornstrandir, in the Westfjords region in Iceland. It is a part of the nature reserve Hornstrandafriðland (status granted in 1975) which covers the northernmost tip of the Hornstrandir peninsula.

A deep valley rises from the bay and a shallow inlet (which is more of a lagoon).

It was settled during the settler age by Geirmundur heljarskinn who also settled nearby inlets and valleys. The area was deserted around the mid-twentieth century, but the descendants of the former inhabitants dwell there on occasion in summer cottages.

Icelandic post-rock band Sigur Rós named the ninth track of their 2008 album Með suð í eyrum við spilum endalaust after Fljótavík.
