= Inni =

Inni may refer to:

- Inni, a village in Thazi Township, Myanmar
- Inní ("inside") an album by the Icelandic band Sigur Rós
- Inni ("hymns"), Italian for national anthems, Inno delle nazioni
