= Ba Ba Ti Ki Di Do =

EP by Sigur Rós
- Released: 24 March 2004
- Recorded: 2003
- Genres: Ambient; ambient pop; electronic; minimalism
- Length: 20:44
- Labels: Geffen, Fat Cat
- Producer: Sigur Rós

Sigur Rós chronology
untitled 1 (a.k.a. "Vaka") (2003)	Ba Ba Ti Ki Di Do (2004)	Glósóli (2005)
untitled 1 (a.k.a. "Vaka") (2003)	Ba Ba Ti Ki Di Do (2004)	Sæglópur (2005)

Professional ratings
Review scores
Source	Rating
Pitchfork	(5.5/10)
Rolling Stone	2/5 stars

Ba Ba Ti Ki Di Do is an EP by Sigur Rós, released in 2004 by Geffen Records. The EP consists of the music which the band composed for Merce Cunningham's dance piece Split Sides, which Radiohead also composed music for. The piece involved choreography and music being composed independently of each other beforehand, so that the performances would have synchronicities by coincidence.

The title refers to the lyrics throughout the whole piece. Merce Cunningham was recorded saying the syllables "ba ba, ti ki, ba ba, di do", and it was promptly sampled for "Di Do".

Radiohead's music for the second half of Split Sides was only released on a DVD of the piece, and otherwise did not see release elsewhere.

== Track listing ==
1. "Ba Ba" – 6:12
2. "Ti Ki" – 8:49
3. "Di Do" – 5:42
