= Route One (disambiguation) =

Route One, Route one, or Route 1 may refer to:

- List of highways numbered 1
- List of public transport routes numbered 1
- Route one or Long ball, association football tactic
- Route One Rovers F.C., association football club in Bradford, England
- Route One (album), 2017 Sigur Rós remix album

== See also ==
- Route 1 Rivalry, American football rivalry between the University of Delaware and Delaware State University
- Route One or Die, 2011 album by Three Trapped Tigers
