= Gobbledigook (song) =

2008 single by Sigur Rós

Single by Sigur Rós

from the album Með suð í eyrum við spilum endalaust
- Released: 27 May 2008
- Recorded: January – April 2008
- Genre: Post-rock; art rock
- Length: 3:08
- Label: EMI
- Songwriters: Jón Þór Birgisson; Orri Páll Dýrason; Georg Hólm; Kjartan Sveinsson
- Producers: Sigur Rós; Flood

Sigur Rós singles chronology
"Hljómalind" (2007)	"Gobbledigook" (2008)	"Inní mér syngur vitleysingur" (2008)

Music video
- "Gobbledigook" on Vimeo

"Gobbledigook" is the first track on Sigur Rós' album Með suð í eyrum við spilum endalaust. It premiered on Zane Lowe's Radio 1 show in the UK on 27 May 2008.

On the European cover of the album, the song's title is spelled "Gobbeldigook". This song was number 55 on Rolling Stone's list of the 100 Best Songs of 2008; it also placed at number 71 in Pitchfork Media's "The 100 Best Tracks of 2008" list.

This song is also available on the video game Rocksmith from Ubisoft.

== Music video ==
The video for "Gobbledigook" was released on 27 May 2008 on sigurros.com. It was filmed in May 2008 by Arni & Kinski, who has previously directed the band's "Glósóli", "Viðrar vel til loftárása" and "Hoppípolla" videos, as well as collaborating with Ryan McGinley, whose recent work has been used as the cover art for Með suð í eyrum við spilum endalaust and the consequent singles. Cinematographer Christopher Doyle shot the video.

The video shows a group of 10 or so young adults participating in nudism or naturism.

== Track listing ==
Digital download, Promotional single
No.	Title	Length
1.	"Gobbledigook"	3:08

== Charts ==
Chart (2008)	Peak position
Belgium (Ultratip Bubbling Under Flanders)	69
Iceland (Tónlist)	9

== Release history ==
Region	Date	Format	Label	Catalog no.
France	27 May 2008	Digital download	EMI	n/a
Germany	27 May 2008	Digital download	EMI	n/a
Iceland	27 May 2008	Digital download	EMI	n/a
Netherlands	27 May 2008	Digital download	EMI	n/a
United Kingdom	27 May 2008	Digital download	EMI	n/a
Europe	27 May 2008	CD-R (Contemporary hit radio)	EMI	CDEMDJ755
United Kingdom	27 May 2008	CD-R (Contemporary hit radio, BBC Radio 1 rotation)	EMI	50999 2 27253 2 5
