= Hljómalind =

- Hljómalind cover

Single by Sigur Rós

from the album Hvarf/Heim
- B-side: "Starálfur"
- Released: 29 October 2007
- Recorded: 2007
- Genre: Post-rock
- Length: 4:56
- Label: EMI
- Songwriters: Jón Þór Birgisson; Orri Páll Dýrason; Georg Hólm; Kjartan Sveinsson
- Producer: Sigur Rós

Sigur Rós singles chronology
| "Sæglópur" (2006) | "Hljómalind" (2007) | "Gobbledigook" (2008) |

"Hljómalind" is a song by the Icelandic band Sigur Rós from their 2007 album Hvarf/Heim. It was released on heavyweight 7" vinyl as the album's first single (in Europe only) on 29 October 2007. The B-side of the single features a live acoustic version of the song "Starálfur". It reached #91 on the UK Singles Chart.

The band had performed the track live as a work in progress since 1999, when it was written as part of the Ágætis byrjun studio sessions. It was originally called "Rokklagið" ("The Rock Song"). The song wasn't released until 2007, when it was recorded in studio, and featured on the Hvarf album as Hljómalind. Before choosing this name, the song had the working title "The Rabbit and the Prince" (named after two friends of the band, Kiddi Kanína (or Kiddi The Rabbit) and sometime Sigur Rós roadie Valgarður "Valli" Bragason).

"Hljómalind" was a record store in Reykjavík which was run by Kristinn "Kiddi Kanína" Sæmundsson, the band's then-manager. The record shop started out as a mail-order operation, partially run from the Reykjavík flea market Kolaportið. It was for a time Iceland's only Indie Rock record store. The shop moved two times before ending up on Laugavegur 21, where it ran for many years before closing in 2003. The organic co-op café Kaffi Hljómalind later opened on the premises. The Hljómalind house is currently occupied by Kaffibrennslan, a café and sandwich shop. The name "Hljómalind" is made up of two words, "hljóma-", which means sounds or chords, and "-lind", which means fountain, spring or well. It could be translated as "a wellspring of sounds" or "a fountain of music".

== Track listing ==
=== 7" SINGLE UK ===
1. "Hljómalind" – 4:02
2. "Starálfur" (live acoustic) – 5:28

=== CD PROMO UK ===
1. "Hljómalind" – 4:02
2. "Starálfur" (live acoustic) – 5:28
3. "Hljómalind" (instrumental) – 4:57
