= ( ) (album) =

2002 studio album by Sigur Rós

Studio album by Sigur Rós
- Released: 28 October 2002
- Studios: Sundlaugin, Mosfellsbær, Iceland
- Genres: Post-rock; art rock; ambient
- Length: 71:46
- Language: Hopelandic
- Labels: FatCat; Bad Taste
- Producers: Sigur Rós; Ken Thomas

Sigur Rós chronology
Ágætis byrjun (1999)	( ) (2002)	Takk... (2005)

Singles from ( )
- 1. "Vaka" Released: 12 May 2003

( ) (also referred to as Svigaplatan, which translates to The Bracket Album) is the third studio album by Icelandic post-rock band Sigur Rós, released on 28 October 2002. It comprises eight untitled tracks, divided into two parts: the first four tracks are lighter and more optimistic, while the latter four are bleaker and more melancholic. The two-halves are divided by a 36-second silence, and the album opens and closes with a click of distortion. Lead singer Jón Þór Birgisson ("Jónsi") sang the album's lyrics entirely in "Hopelandic", a made-up language consisting of gibberish words. ( ) reached No. 51 on the Billboard 200 and received acclaim from music critics, although some reviewers found the album weaker than the band's previous album Ágætis byrjun.

This is the first album to feature drummer Orri Páll Dýrason who joined the band in 1999, replacing their previous drummer Ágúst Ævar Gunnarsson.

== Production ==
The album's title consists of two opposing parentheses, representing either the album's two halves, or the idea that the album has no title, leaving the listener free to determine it. Members of the band have referred to ( ) as Svigaplatan, which translates to "The Bracket Album". In the credits of the film Heima, it is referred to as The Untitled Album. The outside packaging of ( ) consists of a plastic protective sleeve with two parentheses cut out, revealing the image printed on the CD case underneath. There are four versions of this cover art, which consist of modified photographs of nature around the band's Mosfellsbær studio, sold in four parts of the world: Europe, the United States, Australia, and Japan. In Iceland, all four cover designs are sold. The back of the packaging shows an image of a sleepwalking boy, adapted from a photograph by John Yang. In 2011, Yang's daughter, Naomi Yang, of the band Galaxie 500, said that the band used the image without permission or payment to her father. There are no liner notes or production credits included, although packaged with the album is a booklet of twelve blank pages, on which listeners are invited to write or draw their own interpretations of the album's music. A limited-edition version of ( ) released in Spain includes a 94-page book of contemporary art.

( ) was co-produced and engineered by Ken Thomas, who also worked with the band on their previous album, Ágætis byrjun. This is the first album Sigur Rós recorded at their studio based in Álafoss, Mosfellsbær, a small rural town outside Reykjavík, Iceland. The band refers to the studio as "Sundlaugin", or "The Pool". ( ) includes the work of the string quartet Amiina. ( ) was given more production and recording time than Ágætis byrjun, although lead singer Jónsi considers the ( ) album "less polished" than its predecessor. He characterized the record as being "much more bare and alive and there are far fewer little slick things and much less sweet stuff". The strings of Ágætis byrjun were recorded in just two days, while two weeks were given for their recording on ( ). In addition, the former was performed by the Iceland Symphony Orchestra, while the latter was done by Amiina. Because of this, the string parts required less preparation prior to recording. The band "just let them 'jam' in the studio until everybody was happy", according to Jónsi.

== Music and lyrics ==
Dream pop is all about feeling, and Sigur Ros' ( ) embodies that. Sure, the trappings of an untitled album full of untitled tracks sung in a made-up language and split into two light and dark parts is a hat on a pretentious hat. But when you strip that away—and the whole point of it is that you should—what you're left with is pure feeling.

— Allison Keene of Paste (August 24, 2020)

( ) consists of eight tracks divided in half by thirty-six seconds of silence which, in concept, replicates the separation of two sides of a gramophone record. Ironically, on the actual vinyl version of the record, the thirty-six seconds of silence occurs in the middle of side 2 (the vinyl consists of 4 sides). The first half of the album is "light and optimistic" musically, with a heavier emphasis on the use of keyboards than guitar, and the sampling of Jónsi's voice. The second half is more melancholic, playing with the emotions of the listener, as described by Jónsi. None of the tracks on ( ) have titles; band guitarist and keyboardist Kjartan Sveinsson said of this choice, "we didn't want to put titles on the record just because there are supposed to be titles on the record." The songs are listed as "Untitled #1", "Untitled #2", etc., although each track has an unofficial name used by the band.

Jónsi sang the lyrics of ( ) entirely in "Vonlenska" ("Hopelandic"), a made-up "language" which consists of meaningless words and syllables. Jónsi uses Hopelandic in place of songs which do not yet have lyrics, although some tracks on Sigur Rós albums Von and Takk... are only sung in the language. Its names in English and Icelandic are derived from "Von" ("Hope" in English), the ninth track on the album Von, which is the first instance in which Hopelandic is used in the band's music. The Hopelandic of ( ) consists of one eleven-syllable phrase, with various permutations and subsequent variations thereof sung over the course of the album. ( ) is made up of material that Sigur Rós had been playing live for over two years. For this reason, the band did not want to give the songs actual lyrics. Drummer Orri Páll Dýrason said of this, "[the songs] were fully formed and it would have been strange to suddenly insert lyrics into these finished products."

== Release ==
Pitchfork placed ( ) 29th on its list of the fifty best albums of 2002, and 135th on its list of the top 200 albums of the 2000s (decade). The album also peaked at No. 51 on the Billboard 200. A music video for "Untitled #1" directed by Floria Sigismondi was released in April 2003. The video depicts a dystopian future in which schoolchildren wearing gas masks are playing amidst black snow and a red sky. In November 2003, Sigismondi's video was given the award for "Best Video" at the MTV Europe Music Awards in Edinburgh, UK.

== Critical reception ==
Professional ratings
Aggregate scores
Source	Rating
Metacritic	82/100
Review scores
Source	Rating
AllMusic	4/5 stars
Alternative Press	5/5 stars
Entertainment Weekly	B+
Los Angeles Times	3.5/4 stars
NME	7/10
Pitchfork	7.6/10 (2002); 8.2/10 (2022)
Q	4/5 stars
Rolling Stone	4/5 stars
Spin	8/10
The Village Voice	C

( ) received critical acclaim, holding a Metacritic score of 82/100 based on twenty reviews, which makes it the twenty-sixth highest-scored album of 2002 according to Metacritic. Daniel Becker of Dusted Magazine wrote that the album is "gorgeous music..the songs are vast, unhurried, and vivid, and that only makes them more powerful." He considers ( ) a "logical extension of Ágætis Byrjun, relying on the same interplay of instruments to create a similarly picturesque and eerily calm atmosphere." Chris Ott of Pitchfork wrote that "Sigur Rós' music has all the depth, resonance and humanity of a Brueghel landscape, and is best appreciated at loud volumes in open spaces, as a soundtrack for scenery, real or imagined." Sean Adams of Drowned in Sound said that "( ) is as pioneering, unnerving, inspiring, confusing, as lyrically anarchic as every thing that has moved the world, ever" and "why I love music, why this website has this name and why art exists. ( ) [is] yours to discover." Gavin Mueller of Stylus Magazine found that Jónsi's voice "never [has] sounded more exposed, giving [the band] a strength that Ágætis Byrjun often obscured. The final track's ultimate climax is nothing short of harrowing, as a crashing storm of frantic drum fills overwhelms Birgisson's urgent guitar strumming and plaintive wail."

Andy Kellman of AllMusic said that with ( ), Sigur Rós made "only adjustments – no significant developments – in the group's sound" and that "The fact that the emotional extremes are few and far between makes the album difficult to wade through". Ott wrote that ( ) "doesn't shine with the same nascent glimmer as its predecessor. If the band weren't so headstrong, it wouldn't even be a consideration, but from the beginning they've claimed they would change music forever, and that this record in particular would be even better than [Ágætis byrjun]". In addition, he found the album's main Hopelandic phrase repetitive, and that ( ) lacked the innovation of its predecessor. Gavin Edwards of Rolling Stone called ( ) "impressive" but "remarkably similar" in sound; "it's just packaged more pretentiously." Ott said of the blank booklet included with ( ), "I fail to see how this tactic enriches the band's cinematic balladry", adding, "evidence that they just thought it would be cool to package the record this way is abundant". Mueller called the title of ( ) "forehead-slappingly pretentious", and considered the album's nameless tracks "a jab at Yorke-worshippers who couldn't pronounce the Icelandic titles of Sigur Ros's previous work anyway." In his review for PopMatters, music critic Matt Cibula wrote, "I don't think there are any real meanings to these songs, other than the ones we bring to them, each on our own", adding:

My only clue – and here I'm cheating massively – is that I saw them in concert a month ago, and these songs were invariably accompanied by hazy images of children, of childhood ... but even if this stuff is about the end of childhood or innocence or any of those trotted-out tropes, I wouldn't know, and it probably tells you more about me than the opening section of this record.

A book on the album was released in the 33 1/3 series on 28 August 2014. The series are short books inspired by or focused on albums and are generally written as longform essays. The book, written by composer Ethan Hayden, was cited by Pitchfork as one of the "33 Best 33 1/3 Books".

=== Media usage ===
A snippet from "Untitled #8" can be heard during the trailer for the Oliver Hirschbiegel film The Invasion (2007). "Untitled #7" is featured in the trailer for the 2008 video game Dead Space. "Untitled #4", as well as "Svefn-g-englar" and the title track from Ágætis byrjun and a video backdrop used during a Sigur Rós concert in Los Angeles, are featured in the film Vanilla Sky (2001). This was the first case of the band licensing their music for a movie; Jónsi allowed for it in part "because he thought the idea of Tom Cruise acting over their music was 'funny'". "Untitled #4" was played in the American TV series Queer as Folk, as well as the season 3 finale of Canadian TV series Orphan Black (2015). "Untitled #3", listed as its alternate title "Samskeyti", was used in the credits for the Gregg Araki-directed film Mysterious Skin (2004, based on the 1995 novel by Scott Heim), in an episode from the second season of the British serial drama Skins (2008), in the 2009 film The Boys Are Back (directed by Scott Hicks and starring Clive Owen) during the final shots, and in the 2020 film Eurovision Song Contest: The Story of Fire Saga. Various tracks off ( ) were used in the American crime drama CSI: Miami. "Vaka" was also heavily used in the soundtrack to the 2010 Norwegian film King of Devil's Island. The 2006 Academy Award-nominated Danish film After the Wedding also uses "Untitled #1" ("Vaka") as background music during the funeral of a major character. Multiple songs from the album are incorporated into the soundtrack for the 2024 video game Snufkin: Melody of Moominvalley, based on the popular Moomin series.

== Track listing ==
All tracks are officially untitled, although each track has an alternate name by which the band refers to it. These names are also used for digital platforms.

All tracks are written by Sigur Rós.

No.	Title	Meaning of alternate title	Length
1.	Untitled ("Vaka")	The name of Orri's daughter	6:38
2.	Untitled ("Fyrsta")	The first song	7:33
3.	Untitled ("Samskeyti")	Attachment	6:33
4.	Untitled ("Njósnavélin")	Literally, "The Spy Machine"; also known as "The Nothing Song"	7:33
5.	Untitled ("Álafoss")	Álafoss is the location of the band's studio	9:57
6.	Untitled ("E-Bow")	Georg Hólm uses an E-bow on his bass in this song	8:48
7.	Untitled ("Dauðalagið")	The death song	13:00
8.	Untitled ("Popplagið")	The pop song	11:44
Total length:			71:46

Deluxe edition: disc 2

No.	Title	Length
1.	Untitled ("Smáskifa 1")	4:38
2.	Untitled ("Smáskifa 2")	2:47
3.	Untitled ("Smáskifa 3")	4:22
4.	Untitled ("Dauðalagið") (Jacobs Studio Sessions)	11:09
5.	Untitled ("Popplagið") (Jacobs Studio Sessions)	13:14
6.	Untitled ("E-Bow") (Jacobs Studio Sessions)	8:02

== Personnel ==
Sigur Rós

- Jón Þór Birgisson – vocals, guitar, keyboards
- Kjartan Sveinsson – keyboards, guitar
- Georg Hólm – bass guitar, keyboards, glockenspiel
- Orri Páll Dýrason – drums, keyboards

Amiina

- María Huld Markan – violin
- Edda Rún Ólafsdóttir – violin
- Ólöf Júlía Kjartansdóttir – viola
- Sólrún Sumarliðadóttir – cello

Production

- Sigur Rós – production
- Ken Thomas – production, engineering, mixing
- Marco Migliari – engineering
- Mandy Parnell – mastering

== Charts ==
=== Weekly charts ===
Weekly chart performance for ( )
Chart (2002)	Peak position
Australian Albums (ARIA)	49
Austrian Albums (Ö3 Austria)	53
Belgian Albums (Ultratop Flanders)	33
Belgian Albums (Ultratop Wallonia)	50
Danish Albums (Hitlisten)	24
Dutch Albums (Album Top 100)	59
Finnish Albums (Suomen virallinen lista)	24
French Albums (SNEP)	19
German Albums (Offizielle Top 100)	33
Icelandic Albums (Tónlist)	1
Irish Albums (IRMA)	17
Norwegian Albums (VG-lista)	6
Swedish Albums (Sverigetopplistan)	50
Swiss Albums (Schweizer Hitparade)	86
UK Albums (OCC)	49
US Billboard 200	51

Chart (2025)	Peak position
Icelandic Albums (Tónlistinn)	15

=== Year-end charts ===
Year-end chart performance for ( )
Chart (2002)	Position
Canadian Alternative Albums (Nielsen SoundScan)	169

== Certifications and sales ==
Certifications and sales for ( )
Region	Certification	Certified units/sales
Belgium (BRMA)	Gold	25,000^{*}
Iceland	—	8,000
United Kingdom (BPI)	Gold	100,000^{^}
United States	—	332,000
Summaries
Europe	—	400,000
^{*} Sales figures based on certification alone.^{^} Shipments figures based on certification alone.
