= Steindór Andersen =

Icelandic musician (1954–2025)

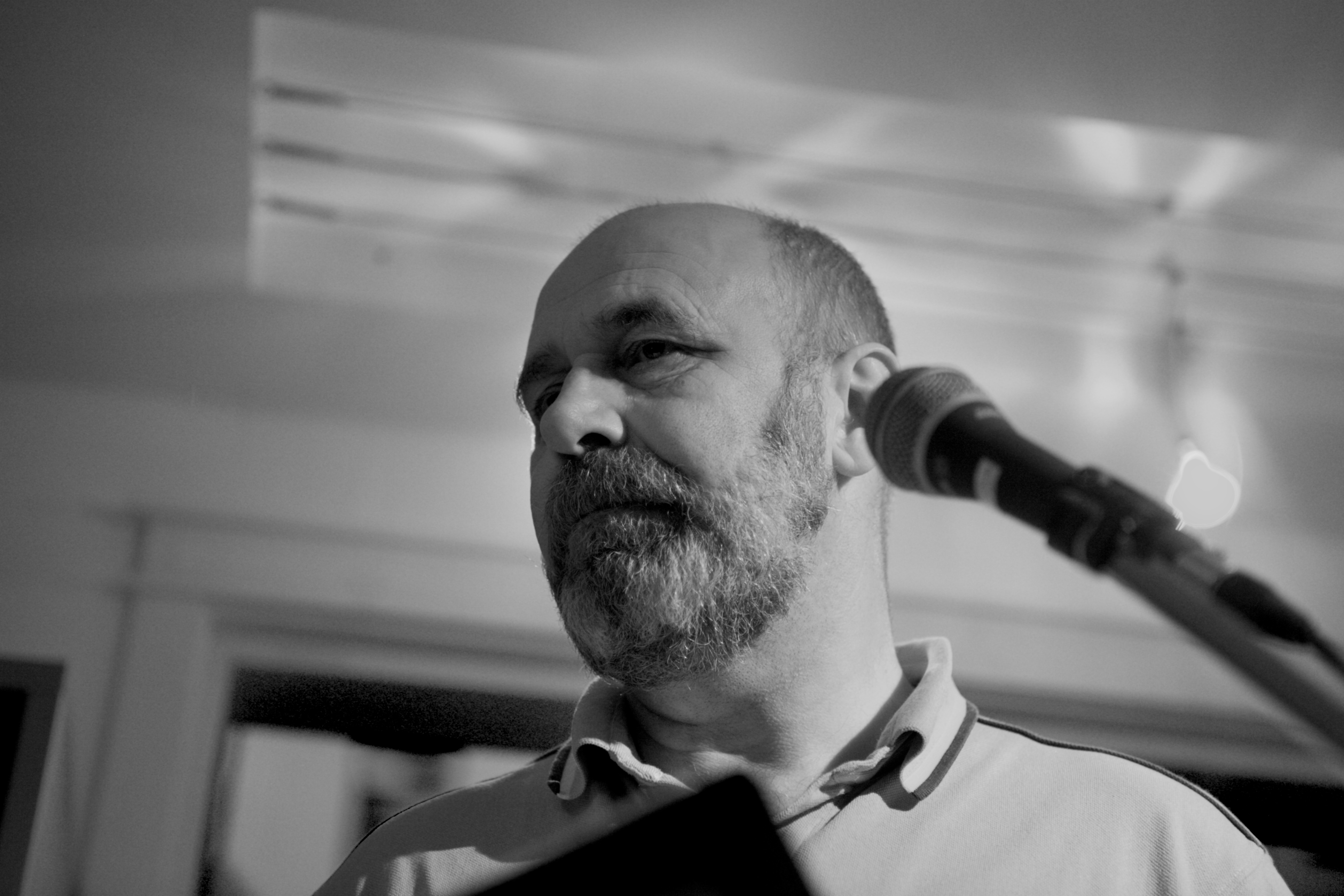

Steindór Andersen (2 September 1954 – 12 April 2025) was an Icelandic musician.

Steindór was noted for his rímur chanting and was most widely known for his collaborations with the band Sigur Rós. Other collaborations include with Hilmar Örn Hilmarsson and rapper Erpur Eyvindarson.

== Background ==
Steindór also worked as a fisherman and was the chairman of Iðunn a poetic society. He died on 12 April 2025, at the age of 70.

== Discography ==
- 2001: Rímur EP (featuring Sigur Rós)
- 2002: Rímur & Rapp (joint with Hilmar Örn Hilmarsson and Erpur Eyvindarson)
- 2003: Rímur
- 2004: Úlfhamsrímur
- 2013: Stafnbúi (joint with Hilmar Örn Hilmarsson)
- 2020: Odin's Raven Magic (joint with Sigur Rós, Hilmar Örn Hilmarsson et al.)

Appearances

After the Folk Music Festival in Siglufjörður, July 2007, where Steindór was a regular guest, another guest musician at the festival, Evan Harlan of the group Andromeda, impressed with Steindór's chanting of the rímur, composed the piece "Steindór Gets the Blues". The music was premiered in Boston, the home of the Icelandic-American group, later the same month.

Steindór also appears on Sigur Rós's 2007 DVD release, Heima, performing "Hugann seiða svalli frá" from Rímur.

== Filmography ==
- 2005: Screaming Masterpiece (Gargandi snilld)
