= Von brigði =

Remix album by Sigur Rós
- Released: 1998
- Genre: Post-rock
- Length: 54:30
- Label: Smekkleysa SM67

Sigur Rós chronology
Von (1997)	Von brigði (1998)	Ágætis byrjun (1999)

Professional ratings
Review scores
Source	Rating
Allmusic	3/5 stars

Von brigði is a remix album of Icelandic band Sigur Rós' first album, Von. It was released in 1998 on Smekkleysa Records, and continues to be available only in Iceland or through the band's online store. An LP containing four tracks from the album was also released, although only 100 copies of this green-colored edition were made.

Von brigði's title is a play on words. The word "Vonbrigði" means "disappointment", but split in two it translates as "variations on Von", "brigði" meaning "variation". A full translation into English would result in "hope variation".

The last song on the album is a song by Sigur Rós which the band meant to go on Von, but couldn't be finished in time.

== Track listing ==
No.	Title	Length
1.	"Syndir Guðs (Recycled by Biogen)" ("Sins of God")	6:54
2.	"Syndir Guðs (Recycled by múm)" ("Sins of God")	4:50
3.	"Leit af lífi (Recycled by Plasmic)" ("Search for life")	5:24
4.	"Myrkur (Recycled by Ilo)" ("Darkness")	5:28
5.	"Myrkur (Recycled by Dirty-Bix)" ("Darkness")	5:00
6.	"180 sekúndur fyrir sólarupprás (Recycled by Curver)" ("180 seconds before sunrise")	2:56
7.	"Hún Jörð … (Recycled by Hassbræður)" ("Mother Earth …")	5:17
8.	"Leit af lífi (Recycled by Thor)" ("Search for life")	5:32
9.	"Von (Recycled by GusGus)" ("Hope")	7:22
10.	"Leit af lífi (Recycled by Sigur Rós)" ("Search for life")	5:01
Total length:		54:44
