= Ný batterí =

Single by Sigur Rós

from the album Ágætis byrjun
- Released: 20 March 2000 (UK)
- Genre: Post-rock; ambient; dream pop; dark jazz
- Length: 24:02
- Label: Fat Cat Records
- Songwriter: Sigur Rós
- Producer: Sigur Rós

Sigur Rós singles chronology
"Svefn-g-englar" (1999)	"Ný batterí" (2000)	"Vaka" (2003)

"Ný batterí" (Icelandic for "new batteries") is a song by Sigur Rós, released as the second single from their album Ágætis byrjun in May 2000. The first track is an extended brass intro for "Ný batterí" (credited as "performed by the SS brass band"), followed by the title track. "Bíum bíum bambaló" is a traditional Icelandic lullaby, while "Dánarfregnir og jarðarfarir" was a theme used in Iceland for death announcements on radio. The third and fourth tracks also appear on the Angels of the Universe soundtrack.

The cymbal used in "Ný batterí" was found on a street in downtown Reykjavík. The instrument was bent and had apparently been driven over. However, they liked the way it sounded and wrote the song from there.

== Track listing ==
No.	Title	English translation	Length
1.	"Rafmagnið búið"	"The electricity is done"	4:52
2.	"Ný batterí"	"New batteries"	7:50
3.	"Bíum bíum bambaló"		6:52
4.	"Dánarfregnir og jarðarfarir"	"Obituaries and funerals"	4:29
Total length:			24:02

== Covers ==
- The post-hardcore band Thursday covered this song as a bonus track on the Japanese version of their album War All The Time.
