= Svefn-g-englar =

1999 single by Sigur Rós

Single by Sigur Rós

from the album Ágætis byrjun
- Released: 27 September 1999 (UK)
- Genre: Post-rock; slowcore; dream pop
- Length: 10:04 (album); 9:16 (single)
- Label: Fat Cat; Smekkleysa; PIAS
- Producer: Ken Thomas

Sigur Rós singles chronology
"Svefn-g-englar" (1999)	"Ný batterí" (2000)

Music video
- "Svefn-g-englar" on YouTube

"Svefn-g-englar" is a song by the Icelandic post-rock band Sigur Rós, from their second album, Ágætis byrjun.

== Overview ==
"Svefn-g-englar" was released as a single in 1999, with two studio recordings — "Svefn-g-englar" (an Icelandic pun mixing "sleepwalkers" and "sleep angels") and "Viðrar vel til loftárása" ("good weather for airstrikes"), both from Ágætis byrjun — and two songs recorded live at the Icelandic Opera House located in Reykjavík — "Nýja lagið" ("new song"), which was never recorded in studio, and "Syndir Guðs" ("God's sins"), from the group's first LP, Von. The single was the first UK release for the band, issued on Fat Cat Records in 1999. On its release, it was named "Single of the Week" in NME. In 2001, it was re-issued, in the United States, on PIAS records. The single is available both on compact disc and 12 inch vinyl, with somewhat different selections of tracks, including "Veröld ný og óð" ("new and old world").

The music video for "Svefn-g-englar" was directed by August Jacobsson. The video features the Perlan special-needs theatre group, an Icelandic acting troupe of men and women with Down syndrome. Choreography was by Lára Stefánsdóttir, and the angel outfits were made by Binna & Nína.

== In media ==
- "Svefn-g-englar" is used in the Vanilla Sky Soundtrack.
- "Svefn-g-englar" is on the DVD release of We know where you live
- It was played over the credits of season 2, episode 2 (production code 202) of Queer as Folk.
- "Svefn-g-englar" is used in the movie Ben X (Belgium) (also on the soundtrack CD).
- Used in the CSI: Crime Scene Investigation episode, "Slaves of Las Vegas".
- Used in a nature sequence in Leonardo DiCaprio's The 11th Hour.
- Portions were used in ABC's V in episode 4 of season 1 during the 'Bliss' scene.
- Used in the first series of Rolf on Art in the episode about Paul Gauguin.
- Played in the French Canadian film, Café de Flore, released in 2011.
- Used in the third series of Misfits in the first episode.
- Used in the French/Canadian sci-fi romance film Upside Down.
- Used in David Firth's animated short "Alan: An Alternative Superhero".
- Used in the fourth episode, "Man Down", of History Channel's military drama series SIX.
- Used in the US movie Beautiful Boy.
- Used in the US radio program This American Life episode "The Giant Pool of Money".
- Used in the US movie Eurovision Song Contest: The Story of Fire Saga.
- Used in the US documentary California Typewriter
- Used in the second episode, “Pocket Savior”, of the CBS miniseries The Stand
- Used in the US movie Beetlejuice Beetlejuice

== Track listings ==
=== CD version ===
1. "Svefn-g-englar" (single edit) – 9:16
2. "Viðrar vel til loftárása" – 10:13
3. "Nýja lagið" (live at the Icelandic Opera House, June 12, 1999) – 9:28
4. "Syndir Guðs" (live at the Icelandic Opera House, June 12, 1999) – 5:46

=== 12" version ===
1. "Svefn-g-englar" (single edit) – 9:16
2. "Viðrar vel til loftárása" – 10:13
3. "Veröld ný og óð" – 3:29
