= Vaka (song) =

Single by Sigur Rós

from the album ( )
- Released: May 2003
- Recorded: Sundlaugin; Mosfellsbær, Iceland
- Genre: Post-rock; ambient
- Length: 18:30
- Label: Smekkleysa; Fat Cat
- Songwriter: Sigur Rós
- Producer: Sigur Rós

Sigur Rós singles chronology
"Ný batterí" (2000)	"Vaka" (2003)	"Glósóli" (2005)

Music video
- "Untitled #1 a.k.a Vaka" on YouTube

Professional ratings
Review scores
Source	Rating
Pitchfork Media	(7.1/10)

"Vaka" (released as "untitled #1 (a.k.a. "Vaka")") is the common name for the untitled first track and lead single from Sigur Rós' 2002 album ( ). As late as 12 November 2006 the single remained fifteenth in the Canadian singles chart, having spent a total of 16 weeks in the top 20.

The band closed their set with tracks 2 and 3 from this single during their spring 2003 tour, calling the two songs "Smáskífa" (single) on their set list. Track 2 was originally meant to be a remix of "Vaka" but it turned out into a different song altogether, although some remnants of "Vaka"'s melody can still be heard. Track 3 features a solo on piano by drummer Orri Páll Dýrason. Track 4 is the music looped before and after Sigur Rós' live shows.

The single was released as a 3" limited mini CD, 5" CD with DVD, and as a 10" limited vinyl gatefold sleeve with an artwork stencil. The 3" mini CD was only released in Europe, and is labeled as featuring a new 12 minute track though there are four separate tracks on the disc. The DVD accompanying the 5" CD contains the first three music videos the band has made: "Svefn-g-englar", "Viðrar vel til loftárása" and "Vaka". The menu screen has a video which the band shot of some birds on a wire, with track four from the single playing.

== Music video ==
Directed by Floria Sigismondi, the music video shows a post-apocalyptic world in which children, attending school, get ready to go outside and play. The children, after having their ears and mouths inspected by the faculty, putting on many layers of clothes as well as ominous gas masks, exit the school building and emerge to a yard covered in black ash, which falls from the red sky like snow. The children play in the ash, throwing it at one another and making snowmen out of it as well as roughhousing with each other, causing one of the kids to lose her gas mask. Her classmates gather around her as she falls to the ground and eventually closes her eyes.

The video won the "Best Video" award at the 2003 MTV Europe Music Awards in Edinburgh, Scotland. The music video was originally planned for another song on the album, "untitled #4" (a.k.a. "Njósnavélin").

The song is also used extensively in the film After the Wedding.

== Track listing ==
- CD - 3" mini CD / 5" CD with DVD
1. "untitled #1" (a.k.a. Vaka) – 6:43
2. track 2 – 4:38
3. track 3 – 2:47
4. track 4 – 4:22
