= Inní mér syngur vitleysingur =

Single by Sigur Rós

from the album Með suð í eyrum við spilum endalaust
- B-side: "Heima"
- Released: 7 September 2008
- Recorded: January – April 2008
- Genre: Indie rock; dream pop; indie pop
- Length: 4:05
- Label: EMI
- Songwriters: Jón Þór Birgisson; Orri Páll Dýrason; Georg Hólm; Kjartan Sveinsson
- Producers: Sigur Rós; Flood

Sigur Rós singles chronology
"Gobbledigook" (2008)	"Inní mér syngur vitleysingur" (2008)	"Við spilum endalaust" (2008)

Music video
- "Inní mér syngur vitleysingur" on YouTube

"Inní mér syngur vitleysingur" (Icelandic for "Within me a lunatic sings") is the second track on Sigur Rós' fifth album, Með suð í eyrum við spilum endalaust. It is the first single from the album and was released on 8 September 2008.

A music video for "Inní mér syngur vitleysingur" was also released. It shows the band performing at the free Náttúra (Nature) concert in Reykjavík on 28 June 2008.

Vocals from this track were sampled by the experimental electronic duo Crystal Castles, in the song "Year of Silence", on their second self-titled release, Crystal Castles.

== Track listing ==
Digital download, CD
No.	Title	Length
1.	"Inní mér syngur vitleysingur"	4:05
2.	"Heima"	3:58

Promotional single
No.	Title	Length
1.	"Inní mér syngur vitleysingur"	4:05

== Personnel ==
Sigur Rós

- Jón Þór Birgisson - vocals, guitar
- Georg Hólm - bass
- Kjartan Sveinsson - keyboard, piano
- Orri Páll Dýrason - drums

== Charts ==
Chart (2008)	Peak position
Belgium (Ultratip Bubbling Under Flanders)	16
Iceland (Tónlist)	8
UK Singles (Official Charts)	152

== Release history ==
Region	Date	Format	Label	Catalog no.
Australia	7 September 2008	Digital download	EMI	n/a
France	7 September 2008	Digital download	EMI	n/a
Germany	7 September 2008	Digital download	EMI	n/a
Iceland	7 September 2008	Digital download	EMI	n/a
Netherlands	7 September 2008	Digital download	EMI	n/a
United Kingdom	7 September 2008	Digital download	EMI	n/a
United States	7 September 2008	Digital download	EMI	n/a
United Kingdom	8 September 2008	CD-R (Contemporary hit radio)	EMI	CDEMDJ757; 50999 234778 2 7
United Kingdom	15 September 2008	CD	EMI	CDEM 757; 50999 237978 2 6
