= Viðrar vel til loftárása =

Song by Sigur Rós

from the album Ágætis byrjun
- Genre: Post-rock; space rock
- Length: 10:13
- Label: Fat Cat, Smekkleysa
- Songwriters: Jón Þór Birgisson, Orri Páll Dýrason, Georg Hólm, Kjartan Sveinsson
- Producer: Ken Thomas

Music video
- "Viðrar vel til loftárása" on YouTube

"Viðrar vel til loftárása" (Icelandic for "it's good weather for airstrikes"; pronounced [ˈvɪðrar vɛl tʰɪl ˈlɔftaurausa]) is a song written and recorded by Icelandic post-rock band Sigur Rós for their second studio album Ágætis byrjun. The song appears as the seventh track on the album. It was also released as the B-side of Sigur Rós' debut single "Svefn-g-englar".

== Background ==
The band named the song after a quote sarcastically spoken by an Icelandic weatherman during the Kosovo War: "í dag viðrar vel til loftárása" (meaning "today is good weather for an airstrike").

The song is in the key of A major, specifically in E mixolydian mode.

== Music video ==
The band recorded a music video for the track. Set in 1950s Iceland, it features a football match between two teams of young boys. As one team scores a goal and celebrates, two young boys on the same team begin to kiss. The kiss is eventually broken up by the boys' fathers. All band members appear in cameo in the video: Jón Þór Birgisson is the soccer team coach, Orri Páll Dýrason is the scorekeeper, Georg Hólm is the referee, and Kjartan Sveinsson is one of the spectators. The fetus design from the Ágætis byrjun album cover is shown on a bottle from which one of the boys drinks.

Production for the music video began in the autumn of 2001. A general casting call was held in Reykjavík,, the location for principal photography was in Hvalfjörður by the old whale fishing dock. The video was directed by Icelandic directors Stefán Árni Þorgeirsson and Sigurður Kjartansson. The video won an Icelandic Music Award for "Best Video" in 2002. Music magazine NME ranked the video 9th on their list of "100 Greatest Music Videos".

The idea for the video came from Sigur Rós' former drummer Ágúst Ævar Gunnarsson.

== Accolades ==
Accolades for "Viðrar vel til loftárása"
| Year | Ceremony | Award | Result |
|---|---|---|---|
| 2002 | Samtónn Íslensku tónlistarverðlaunin | Best Video | Won |
