= Sæglópur =

Single by Sigur Rós

from the album Takk...
- Released: 16 August 2005 (first issue); 10 July 2006 (second issue)
- Genre: Post-rock
- Label: EMI
- Songwriters: Jón Þór Birgisson; Orri Páll Dýrason; Georg Hólm; Kjartan Sveinsson
- Producer: Sigur Rós

Sigur Rós singles chronology
"Glósóli" (2005)	"Sæglópur" (2005)	"Hoppípolla" (2005)
"Hoppípolla" (2005)	"Sæglópur" (2006)	"Hljómalind" (2007)

Second Issue (2006)

Music video
- "Sæglópur" on YouTube

Professional ratings
Review scores
Source	Rating
Pitchfork Media	(5.7/10)

"Sæglópur" (Icelandic for "lost at sea" or "lost seafarer") is a song by Sigur Rós, released in 2006 as a single from the 2005 album Takk.... Parts of the song are in Icelandic, although a lengthy portion is in Hopelandic, a "language" of nonsense words selected by the band that sound similar to Icelandic.

== Music video ==
The music video for the song track depicts the drowning of a young child, who is, towards the end of the video, rescued by a diver and, as in the "Glósóli" video, whether the child survives is left for the viewer to decide.

== Use of the song ==
A part of "Sæglópur" was used by video game developers Ubisoft Montreal, for their Prince of Persia trailer on the E3 2008 event in Los Angeles on 15 July 2008. The song has continued to be used by the company, appearing in the televised commercials for the game. A clip of the song had also been used in an ad aimed at young people with eating disorders, running on Swedish television by Anorexi Bulimi-Kontakt. The ad was released in 2007.

Also, parts of this song have been used in the British car review television series Top Gear on numerous occasions.

Parts of the song were used in the trailer for Julie Taymor's film adaptation of Shakespeare's The Tempest.

The intro of this song is used in one of the Invisible Children Bracelet Campaign videos: "Roseline: The Story of an AIDS Victim." It can be heard during part of the documentary and as the DVD menu music.

Parts of the song are used in previews of Human Planet on Discovery Channel.

Parts of the song were used for the trailer of the second half of the first season of the Starz hit show, Outlander.

The song is used extensively in the documentary film We Live in Public and aides the climax of the scene in which the growing insanity of the participants inside the "Quiet" bunker experiment is explored.

The trailer for the film version of the Man Booker Prize-winning book Life of Pi features the song.

This song was also featured in the final episode of Netflix's Sense8 Season 1 (2015) and in the last episode of New Amsterdam season 1 (2019).

The song is played in an early scene of the 2018 movie Aquaman.

The song is featured in a scene where Aquaman enters the ocean in Iceland in the 2021 release of Zack Snyder's Justice League.

== Release history ==
"Sæglópur" was released three times in different formats:

- Prior to the release of Takk... the song was made available as a download only single on the North-American iTunes store (2005). "Glósóli" was made available simultaneously on the European iTunes Store.
- Japan Tour EP (2006). An enhanced CD, containing the "Glósóli" and "Hoppípolla" videos.
- CD/DVD double pack single (2006). The DVD featured the "Glósóli", "Hoppípolla" and "Sæglópur" videos.

== Track listing ==
Japan Tour EP

1. "Sæglópur" ("Lost at sea") – 8:12
2. "Refur" ("Fox") – 2:45
3. "Ó friður" ("Oh Peace"; a word with a double meaning similar to Vonbrigði; in this case ó Friður means "Oh Peace" but ófriður means "War") – 4:48
4. "Kafari" ("Diver") – 6:11
5. "Hafsól" ("The ocean's sun") – 9:59

CD/DVD single

1. "Sæglópur" (8:12)
2. "Refur" (2:45)
3. "Ó friður" (4:48)
4. "Kafari" (6:11)
