= Með suð í eyrum við spilum endalaust =

2008 album by Sigur Rós

Studio album by Sigur Rós
- Released: 20 June 2008
- Recorded: January – April 2008
- Studios: Sundlaugin, Abbey Road Studios, Langholtskirkja and Cuba
- Genres: Post-rock; dream pop; indie rock; art rock; folk rock
- Length: 55:36
- Languages: Icelandic, English
- Labels: EMI, XL Recordings
- Producers: Sigur Rós and Flood

Sigur Rós chronology
Hvarf/Heim (2007)	Með suð í eyrum við spilum endalaust (2008)	Valtari (2012)

Singles from Við spilum endalaust
- 1. "Gobbledigook" Released: 27 May 2008; 2. "Inní mér syngur vitleysingur" Released: 7 September 2008; 3. "Við spilum endalaust" Released: 9 November 2008

Music video
- "Við spilum endalaust"

Professional ratings
Aggregate scores
Source	Rating
Metacritic	81/100
Review scores
Source	Rating
AllMusic	4/5 stars
The A.V. Club	A
The Guardian	4/5 stars
The Independent	3/5 stars
Mojo	4/5 stars
NME	6/10
Pitchfork	7.5/10
Q	4/5 stars
Rolling Stone	4/5 stars
Spin	3.5/5 stars

Með suð í eyrum við spilum endalaust (Icelandic: [mɛð ˈsʏːð i ˈeiːrʏm vɪð ˈspɪːlʏm ˈɛntaløyst], With a Buzz in Our Ears We Play Endlessly) is the fifth full-length studio album by the Icelandic post-rock band Sigur Rós, released on 23 June 2008.

All the lyrics for the album were originally intended to be in English, but in the end the band decided that Icelandic felt more natural to them. Some lyrics were translated back into Icelandic, while some songs got completely new texts. It is the band's first album to feature a track sung in English ("All Alright"). The first track on the album, "Gobbledigook", premiered on Zane Lowe's BBC Radio 1 music show in the UK on 27 May 2008. "Festival" was premiered on Colin Murray's Radio 1 show on 3 June 2008. "Inní mér syngur vitleysingur" was used as the theme tune for Colin Murray's Gold Run, which aired on BBC Radio 5 Live during the run-up to the 2012 Summer Olympics. In December 2008, American webzine Somewhere Cold ranked Með suð í eyrum við spilum endalaust No. 3 on their 2008 Somewhere Cold Awards Hall of Fame.

In general, the music continues Sigur Rós' departure from their generally ethereal and minimalist music, being (as the title and cover suggest) more playful and fanciful than their early work, featuring more traditional guitar melodies, acoustic instrumentation, and folk-oriented compositions following in the vein of their later albums.

The album was available for pre-order from 3 June on the band's official media site, and on 5 June, the band performed "Gobbledigook", "Inní mér syngur vitleysingur", "Festival", "Fljótavík", "Við spilum endalaust" and "All Alright" live in Guadalajara, Mexico. On 8 June, the full album streamed early on the Sigur Rós dót widget. On 19 June, pre-ordered albums began arriving in the mail.

The album's cover features a photograph by Ryan McGinley, entitled "Highway". Originally the album artwork was going to be done by Olafur Eliasson; it would have been the first time the band had passed album artwork to an external artist. In the end they did not like the proposed design and created the cover art themselves using the photograph.

The song "All Alright" played a central role in Neil Jordan's 2009 film Ondine whilst "Festival" featured in the 2010 Danny Boyle film 127 Hours. Multiple songs from the album also featured in the 2009 film The Boys Are Back.

== Track listing ==
Með suð í eyrum við spilum endalaust track listing
No.	Title	Translated title	Length
1.	"Gobbledigook"		3:08
2.	"Inní mér syngur vitleysingur"	Within me a lunatic sings	4:05
3.	"Góðan daginn"	Good morning	5:15
4.	"Við spilum endalaust"	We play endlessly	3:33
5.	"Festival"		9:24
6.	"Með suð í eyrum"	With a buzz in our ears	4:56
7.	"Ára bátur"	Row boat	8:57
8.	"Íllgresi"	Weeds	4:13
9.	"Fljótavík"		3:49
10.	"Straumnes" (the name of a tidal headland near Fljótavík)		2:01
11.	"All Alright"		6:21
Total length:			55:36

Japanese and iTunes bonus track
No.	Title	Length
12.	"Heima" ("At home")	3:59
Total length:		59:35

== Personnel ==
- Jón Þór Birgisson – vocals, guitar
- Kjartan Sveinsson – keyboards
- Georg Hólm – bass guitar
- Orri Páll Dýrason – drums

Strings: Amiina (on tracks 2,3,4,5,8 and 9, recorded in Kjartan Sveinsson's livingroom and Langholtskirkja)

- Hildur Ársælsdóttir
- Edda Rún Ólafsdóttir
- Maria Huld Markan Sigfúsdóttir
- Sólrún Sumarliðadóttir

Brass (on tracks 2, 4 and 11) performed by:

- E. Friðfinnsson
- Helgi Hrafn Jónsson
- I.G. Erlendsson
- K. Håkonarson
- Samúel Jón Samúelsson
- S. Sigurðarson
- S.J. Bernharðsson

Tambourine, claps and other noises by Siggi Frendi, Höddi Gunni, John Best, Sunray and Breeze.

"Ára bátur" recorded live at Abbey Road Studios with the London Sinfonietta and the choristers of the London Oratory School Schola. Directed by D. Bjarnason, engineered by Andy Dudman.

Photography by Ryan McGinley.

== Charts ==
Chart performance for Með suð í eyrum við spilum endalaust
Chart (2008)	Peak position
Australian Albums (ARIA)	14
Austrian Albums (Ö3 Austria)	23
Belgian Albums (Ultratop Flanders)	4
Belgian Albums (Ultratop Wallonia)	25
Canadian Albums (Billboard)	11
Danish Albums (Hitlisten)	8
Dutch Albums (Album Top 100)	21
Finnish Albums (Suomen virallinen lista)	7
French Albums (SNEP)	30
German Albums (Offizielle Top 100)	26
Irish Albums (IRMA)	4
Japanese Albums (Oricon)	22
Italian Albums (FIMI)	11
New Zealand Albums (RMNZ)	29
Norwegian Albums (VG-lista)	7
Polish Albums (OLiS)	43
Portuguese Albums (AFP)	6
Spanish Albums (Promusicae)	79
Swedish Albums (Sverigetopplistan)	29
Swiss Albums (Schweizer Hitparade)	8
UK Albums (Official Charts)	5
US Billboard 200	15

== Certifications ==
Certifications for Með suð í eyrum við spilum endalaust
Region	Certification	Certified units/sales
Belgium (BRMA)	Gold	15,000^{*}
United Kingdom (BPI)	Gold	100,000^{^}
^{*} Sales figures based on certification alone.^{^} Shipments figures based on certification alone.
