= Ágætis byrjun =

Studio album by Sigur Rós
- Released: 12 June 1999
- Recorded: August 1998 – April 1999
- Studios: Numerous in Reykjavík, Iceland
- Genres: Post-rock; dream pop; ambient; chamber pop
- Length: 71:43
- Languages: Icelandic, Hopelandic
- Labels: Fat Cat; Smekkleysa
- Producer: Ken Thomas

Sigur Rós chronology
Von (1997)	Ágætis byrjun (1999)	( ) (2002)

Singles from Ágætis byrjun
- 1. "Svefn-g-englar" Released: 21 July 1999; 2. "Ný batterí" Released: 20 March 2000

Ágætis byrjun (Icelandic: [ˈaːucaitɪs ˈpɪrjʏn], A good beginning) is the second studio album by the Icelandic post-rock band Sigur Rós, released on 12 June 1999. The album was recorded between the summer of 1998 and the spring of 1999 with producer Ken Thomas. Ágætis byrjun represented a substantial departure from the band's previous album Von, with that album's extended ambient soundscapes replaced by Jónsi Birgisson's cello-bowed guitar work and orchestration, using a double string octet amongst other chamber elements.

The album was a commercial and critical breakthrough for the band. It received a 2000 release in the United Kingdom and a 2001 release in the United States. According to their label Smekkleysa, the album sold 10,000 copies on its first year of release in Iceland, earning the band platinum status. It won numerous awards, and has appeared on multiple critics' lists of the best albums of the 2000s.

Ágætis byrjun is the band's first album to feature keyboardist Kjartan Sveinsson, and their last to feature drummer Ágúst Ævar Gunnarsson, who left the band several months after the album was released. Gunnarsson was replaced by Orri Páll Dýrason in the same year.

== Composition ==
Logo on the album cover in the font ShelleyAllegro BT

The ten songs on the album include some self-reference; the introduction contains backmasked sections of the title track, and the last song, "Avalon", consists of a different take of an instrumental passage from "Starálfur" slowed to around a quarter of its original speed. The string parts on "Starálfur" are palindromic; they are the same forwards and backwards.

All vocals are sung in Icelandic, except for those on "Olsen Olsen" and the last section of the title track, which are sung in the gibberish language Vonlenska. Sigur Rós' subsequent album, ( ), used Vonlenska exclusively for its vocals.

The album has been described as "cosmic", "other-worldly" and "timeless" due to the unique sound of the band's music.

== Packaging ==
The album's title came from a friend hearing the first song they had written for the album, which would become the title track. After hearing the song, he said it was "a good beginning"; the name stuck. The title has also been translated as "An alright start."

The sketch of a human foetus on the cover was drawn by Gotti Bernhöft with a Bic Cristal ballpoint pen. The booklet cover for the CD edition of the album features the line: "Ég gaf ykkur von sem varð að vonbrigðum... þetta er ágætis byrjun" which translates to "I gave you (plural) hope that became a disappointment... this is a good beginning". This line is a reference to their two previous releases, Von and Von brigði.

Sigur Rós assembled and glued together the cases of the first print of Ágætis byrjun themselves. As a result, many of the CDs were unusable due to glue stains.

== Reception ==
Professional ratings
Aggregate scores
Source	Rating
Metacritic	87/100
Review scores
Source	Rating
AllMusic	5/5 stars
The Austin Chronicle	5/5 stars
The Boston Phoenix	3.5/4 stars
The Guardian	3/5 stars
NME	7/10
Pitchfork	9.4/10
Q	4/5 stars
Rolling Stone	4/5 stars
Spin	8/10
The Village Voice	B

While released to little fanfare, the album quickly gained radio exposure in Iceland, and spent the autumn of 1999 climbing the Icelandic album charts, finally resting at the top for a number of weeks. After surprising success in Iceland, the album subsequently gained strong international buzz with numerous articles in many prominent publications, hype from internet message boards and blogs, as well as often exuberant critical praise. Ágætis byrjun was released in the United Kingdom in 2000, and in the North American market in 2001 by Fat Cat Records. In 2001, Ágætis byrjun won the inaugural Shortlist Music Prize.

An acclaimed music video was made for "Viðrar vel til loftárása". The album's tracks have also been featured in soundtracks; "Starálfur" was used in The Life Aquatic with Steve Zissou and the Emmy winning 2005 TV film The Girl in the Café. "Svefn-g-englar" was used in Vanilla Sky, amongst others. The song "Flugufrelsarinn" has been arranged by Stephen Prustman for the Kronos Quartet, and is available on their download-only release Kronos Quartet Plays Sigur Rós.

Pitchfork ranked Ágætis byrjun at number two on their list of the best albums of 2000 (behind Kid A by Radiohead), and at number eight on their list of the top 200 albums of the 2000s.

In December 2009, Rolling Stone ranked Ágætis byrjun the 29th best album of the 2000s.

In the Q and Mojo Classic Special Edition "Pink Floyd & The Story of Prog Rock", the album placed at number 27 in its list of "40 Cosmic Rock Albums".

The album was also included in the book 1001 Albums You Must Hear Before You Die.

It was announced in 2009 that a deluxe edition would be released to mark the 10th anniversary of Ágætis byrjun's international release. It was slated for release in early summer 2015. It was to feature previously unheard studio and live recordings as well as photographic and documentary material from the band's personal archives.

Ágætis byrjun peaked at No. 24 on Billboard's Top Independent Albums chart in January and as of 2008 it has sold 227,000 copies in the US, according to Nielsen SoundScan. In Europe it was upgraded to Platinum by Impala award for 400,000+ copies sold up to 2012.

"Olsen Olsen" was used in The Simpsons episode "The Saga of Carl" broadcast May 19, 2013.

== Track listing ==
No.	Title	Translated title	Length
1.	"Intro" ( (Note: The album's packaging leaves the first track untitled, though the band's website gives the piece the name "Intro".))		1:36
2.	"Svefn-g-englar" ( (Note: The title of the song refers to an Icelandic pun that combines "svefn" (sleep) and "englar" (angels), with an additional nod to "göngusvefn" (sleepwalking).))	Sleepwalking Angels	10:03
3.	"Starálfur"	Staring Elf	6:45
4.	"Flugufrelsarinn"	Savior of the Fly	7:47
5.	"Ný batterí"	New Batteries	8:09
6.	"Hjartað hamast (bamm bamm bamm)"	The Heart Pounds (Bam Bam Bam)	7:09
7.	"Viðrar vel til loftárása"	Good Weather for Airstrikes	10:16
8.	"Olsen Olsen"		8:02
9.	"Ágætis byrjun"	A Good Beginning	7:55
10.	"Avalon"		4:01
Total length:			71:43

=== 20th Anniversary Deluxe Edition ===
On July 5, 2019, the band released an anniversary edition of the album as a 4-CD box set, and as a limited-edition, 7-vinyl-album set. It features early versions and demos of the songs on the record, and unreleased songs, pulled together from the band's personal archive, as well as The Icelandic Opera (Íslenska Óperan) June 12, 1999, concert, recorded for the Icelandic radio.

CD2: Live at Íslenska Óperan, 1999
No.	Title	Additional information	Length
1.	"Intro" (Live at Íslenska Óperan, 1999)	Performed by Amiina	5:05
2.	"Von" (Live at Íslenska Óperan, 1999)	Original version on Von, 1997	7:44
3.	"Syndir guðs" (Live at Íslenska Óperan, 1999)	Previously on "Svefn-g-englar" single Original version on Von, 1997	5:29
4.	"Flugufrelsarinn" (Live at Íslenska Óperan, 1999)		9:07
5.	"Olsen Olsen" (Live at Íslenska Óperan, 1999)		6:07
6.	"Ágætis byrjun" (Live at Íslenska Óperan, 1999)		7:33
7.	"Viðrar vel til loftárása" (Live at Íslenska Óperan, 1999)		8:32
8.	"Svefn-g-englar" (Live at Íslenska Óperan, 1999)		9:26
Total length:			59:03

CD3: Live at Íslenska Óperan plus Rarities
No.	Title	Additional information	Length
1.	"Ný batterí" (Live at Íslenska Óperan, 1999)		5:58
2.	"Nýja lagið" (Live at Íslenska Óperan, 1999)	Previously on "Svefn-g-englar" single	9:48
3.	"Hafsól" (Live at Íslenska Óperan, 1999)		15:21
4.	"Hugmynd 1" (Demo)		6:58
5.	"Hugmynd 2" (Demo)		4:02
6.	"Hugmynd 3" (Demo)		9:50
7.	"Debata mandire" (Live at Laugardashöll, 1999)		3:48
8.	"Rafmagnið búið"	From Ný batterí EP, 2000; originally credited as "performed by the SS brass band."	6:00
Total length:			61:45

CD4: Rarities
No.	Title	Length
1.	"Svefn-g-englar" (Live at Popp í Reykjavík, 1998)	11:50
2.	"Starálfur" (Original Speed Version)	6:26
3.	"Flugufrelsarinn" (1998 demo)	8:47
4.	"Ný batteri" (First Mix)	7:06
5.	"Hjartað hamast (bamm bamm bamm)" (1995 demo)	9:16
6.	"Viðrar vel til loftárása" (Alternative Ending)	11:04
7.	"Olsen olsen" (1998 demo)	7:26
8.	"Ágætis byrjun" (1998 demo)	8:02
Total length:		69:57

== Personnel ==
- Jón Þór Birgisson – vocals, electric guitar, acoustic guitar
- Kjartan Sveinsson – keyboards
- Georg Hólm – bass guitar
- Ágúst Ævar Gunnarsson – drums

== Charts ==
=== Weekly charts ===
Weekly chart performance for Ágætis byrjun
Chart (2019)	Peak position
Belgian Albums (Ultratop Flanders)	114
Belgian Albums (Ultratop Wallonia)	138
French Albums (SNEP)	114
German Albums (Offizielle Top 100)	59
Scottish Albums (Official Charts)	18
Spanish Albums (PROMUSICAE)	99
Swiss Albums (Schweizer Hitparade)	80

=== Year-end charts ===
2016 year-end chart performance for Ágætis byrjun
Chart (2016)	Position
Icelandic Albums (Plötutíóindi)	59

== Certifications and sales ==
Region	Certification	Certified units/sales
Iceland (FHF)	Platinum	19,500
United Kingdom (BPI)	Gold	100,000^{^}
United States	—	227,000
Summaries
Europe	—	400,000
^{^} Shipments figures based on certification alone.

== Release history ==
Country	Date	Label	Format	Catalogue	Notes
Iceland	June 1999	Smekkleysa	CD	SM79CD	
United Kingdom	11 August 2000	Fat Cat	2LP	FATLP11	
United Kingdom	11 August 2000	Fat Cat	CD	FATCD11	
United States	22 May 2001	PIAS	CD	PIASA 01-02	
United Kingdom	9 March 2009	Fat Cat	2LP	FATLP11X	180g vinyl, DMM
