= Glósóli =

Single by Sigur Rós

from the album Takk...
- Released: 15 August 2005
- Genre: Post-rock; shoegaze; space rock
- Length: 6:15
- Songwriters: Jón Þór Birgisson; Orri Páll Dýrason; Georg Hólm; Kjartan Sveinsson
- Producers: Sigur Rós; Ken Thomas

Sigur Rós singles chronology
"Vaka" (2003)	"Glósóli" (2005)	"Sæglópur" (2005)

Music video
- "Glósóli" on YouTube

"Glósóli" ([ˈkl̥ou̯ːˌsou̯lɪ], Icelandic for "Glowing Sole" is a song by Sigur Rós, released as part of their 2005 album Takk... Together with "Sæglópur" it was the first single released from the album, available as a download only release on iTunes in America and Europe respectively.

The name is a combination of gló- from the verb að glóa meaning "to glow, shine, glitter" and sóli meaning "sole." The second element of the name, sóli, shares its grammatical stem with the word "sól", meaning "sun". In combination "glósóli" can be understood as a childish way of saying "glowing sun" or "let the sun glow".

== Music video ==
The song is also praised for its artistic and highly cinematographic music video. The video consists of children dressed in old-fashioned Icelandic clothing, migrating towards a very characteristic cliff which is to be found in Reykjanes Peninsula in the SW of Iceland (63°48'39.6"N 22°42'49.7"W). The leader, a boy with a drum, directs the group through a land characterized by open fields and rocky hills, all the while picking up more and more children. The group then fall asleep and the video enters a dream-like state, signified by a change in hue. The song culminates at the end when the children reach a large hill and the leader starts beating his drum rapidly. When the song climaxes, the children start to run full speed up the hill. The upward slope of this hill in fact matches the upward curve of the song's constantly increasing dynamic structure when viewed as a waveform. It is then shown that the hill is in fact a cliff, ending at the ocean. When the children reach the edge, they jump off and swim through the air. The video features a characteristic ambiguous ending, when the last and youngest child is shown jumping off the cliff in a cannonball style. The cinematographer Chris Soos has stated that to him the child definitely flies along with the rest, but ambiguity was the intention. The child naturally chose the cannonball style after a reluctance to jump whilst filming. The video is also a direct allusion to J. D. Salinger's novel The Catcher in the Rye. In the novel, character Holden Caulfield says "I have to catch everybody if they start to go over the cliff - I mean if they're running and they don't look where they're going I have to come out from somewhere and catch them. That's all I do all day. I'd just be the catcher in the rye and all." The video was directed by Arni & Kinski.

== Film ==
The song is used under license in the closing scenes of the documentary film Drawn From Water, highlighting the plight of Ethiopian mingi orphans. It was also used as the closing music for Roving Mars, a 2006 film about the Mars Exploration Rovers.

== Personnel ==
- Jón Þór Birgisson – vocals, guitar
- Kjartan Sveinsson – keyboard
- Georg Hólm – bass
- Orri Páll Dýrason – drums

== Orchestral version ==
- BBC Concert Orchestra performed in concerts a version of "Glósóli" for orchestra and optional chorus arranged by composer Fung Lam as part of their education projects in 2006 and 2009.

== Cover versions ==
Sarah Brightman recorded an English version of this song for her 2013 album, Dreamchaser.
