= Von (album) =

Studio album by Sigur Rós
- Released: 14 June 1997
- Genre: Post-rock; avant-garde; drone; dark ambient
- Length: 71:59
- Label: Smekkleysa

Sigur Rós chronology
Von (1997)	Ágætis byrjun (1999)

Professional ratings
Aggregate scores
Source	Rating
Metacritic	68/100
Review scores
Source	Rating
AllMusic	3.5/5 stars
Blender	2/5 stars
Drowned in Sound	8/10
musicOMH	4/5 stars
Pitchfork	7.8/10
Rock Sound	6/10
Under the Radar	4/10

Von (Icelandic pronunciation: [ˈvɔːn], Hope) is the debut studio album by Icelandic post-rock band Sigur Rós, released on 14 June 1997 by Smekkleysa Records. Production lasted over two years, and the result sounded significantly different from the original recordings. The band considered scrapping the final result, but decided not as it would have made the process too long. In exchange for recording time, Sigur Rós painted the studio they recorded in.

Von was originally released in Iceland to positive reviews from critics, but went relatively unnoticed abroad. In the first year following its release, Von sold only 313 copies in Iceland. Following the band's popular international releases Ágætis byrjun and ( ), it was re-released in the United Kingdom in 2004, and in the United States a month later. In 2005, Von and Ágætis byrjun were declared platinum albums in Iceland, signifying domestic sales of over 5,000.

== Composition ==
The sixth track consists of 18 seconds of silence, and gave name to Sigur Rós's official website, 'eighteen seconds before sunrise'. The last track starts with six minutes and fifteen seconds of silence, then consists of a portion of "Myrkur" played backwards, hence the name of "Rukrym."

The tracks "Hafssól" and "Von" were later re-recorded with different arrangements, the former released as a B-side to the Hoppípolla single and both appearing on 2007's Hvarf/Heim.

== Artwork ==
The cover depicts Jónsi's sister Inga Birgisdóttir as a baby.

== Track listing ==
No.	Title	English translation	Length
1.	"Sigur Rós"	Victory Rose	9:46
2.	"Dögun"	Dawn	5:50
3.	"Hún Jörð ..."	Mother Earth ...	7:17
4.	"Leit að lífi"	Search for Life	2:33
5.	"Myrkur"	Darkness	6:14
6.	"18 sekúndur fyrir sólarupprás"	18 Seconds before Sunrise	0:18
7.	"Hafssól"	The Sea's Sun	12:24
8.	"Veröld ný og óð"	A World, New and Crazed	3:29
9.	"Von"	Hope	5:12
10.	"Mistur"	Mist	2:16
11.	"Syndir Guðs (Opinberun frelsarans)"	Sins of God (Revelation of the Savior)	7:40
12.	"Rukrym"	Ssenkrad	8:59
Total length:			71:58

== Personnel ==
- Jón Þór Birgisson – vocals, guitar
- Georg Hólm – bass
- Ágúst Ævar Gunnarsson – drums
