= Heima =

- Heima cover
- Directed by: Dean DeBlois
- Produced by: John Best; Dean O'Connor; Finni Jóhansson
- Starring: Jón Þór Birgisson; Georg Hólm; Kjartan Sveinsson; Orri Páll Dýrason; Hildur Ársælsdóttir; María Huld Markan Sigfúsdóttir; Edda Rún Ólafsdóttir; Sólrún Sumarliðadóttir
- Cinematography: Alan Calzatti
- Release date: 27 September 2007 (Iceland)
- Running time: 94 min.
- Country: Iceland
- Languages: English; Icelandic

Heima (Icelandic pronunciation: [ˈheiːma]; at home) is a documentary film and double DVD set about the tour around Iceland in the summer of 2006 of the band Sigur Rós. During the tour the band played two big open-air concerts at Miklatún - Reykjavík (30 July) and Ásbyrgi (4 August), as well as small scale concerts at Ólafsvík (24 July), Ísafjörður (26 July), Djúpavík (27 July), Háls, Öxnadalur (28 July) and Seyðisfjörður (3 August). In addition, a protest concert against the Kárahnjúkar dam was performed at Snæfellsskála (3 August). The documentary also includes footage of an acoustic concert played for family and friends at Gamla Borg, a coffee shop in the small town Borg, on 22 April 2007.

The documentary premiered in Iceland at the Reykjavík International Film Festival opening day, 27 September 2007. Heima was released 5 November 2007 (4 December in North America) in two editions, one including atmospheric photos in a photobook documenting the tour. In December 2007, American webzine Somewhere Cold voted Heima DVD of the Year on their 2007 Somewhere Cold Awards Hall of Fame.

The DVD has sold 5,000 copies in Canada earning it a Gold Award under the Video Certifications. And it was certified Platinum for 100,000 copies in America.

On May 27, 2011 the band released an official HD-quality version of Heima on their website, available as digital download in QuickTime format.

== Track listing ==
The first DVD contains the documentary, with optional audio commentary from the band's manager, while the second DVD features full-length versions of the songs.

=== DVD 1 ===
1. "Titles/Intro"
2. "Glósóli"
3. "Sé lest"
4. "Ágætis byrjun"
5. "Heysátan"
6. "Olsen Olsen"
7. "Von"
8. "Gítardjamm"
9. "Vaka"
10. "Á ferð til Breiðafjarðar vorið 1922" (with Steindór Andersen)
11. "Starálfur"
12. "Hoppípolla"
13. "Popplagið"
14. "Samskeyti" (and Credits)

=== DVD 2 ===
1. "Glósóli" – 9:15
2. "Memories of melodies"
3. "Heysátan" – 5:05
4. "Sé lest" – 11:26
5. "Gítardjamm" – 5:29
6. "Olsen Olsen" – 8:21
7. "Popplagið" – 15:44
8. "Á Húsafelli"
9. "Surtshellir" – 3:32
10. "Church" – 0:40
11. "Museum"
12. "Ágætis byrjun" – 6:55
13. "Þorrablót"
14. "Kvæðamannafélagið Iðunn"
15. "Á ferð til Breiðafjarðar vorið 1922" (with Steindór Andersen) – 6:00
16. "Vaka" (Snæfell) – 5:50
17. "Dauðalagið" – 13:08
18. "Hoppípolla"/"Með blóðnasir" – 7:12
19. "Starálfur" – 5:39
20. "Vaka" (Álafoss) – 5:21
21. "Heima" – 3:30
22. "Von" – 8:27
23. "Samskeyti" – 5:19
24. "Tour diary"
25. "Credits"
