= Sigur Rós =

Icelandic post-rock band

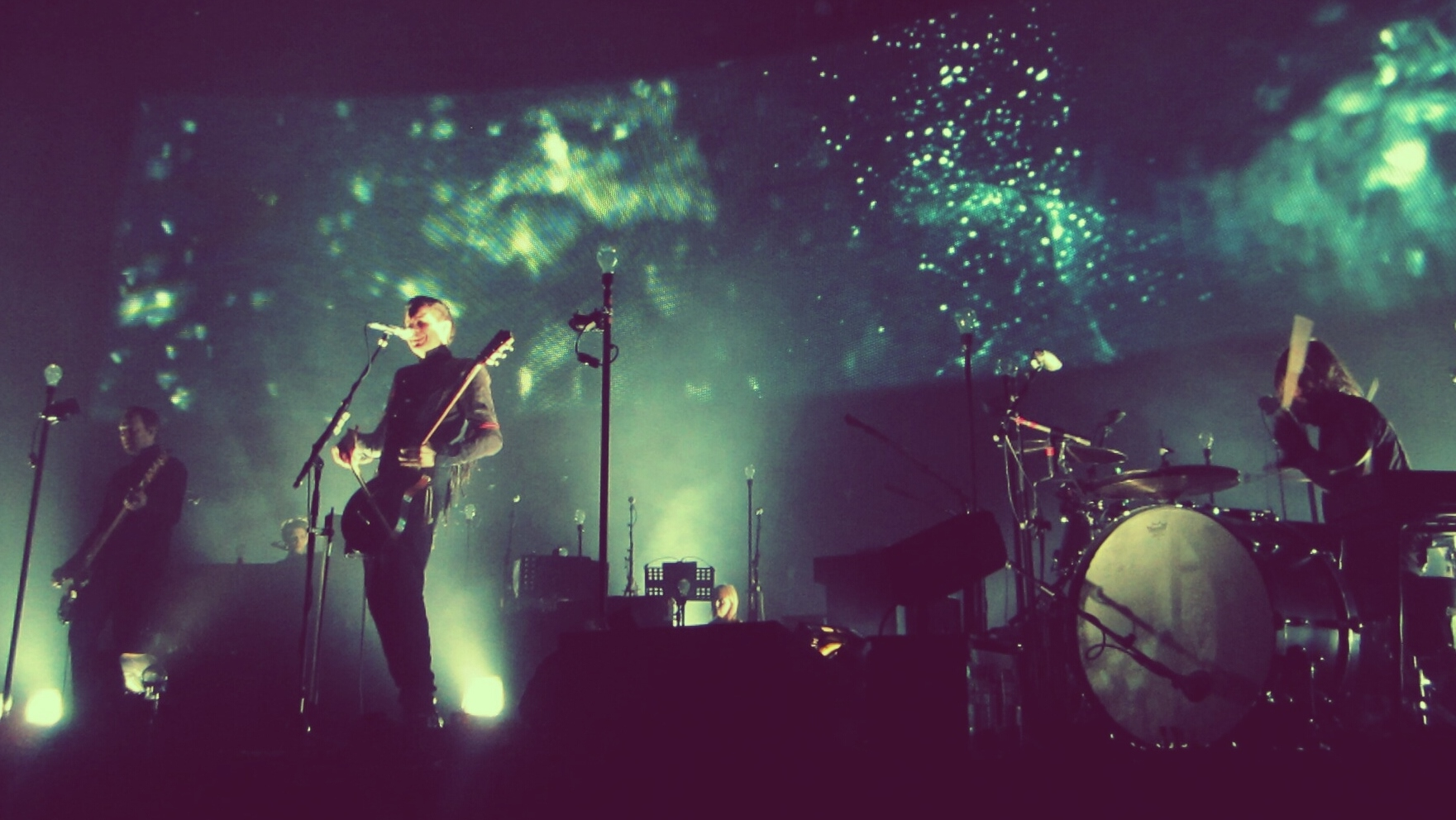
- Sigur Rós performing in 2013. From left to right: Georg, Jónsi and Orri

Background information
- Origin: Reykjavík, Iceland
- Genres: Post-rock; art rock; dream pop; ambient
- Years active: 1994–present
- Labels: FatCat; Geffen; EMI; XL; Smekkleysa; Parlophone; Krunk Records
- Spinoffs: Jónsi & Alex
- Members: Jónsi Birgisson; Georg Hólm; Kjartan Sveinsson
- Past members: Ágúst Ævar Gunnarsson; Orri Páll Dýrason
- Website: https://sigurros.com

Sigur Rós (Icelandic pronunciation: [ˈsɪːɣʏrous] see-uhr-rohs) is an Icelandic post-rock band that formed in 1994 in Reykjavík. It comprises lead vocalist and guitarist Jón Þór "Jónsi" Birgisson, bassist Georg Hólm, and keyboardist Kjartan Sveinsson. Known for their ethereal sound, frontman Jónsi's falsetto vocals, and their use of bowed guitar, Sigur Rós incorporate classical and minimal aesthetic elements. Jónsi's vocals are sung in Icelandic and non-linguistic vocalisations the band terms Vonlenska. They have released eight studio albums, and attracted critical and commercial attention with their second album Ágætis byrjun (1999).

== History ==
=== 1997–1998: Von and Von brigði ===
Jón Þór "Jónsi" Birgisson (guitar and vocals), Georg Hólm (bass) and Ágúst Ævar Gunnarsson (drums) formed Sigur Rós in Reykjavík in January 1994. The band's name, which means 'Victory Rose', is taken from the name of Jónsi's younger sister, Sigurrós, born a few days before the band was formed.

Sigur Rós signed a record deal with the Icelandic Sugarcubes-owned record label Bad Taste, because they thought the falsetto vocals would appeal to teenage girls. In 1997, they released Von and in 1998 a remix collection, Von brigði. The band was joined by Kjartan Sveinsson on keyboards in 1998. He is the only member of Sigur Rós with musical training, and contributed most of the orchestral and string arrangements for their later work.

=== 1999–2001: Ágætis byrjun ===
International acclaim came with 1999's Ágætis byrjun. The album's reputation spread by word of mouth over the following two years. Soon critics worldwide were praising it effusively, and the band drew praise from high-profile acts such as Radiohead, Coldplay and David Bowie.

Three songs, "Ágætis byrjun", "Svefn-g-englar", and a live take, from a 2000 concert in Denmark, of the then-unreleased "Njósnavélin" (later 'unnamed' "Untitled #4") appeared in the Cameron Crowe film Vanilla Sky. The former two also subsequently appeared in the US version of the television series Queer as Folk. Their music has also appeared in the TV series 24 with "Ný batterí", and CSI with "Svefn-g-englar". In 2004, Wes Anderson used "Starálfur" in The Life Aquatic with Steve Zissou as did the Emmy-winning 2005 TV film The Girl in the Café. In Enki Bilal's Immortel (Ad Vitam) the song "Hjartað hamast (bamm bamm bamm)" is used. The song "Svefn-g-englar" was also used on V on 24 November 2009, and features prominently in Café de Flore released in 2011.

After the release of Ágætis byrjun, the band became known for Jónsi's signature style of reverb accentuated guitar work using a cello's bow.

=== 2001–2004: ( ) ===
In 2001, Sigur Rós christened their newly completed studio by recording an EP titled Rímur with an Icelandic fisherman named Steindór Andersen. The EP contains six songs, all of which feature Steindór Andersen reciting traditional Icelandic rímur poetry. Sigur Rós accompany him on three songs. Two songs feature Steindór alone. The last song on the EP, "Lækurinn", is a duet with Sigurður Sigurðarson. A thousand copies of the EP were printed and sold during the spring tour of 2001. The EP was sold in a blank-white-paper case. In 2001 the band toured in Canada, performing at Massey Hall in Toronto in September.

Drummer Ágúst left the band after the recording of Ágætis byrjun and was replaced by Orri Páll Dýrason. In 2002, their highly anticipated follow-up album ( ) was released. Upon release all tracks on the album were untitled, though the band later published song names on their website. All of the lyrics on ( ) are sung in Vonlenska, also known as Hopelandic, a language without semantic meaning, which resembles the phonology of the Icelandic language. It has also been said that the listener is supposed to interpret their own meanings of the lyrics which can then be written in the blank pages in the album booklet.

In 2002, the band also wrote an original score for the Bodyscript dance production by Wayne McGregor Random Dance in collaboration with Sadler's Wells Theatre and the Arts Council England.

In October 2003, Sigur Rós and Radiohead both composed music for Merce Cunningham's dance piece Split Sides; Sigur Rós's three tracks were released on the March 2004 EP Ba Ba Ti Ki Di Do. Radiohead's contribution was not commercially released. Sigur Rós' 1997 debut album, Von, found a US and UK release in October 2004.

"Untitled 3" (a.k.a. "Samskeyti") from the album is used on the video 6AM by film maker Carmen Vidal, winner of the 2006 Student Academy Award. "Untitled 3" is also used at the end credits of the indie drama movie, Mysterious Skin. It can also be heard in Skins and CSI: Miami and the British TV Documentary Protecting Our Children as well as during a section of the London 2012 summer Olympics on the BBC. It can also be heard in the climactic scene of Eurovision Song Contest: The Story of Fire Saga on Netflix. "Untitled 4" from the album (also called "Njósnavélin") featured in the final scene of Vanilla Sky, and director Cameron Crowe commented: "We struggled to find an appropriate track to end the film with and then I went to see Sigur Rós perform in Los Angeles and they played this song, 'Njósnavélin', that was just perfect. I had to have it." This track is also featured on Canadian TV series Orphan Black in episode 10 of season 3.

=== 2005–2006: Takk... ===
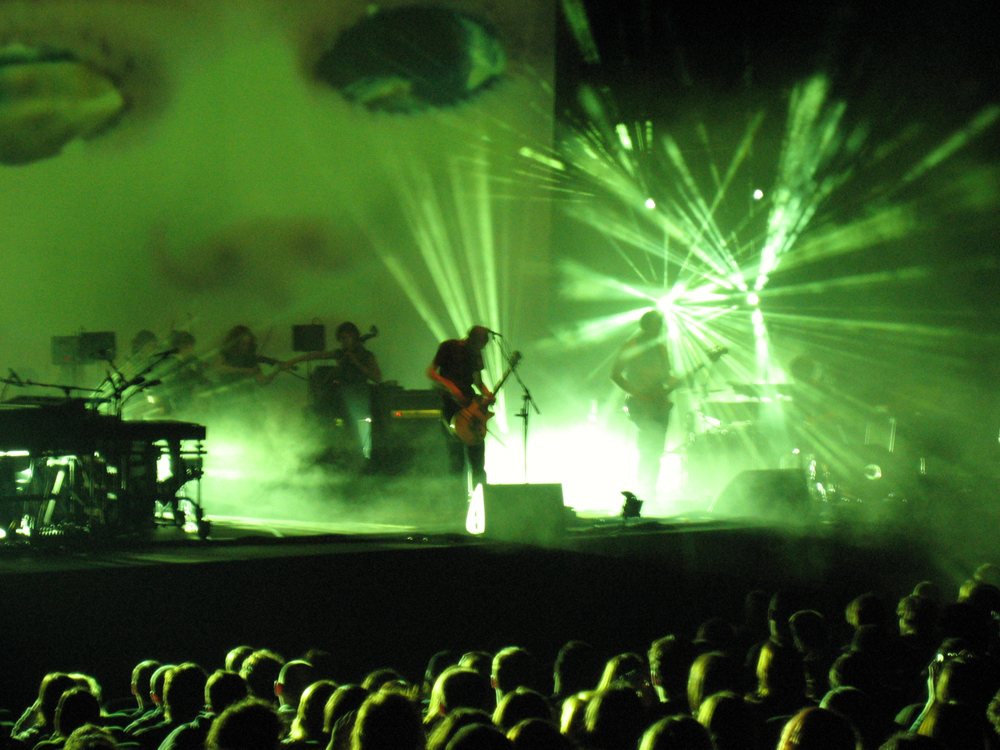
Sigur Rós performing in Barcelona, 2005

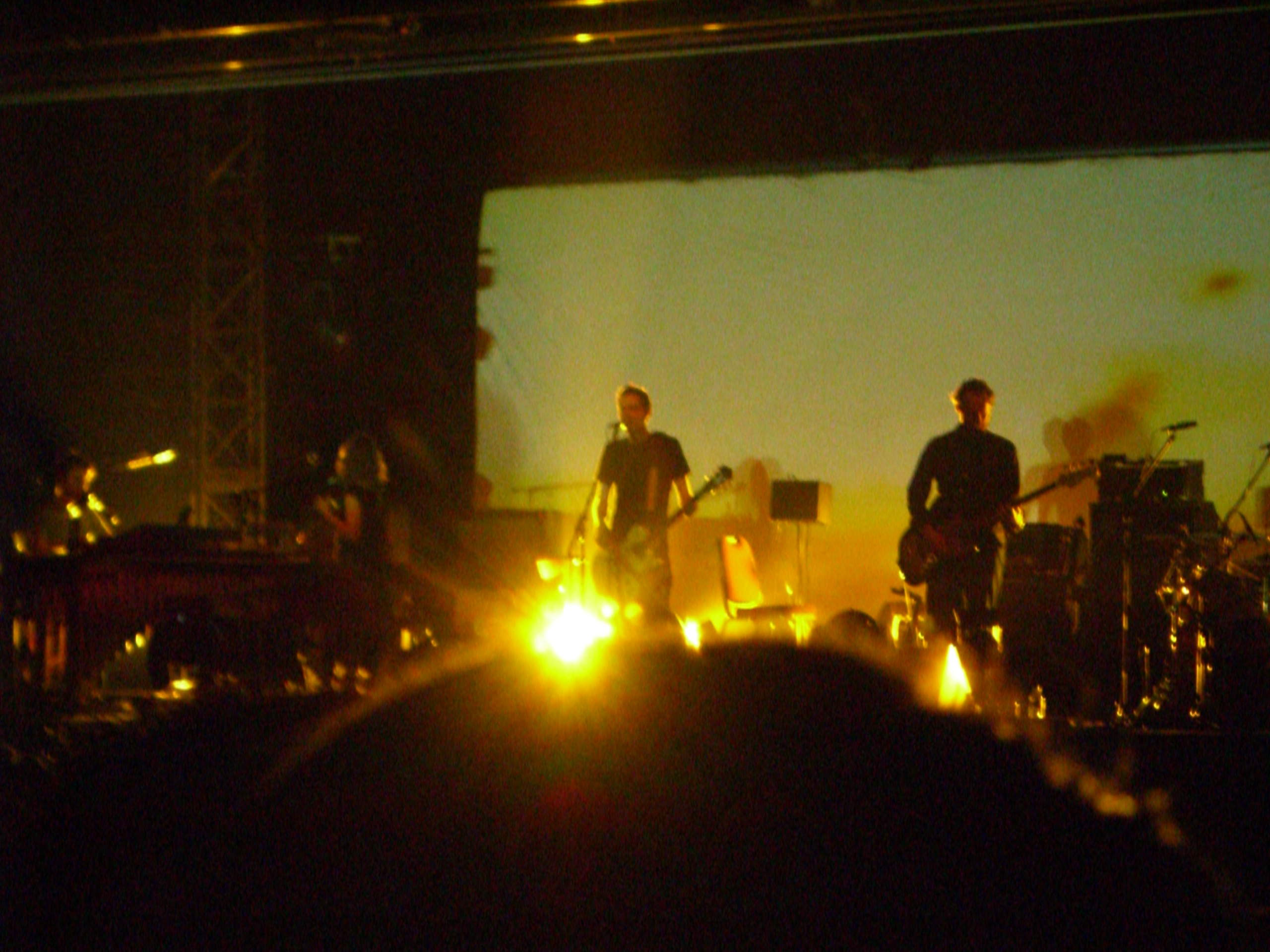
Sigur Rós performing in Hong Kong on 7 April 2006

Their fourth album, Takk... employs the distinctive sound of their second album in a more rock oriented structure with greater use of the guitar, and was released in September 2005. "Hoppípolla", the second official single from Takk..., was released in November alongside a new studio remake of "Hafsól", a song that was previously released on the band's 1997 debut, Von. "Hoppípolla" was used in the trailers for the BBC's natural history series Planet Earth in 2006, as well as the closing credits for the 2006 FA Cup final, ITV's coverage of the 2006 Oxford and Cambridge Boat Race, advertisements for the BBC's coverage of England games during the 2006 FIFA World Cup, on television advertisements for RTÉ's Gaelic games coverage in Ireland, and on an advertisement for Oxfam. It was also used in the final scene of the movie Penelope, for the trailer of the film Children of Men and for the trailer of the film Slumdog Millionaire. Following this, demand for the single grew. It was made more widely available by EMI in consequence. This song was also used in the trailer for the Disney movie Earth as well as in the 2011 film We Bought a Zoo. Whilst it does not appear on the film's soundtrack album, it is also featured in Eurovision Song Contest: The Story Of Fire Saga.

An extended Sæglópur EP was released in July 2006 in most parts of the world and in August in the United States. Its original release was scheduled in May, but because of the sudden demand of "Hoppípolla" it was pushed back from that date. Sigur Rós recorded three new songs to appear on the EP ("Refur", "Ó friður", and "Kafari"). In July 2006, Sigur Rós finished a major world tour with stops in Europe, the United States (where they played a headline show at the Hollywood Bowl), Canada, Australia, New Zealand, Hong Kong and Japan. Upon return to their homeland, Sigur Rós provided a series of free surprise outdoor concerts throughout Iceland in July and August, playing in various venues such as abandoned bunkers and community coffee shops, all of which were included in the 2007 documentary film Heima. They also performed twice in the United States in February.

=== 2007: Heima and Hvarf/Heim ===
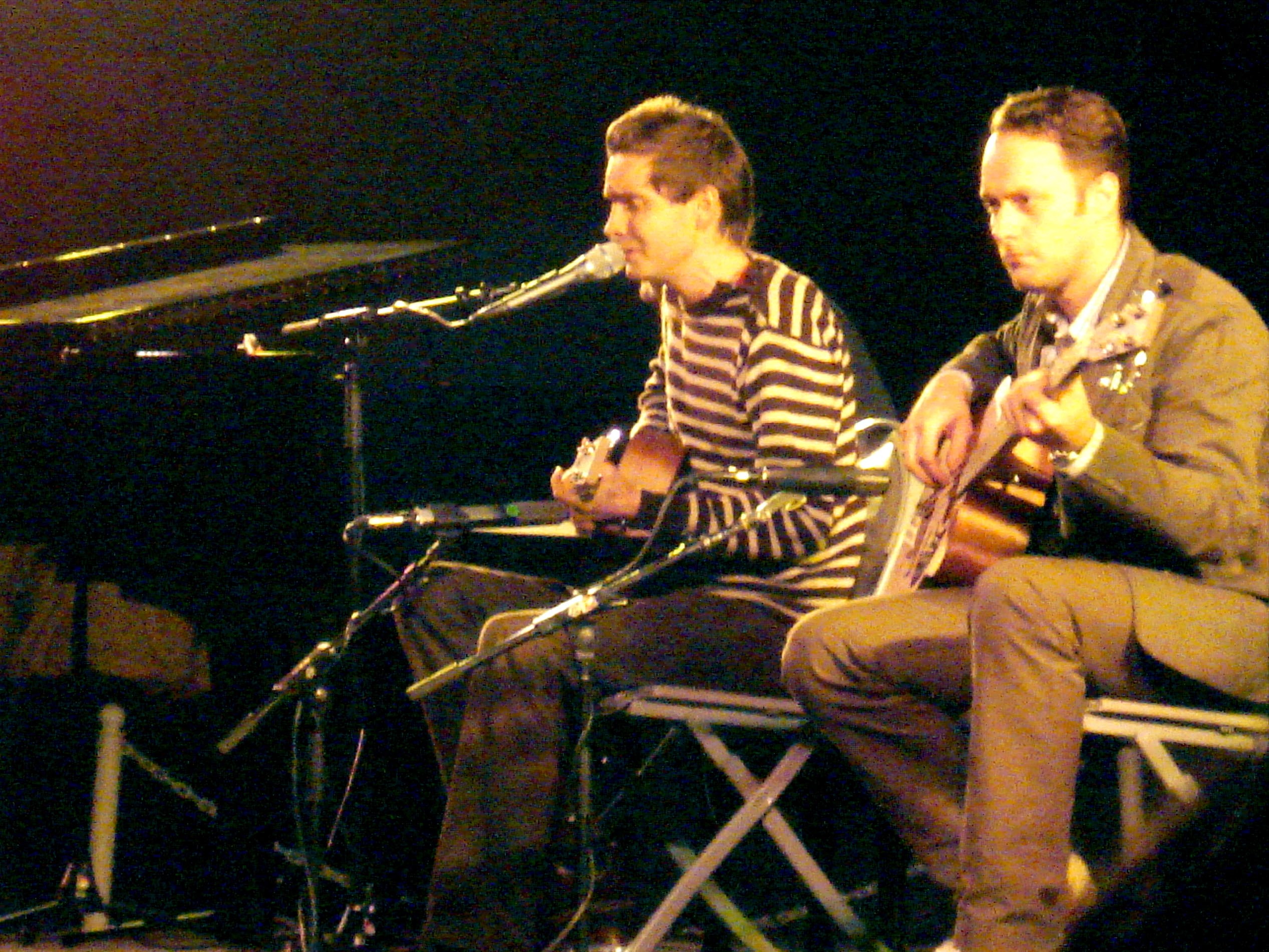
At UCLA in 2008, playing an acoustic set before screening Heima

In August 2007, a limited DVD+CD edition of the 2002 soundtrack to the documentary Hlemmur was released. Hvarf/Heim was released on 5 November (6 November in the U.S.), a double compilation album containing studio versions of previously unreleased songs — "Salka", "Hljómalind" (formerly known as "Rokklagið"), "Í Gær" and "Von" on Hvarf, and acoustic studio versions of the songs: "Samskeyti", "Starálfur", "Vaka", "Ágætis Byrjun", "Heysátan" and "Von", on Heim. On the same day (20 November in the U.S.) Heima, a live DVD of the previous summer's Iceland tour, was released. Just prior to the release of Hvarf/Heim, on 29 October, a single named "Hljómalind" was released.

The 2007 feature-length documentary from Sigur Rós's summer tour in Iceland, which occurred in 2006, attempts to shed light on the band's homeland. Therefore, the film is called Heima, which means 'at home'. In the movie, the band members express their interpretation of Iceland. The film revolves around three main elements; the band playing live, the Icelandic nature shaping their music, along with interviews, where they tell the viewers what it was like to play at home in addition to sharing their overall experience of the tour.

To promote their film Heima, the band scheduled a series of premiere screenings throughout the world, featuring a short acoustic set before the film and a question-and-answer session afterwards.

=== 2008: Með suð í eyrum við spilum endalaust ===
Sigur Rós's fifth regular studio album, Með suð í eyrum við spilum endalaust, was released in June 2008 to generally positive reviews. Stylistically different from their earlier releases, it featured fewer strings and more guitar, and had more pop-oriented songs, making it "the group's most accessible effort" while maintaining the "majestic beauty that defines the band's music." The final track "All Alright" is the band's first to be sung in English, though all the other lyrics are in Icelandic.

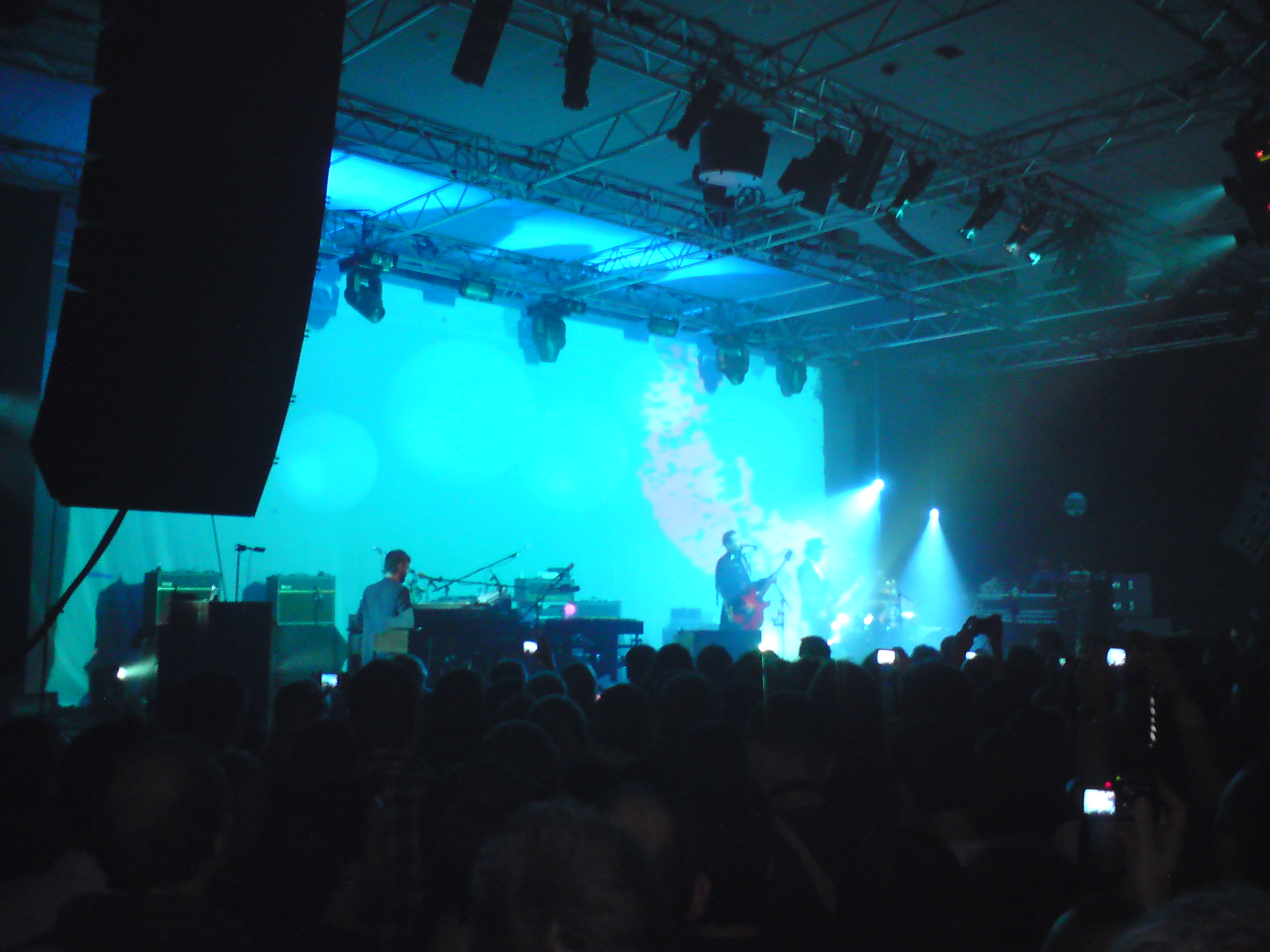
Sigur Rós performing in Bournemouth, United Kingdom, 2008

The band were announced as a headlining act for the 2008 Splendour in the Grass Festival in Byron Bay, Australia, Latitude Festival 2008, and the 2008 La Route du Rock Festival in St Malo, France. In addition, the band performed a late-night set at the 2008 Bonnaroo Music Festival in Manchester, Tennessee, where they blew a speaker at the end of their second song. Jónsi Birgisson commented, "The piano is exploding, I think," one of the few things spoken in English.

The band released the first song from the album titled "Gobbledigook" for free on their website, along with a music video.

On 8 June, the whole album was made available for free streaming on their website.

In autumn 2008 Sigur Rós embarked on a world tour supporting their newly released album. The band played as a four-piece without Amiina and the brass band, the first time the band had played as a four-piece in seven years. The tour started on 17 September 2008 in the United States, at the United Palace Theater in New York City, and finished with a concert in Reykjavík at Laugardalshöll on 23 November 2008. The majority of the tour was European with the exception of concerts in the United States, Australia, Canada and Japan.

The track "Festival" from the album features in the score of the 2010 film 127 Hours, providing the euphoric backing to the climax of the movie. It is also featured at the end of HBO mini-series "24/7 – Flyers-Rangers".

The track "Untitled #7 (Dauðalagið)" was also featured in the launch trailer for Dead Space.

=== 2009–2012: Hiatus, Inni, Valtari ===
In 2009, Jónsi embarked on a solo adventure with his first solo album, Go, released the next year.

On 28 May 2009, Sigur Rós announced that they had almost completed recording their latest album. The band said the album was taking form as a slower and more ambient record than both Með suð í eyrum við spilum endalaust and Takk.... The music was also described as melodic but much less noisy and more "out there" than previous albums. The unnamed album was expected to be released sometime in 2010. However, the band later revealed that the recordings had been scrapped. In a 2010 interview, Jónsi confirmed "We haven't got another album ready", he said. "It was just a rumour. We started to record something, but then we chucked it all away. So I think we are going to have to start it all again". Without further word on the new album, Sigur Rós were rumoured to be on indefinite hiatus as of January 2010. However, before taking the stage at Coachella in April 2010, Jónsi commented that Sigur Rós would be getting back to work that year: "I'm gonna record some other stuff with Sigur Rós when I'm home", between a series of shows during his solo tour in summer 2010. On 1 February 2011, Jónsi's official website announced that he would be back in the studio with the band over the spring.

On 11 August 2011 Sigur Rós's official website unveiled a trailer for a project called Inní, a DVD and double CD of the band's live performances in London, directed by Vincent Morisset. It was screened at the 68th Venice International Film Festival, and saw official release in November 2011. On 16 September 2011, the Inni album and live video became available to pre-order from the band's site in a variety of formats. Additionally, the band made the video for the song "Festival" available to watch online, as well as offering a free download of the audio from a live performance of the song.

On 3 November 2011, following the UK premiere of Inni at the British Film Institute in London, the band members participated in a Q&A session during which Georg promised that 2012 would be a "very busy" year for Sigur Rós. The band hinted at a new album and tour in the second half of 2012. The Q&A session was curtailed when a stage light began to emit smoke and the room was evacuated.

"The band's next album is scheduled for release in the spring. Based on excerpts presented by Mr. Sveinsson, the new music promises to be as exceptional as the best of the band's catalog. Mr. Holm called it "introverted", while Mr. Birgisson said it was "floaty and minimal". "An ambient album" was how Mr. Dýrason described it, with "a slow takeoff toward something". For a visitor who heard a preliminary recording in which Mr. Birgisson's falsetto was surrounded by rich choral voices and what sounded like a pipe organ, the music was thrilling".

Beginning in February 2012, Sigur Rós announced their live return with festival appearances at Bestival in England, Summer Sonic Festival in Japan, and other shows in Ireland, Switzerland, Germany, Austria, France, Poland, and Italy. The band was also added to Montréal's Osheaga 2012 lineup, and the 2012 Lollapalooza lineup.

After a four-year hiatus, an interview with the band in the March 2012 issue of Q magazine confirmed the completion of a new album, titled Valtari, scheduling its release on 28 May 2012. On 26 March 2012, the band released the first official single from the album, "Ekki múkk." On 14 April 2012, a lower quality version of the complete album leaked out on the internet. On 10 May 2012, Sigur Rós's new track "Dauðalogn" was premiered on "The Departed", the season 3 finale of The Vampire Diaries.

It was rumored that an already-complete additional album would follow-up their sixth release, Valtari. However, the band has dismissed the rumor as a "fabrication".

On 2 November 2012, Georg Hólm confirmed that the band had already started work on a new album, due to be released some time in 2013. He described it as a dramatic change of direction, "an anti-Valtari". The band performed a new song, entitled "Brennisteinn" ('brimstone'), in Reykjavík on 4 November at the Iceland Airwaves 2012 festival, to favourable reception. On 12 November 2012, the band announced a new North American tour, to take place in March and April 2013. The band also announced that every ticket purchased will include a new digital copy of a three-track EP, containing new and unreleased music, made available to ticket holders on 22 March 2013.

=== 2013–2019: Kveikur and departures of Kjartan and Orri ===
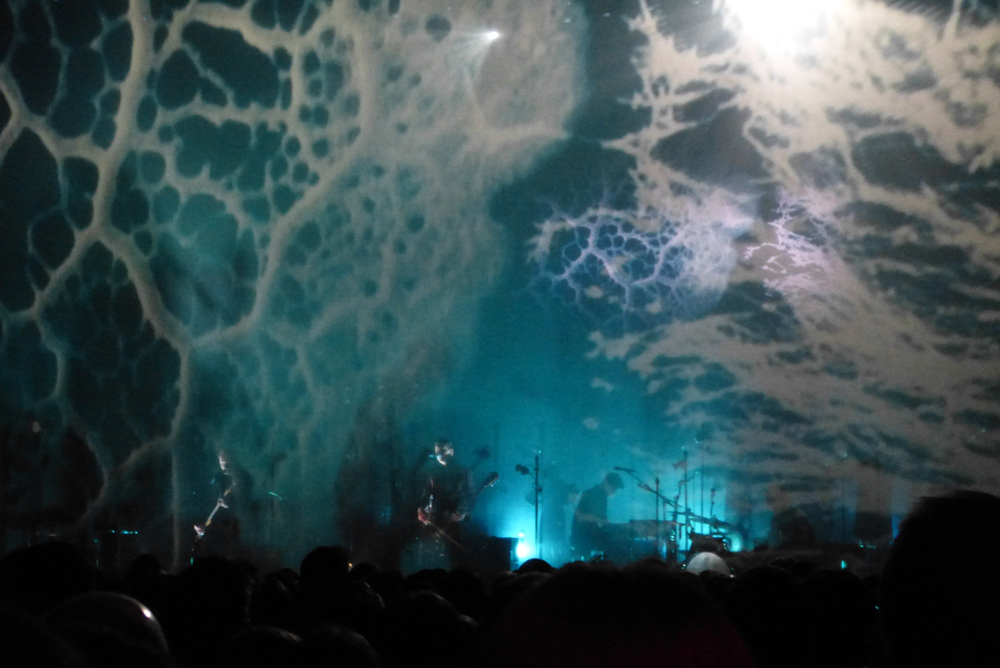
Sigur Rós performing live at the Wolverhampton Civic Hall, England, in 2013

On 24 January 2013, Sigur Rós announced in a Q&A on Reddit that Kjartan had left the band, feeling it was time "to do something different". They announced their seventh studio album, Kveikur, on 22 March. On the same day, they also released the album's first single: "Brennisteinn". The album was released on 14 June (releasing two days earlier in Japan, and four days later in the US) and marked both a musical and thematic change for the band, providing a more aggressive sound, compared to their previous albums. The album was well received by critics, scoring 80 on Metacritic, with several reviewers praising for the band's new musical approach, as well as a lack of commercialism. The release was marked, by the band, with a new tour, as well as an interactive musical experience, where fans could live stream a concert, taking control of the camera. The band later performed at the iTunes Festival, on 2 September 2013, where selected portions of their concert were later released on 21 October.

The band provided original music and a rendition of "The Simpsons Theme", as well as a brief cameo, for the Simpsons episode "The Saga of Carl", which aired on 19 May 2013.

The band appeared in the HBO TV series Game of Thrones episode "The Lion and the Rose" on 13 April 2014. They also covered the song "The Rains of Castamere", which was originally recorded by the National for the earlier episode "Blackwater".

Georg and Orri worked with Georg's brother Kjartan Dagur "KD" Hólm and the composer Hilmar Örn Hilmarsson on the soundtrack to The Show of Shows: 100 Years of Vaudeville, Circuses and Carnivals. This was released as an album, Circe – Music Composed for The Show of Shows, on the Krunk label in the UK on 28 August 2015.

A reissue of the band's second album, Ágætis byrjun, was announced in early 2015. It was announced to feature previously unheard studio and live recordings as well as photographic and documentary material from their personal archives.

On 31 January 2017 it was announced that the band would be touring later in 2017, playing concerts in the United States, Canada, New Zealand, Australia, Japan, the United Kingdom, France, Belgium, the Netherlands, Sweden, Norway, Denmark, Germany, Austria, Italy, Switzerland, Croatia, Chile, Argentina and Brazil.

The band, in collaboration with Alex Somers, produced two instrumental pieces, "End" and "Match", for the Black Mirror season four episode "Hang the DJ", aired on 29 December 2017.

On 8 May 2018, the band released a new multimedia project called Liminal, which they described as an "endless mixtape" of ambient music which will be continuously added to over time. In addition, Jónsi, Somers, and frequent collaborator Paul Corley announced a series of "live soundbaths," where the music would be played in front of an audience.

In September 2018, Orri was accused of sexual assault by artist Meagan Boyd. On 1 October 2018, he announced that he had decided to leave the band "in light of the scale of this matter". In March 2019, Sigur Rós were charged with tax evasion, accused of having submitted incorrect tax returns from 2011 to 2014, evading 151 million Icelandic krona. The band members blamed their former accountant and said they were co-operating with the authorities. The case was dismissed in October 2019 but this decision was later overruled by an appellate court. Three members were cleared, but the charges against Jónsi and his company Frakkur proceeded. On March 24, 2023, all charges were dismissed.

=== 2020–present: Kjartan rejoins and Átta ===
In October 2020, the band announced that a new album, Odin's Raven Magic, an orchestral work that was debuted live in 2002, would be released on 4 December 2020. This album is a live recording of the orchestral piece being performed in Paris in 2004.

On 14 February 2022, Sigur Rós announced that Kjartan had rejoined them. The following week, they announced their first world tour in nearly five years. In addition to the tour, it was announced that the band are in the process of writing and recording a new album.

On 16 June 2023, Sigur Rós released "Blóðberg", the first single from their eighth studio album, Átta (eight in Icelandic). The self-produced album was recorded at Sundlaugin Studio, on the rural outskirts of Reykjavík.

On the 8th of May, 2026, members of the band performed "Hoppípolla" at the 100th birthday of David Attenborough, due to its association with Planet Earth.

== Vonlenska ==
Vonlenska (English: Hopelandic) is a term coined by the band to refer to the vocalizations that Jónsi sings on ( ) in lieu of lyrics in Icelandic. It takes its name from "Von", a song on Sigur Rós's debut album, Von, where it was first used. However, not all Sigur Rós songs are in Vonlenska; many are sung in Icelandic.

Vonlenska differs from both natural and constructed languages used for human communication. It consists of strings of meaningless syllables containing non-lexical vocables and phonemes. There is no grammatical relation between or among syllables, nor are they accompanied by clearly defined word boundaries. Vonlenska emphasizes the phonological and emotive qualities of human vocalizations, and it uses the melodic and rhythmic elements of singing without the conceptual content of language. In this way, it is similar to the use of scat singing in vocal jazz and puirt à beul in traditional Irish folk music and Scottish. The band's website describes it as "a form of gibberish vocals that fits to the music".

== Musical style and influences ==
Sigur Rós's music has been described as post-rock, and dream pop. Early influences for the band included British bands Spiritualized, the Verve, Ride, and Irish band My Bloody Valentine. The Scottish dream pop band Cocteau Twins was often cited as an influence on Birgisson early in his career; in fact he had not heard their music, but in an interview noted he was introduced to it subsequently by Alex Somers and remarked of the band "they're so good, man!".

== Awards and nominations ==
Year	Awards	Work	Category	Result
2000	Edda Awards	Angels of the Universe	Professional Category: Music	Won
2001	Shortlist Music Prize	Ágætis byrjun	Album of the Year	Won
2002	Icelandic Music Awards	"Viðrar vel til loftárása"	Video of the Year	Won
2003	Shortlist Music Prize	( )	Album of the Year	Nominated
2003	GAFFA-Prisen Awards	( )	Best Foreign Album	Nominated
2003	GAFFA-Prisen Awards	Themselves	Best Foreign Band	Nominated
2003	Edda Awards	Hlemmur	Professional Category: Sound/Vision	Won
2003	MTV EMA	"Untitled"	Best Video	Won
2004	Juno Awards	"Untitled"	Best Video	Nominated
2004	Grammy Awards	( )	Best Alternative Music Album	Nominated
2005	XM Nation Music Awards	Themselves	"Under the Radar" – Artist Most Overlooked by FM Radio	Nominated
2005	GAFFA-Prisen Awards	Themselves	Best International Group	Nominated
2005	Žebřík Music Awards	Themselves	Best International Group	Nominated
2006	Icelandic Music Awards	Themselves	Best Alternative Act	Won
2006	Icelandic Music Awards	Takk...	Best Rock Album	Won
2006	Icelandic Music Awards	Takk...	Best Album Design	Won
2006	MVPA Awards	"Glósóli"	Best Alternative Video	Nominated
2006	MVPA Awards	"Glósóli"	Best Cinematography	Nominated
2006	D&AD Awards	"Glósóli"	Best Cinematography	Wood Pencil
2007	Q Awards	Themselves	Q Innovation in Sound	Won
2008	UK Music Video Awards	"Gobbledigook"	Best Rock Video	Nominated
2008	Rober Awards Music Prize	"Gobbledigook"	Best Music Video	Nominated
2009	Icelandic Music Awards	"Gobbledigook"	Song of the Year	Nominated
2009	Icelandic Music Awards	"Inní mér syngur vitleysingur"	Song of the Year	Nominated
2009	Icelandic Music Awards	Themselves	Performer of the Year	Nominated
2009	Icelandic Music Awards	Themselves	Composer of the Year	Won
2009	Icelandic Music Awards	Jón Þór Birgisson	Vocalist of the Year	Nominated
2009	Icelandic Music Awards	Með suð í eyrum við spilum endalaust	Pop/Rock Record of the Year	Won
2009	Icelandic Music Awards	Með suð í eyrum við spilum endalaust	Album of the Year	Nominated
2009	Hungarian Music Awards	Með suð í eyrum við spilum endalaust	Alternative Music Album of the Year	Nominated
2010	MOJO Awards	Themselves	Outstanding Contribution to Music Award	Won
2012	Antville Music Video Awards	Themselves	Best Commissioning Artist	Nominated
2012	Antville Music Video Awards	"Fjögur píanó"	Best Choreography	Nominated
2012	Camerimage	"Fjögur píanó"	Best Music Video	Nominated
2013	Camerimage	"Valtari"	Best Music Video	Nominated
2013	UK Music Video Awards	"Stormur"	Best Interactive Video	Nominated
2013	UK Music Video Awards	"Valtari"	Best Choreography	Won
2013	UK Music Video Awards	"Valtari"	Best Cinematography	Nominated
2013	MVPA Awards	"Learning Towards Solace"	Best Cinematography	Nominated
2013	MVPA Awards	"Learning Towards Solace"	Best Editing	Nominated
2013	MVPA Awards	"Learning Towards Solace"	Best Video Produced for Under 25 000	Nominated
2013	MVPA Awards	"Valtari"	Best Video Produced for Under 25 000	Nominated
2013	O Music Awards	"Valtari"	Too Much Ass for TV	Nominated
2013	Webby Awards	"Fjögur píanó"	Online Film & Video – Music	Won
2013	London Short Film Festival	"Ekki múkk"	British Council Award for Best UK Short	Won
2013	UK Festival Awards	Themselves	Headline Performance of the Year	Nominated
2014	Nordic Music Video Awards	"Brennisteinn"	Best Post Production	Nominated
2014	Lovie Awards	Themselves	Artist of the Year	Won
2014	World Music Awards	Themselves	World's Best Group	Nominated
2014	World Music Awards	Kveikur	World's Best Album	Nominated
2014	Icelandic Music Awards	Kveikur	Album of the Year	Nominated
2016	European Festival Awards	Themselves	Best Headliner	Nominated
2017	Icelandic Music Awards	"Óveður"	Video of the Year	Nominated
2017	Hungarian Music Awards	"Óveður"	Alternative Music Album of the Year	Nominated
2019	Music Video Festival	"Tonandi"	Innovation	Won

== Members ==
Current members

- Jón Þór "Jónsi" Birgisson – lead vocals, guitar, keyboards, harmonium, bass guitar (1994–present)
- Georg "Goggi" Hólm – bass guitar, glockenspiel, toy piano, keyboards, backing vocals (1994–present)
- Kjartan "Kjarri" Sveinsson – piano, organ, synthesizers, keyboards, programming, guitar, flute, tin whistle, oboe, backing vocals (1998–2013, 2022–present)

Touring musicians

- Ólafur Björn "Óbó" Ólafsson – drums, percussion (2022–present); keyboards, oboe, brass (2012–2013, 2022–present)

Former members

- Ágúst Ævar Gunnarsson – drums, percussion (1994–1999)
- Orri Páll Dýrason – drums, percussion, samples, keyboards (1999–2018)

Former touring musicians

- Kjartan Dagur "KD" Hólm – guitar (2012–2013)

Former touring ensembles

- Amiina – strings (1999–2008, 2022)
- Brassgat í bala (The Horny Brasstards) – brass (2005–2008, 2022)
- The Okkur Ensemble (2012–2013)
  - Sigrún Jónsdóttir – trombone
  - Laufey Jensdóttir – violin
  - Ingrid Karlsdóttir – viola
  - Guðbjörg Hlín "Guggý" Guðmundsdóttir – violin
  - Eiríkur Orri Ólafsson – trumpet
  - Bergrún Snæbjörnsdóttir – French horn

== Discography ==
- Von (1997)
- Ágætis byrjun (1999)
- ( ) (2002)
- Takk... (2005)
- Með suð í eyrum við spilum endalaust (2008)
- Valtari (2012)
- Kveikur (2013)
- Átta (2023)
