= Chicane discography =

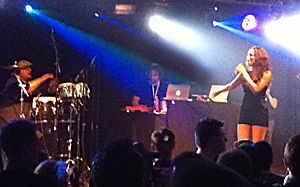
- Chicane performing in Stockholm, May 2011
- Studio albums: 9
- Extended plays: 2
- Compilation albums: 3
- Singles: 40
- Music videos: 15

The discography of British electronic musician Chicane consists of nine studio albums, three compilation albums, two extended plays and forty singles. His debut single, "Offshore" reached number fourteen in the United Kingdom and number five on the United States dance chart in 1996. The subsequent debut album, Far from the Maddening Crowds, peaked at number forty-nine in the UK.

Chicane had his commercial breakthrough with the album Behind the Sun, released on 27 March 2000. It sold over 100,000 copies and was certified gold in the UK, and spawned the hit singles "Saltwater" and "Don't Give Up". "Saltwater" sampled "Theme from Harry's Game" by Irish group Clannad and became a popular track in nightclubs across Europe; it reached number six in the UK and charted in countries such as Australia, Ireland and the Netherlands. "Don't Give Up" was a collaboration with Canadian singer Bryan Adams. It became a number one hit in the UK and a top 20 hit in the United States, Australia, Finland and Belgium.

On 23 July 2007 Chicane released his third studio album, Somersault on his own record label, Modena. The lead single, released in 2006, "Stoned in Love" featured Welsh singer Tom Jones and reached number seven in the UK. In 2009 Chicane released a cover version of "Hoppípolla" by Icelandic band Sigur Rós, titled "Poppiholla", which became his fourth top 10 hit in the UK. Chicane released his fourth studio album, Giants on 2 August 2010. Less radio friendly singles includes "Right Here Right Now", "Footprint" and "Nagasaki Badger" under the Disco Citizens alias. Released from 1995 to 1998 and initially a collaboration with producer Leo Elstob, all three charted within the top 60 in the UK.

== Albums ==
=== Studio albums ===
Title	Album details	Peak chart positions											Certifications (sales thresholds)
Title	Album details	UK	UK Dance	AUS	BEL	FIN	GER	IRE	NZ	NLD	SWI	US Dance	Certifications (sales thresholds)
Far from the Maddening Crowds	Released: 20 October 1997; Label: Xtravaganza; Format: CD, cassette, digital download, vinyl	49	36	—	—	—	—	—	—	—	—	—	BPI: Silver
Behind the Sun	Released: 27 March 2000; Label: Xtravaganza; Format: CD, cassette, digital download, vinyl	10	33	15	50	34	33	50	7	62	66	—	BPI: Gold
Somersault	Released: 23 July 2007; Label: Modena; Format: CD, digital download	104	10	—	—	—	—	—	—	—	—	—	
Giants	Released: 2 August 2010; Label: Modena; Format: CD, digital download	35	2	—	—	—	—	—	—	—	—	—	
Thousand Mile Stare	Released: 16 April 2012; Label: Modena; Format: CD, digital download	37	2	—	—	—	—	—	—	—	—	—	
The Sum of Its Parts	Released: 26 January 2015; Label: Modena; Format: CD, digital download	44	3	—	—	—	—	—	—	36	—	20	
The Place You Can't Remember, the Place You Can't Forget	Released: 8 June 2018; Label: Modena, Armada; Format: CD, digital download	—	3	—	—	—	—	—	—	—	—	—	
Everything We Had to Leave Behind	Released: 23 April 2021; Label: Modena, Armada; Format: CD, digital download	—	1	—	—	—	—	—	—	—	—	—	
Nevertheless	Released: 9 June 2023; Label: Modena, Armada; Format: CD, digital download	—	1	—	—	—	—	—	—	—	—	—	
Trampolines	Released: 15 November 2024; Label: Modena, Armada; Format: CD, digital download	—	24	—	—	—	—	—	—	—	—	—	
"—" denotes releases that did not chart or was not released in that territory.

=== Compilation albums ===
Title	Album details	Peak chart positions				Certifications (sales thresholds)
Title	Album details	UK	IRE	NLD	US Dance	Certifications (sales thresholds)
Visions of Ibiza	Released: 2001; Label: Beechwood Music Ltd.; Format: CD	—	—	—	—	
The Best of Chicane: 1996–2008	Released: 6 October 2008; Label: Modena; Format: CD	10	99	100	—	BPI: Gold
Twenty	Released: 29 July 2016; Label: Modena; Format: CD, LP, digital download	40	—	112	25	
Sun:Sets 2018 (Selected by Chicane)	Released: 2 February 2018; Label: Armada Music; Format: CD, digital download	—	—	—	—	
The Greatest Misses	Released: 1 December 2023; Label: Armada Music; Format: CD, digital download	—	—	—	—	
"—" denotes releases that did not chart or was not released in that territory.

=== Other albums ===
Title	Album details
Easy to Assemble	Release: Cancelled (scheduled for 2003); Label: WEA; Format: N/A

== Extended plays ==
Title	Information
Chilled	Released: 16 August 1999; Label: Edel; Format: CD
Ibiza	Released: 2 October 2015; Label: Modena; Format: Digital download

== Singles ==
=== As lead artist ===
Title	Year	Peak chart positions										Certifications (sales thresholds)	Album
Title	Year	UK	UK Dance	AUS	BEL	GER	IRL	ITA	NLD	SWI	US Dance	Certifications (sales thresholds)	Album
"Offshore"	1996	14	1	—	—	34	12	—	42	41	5	BPI: Silver	Far from the Maddening Crowds
"Sunstroke"	1997	21	3	—	—	63	20	—	—	—	19		Far from the Maddening Crowds
"Offshore '97" (with Power Circle)	1997	17	3	—	—	—	—	—	—	—	—		Far from the Maddening Crowds
"Lost You Somewhere"	1997	35	11	—	—	—	—	—	—	—	—		Far from the Maddening Crowds
"Red Skies"	1998	—	—	—	—	—	—	—	—	—	—		Far from the Maddening Crowds
"Strong in Love" (featuring Mason)	1998	32	7	—	—	—	—	—	—	—	5		Non-album single
"Saltwater" (featuring Máire Brennan)	1999	6	1	31	5	16	14	—	23	32	—	BPI: Platinum; BEA: Gold	Behind the Sun
"Don't Give Up" (featuring Bryan Adams)	2000	1	2	6	17	24	11	20	21	42	3	BPI: Gold; ARIA: Gold	Behind the Sun
"No Ordinary Morning" / "Halcyon"	2000	28	6	59	—	—	—	—	—	96	—		Behind the Sun
"Autumn Tactics" (featuring Justine Suissa)	2000	44	9	82	59	—	—	49	—	—	—		Behind the Sun
"Saltwater 2003" (featuring Máire Brennan)	2003	43	13	—	—	—	—	—	—	—	—		Non-album single
"Love on the Run" (featuring Peter Cunnah)	2003	33	8	50	—	38	46	—	85	—	—		Easy to Assemble^{[A]} (unreleased)
"Don't Give Up 2004" (featuring Bryan Adams)	2004	43	10	—	—	—	—	—	—	—	—		Non-album single
"Stoned in Love" (featuring Tom Jones)	2006	7	9	43	—	—	23	26	66	—	—	BPI: Silver	Somersault
"Come Tomorrow"	2007	—	—	—	—	—	—	—	—	—	—		Somersault
"Bruised Water" (with Natasha Bedingfield)	2008	42	—	—	30	—	—	—	35	—	—		The Best of Chicane: 1996–2008
"Poppiholla"	2009	7	—	—	—	—	30	—	—	—	—	BPI: Silver	Giants
"Hiding All the Stars"	2009	42	—	—	23	—	—	—	—	—	—		Giants
"Come Back" (featuring Paul Young)	2010	151	—	—	—	—	—	—	—	—	—		Giants
"Middledistancerunner" (featuring Adam Young)	2010	173	—	—	—	—	—	—	—	—	—		Giants
"Where Do I Start"	2010	—	—	—	—	—	—	—	—	—	—		Giants
"Going Deep" (featuring Aggi Dukes)	2011	—	—	—	—	—	—	—	—	—	—		Thousand Mile Stare
"Three"	2012	—	—	—	—	—	—	—	—	—	—		Thousand Mile Stare
"One Thousand Suns" (with Ferry Corsten and Christian Burns)	2013	—	—	—	—	—	—	—	—	—	—		The Sum of Its Parts
"One More Time" (featuring Duane Harden)	2013	—	—	—	—	—	—	—	—	—	—		The Sum of Its Parts
"No More I Sleep" (featuring Senadee)	2014	—	—	—	—	—	—	—	—	—	—		The Sum of Its Parts
"Still With Me" (featuring Bo Bruce)	2014	—	—	—	—	—	—	—	—	—	—		The Sum of Its Parts
"Oxygen" (featuring Paul Aiden)	2015	—	—	—	—	—	—	—	—	—	—		The Sum of Its Parts
"Ibiza Strings" / "Ibiza Bleeps"	2015	—	—	—	—	—	—	—	—	—	—		Ibiza EP
"Fibreglasses"	2015	—	—	—	—	—	—	—	—	—	—		The Sum of Its Parts
"Carry Me Home" (with Steve Edwards)	2016	—	—	—	—	—	—	—	—	—	—		Twenty
"How Does Your House Work?" (with Barbarella)	2017	—	—	—	—	—	—	—	—	—	—		Non-album single
"Gorecki" (featuring Hannah Robinson)	2017	—	—	—	—	—	—	—	—	—	—		The Place You Can't Remember, The Place You Can't Forget
"Serendipity"	2018	—	—	—	—	—	—	—	—	—	—		The Place You Can't Remember, The Place You Can't Forget
"A Love That's Hard to Find"	2018	—	—	—	—	—	—	—	—	—	—		The Place You Can't Remember, The Place You Can't Forget
"Nirvana" (featuring Rosalee O'Connell)	2018	—	—	—	—	—	—	—	—	—	—		The Place You Can't Remember, The Place You Can't Forget
"Everything We Had to Leave Behind" (featuring Joseph Aquilina)	2020	—	—	—	—	—	—	—	—	—	—		Everything We Had to Leave Behind
"Never Look Back"	2020	—	—	—	—	—	—	—	—	—	—		Everything We Had to Leave Behind
"Make You Stay"	2021	—	—	—	—	—	—	—	—	—	—		Everything We Had to Leave Behind
"Hello, Goodbye"	2021	—	—	—	—	—	—	—	—	—	—		Everything We Had to Leave Behind
"8 (Circle)"	2021	—	—	—	—	—	—	—	—	—	—		Everything We Had to Leave Behind
"Don't Look Down"	2021	—	—	—	—	—	—	—	—	—	—		Everything We Had to Leave Behind
"1000 More Suns" (featuring Joseph Aquilina)	2021	—	—	—	—	—	—	—	—	—	—		Everything We Had to Leave Behind
"Sailing"	2021	—	—	—	—	—	—	—	—	—	—		Everything We Had to Leave Behind
"One Foot in the Past, One Foot in the Future"	2021	—	—	—	—	—	—	—	—	—	—		Everything We Had to Leave Behind
"An Ocean Apart"	2021	—	—	—	—	—	—	—	—	—	—		Everything We Had to Leave Behind
"Capricorn"	2021	—	—	—	—	—	—	—	—	—	—		Everything We Had to Leave Behind
"Now or Never"	2021	—	—	—	—	—	—	—	—	—	—		Everything We Had to Leave Behind
"Where This Whole Thing Began"	2022	—	—	—	—	—	—	—	—	—	—		Nevertheless
"We Were Once Kings"	2023	—	—	—	—	—	—	—	—	—	—		Nevertheless
"All This Time Alone" (with The Mannequin)	2023	—	—	—	—	—	—	—	—	—	—		Nevertheless
"Nevertheless" (with Paul Aiden)	2023	—	—	—	—	—	—	—	—	—	—		Nevertheless
"Nineteen Eighty Five"	2023	—	—	—	—	—	—	—	—	—	—		Nevertheless
"Hijóping"	2023	—	—	—	—	—	—	—	—	—	—		Nevertheless
"Summer in E Major" (with The Mannequin)	2023	—	—	—	—	—	—	—	—	—	—		Nevertheless
"Watching Over Me"	2024	—	—	—	—	—	—	—	—	—	—		Trampolines
"Freefall"	2024	—	—	—	—	—	—	—	—	—	—		Trampolines
"Love, Love, Love - Here I Come"	2024	—	—	—	—	—	—	—	—	—	—		Trampolines
"The Sleepless Year"	2024	—	—	—	—	—	—	—	—	—	—		Trampolines
"Day One"	2024	—	—	—	—	—	—	—	—	—	—		Trampolines
"Epilogue"	2024	—	—	—	—	—	—	—	—	—	—		Trampolines
"In the Moment"	2025	—	—	—	—	—	—	—	—	—	—		TBA
"Wherever I Go" (featuring Moya)	2025	—	—	—	—	—	—	—	—	—	—		TBA
"Who Do You Give Your Love To?" (featuring Moya)	2026	—	—	—	—	—	—	—	—	—	—		TBA
"—" denotes releases that did not chart or was not released in that territory.

Notes

- A Scheduled to be the third studio album, Easy to Assemble was never commercially released due to an internet leak of promotional copies.

=== as Disco Citizens ===
Title	Year	Peak chart positions				Album
Title	Year	UK	AUS	GER	IRE	Album
"Right Here Right Now"	1995	40	—	—	—	Non-album singles
"Footprint"	1997	34	77	50	21	Non-album singles
"Nagasaki Badger"	1998	56	—	—	—	Non-album singles

=== as Sitvac ===
Title	Year	Album
"Wishful Thinking"	1996	Non-album single
