= Twenty (Chicane album) =

Compilation album by Chicane
- Released: 29 July 2016
- Recorded: 1996–2016
- Genre: Trance; house; electronica; ambient
- Label: Modena; Armada; Sony
- Producer: Nick Bracegirdle

Chicane chronology
The Sum of Its Parts (2015)	Twenty (2016)	The Place You Can't Remember, the Place You Can't Forget (2018)

Singles from Twenty
- 1. "Carry Me Home" Released: 3 June 2016

Twenty is a compilation album by British electronic dance music act Chicane, released on 29 July 2016 through Modena Records The album is in two parts; the first half being a remix album, and the second being a greatest hits compilation. However another greatest hits album, The Best of Chicane: 1996–2008, has been previously released. Exclusive songs are featured on the album, including its single "Carry Me Home" (with Steve Edwards), a rework of the song of the same name by gospel house group Gloworm. The album's title refers to Chicane's twentieth anniversary in the music industry.

== Background ==
As with his previous greatest hits album, "No Ordinary Morning", "Don't Give Up" and "Saltwater" are re-recordings, as the original recordings were still owned by Xtravaganza and were unable to be licensed for this compilation due to a dispute between Chicane and the label's boss Alex Gold, dated back to 2002. Chicane's previous recordings which had been distributed by Edel Records in 1996/1997 are featured in their original form as Xtravaganza lost the rights to them.

== Track listing ==
=== CD & digital download ===
Disc 1
No.	Title	Writer(s)	Length
1.	"Offshore" (Thomas Datt Remix)	Nicholas Bracegirdle, Leo Elstob	7:34
2.	"Saltwater" (featuring Máire Brennan; Jody Wisternoff Remix)	Bracegirdle, Ciarán Brennan, Pól Brennan, Ray Hedges	8:41
3.	"Poppiholla" (Anniversary Mix)	Bracegirdle, Georg Hólm, Jón Þór Birgisson, Kjartan Sveinsson, Orri Páll Dýrason	6:40
4.	"Don't Give Up" (featuring Bryan Adams; Philip George Remix)	Bracegirdle, Adams, Hedges	5:50
5.	"Offshore" (Grum Remix)	Bracegirdle, Elstob	5:46
6.	"Saltwater" (featuring Máire Brennan; Kryder Remix)	Bracegirdle, C Brennan, P Brennan, Hedges	6:39
7.	"Still with Me" (featuring Bo Bruce; Disco Citizens Remix)	Bracegirdle, Cisneros, Soto, Reed	5:22
8.	"Windbreaks"	Bracegirdle, Richard Searle	5:14
9.	"Dandelion"	Bracegirdle	6:20
10.	"Carry Me Home" (with Steve Edwards; Twenty Rave Remix)	Bracegirdle, Cedric Johnson, Will Mount	5:29
11.	"38 Weeks" (vocals by Lisa Gerrard)	Bracegirdle, Corsten, Gerrard	6:10
12.	"Fibreglasses"	Bracegirdle, Searle	5:47

Disc 2
No.	Title	Writer(s)	Length
1.	"Already There"	Bracegirdle	2:57
2.	"Offshore" (Original Mix)	Bracegirdle, Elstob	6:48
3.	"Saltwater" (featuring Máire Brennan; Original Mix)	Bracegirdle, C Brennan, P Brennan, Hedges	3:23
4.	"Poppiholla" (Original Mix)	Bracegirdle, Hólm, Birgisson, Sveinsson, Dýrason	3:42
5.	"Don't Give Up" (featuring Bryan Adams; Original Mix)	Bracegirdle, Adams, Hedges	3:31
6.	"No Ordinary Morning"	Bracegirdle, Hedges, Martin Brannigan	5:09
7.	"What am I Doing (Prt 1)"	Bracegirdle, James Hockley, Hedges	3:45
8.	"Sunstroke" (Original Mix)	Bracegirdle, Hockley	6:18
9.	"Barefoot"	Bracegirdle,	6:03
10.	"Playing Fields" (featuring Kate Walsh)	Bracegirdle, Walsh	3:17
11.	"1000 Suns" (with Ferry Corsten, featuring Christian Burns)	Bracegirdle,	6:03
12.	"Stoned in Love" (featuring Tom Jones; Vertigo Mix)	Bracegirdle, Jones, Pickering, Hedges	5:50
13.	"Three" (with Vigri)	Bracegirdle	5:32
14.	"HIjóp" (with Vigri)	Bracegirdle	5:14
15.	"Time of Your Life (Prt 2)"	Bracegirdle	2:46
16.	"Early"	Bracegirdle	4:20

== Charts ==
Chart performance for Twenty
Chart (2016)	Peak position
UK Albums (OCC)	40
UK Dance Albums (OCC)	1
UK Independent Albums (OCC)	5
US Dance/Electronic Albums (Billboard)	25
