= The Best of Chicane: 1996–2008 =

Greatest hits album by Chicane
- Released: 6 October 2008
- Recorded: 1996–2008
- Genre: Trance; dance; house; ambient; chillout; Balearic; pop
- Length: 76:19
- Label: Modena; Enzo
- Producer: Nick Bracegirdle

Chicane chronology
| Somersault (2007) | The Best of Chicane: 1996–2008 (2008) | Giants (2010) |

Singles from The Best of Chicane 1996–2008
- 1. "Bruised Water" Released: 25 August 2008; 2. "Poppiholla" Released: 13 July 2009

Professional ratings
Review scores
| Source | Rating |
|---|---|
| AllMusic (2008) | 4/5 stars |
| AllMusic (2009) | 4.5/5 stars |

The Best of Chicane: 1996–2008 is a greatest hits compilation album by the English music producer Chicane, released by Modena Records and Enzo Records on 6 October 2008.

== Background ==
Tracks 3, 4 and 17 ("No Ordinary Morning", "Don't Give Up" and "Saltwater") are re-recordings as the original sound recordings were still owned by Xtravaganza and were unable to be licensed for this compilation due to a dispute between Chicane and Xtaravagnza boss Alex Gold which dated back to 2002. Chicane's previous Xtravaganza recordings, which had been distributed by Edel Records in 1996/1997, are here in their original form as Xtravaganza lost the rights to those sound recordings. The album was re-released in 2009 to include the song "Poppiholla" which replaced track 12. This song was released as a single on 13 July 2009.

== Track listing ==
1. "Offshore" (Original Mix) – 6:58
2. "Bruised Water" featuring Natasha Bedingfield (Chicane Rework Mix) – 2:58
3. "No Ordinary Morning" – 5:07
4. "Don't Give Up" featuring Bryan Adams – 3:28
5. "Spirit" featuring Jewel (Chicane Rework Mix) – 2:56
6. "Halcyon" (2008 Version) – 7:13
7. "Sunstroke" – 3:49
8. "Stoned in Love" featuring Tom Jones – 3:38
9. "Wake Up" featuring Keane – 6:18
10. "Come Tomorrow" (edit) – 3:32
11. "Leaving Town" (edit) – 3:52
12. "Daylight" – 4:20
13. "From Blue to Green" (edit) – 2:38
14. "Love on the Run" featuring Peter Cunnah – 3:36
15. "Locking Down" (Dead Guys Mix) – 3:03
16. "U R Always" (Chicane Rework Mix) – 4:38
17. "Saltwater" featuring Máire Brennan – 3:21
18. "Early" – 4:19

== Charts ==
Chart performance for The Best of Chicane: 1996–2008
| Chart (2008–2009) | Peak position |
|---|---|
| Dutch Albums (Album Top 100) | 100 |
| Irish Albums (IRMA) | 99 |
| UK Albums (OCC) | 10 |
