= Easy to Assemble (album) =

- Cover art for the album's promotional copies

Recording by Chicane
- Released: Cancelled; intended for 2003
- Studio: Modena One
- Genre: Trance, Ambient. Dance, Pop
- Length: 55:33
- Label: WEA
- Producer: Nick Bracegirdle

Chicane chronology
Visions of Ibiza (2001)	Easy to Assemble (2003)	Somersault (2007)

Singles from Easy to Assemble
- 1. "Love on the Run" Released: 2002

Easy to Assemble is an unreleased studio album by British electronic music artist Chicane. The album would have been the third studio album in his main discography and the proper follow-up to 2000's Behind the Sun.

In 2002, Bracegirdle signed to WEA and had finished his third album, which was all set to be released in 2003. However, when review copies were sent out, the record label WEA was bought out by Edgar Bronfman Jr of Warner Music Group resulted in the A&R manager and music director who signed him leaving the company, and its release was put on hold while Bracegirdle negotiated an exit from his contract, and as soon as he extracted himself from his contract, he prepared to release the album independently. The entire album was later leaked online on several peer-to-peer sites and was pirated to such an extent that it was felt that it was not worth releasing it officially, which resulted in the commercial release of the album being cancelled.

== History ==
On 27 March 2000, Chicane released his second studio album Behind the Sun. It was a commercial success, reaching the Top 10 in the UK Albums Chart, and would go on to be certified Gold by BPI, selling over 100,000 copies. This would be the final studio released through his record label Xtravaganza as over the next two years, Bracegirdle became engaged in a lawsuit with Xtravaganza, which resulted in Chicane's departure from the label and his signing with WEA for the release of a third album, Easy to Assemble. As a result of the lawsuit, Chicane lost the rights to the sound recordings from the Behind the Sun album, including its singles. Originally scheduled for 2003, the album's release was preceded by the lead single "Love on the Run", followed by a promotional single, "Locking Down". After promotional copies of the album were distributed, however, Easy to Assemble was not commercially released as expected—though over the following year, the official Chicane website was periodically updated with messages announcing further delays towards a still-expected release.

More recently, biographies, interviews, and publicity have stated that the album's release was outright prevented due to an Internet leak and bootlegging of the promotional album. It was also revealed that Bracegirdle had left Warner following its 2003 sale to Edgar Bronfman, Jr. and was planning an independent release at the time.

Eventually, under the new management of John Cavanagh, April 2006 saw the release of a new single, "Stoned in Love", on Globe Records through Universal Music Group, featuring singer Tom Jones on vocals. (Press Release). At the time of the announcement the song was also played twice by Pete Tong.

The track received substantial UK TV promotion in the run up to the week of release, featuring live performances on Friday Night with Jonathan Ross, The New Paul O'Grady Show and a semi-live performance on BBC's now defunct Top of the Pops. Jones and Bracegirdle were also interviewed on Channel 5 News; when asked in the 5 News interview where he had been since "Don't Give Up", Bracegirdle replied that he had been "basically stuffed" by the internet bootlegging of the album Easy to Assemble.

His next album, titled Somersault, was released on 23 July 2007.

Two of the tracks from the unreleased album, "Arizona" and "Spirit", are featured on the Somersault album, the latter of which being rerecorded. Another track, "Daylight", "Love On The Run" and the unreleased Dead Guys VS. Chicane Edit of "Locking Down", would be featured on his first compilation album The Best of Chicane: 1996–2008.

== Track listing ==
No.	Title	Writer(s)	Length
1.	"Love on the Run" (featuring Peter Cunnah)	Bracegirdle	4:53
2.	"Daylight" (featuring Tracy Ackerman)	Bracegirdle	5:19
3.	"East Side Story" (featuring Bryan Adams)	Bracegirdle, Bryan Adams	3:46
4.	"In Praise of the Sun" (featuring Vanessa St James)	Bracegirdle	6:52
5.	"Locking Down" (featuring Melissa Baten)	Bracegirdle	4:46
6.	"Spirit" (featuring Jewel)	Bracegirdle	4:46
7.	"Arizona (Part 2)"	Bracegirdle	3:01
8.	"Some Might Say" (featuring Joel Edwards)	Bracegirdle	4:50
9.	"Kilometre"	Bracegirdle	6:14
10.	"Something Wrong" (featuring Nadia Jordan)	Bracegirdle	4:17
11.	"Empires"	Bracegirdle	7:14
