= Far from the Madding Crowd (disambiguation) =

Far from the Madding Crowd is a novel by Thomas Hardy.

Far from the Madding Crowd may also refer to:

== Film and television ==
- Adaptations of the Thomas Hardy novel:
  - Far from the Madding Crowd (1915 film), directed by Laurence Trimble
  - Far from the Madding Crowd (1967 film), directed by John Schlesinger
  - Far from the Madding Crowd (1998 film), directed by Nicholas Renton
  - Far from the Madding Crowd (2015 film), directed by Thomas Vinterberg
- "Far from the Madding Crowd", an episode of the anime Kill la Kill

== Music ==
- Far from the Maddening Crowds, a 1997 album by Chicane
- Far from the Madding Crowd, a 2004 album by the progressive metal band Wuthering Heights

== Other uses ==
- "Far from the Madding Crowd", a quotation from the poem Elegy Written in a Country Churchyard by Thomas Gray

== See also ==
- The Madding Crowd, a 2000 album by Nine Days
