= Sylvia Mason-James =

British singer

- Born: 8 December 1958 (age 67); London, England, United Kingdom
- Occupation: Singer

Sylvia Mason-James (born 8 December 1958) is a British singer who has worked extensively as a backing vocalist and solo artist.

== Early life and career ==
Mason-James was born on 8 December 1958 in south London, United Kingdom to immigrants from Jamaica. She started her career with the disco band Voyage in 1977. She performed a duet with Jimmy Nail on his chart-topping single "Ain't No Doubt" in 1992, and appeared as a backing vocalist on the 1992 Joan Armatrading album Square the Circle, along with Linda Lewis and her sister Shirley Lewis. She appeared as the vocalist on Chicane's "Strong in Love" in 1998 (Chicane featuring Mason) and Freemasons' "Nothing but a Heartache" in 2007. She has also released a solo single, a cover version of the Diana Ross song "Touch Me in the Morning".

In the early 2000s, Mason-James sang on UK garage duo Scott and Leon's "You Used to Hold Me", "Shine On", and "Sounds of Eden" (under the duo's alias Deep Cover). In 2005, she appeared as a vocalist on two songs from Superchumbo's Wowie Zowie album. She has appeared as a backing vocalist on songs by artists including Go West, Simple Minds, Adam Rickitt, Robbie Williams, Cher, Bo Selecta, Swing Out Sister, Sheena Easton, the Blow Monkeys and most frequently, Pet Shop Boys.

Mason-James has also toured extensively with Pet Shop Boys, including Glastonbury 2000 where they played second billing to Travis on The Pyramid Stage, at Live 8 in 2005, their extensive 2006–2007 Fundamental Tour, as well as their month-long residency at the Savoy Theatre in 1997, their 2006 BBC Radio 2 concert on the live album Concrete, and their 1991 Performance Tour.. She performed again together with the Pet Shop Boys in some dates of their Obscure concerts at the Electric Ballroom in 2026.

Mason-James performed backing vocals for Roger Waters on the seventh and last leg of his The Dark Side of the Moon Live world tour between 27 April and 18 May 2008.
