= Visions of Ibiza =

Compilation album by Various artists
- Released: 2001
- Genre: Trance, ambient, Balearic beat
- Length: 155:10 (2 CDs)
- Label: Beechwood Music
- Compiler: Chicane (Nick Bracegirdle)

Various artists chronology
| Behind the Sun (2000) | Visions of Ibiza (2001) | Easy to Assemble (2003) |

Visions of Ibiza is a 2-CD set compiled by Chicane, released in 2001 under Beechwood Music Ltd.

== Track listing ==
Disc one

1. Kamasutra – "Sugar Steps"
2. Heights of Abraham – "E.V.A."
3. Aphex Twin – "Windowlicker"
4. The Sabres of Paradise – "Smokebelch II" (Beatless Mix)
5. Everything but the Girl – "Before Today" (Chicane Mix)
6. Chicane – "Offshore" (Disco Citizens radio edit)
7. Simple Minds – "A Brass Band in African Chimes"
8. Innocence – "Natural Thing"
9. Rabbit in the Moon – "Deeper"
10. Jean Michel Jarre – "Oxygene Part 2"
11. Chicane – "Early"
12. The Orb – "Into the Fourth Dimension"

Disc two

1. Leftfield – "Not Forgotten"
2. Slam – "Eterna"
3. Spice – "69 Overdrive" (Timo Maas Remix)
4. Mansun – "Wide Open Space" (Perfecto Mix)
5. Tin Tin Out – "Strings for Yasmin"
6. Planet Funk – "Chase the Sun" (Adam Freeland Mix)
7. Huff and Puff – "Help Me Make It"
8. South Street Players – "(Who?) Keeps Changing Your Mind" (Fresh Fruit Mix)
9. Bassheads – "Is There Anybody Out There?" (Desa Basshead)
10. Three Drives – "Greece 2000"
11. Dubstar – "Stars" (Way Out West Mix)
12. Rank 1 – "Airwave" (radio edit)
