= Come Back (Chicane song) =

Single by Chicane

from the album Giants
- Released: 24 May 2010
- Genre: Trance
- Length: 7:28
- Label: Modena
- Songwriter: Jack Lee
- Producers: Nick Bracegirdle; James Hockley

Chicane singles chronology
| "Hiding All the Stars" (2009) | "Come Back" (2010) | "Middledistancerunner" (2010) |

"Come Back" is a song by electronic dance music act, Chicane. The song is a re-work of English singer Paul Young's 1983 song "Come Back and Stay". The song was digitally released on 24 May 2010, and was later released on Chicane's fourth studio album, Giants.

== Music video ==
The video follows an Englishman wanting to win back his girlfriend who shows off some dance moves and makes a journey to places throughout Europe, which shows out on a map as a love heart.

== Track listing ==
"Come Back" single track listing
| No. | Title | Length |
|---|---|---|
| 1. | "Come Back" (radio edit) | 3:37 |
| 2. | "Come Back" (original club mix) | 7:59 |
| 3. | "Come Back" (Sidney Samson remix) | 5:51 |
| 4. | "Come Back" (ShockOne remix) | 6:46 |
| 5. | "Come Back" (Riley and Durrant remix) | 7:02 |
| 6. | "Come Back" (Dean Newton remix) | 7:01 |

== Charts ==
Chart performance for "Come Back"
| Chart (2010) | Peak position |
|---|---|
| UK Singles (The Official Charts Company) | 151 |
| UK Dance (Official Charts) | 13 |
