= Bruised Water =

2008 single by Chicane vs. Natasha Bedingfield

Single by Chicane vs. Natasha Bedingfield

from the album The Best of Chicane: 1996–2008
- Released: 25 August 2008
- Length: 3:01 (radio edit)
- Label: Modena; Armada Music
- Songwriters: Nick Bracegirdle; Ray Hedges; Pol Brennan; Ciarán Brennan; Natasha Bedingfield; Wayne Wilkins; Andrew Frampton; Paul Herman
- Producers: Nick Bracegirdle; Richard Searle

Chicane singles chronology
"Come Tomorrow" (2007)	"Bruised Water" (2008)	"Poppiholla" (2009)

Natasha Bedingfield singles chronology
"Pocketful of Sunshine" (2008)	"Bruised Water" (2008)	"Angel" (2008)

"Bruised Water" is a song by English musician Chicane. It is a mashup of Natasha Bedingfield's track "I Bruise Easily" with his own song, "Saltwater". The song was released on 25 August 2008 as a digital download.

== Releases ==
Professional ratings
Review scores
Source	Rating
Digital Spy	2/5 stars

"Bruised Water" was the first release from the revived Central Station Records in Australia. It was initially sent to radio in late 2008, but was never released as Central Station's parent company Destra Entertainment went into receivership. "Bruised Water" was released in the Netherlands by Armada Music in 2009.

== Music video ==
The music video features a man carrying a mermaid, who appears to be unconscious without water, across the town. He asks the fellow towns people for their help to provide water for her. The video was shot along several streets of the city centre of Málaga, Spain.

== Track listings ==
1. "Bruised Water" (Chicane re-work edit) – 8:00
2. "Bruised Water" (Mischa Daniels club mix) – 6:52
3. "Bruised Water" (Adam K. vocal mix) – 5:59
4. "Bruised Water" (original club mix) – 7:12
5. "Bruised Water" (Mischa Daniels dub mix) – 7:16
6. "Bruised Water" (Adam K. dub mix) – 6:04
7. "Bruised Water" (Mischa Daniels Dubstrumental edit) – 7:16
8. "Bruised Water" (original radio edit) – 2:59

Dutch CD single

1. "Bruised Water" (radio edit) – 3:01
2. "Bruised Water" (Michael Woods edit) – 3:05
3. "Bruised Water" (Chicane rework mix) – 8:02
4. "Bruised Water" (original mix) – 7:15
5. "Bruised Water" (Mischa Daniels club mix) – 6:53
6. "Bruised Water" (Michael Woods full mix) – 7:51

== Charts ==
Chart performance for "Bruised Water"
Chart (2008–2009)	Peak position
Australia (ARIA)	190
Belgium (Ultratop 50 Flanders)	30
Netherlands (Dutch Top 40)	22
Netherlands (Single Top 100)	35
UK Singles (OCC)	42
