= Adam K & Soha =

Canadian DJ and music production duo

- Origin: Toronto, Ontario, Canada
- Genres: Electronic; progressive house
- Years active: 2007—2013, 2016—present
- Members: Adam Kershen; Soha Radjpoust
- Website: djadamk.com (Adam K)

Adam K & Soha are a Canadian DJ and music production duo comprising Adam Kershen and Soha Radjpoust. They are based in Toronto, Ontario, Canada and specialize in progressive house music.

The duo has released a number of singles including "Twilight" on Adam K's label Hotbox Digital Music as well as numerous remixes for other artists including Kaskade, Benny Benassi, Tomcraft, and U2.

== Biography ==
=== History ===
Adam Kershen and Soha Radjpoust first met in junior high school and began jamming together and playing music in local bands. Kershen began working with studio equipment and discovered a talent for creating electronic music. Radjpoust trained on multiple instruments and pursued composing and writing his own songs and music. He graduated from Humber College's Jazz Music program specializing in piano.

The duo teamed up in 2006 to begin working on original progressive house tracks. Their 2007 release "Twilight" became their most successful single. The single peaked at #2 on the Beatport Top 100 chart and being named an "Essential New Tune" by BBC Radio 1's Pete Tong. A nomination for Best Progressive House Artist followed at the 2009 Beatport Music Awards as did a period of remix work for artists including "4 AM" - Kaskade, "Come Fly Away" - Benny Benassi, "Loneliness" - Tomcraft, "From The Speaker" - Mark Knight. More singles followed including "Long Distance", "Questions EP", "Save Us Now EP" and "Circadian Rhythm".

In 2013 the duo took a break from collaborating and took time to pursue their own sounds and ideas. They reunited in 2016 after seeing the positive reaction to re-posts of some of their past work on social media outlets.

=== Musical style and influences ===
Much of the group's work is in the style of melodic progressive house, and their influences in electronic music include BT, Daft Punk, and Tiesto. Adam is a studio engineer and played drums in several local bands during high school. Soha has been playing professionally since age 15 and is a musician in the genres of jazz, blues, funk, soul and rock. He is versed in traditional Persian instruments and he acknowledges his heritage as a key influence on his melodies and songwriting.

== Members ==
- Adam Kershen – DAW, production, keyboards
- Soha Radjpoust – DAW, production, keyboards

== Discography ==
=== Extended plays ===
Year	Title	Release details
2009	Questions	Released: April 15, 2009; Label: Toolroom; Format: Digital
2010	Save Us Now	Released: March 10, 2010; Label: Hotbox Digital; Format: Digital

=== Singles ===
Year	Title	Label
2007	Forced Entry	Hotbox Digital
2007	I Like Rhythm	Hotbox Digital
2007	Come To Me / Twilight	Hotbox Digital
2007	Twilight	Rebirth
2008	Long Distance	Drop It(Fektive)
2008	From The Speaker (with Mark Knight)	Toolroom
2011	Circadian Rhythm	Radj Music
2013	Lost In Orbit	Hotbox Digital
2015	Xperience	Self-released
2018	Twilight (Ten Years Of)	Hotbox Digital
2020	Sleepwalkers (featuring Denny White)	Hotbox Digital

=== Remixes ===
- 2007: Something About You (Adam K. & Soha Remix) - Hatiras
- 2008: Deep At Night (Adam K. & Soha Remix) - Ercola and Heikki L
- 2008 - 4 AM (Adam K. & Soha Remix) - Kaskade
- 2008 - Break My Fall (Adam K, Pettigrew, and Soha Remix) - Tiësto featuring BT
- 2008 - Cities In Dust (Adam K. & Soha Remix) - Junkie XL
- 2008 - Energy Bomb / Xtravaganza Ibiza 2008 (Adam K. & Soha Remix) - Alex Gold
- 2008 - Underlying Feeling (Adam K. & Soha Remix) - Sylvia Tosun
- 2008 - We Hold On (Adam K. & Soha Remix) - Kaz James
- 2008 - Come Fly Away (Adam K. & Soha Remix) - Benny Benassi featuring Channing
- 2009 - Take Me With You (Adam K. & Soha Club Mix) - Serge Devant featuring Emma Hewitt
- 2009 - The Rose of Jericho (Adam K. & Soha Remix) - BT
- 2009 - Bruised Water (Adam K. & Soha Club Mix) - Chicane and Natasha Bedingfield
- 2009 - Major Tom (Coming Home) (Adam K. & Soha Club Edit) - Shiny Toy Guns
- 2009 - Need To Feel Loved (Adam K. & Soha Vocal Mix) - Reflekt featuring Delline Bass
- 2009 - Magnificent (Adam K. & Soha Club Mix) - U2
- 2010 - I'm Back Again (Adam K. & Soha Mix) - Pete Tha Zouk, Abigail Bailey and Mastercris
- 2010 - Loneliness 2010 (Adam K. & Soha Remix) - Tomcraft
- 2010 - In The Music (Adam K. & Soha Remix) - Deepswing
- 2011 - Wake Up (Adam K. & Soha Remix) - Adam K. featuring Naan
- 2013 - Soulmate (Adam K. & Soha Remix) - Natasha Bedingfield
- 2014 - You're Not Alone (Adam K. & Soha Remix) - Adam K.
- 2016 - Never Coming Home (Adam K. & Soha Remix) - Fwlr featuring Kinley
