= Love on the Run (Chicane song) =

Single by Chicane featuring Peter Cunnah

from the album Easy to Assemble (Unreleased)
- Released: 24 February 2003
- Recorded: Modena One, United Kingdom
- Genre: Dance, pop
- Length: 3:40
- Label: Warner
- Songwriter(s): Brian Higgins, Nick Bracegirdle
- Producer(s): Chicane

Chicane singles chronology
"Saltwater 2003" (2003)	"Love on the Run" (2003)	"Don't Give Up 2004" (2004)

"Love on the Run" is a song by English electronic dance music artist Chicane featuring Northern Irish singer Peter Cunnah. It was released on 24 February 2003 in the United Kingdom, intended to be the lead single from the album Easy to Assemble, which was never released. Co-written with Brian Higgins of Xenomania, the song reached number thirty-three in the UK.

== Track listing ==
- European CD single
1. "Love on the Run" (Single Edit) – 3:40
2. "Love on the Run" (Chicane Long Mix) – 8:40
3. "Love on the Run" (Blank & Jones Remix) – 6:49
4. "Love on the Run" (Force Five Remix) – 8:44

== Personnel ==
- Brian Higgins – songwriting
- Nick Bracegirdle – songwriting
- Nadia Jordan – additional lyrics
- Chicane – production
- Walter Coelho – mastering

== Charts ==
Chart (2003)	Peak position
Australia (ARIA)	50
Germany (GfK)	38
Hungary (Single Top 40)	5
Ireland (IRMA)	43
Netherlands (Single Top 100)	85
UK Singles (OCC)	33
