= Going Deep =

Single by Chicane

from the album Thousand Mile Stare
- Released: 14 August 2011
- Genre: Trance
- Length: 3:04
- Label: Modena
- Songwriter(s): Nick Bracegirdle; Benjamin Alozie; Richard Searle
- Producer(s): Nick Bracegirdle

Chicane singles chronology
"Where Do I Start" (2010)	"Going Deep" (2011)	"Three" (2012)

"Going Deep" is a 2011 single by British electronic act Chicane. It features British producer and rapper Aggi Dukes on vocals. It is the lead single from Chicane's fifth studio album Thousand Mile Stare.

== Music video ==
A music video to accompany the release of "Going Deep" was first released onto YouTube on 8 July 2011 at a total length of three minutes and twenty-four seconds.

== Track listing ==
"Going Deep" single track listing
No.	Title	Length
1.	"Going Deep" (radio edit)	3:04
2.	"Going Deep" (club mix)	7:12
3.	"Going Deep" (Dub)	6:44
4.	"Going Deep" (Steeve Smart & Westfunk Remix)	5:03
5.	"Going Deep" (Steeve Smart & Westfunk Remix Radio Edit)	3:02
6.	"Going Deep" (VillaNaranjos Remix)	10:12

== Chart performance ==
Chart performance for "Going Deep"
Chart (2011)	Peak position
UK Indie (OCC)	37

== Release history ==
Release history and formats for "Going Deep"
Country	Release date	Format(s)
United Kingdom	14 April 2011	Digital download
