= Somersault (Chicane album) =

Album by Chicane

Studio album by Chicane
- Released: 23 July 2007
- Genres: Pop, dance
- Length: 42:13
- Label: Modena
- Producers: Nick Bracegirdle; Richard Searle; Ray Hedges; Nigel Butler; Steve Osborne

Chicane chronology
| Easy to Assemble (2003) | Somersault (2007) | The Best of Chicane: 1996–2008 (2008) |

Singles from Somersault
- 1. "Stoned in Love" Released: 17 April 2006; 2. "Come Tomorrow" Released: 16 July 2007

Somersault is the third studio album by British electronic music artist Chicane, released on 23 July 2007. It is Chicane's first album to be self-released on his record label, Modena Records.

== History ==
"Stoned in Love", the first officially released song from Somersault, was first heard as a single in April 2006, at which time little was known about the then-untitled album. Several other songs that were to appear on the album were first played live by Chicane in concerts during the same month; one of these songs, "Come Tomorrow", was announced as the follow-up single at this time. It was released on July 16, 2007.

In February 2007, Chicane's official website announced his departure from Universal Records, the label that released "Stoned in Love", and the subsequent scheduled release of "Come Tomorrow" and the forthcoming album on Modena; the title Somersault was subsequently announced in March.

Two of the tracks on the album, "Arizona" and "Spirit", are taken from the Easy to Assemble album, which was never officially released after it was widely pirated. Fifty review copies were sent out before the record label WEA changed hands leading to the departure of the A&R manager and music director who had signed him, and its release was put on hold while Bracegirdle negotiated an exit from his contract. The album was subsequently uploaded to a peer-to-peer site and pirated by Russian criminals to such an extent that it was felt that it was not worth releasing it officially. He self-financed Somersault, raising almost £400,000 by selling his Ferrari and remortgaging his house, and when it was released he employed the company Web Sheriff to monitor and close down sites that were distributing the album illegally.

== Reception ==
Professional ratings
Review scores
| Source | Rating |
|---|---|
| BBC | neutral |
| Birmingham Mail | neutral |
| Daily Record | favourable |
| Evening Standard | favourable |
| Mansized | 2/5 stars |
| Q | 1/5 stars |

Somersault received mixed reviews from most music critics. Q magazine gave Somersault one star out of five in its August 2007 issue, criticizing it for being "old-fashioned" in both "house" tracks such as "Always" and "Time of Your Life" and "indie-dance" tracks such as "Come Tomorrow"—which was nevertheless recommended as a download. Virgin Media's album review gave the same rating, also citing a lack of innovation, though it is suggested that those of the "Ibiza crowd" could appreciate it. UK fanzine High Voltage offered a rating of three out of five, with similar critique: "Bracegirdle's stubborn, yet kind of heroic refusal to divert from his initial blueprint has seen him become a dinosaur." It also goes on to suggest that the album's "purity" will continue to gain favour with "its demographic"—in reference to nightclub goers. Entertainment guide IndieLondon, however, expressed skepticism that the album would stand out to clubbers, cautioning that it "could just as easily alienate [Bracegirdle's] fans", using "Come Tomorrow", "Nothing", and "Arizona" as examples of songs that attempt to vary from the Ibiza sound but do not fully transcend to new genres. Other reviews were generally unenthusiastic about the album, although the Daily Record was more favourable, describing it as a "summertastic album, perfect for iPod listening during days of recovery on the beach". The Daily Express noted the shift in style towards more song-based tracks, comparing the structures of the songs to Coldplay and Keane, while adding "This album might veer towards the middle of the road, but it's technically flawless." The Evening Standard while giving it a favourable review, nevertheless stated "It's all good stuff, really just don't expect much by way of originality".

== Personnel ==
In addition to "Stoned in Love", five other songs feature leading male vocals and verse-chorus form lyrics. The singer on these songs (3, 4, 7, 8, 9) is (pseudonym) Jack Starks (whereas no previous album has included multiple songs with the same singer).

== Track listing ==
| No. | Title | Writer(s) | Producer(s) | Length |
|---|---|---|---|---|
| 1. | "Stoned in Love" (featuring Tom Jones) | Nick Bracegirdle, Ray Hedges, Nigel Butler, John Pickering, Tom Jones | Chicane, Hedges^{[a]}, Steve Osborne^{[a]} | 5:02 |
| 2. | "U R Always" | Bracegirdle, Hedges, Butler, Ernesto Lecuona, Kim Gannon | Chicane, Richard Searle^{[a]}, Hedges^{[a]}, Butler^{[a]} | 5:25 |
| 3. | "Come Tomorrow" | Bracegirdle | Chicane, Searle^{[a]} | 4:47 |
| 4. | "Nothing" | Bracegirdle | Chicane, Searle^{[a]} | 4:09 |
| 5. | "Arizona Pt 2" | Bracegirdle | Chicane | 3:01 |
| 6. | "Spirit" (featuring Jewel) | Bracegirdle, Tracy Ackerman | Chicane | 4:38 |
| 7. | "Turning Corners" | Bracegirdle | Chicane, Searle^{[a]} | 3:58 |
| 8. | "Far Away from You" | Bracegirdle, Humphrey Miles | Chicane | 3:48 |
| 9. | "Way I'm Feelin'" | Bracegirdle, Hedges, Butler | Chicane, Searle^{[a]} | 4:52 |
| 10. | "Time of Your Life" | Bracegirdle | Chicane | 2:33 |

Notes

- ^a signifies a co-producer
- "U R Always" is credited to Cuban composer Ernesto Lecuona and American lyricist James "Kim" Gannon due to its incorporation of a vocal performance of the song "Always in My Heart". (Previously, the English band Bent made similar use of the song in their 2000 single, "Always".)

== Charts ==
Chart performance for Somersault
| Chart (2007) | Peak position |
|---|---|
| UK Album Downloads (Official Charts Company) | 45 |
| UK Dance Albums (Official Charts Company) | 10 |
