= Thousand Mile Stare =

Studio album by Chicane
- Released: 16 April 2012
- Recorded: 2011–2012
- Genre: Trance; house; electronica; Chill-out; ambient
- Length: 66:46
- Label: Modena; Armada
- Producer: Chicane; Richard Searle; Nick Muir

Chicane chronology
Giants (2010)	Thousand Mile Stare (2012)	The Sum of Its Parts (2015)

Singles from Thousand Mile Stare
- 1. "Going Deep" Released: 14 August 2011; 2. "Three" Released: 10 June 2012

Professional ratings
Review scores
Source	Rating
AllMusic	3/5 stars
Electronic Night Life	9/10
'inthemix'	10/10
NU.nl	3/5 stars
Partyflock	75/100

Thousand Mile Stare is the fifth studio album by British electronic music artist Chicane. An exclusive 'Collectors Edition Box Set' version of the album was released on 12 December 2011 before any regular CD or digital version was announced. The boxed set was made available to preorder by 18 November 2011. Those who purchased the boxed set had their name included on the back panel of the booklet. The regular version of the album, containing three previously unreleased tracks, was released on 16 April 2012 by Modena.

The album's cover artwork pays homage to Jean Michel Jarre's Les Chants Magnétiques.

== Track listings ==
=== Standard version ===
No.	Title	Writer(s)	Producer(s)	Length
1.	"Hljóp" (with Vigri)	Nick Bracegirdle, Hans Pjetursson	Chicane, Richard Searle	5:12
2.	"The Nothing Song"	Sigur Rós	Chicane	6:16
3.	"Windbreaks" (vocals by Tracy Ackerman)	Bracegirdle, Searle	Chicane, Searle	5:12
4.	"Thousand Mile Stare"	Bracegirdle, Searle	Chicane, Searle	7:01
5.	"Playing Fields" (featuring Kate Walsh)	Bracegirdle, Kate Walsh	Chicane	5:22
6.	"Sólarupprás" (with Vigri)	Bracegirdle, Pjetursson	Chicane, Searle	4:46
7.	"Going Deep" (Moogmonkey Rework Mix)	Bracegirdle, Searle	Chicane, Searle	7:35
8.	"Goldfish" (vocals by Joseph Aquilina)	Bracegirdle	Chicane	3:41
9.	"Flotsum and Jetsum"	Bracegirdle, Nick Muir	Chicane, Muir	6:38
10.	"Super Mouflon" (vocals by Joseph Aquilina)	Nick Bracegirdle	Chicane	5:00
11.	"Going Deep" (Original Mix; vocals by Aggi Dukes)	Bracegirdle, Searle, Aggi Dukes	Chicane, Searle	7:12
12.	"Fin de Jours" (vocals by Tracey Ackerman)	Bracegirdle; Searle	Chicane, Searle	2:52

iTunes Store deluxe edition
No.	Title	Writer(s)	Length
13.	"Three (Original Mix)" (feat. Vigri)	Nick Bracegirdle; Bjarki Pjetursson; Hans Pjetursson; Atli Jónasson; Þórir Bergson; Egill Halldórsson	5:29
14.	"Sólarupprás (Disco Citizens Remix)" (feat. Vigri)	Nick Bracegirdle; Bjarki Pjetursson; Hans Pjetursson; Atli Jónasson; Þórir Bergson; Egill Halldórsson	5:40
15.	"Mission Impossible"	Lalo Schifrin	2:39
16.	"Three (Club Mix)" (feat. Vigri)	Nick Bracegirdle; Bjarki Pjetursson; Hans Pjetursson; Atli Jónasson; Þórir Bergson; Egill Halldórsson	6:36
17.	"Sólarupprás (Instrumental)" (feat. Vigri)	Nick Bracegirdle; Bjarki Pjetursson; Hans Pjetursson; Atli Jónasson; Þórir Bergson; Egill Halldórsson	4:43
18.	"Going Deep" (feat. Aggi Dukes, music video)		3:22
19.	"Hiding All the Stars" (feat. Natasha Andrews, music video)		3:49
20.	"Middledistancerunner" (feat. Adam Young, music video)		3:45
21.	"Come Back" (music video)		3:48

=== The Collectors Edition Box Set ===
Thousand Mile Stare CD album
No.	Title	Writer(s)	Length
1.	"Windbreaks" (feat. Tracey Ackerman)	Nick Bracegirdle; Richard Searle	5:14
2.	"Thousand Mile Stare" (feat. Sian Evans)	Nick Bracegirdle; Richard Searle; Sian Evans	8:19
3.	"Playing Fields" (feat. Kate Walsh)	Nick Bracegirdle; Kate Walsh	5:25
4.	"Going Deep (Moogmonkey Remix)"	Nick Bracegirdle; Richard Searle	7:38
5.	"Goldfish" (feat. Joseph Aquilina)	Nick Bracegirdle	3:43
6.	"Flotsum & Jetsum"	Nick Bracegirdle; Nicholas David Mack Muir	6:41
7.	"Super Mouflon" (feat. Joseph Aquilina)	Nick Bracegirdle	5:02
8.	"Going Deep (Original Mix)" (feat. Aggi Dukes)	Nick Bracegirdle; Richard Searle; Aggi Dukes	7:15
9.	"Fin de Jours" (feat. Tracey Ackerman)	Nick Bracegirdle; Richard Searle	2:53

Demo USB cassette
No.	Title	Writer(s)	Length
1.	"What Am I Doing Here (Part I) (Early Demo Male Vox)"	Nick Bracegirdle; James Hockley; Ray Hedges; Nigel Butler	3:43
2.	"Santanas"		6:07
3.	"Where Do I Start (Rough Demo)"	Nick Bracegirdle; Ray Hedges; Nigel Butler	3:34
4.	"Jumbo"		3:37
5.	"Playing Fields (Beatless Demo)" (feat. Kate Walsh)	Nick Bracegirdle; Kate Walsh	3:17
6.	"Stoned/Hybrid (Acoustic Idea)"		1:24
7.	"La Luna" (Translation "The Moon")		3:02
8.	"The Bee"		1:35
9.	"Flyover"		8:33
10.	"1000 Mile (Initial Sketch)"		2:06
11.	"1000 Mile (Alternate Melody)"		3:07
12.	"Offshore (Live Intro Demo)"	Nick Bracegirdle; Leo Elstob	3:39
13.	"MoJavé"		8:56

All Mixed Up: Remixes CD
No.	Title	Writer(s)	Length
1.	"Offshore (Man Called Adam Remix)"	Nick Bracegirdle; Leo Elstob	9:06
2.	"What Am I Doing Here Prt I (McAuley & Walsh Remix)"	Nick Bracegirdle; James Hockley; Ray Hedges; Nigel Butler	8:46
3.	"Hiding All the Stars (Michael Woods Remix)"	Nick Bracegirdle; James Hockley; Gary Numan	7:10
4.	"Locking Down (Dum Dum Project Remix)" (feat. The 1Shanti)	Nick Bracegirdle; Tracey Ackerman	4:16
5.	"Bruised Water (Adam K & Soha Dub)"	Nick Bracegirdle; Natasha Bedingfield; Ciarán Ó Braonáin; Pól Ó Braonáin; Ray Hedges; Paul Herman; Andrew Marcus Frampton; Wayne Wilkins	6:07
6.	"Come Tomorrow (Soul Seekerz Dirty Dub)"	Nick Bracegirdle	7:18
7.	"Autumn Tactics (Thrillseekers Remix)"	Nick Bracegirdle; Ray Hedges	7:25
8.	"Come Back (ShockOne Remix)" (feat. Paul Young)	Jack Lee	6:49
9.	"Where Do I Start (Armin van Buuren Remix)"	Nick Bracegirdle; Ray Hedges; Nigel Butler	7:04
10.	"Poppiholla (Freakazoid Remix)"	Jón Þór Birgisson; Orri Páll Dýrason; Georg Hólm; Kjartan Sveinsson	6:45
11.	"Locking Down (Niraj Remix)" (feat. Teymour Housego)	Nick Bracegirdle; Tracey Ackerman	4:37

== Charts ==
Chart (2012)	Peak position
UK Albums (OCC)	37
UK Album Downloads (OCC)	18
UK Dance Albums (OCC)	2
UK Independent Albums (OCC)	6
