= Middledistancerunner =

Single by Chicane featuring Adam Young

from the album Giants
- Released: 30 July 2010
- Genre: Trance
- Length: 5:52
- Label: Modena
- Songwriter(s): Nick Bracegirdle; James Hockley

Chicane singles chronology
"Come Back" (2010)	"Middledistancerunner" (2010)	"Where Do I Start" (2010)

Adam Young singles chronology
"Umbrella Beach" (2010)	"Middledistancerunner" (2010)	"To the Sky" (2010)

"Middledistancerunner" is the second official single taken from the 2010 Chicane album Giants. It features American musician and vocalist Adam Young of Owl City. The single was digitally released 30 July 2010.

== Music video ==
The music video for "Middledistancerunner" was released on 3 August 2010. It has been made to accompany the DC Rework Edit of the song.

== Track listing ==
Digital download
No.	Title	Length
1.	"Middledistancerunner" (radio edit)	3:27
2.	"Middledistancerunner" (Disco Citizens Rework Edit)	3:51
3.	"Middledistancerunner" (Disco Citizens Rework Mix)	6:37
4.	"Middledistancerunner" (Album Mix)	5:52
5.	"Middledistancerunner" (Mihell & Pinkfinger Remix)	7:30

== Charts ==
Chart performance for "Middledistancerunner"
Chart (2010)	Peak position
UK Singles (OCC)	173
UK Dance (OCC)	26
