= Hiding All the Stars =

Single by Chicane feat. Natasha Andrews

from the album Giants
- Released: 18 October 2009
- Genre: Trance
- Length: 5:43
- Label: Modena
- Songwriter(s): Gary Numan; Nick Bracegirdle

Chicane singles chronology
"Poppiholla" (2009)	"Hiding All the Stars" (2009)	"Come Back" (2010)

"Hiding All the Stars" is a song by British electronic dance music artist Chicane featuring vocals by Natasha Andrews. The song, which samples "Cars" by Gary Numan, was released on 18 October 2009 in the United Kingdom.

"Hiding All the Stars" entered the UK Singles Chart on 25 October 2009 at number forty-two. It dropped to number ninety-eight by the second week. The song peaked at number twenty-three in Belgium (Flanders).

== Track listing ==
- UK digital download
1. "Hiding All the Stars" (Radio Edit) – 3:30
2. "Hiding All the Stars" (Club Mix) – 07:41
3. "Hiding All the Stars" (Justin Fry Remix) – 05:53
- Dutch digital download
1. "Hiding All the Stars" (Radio Edit) - 03:03
2. "Hiding All the Stars" (Club Mix) - 07:41
3. "Hiding All the Stars" (Michael Woods Remix) - 07:08
4. "Hiding All the Stars" (Justin Fry Remix) - 05:53

== Charts ==
Chart performance for "Hiding All the Stars"
Chart (2009)	Peak position
Belgium (Ultratop 50 Flanders)	23
UK Singles (OCC)	42

== Release history ==
Release history and formats for "Hiding All the Stars"
Region	Date	Format	Label
United Kingdom	18 October 2009	Digital download	Modena Records
United Kingdom	Cancelled	CD single	Modena Records
Netherlands	15 March 2009	Digital download	Armada Music
