= Far from the Maddening Crowds =

Studio album by Chicane
- Released: 20 October 1997
- Recorded: 1996–97
- Studios: Modena One, United Kingdom
- Genres: Trance; ambient; downtempo
- Length: 70:15
- Labels: Xtravaganza; Edel
- Producers: Nick Bracegirdle; Leo Elstob; Salt Tank; Alex Gold (exec.)

Chicane chronology
Far from the Maddening Crowds (1997)	Behind the Sun (2000)

Singles from Far from the Maddening Crowds
- 1. "Offshore" Released: 2 December 1996; 2. "Sunstroke" Released: 2 June 1997; 3. "Offshore '97" Released: 1 September 1997; 4. "Lost You Somewhere" Released: 8 December 1997; 5. "Red Skies" Released: 1998

Alternative cover
- 2007 edition

Far from the Maddening Crowds is the debut studio album by British electronic music artist Chicane, released on 20 October 1997 through Xtravaganza Recordings. It is highly regarded as a seminal release in the trance music community, and was highly sought after, having been shelved for licensing issues, until its re-release on 18 October 2007. The album includes Chicane's debut single, "Offshore", as well as other singles "Sunstroke", "Lost You Somewhere" and "Red Skies". The album charted in the UK on release, peaking at number 49.

== Background ==
Chicane was originally formed as an electronic music duo under the name Disco Citizens, comprising Nick Bracegirdle and Leo Elstob. The duo released their debut single, "Right Here, Right Now", in 1995 through Deconstruction Records to success, with the song reaching number 40 in the UK Singles Chart. Chicane was intended as a side project of the act, however they only saw one release as a duo, the Offshore EP through Cyanide Records. After "Offshore"'s release as a single in 1996, the song quickly garnered success, debuting at number 1 on the UK Dance Singles Chart. After this Elstob left the duo, and Chicane (and Disco Citizens) became the solo moniker of Nick Bracegirdle. He soon signed to Alex Gold's record label, Xtravaganza Recordings, who showed interest in releasing a full album by Chicane.

== Release ==
"Offshore", the earliest song produced and released, is also among the best-known of Chicane's tracks; aside from single sales and being a major dance club hit, resulting on its inclusion on what has been said to be over 130 compilation albums. It has also been featured in the UK on TV programs ranging from travel reviews to the BBC's Gardener's World and Grandstand.

The album was released on 20 October 1997 through Xtravaganza recordings, with singles "Offshore", "Sunstroke" on 2 June 1997, and "Lost You Somewhere" on 8 December 1997. A vocal edit of "Offshore", titled "Offshore '97", was mixed by Anthony Pappa and credited as a collaboration with Power Circle. It was released as a single on 1 September 1997 and was featured on the album. A Benelux single release of "Red Skies" was also issued in 1998. After its release, the album appeared on the UK Albums Chart for one week, reaching number 49. In 2007, after its re-release, the album appeared on the UK Dance Albums Chart for one week, peaking at number 36. On 8 September 2023, over 25 years since its original release, the album was certified silver in the UK by BPI, selling over 60,000 copies.

== Critical reception ==
Professional ratings
Review scores
Source	Rating
AllMusic	4/5 stars
Montreal Mirror	7.5/10
Music Week	5/5 stars
TranceCritic.com	5/5 stars

Far from the Maddening Crowds received positive reviews from critics upon and after its release. Stephen Thomas Erlewine from Allmusic reviewed the album in 1997, and praised its variety, writing that "Chicane has mastered not only house-styled thumpers, but also spacious, near-ambient soundscapes". He summarised the review describing the album as "cinematic" and "a successful debut", rating it four stars out of five. Will Alexander from Trance Critic reviewed the album in 2007, summarising it with "Far from the Maddening Crowds is still as relevant and inspiring as the day it was created", and rated it five stars out of five.

== Track listing ==
No.	Title	Writer(s)	Producer(s)	Length
1.	"Early"	Nick Bracegirdle	Bracegirdle	4:17
2.	"Already There"	Bracegirdle	Bracegirdle	2:55
3.	"Offshore" (Original)	Bracegirdle; Leo Elstob	Bracegirdle; Elstob	6:45
4.	"Lost You Somewhere"	Bracegirdle; Caroline Lavelle	Bracegirdle	8:26
5.	"From Blue to Green"	Bracegirdle	Bracegirdle	5:51
6.	"Sunstroke" (Disco Citizens)	Bracegirdle	Bracegirdle	9:06
7.	"Leaving Town" (featuring Salt Tank)	Bracegirdle; David Gates; Malcolm Stanners	Bracegirdle; Salt Tank	5:58
8.	"Red Skies"	Bracegirdle	Bracegirdle	7:35
9.	"Sunstroke" (Original)	Bracegirdle	Bracegirdle	6:18
10.	"Offshore '97" (with Power Circle)	Bracegirdle; Elstob; Richie Sullivan; Graham Dear; Louise Burton	Bracegirdle	9:12
11.	"The Drive Home"	Bracegirdle	Bracegirdle	6:06
Total length:				70:15

2007 edition bonus track
No.	Title	Writer(s)	Producer(s)	Length
12.	"Offshore 2007"	Bracegirdle; Elstob; Richie Sullivan; Graham Dear; Louise Burton	Bracegirdle	7:51

== Personnel ==
Adapted from liner notes

- Nick Bracegirdle – songwriting, production
- Leo Elstob – songwriting on "Offshore" and "Offshore '97", production on "Offshore"
- Caroline Lavelle – songwriting and vocals on "Lost You Somewhere"
- Salt Tank – songwriting and production on "Leaving Town"
- Luce Drayton – vocals on "Sunstroke"
- Richie Sullivan – songwriting on "Offshore '97"
- Graham Dear – songwriting on "Offshore '97"
- Louise Burton – songwriting on "Offshore '97"
- Anthony Pappa – mixing on "Offshore '97"
- Walter Coelho – mastering
- Alex Gold – executive producer

== Charts ==
Chart (1997–2007)	Peak position
UK Albums Chart (OCC)	49
UK Dance Albums Chart (OCC)	36

== Certifications ==
Certifications for Far from the Maddening Crowds
Region	Certification	Certified units/sales
United Kingdom (BPI)	Silver	60,000^{‡}
^{‡} Sales+streaming figures based on certification alone.
