= Anthony Pappa =

Australian DJ and music producer

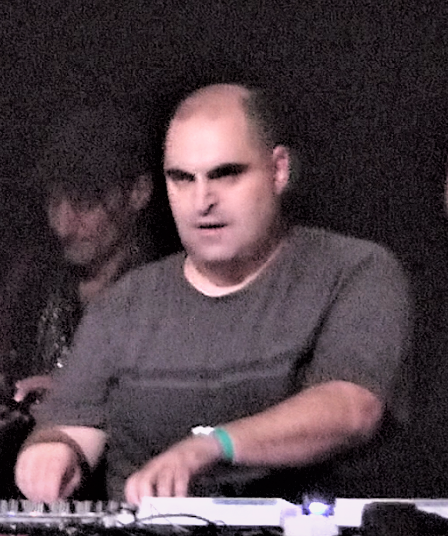
- Anthony Pappa in 2017

Background information
- Born: Anthony Pappalardo; 15 November 1973 (age 52); Italy
- Genres: Trance; tech house; progressive house
- Occupations: DJ, electronic musician, composer, record label owner
- Labels: Red Light District; Platipus Records

Anthony Pappa (born 15 November 1973) is an Australian DJ and electronic music producer from Melbourne.

== Early life ==
Pappa was born in Italy but was raised in Melbourne, Australia where he attended Marcellin College. At the age of four he got his first drum which inspired him to become a producer later in life.

== Career ==
Pappa started DJ career at the age of 13. He won Australia's DMC DJ championship at the age of 15, and by the age of 21 was playing for most prolific clubs. After meeting Sasha and John Digweed during an Australian tour, he decided to move to Great Britain to further pursue a DJ career.

He appeared on the List of DJ Magazine's Top 100 DJs each year between 1997 and 2003. Pappa played at the I Love Techno music festival in France. In 2008, he played at the SAMC (South American Music Conference). In 2000, he was on the cover of DJ Mag.

He has released mix compilations on labels including Platipus Records, System Recordings, EQ's Balance, and most notably on Boxed's Renaissance Recordings, Global Underground and NuBreed series. He also did mixes for the Nina Kraviz’s song "I’m Gonna Get You", before founding his own music label Red Light District in 2008.

In 1998, Pappa teamed up with Alan Bremner under the name Freefall to produce the one off trance classic "Skydive", featuring Jan Johnston on vocals. The song has since been remixed more than ten times. He has also remixed tracks for Chicane including a bootleg of Offshore that was officially released and charted at #17 in the UK.

During the 2004 tour, Pappa performed at Womb nightclub in Tokyo, Japan and then performed at Zouk in Kuala Lumpur. He also performed at the various clubs in Beijing, Taipei, Hong Kong and Singapore.

In 2018 he teamed up with Gab Oliver of Narcotik, as well as working on a new single with Quivver.

In 2019, Pappa performed at the Circus Paradise Arts and Music Festival and on 30 March of the same year, he played at LaDiDa.

== See also ==
- List of house music artists
