= The Place You Can't Remember, the Place You Can't Forget =

Studio album by Chicane
- Released: 8 June 2018
- Recorded: 2016–2018
- Length: 51:22
- Label: Modena; Armada
- Producer: Chicane

Chicane chronology
Twenty (2016)	The Place You Can't Remember, the Place You Can't Forget (2018)	Everything We Had to Leave Behind (2021)

Singles from The Place You Can't Remember, the Place You Can't Forget
- 1. "Gorecki" Released: 24 November 2017; 2. "Serendipity" Released: 4 May 2018; 3. "A Love That's Hard to Find" Released: 25 May 2018; 4. "Nirvana" Released: 5 October 2018

The Place You Can't Remember, the Place You Can't Forget is the seventh studio album by British electronic music artist Chicane. The album was officially announced on 4 May 2018, along with the release of the second single from the album "Serendipity". It was released on 8 June 2018 by Modena Records and Armada Music.

== Track listing ==
The Place You Can't Remember, the Place You Can't Forget track listing
No.	Title	Writer(s)	Length
1.	"Running to the Sea" (featuring Paul Aiden)	Nick Bracegirdle, Richard Searle	4:59
2.	"Gorecki" (featuring Hannah Robinson)	Lou Rhodes, Andy Barlow, Bracegirdle	6:22
3.	"Serendipity" (featuring Tracy Ackerman)	Bracegirdle, Searle, Ackerman	4:48
4.	"A Love That's Hard to Find" (featuring Paul Aiden)	Bracegirdle, Searle, Maurizio Colella, Christian Beat Hirt	3:46
5.	"Chord-less Yacht"	Bracegirdle, Searle	4:23
6.	"Rainbow" (featuring Tyler Lyle)	Bracegirdle, Searle, Tyler Lyle	4:49
7.	"Nirvana" (featuring Rosalee O'Connell)	B. Campbell, Danielle Draizin, Phil Shaouy, Max Farrar	3:17
8.	"Judder"	Bracegirdle, Searle	4:08
9.	"I Came Here for You" (featuring Rosalee O'Connell)	Bracegirdle, Searle	4:53
10.	"Ten Deep"	Bracegirdle, Searle	4:40
11.	"Fear I Must First Let You Go" (featuring Chris James)	Bracegirdle, Searle, C. James	5:17
Total length:			51:22

== Charts ==
Chart performance for The Place You Can't Remember, the Place You Can't Forget
Chart (2018)	Peak position
UK Dance Albums (OCC)	3
