= The Sum of Its Parts =

Studio album by Chicane
- Released: 26 January 2015
- Recorded: 2012–2014
- Genres: Trance; house; electronica; ambient
- Labels: Modena; Armada
- Producers: Chicane; Richard Searle; Ferry Corsten

Chicane chronology
Thousand Mile Stare (2012)	The Sum of Its Parts (2015)	Twenty (2016)

Singles from The Sum of Its Parts
- 1. "One Thousand Suns" Released: 21 April 2013; 2. "One More Time" Released: 13 October 2013; 3. "No More I Sleep" Released: 25 May 2014; 4. "Still With Me" Released: 26 October 2014; 5. "Oxygen" Released: 3 July 2015; 6. "Fibreglasses" Released: 30 October 2015

Professional ratings
Review scores
Source	Rating
AllMusic	3.5/5 stars
The Irish Times	3/5 stars

(The Whole is Greater Than) The Sum of Its Parts is the sixth studio album by British electronic music artist Chicane. It was released on 26 January 2015 by Modena Records and Armada Music.

The album debuted at number 44 on the UK Albums Chart, selling 1,987 copies in its first week.

== Background ==
On 28 July 2014, Bracegirdle announced that the title of his then-upcoming sixth studio album would be (The Whole is Greater than) The Sum of Its Parts on the ninth volume of his monthly radio podcast show Chicane Presents Sun:Sets on 28 July 2014. The title directly refers to a quote recorded by Greek philosopher, Aristotle.

The album received moderate reviews upon release, with The Irish Times garnering it 3 stars out of 5, claiming "it’s precisely what you might expect from a Chicane album".

== Track listing ==
No.	Title	Writer(s)	Producer(s)	Length
1.	"Église"	Nick Bracegirdle, Richard Searle	Chicane, Searle	4:35
2.	"38 Weeks" (with Ferry Corsten featuring Lisa Gerrard; extended album mix)	Bracegirdle, Ferry Corsten, Searle, Lisa Gerrard	Chicane, Searle, Corsten	5:34
3.	"Oxygen" (featuring Paul Aiden; album mix)	Bracegirdle, Searle, Paul Aiden	Chicane, Searle	6:26
4.	"One Thousand Suns (Soundprank extended vocal mix)" (with Ferry Corsten featuring Christian Burns)	Bracegirdle, Corsten, Christian Burns	Chicane, Corsten, Soundprank (remix)	5:08
5.	"Tuesdays" (featuring City Lies and Manu Zain)	Bracegirdle, Searle, City Lies, Manu Zain	Chicane, Searle	5:30
6.	"Still with Me" (featuring Bo Bruce; Disco Citizens mix)	David Reed, Cristina Soto, Chad Cisneros	Chicane, Searle	6:47
7.	"One More Time" (featuring Duane Harden; album mix)	Bracegirdle, Searle, Duane Harden	Chicane	5:17
8.	"Fibreglasses"	Bracegirdle, Searle	Chicane, Searle	6:14
9.	"Orleans" (featuring Lisa Gerrard)	Bracegirdle, Searle, Gerrard	Chicane, Searle	4:20
10.	"Motion" (featuring Paul Aiden)	Bracegirdle, Searle, Aiden	Chicane, Searle	5:30
11.	"No More I Sleep" (featuring Senadee; Disco Citizens Rockin' album mix)	Bracegirdle, Searle, Senadee	Chicane, Searle	4:42
12.	"Photograph" (featuring Christian Burns)	Bracegirdle, Burns, Victoria Horn	Chicane, Searle	3:30

== Charts ==
Chart (2015)	Peak position
Dutch Albums (Album Top 100)	36
UK Albums (Official Charts)	44
