= Offshore (song) =

1996 single by Chicane

Single by Chicane

from the album Far from the Maddening Crowds
- B-side: "Disco Citizens Remix"
- Released: 9 December 1996
- Studio: Modena One (United Kingdom)
- Genre: Trance; breakbeat
- Length: 6:58 (original): 9:23 (Disco Citizens remix)
- Label: Xtravaganza
- Songwriters: Nick Bracegirdle; Leo Elstob
- Producers: Nick Bracegirdle; Leo Elstob

Chicane singles chronology
"Offshore" (1996)	"Sunstroke" (1997)

Alternative cover
- 2012 re-release cover

"Offshore" is a song by English electronic music producer Chicane, released on 9 December 1996 by label Xtravaganza as the lead single from his debut album, Far from the Maddening Crowds (1997). The song reached number five in the United States on Billboard's Dance Club Play chart, number 12 in Ireland and number 14 in the United Kingdom. A bootleg by Australian DJ Anthony Pappa was given an official release in 1997 titled "Offshore '97". This version peaked at number 17 in the UK.

"Offshore" is a lush, multi-layered, early trance track, the original of which features sweeping synth chords and a reflective balearic theme, elements of which are reminiscent of the Tangerine Dream track, "Love on a Real Train". The main synth-hook which gives "Offshore" its uplifting breakdown however is based on Don Henley's 1985 hit, "The Boys of Summer".

== Critical reception ==
A reviewer from Music Week described "Offshore" as "dream house with real excitement." Brad Beatnik from the RM Dance Update praised the track and rated it five out of five, writing, "A monstrously huge trancey house tune, this one goes on for ever, coasting on waves of lush sounds. [...] The original is the sort of dreamy track Jose Padilla would kill to include on his Cafe Del Mar albums. An absolute stunner." David Sinclair from The Times said, "Eerie techno track you can dance and chill to simultaneously."

== Music video ==
The accompanying music video for "Offshore" was directed by Julien Berton.

== Impact and legacy ==
In 2018, Mixmag ranked 'Offshore' among "The 15 Best Mid-90s Trance Tracks", noting that it was "providing some much needed respite from England's summer heartbreak at the European Championships. The producer has proven to be a deft hand at crafting trance anthems and 'Offshore' is a prime example. The best bit occurs when the urgent 4x4 beat flows into soft breaks, a technique he also deploys in his 1999 corker 'Saltwater'."

== Track listings ==
- European CD single
1. "Offshore" (Disco Citizens Edit) – 4:27
2. "Offshore" (Original Version) – 6:58
3. "Offshore" (Disco Citizens Remix) – 9:23
- German CD single
1. "Offshore" (Radio Edit) – 3:07
2. "Offshore" (Original Version) – 6:58
3. "Offshore" (Disco Citizens Remix) – 9:23
4. "Offshore" (Disco Citizens Edit) – 4:27

== Charts ==
=== Weekly charts ===
Chart (1996–1997)	Peak position
Europe (Eurochart Hot 100)	68
Germany (GfK)	34
Ireland (IRMA)	12
Israel (Israeli Singles Chart)	22
Italy (Musica e dischi)	25
Netherlands (Dutch Top 40)	28
Netherlands (Single Top 100)	42
Scottish Singles Sales (Official Charts)	13
Switzerland (Schweizer Hitparade)	41
UK Singles (Official Charts)	14
UK Dance (Official Charts)	1
US Dance Club Songs (Billboard)	5

=== Year-end charts ===
Chart (1996)	Position
UK Club Chart (Music Week)	43

== Certifications ==
Region	Certification	Certified units/sales
United Kingdom (BPI)	Silver	200,000^{‡}
^{‡} Sales+streaming figures based on certification alone.

== "Offshore '97" ==
"Offshore '97"

Single by Chicane with Power Circle

from the album Far from the Maddening Crowds
- B-side: "Red Skies"
- Released: 1 September 1997
- Length: 3:52
- Label: Xtravaganza
- Songwriters: Nick Bracegirdle; Leo Elstob; Richard Sullivan; Graham Dear; Louise Burton

Chicane singles chronology
"Sunstroke" (1997)	"Offshore '97" (1997)	"Lost You Somewhere" (1997)

"Offshore" was re-released on 1 September 1997 as "Offshore '97". A bootleg was created by Australian DJ Anthony Pappa who made a mashup of "Offshore (Disco Citizens Mix)" with the vocals from the Power Circle song "A Little Love, a Little Life". Originally a bootleg (mixed by Dave Seaman on Renaissance: The Mix Collection Part 4) it was turned into an official release, credited to "Chicane with Power Circle". The song peaked at number 17 on the UK Singles Chart.

The vocalist was Louise Burton, wife of Daniel Mays. "Offshore '97 (Anthony Pappa Bootleg Mix)" also appeared on Far from the Maddening Crowds.

=== Track listings ===
- European CD single
1. Chicane with Power Circle – "Offshore '97" (Anthony Pappa Bootleg Mix) (R&D Edit) – 3:52
2. Chicane – "Red Skies" (Edit) (Nick Bracegirdle) – 7:36
3. Chicane – "Offshore" (Disco Citizens Edit) (Nick Bracegirdle) – 4:27
4. Chicane – "Offshore" (A Man Called Adam Remix) (Nick Bracegirdle) – 9:04
- UK 12-inch vinyl
1. Chicane – "Red Skies" (Original Mix)
2. Chicane With Power Circle – "Offshore '97" (Salt Tank Pacific Storm Edit)
3. Chicane With Power Circle – "Offshore '97" (Anthony Pappa Bootleg Mix)

=== Charts ===
==== Weekly charts ====
Chart (1997)	Peak position
Europe (Eurochart Hot 100)	40
Scottish Singles Sales (Official Charts)	12
UK Singles (Official Charts)	17
UK Dance (Official Charts)	3
UK Indie (Music Week)	1

==== Year-end charts ====
Chart (1997)	Position
UK Club Chart (Music Week)	76

== Armin van Buuren and AVIRA version ==
In 2022, Dutch DJ and record producer Armin van Buuren and Canadian producer AVIRA released a new version of "Offshore" with Chicane, credited as "Armin van Buuren & AVIRA vs. Chicane". The single was released on 13 May 2022 by Armind.

Armada Music described the version as a reimagining of one of Chicane's best-known classics, retaining the Balearic character of the 1996 original while updating it for a contemporary trance and progressive sound. A State of Trance also presented the release as a tribute to the legacy of the genre.

Nancy Gomez of EDMTunes wrote that the remake combined trance with deep melodic house and techno elements, while also noting AVIRA's progressive style and Chicane's beach-oriented sound. The track was also featured in A State of Trance 2022, mixed by van Buuren.

An official visualizer for the version was released on van Buuren's YouTube channel.

=== Track listing ===
- Digital download / streaming
1. "Offshore" – 3:19
2. "Offshore" (extended mix) – 6:30
