= Everything We Had to Leave Behind =

Studio album by Chicane
- Released: 23 April 2021
- Recorded: 2020–2021
- Length: 52:49
- Label: Modena; Armada
- Producer: Chicane

Chicane chronology
The Place You Can't Remember, the Place You Can't Forget (2018)	Everything We Had to Leave Behind (2021)

Singles from Everything We Had to Leave Behind
- 1. "Everything We Had to Leave Behind" Released: 6 November 2020; 2. "Never Look Back" Released: 4 December 2020; 3. "Make You Stay" Released: 15 January 2021; 4. "Hello, Goodbye" Released: 12 February 2021; 5. "8 (Circle)" Released: 26 February 2021; 6. "Don't Look Down" Released: 12 March 2021; 7. "1000 More Suns" Released: 26 March 2021; 8. "Sailing" Released: 9 April 2021; 9. "One Foot in the Past, One Foot in the Future" Released: 18 June 2021; 10. "An Ocean Apart" Released: 16 July 2021; 11. "Capricorn" Released: 13 August 2021; 12. "Now or Never" Released: 10 September 2021

Everything We Had to Leave Behind is the eighth studio album by British electronic music artist Chicane. The album was officially announced on 26 February 2021, along with the release of the fourth single from the album "8 (Circle)". It was released on 23 April 2021 by Modena Records and Armada Music.

The album is unique in that every track, apart from 'Juno', was released as a single.

== Track listing ==
Everything We Had to Leave Behind track listing
No.	Title	Length
1.	"Everything We Had to Leave Behind" (featuring Joseph Aquilina)	3:30
2.	"8 (Circle)"	3:20
3.	"Capricorn"	4:13
4.	"Never Look Back"	3:42
5.	"Sailing"	4:17
6.	"Don't Look Down"	3:21
7.	"One Foot in the Past, One Foot in the Future"	4:00
8.	"1000 More Suns" (featuring Joseph Aquilina)	4:24
9.	"Juno"	3:42
10.	"Make You Stay" (Original Mix)	3:20
11.	"Now or Never"	3:29
12.	"An Ocean Apart"	3:35
13.	"Make You Stay" (Back Pedal Brakes Extended Remix)	3:37
14.	"Hello, Goodbye"	4:19
Total length:		52:49

== Charts ==
Chart performance for Everything We Had to Leave Behind
Chart (2021)	Peak position
Scottish Albums (OCC)	37
UK Dance Albums (OCC)	1
UK Independent Albums (OCC)	10
