= Salt Tank =

English music group

Salt Tank are two English record producers, David Gates and Malcolm Stanners, plus percussionist and vocalist Andy Rose, from Basingstoke. Their music ranges from laid-back trance, such as their hit single "Eugina" (some of its many versions include a sample from "Me and a Gun" by Tori Amos) to tougher techno sounds.

== Biography ==
The trio recorded several singles before signing a recording contract with Internal Records and securing a UK Top 40 hit single with "Eugina". Their debut album, Science and Nature, was released on that label in 1996. They enjoyed a brief flirtation with the UK Singles Chart in May 1996 when "Eugina" peaked at No. 40. Other such chart entries included "Dimension" (1999, #52) and "Eugina" (remix) (2000, No. 58). By 1991, Stanners and Gates had also recorded three EPs on their own label, 4 Real Communications. The releases created an interest in the dance community, and reached radio via John Peel.

They have collaborated with other musicians such as Chicane, in the track "Leaving Town", which can be found in Chicane's album Far from the Maddening Crowds. In turn, Salt Tank had the song remixed by trance artist Mea Culpa and re-titled it, "Pueblo Blanco". It was issued on 1999's Gatecrasher : Wet.

Drummer/vocalist Andy Rose died in November 2012 following a fight with cancer. Prior to Salt Tank he was joint lead vocalist with UK indie rap band EB and the System. Later he became known as AR Logic.

== Discography ==
Albums

- 1996 ST 7: Science and Nature (Internal)
- 1997 Wavebreaks (FFRR)

Singles and EPs

- 1991 Ease the Pressure (self-released)
- 1992 Ethereal EP (self-released)
- 1993 ST 1 (self-released)
- 1993 ST 2 (self-released)
- 1994 ST 3 (Internal)
- 1994 ST 4: Laguna Calorado (Internal)
- 1995 ST 5: Peel Session (Internal)
- 1996 ST 6: "Eugina" (Internal)
- 1996 ST 8: Swell (Internal)
- 1997 "Wave Intruder" (FFRR)
- 1997 "Angels Landing" (FFRR)
- 1998 "Skyline" / "I Dream Of Jeanie" (self-released)
- 1999 "Dimension" (Hooj Choons)
- 1999 The White Island E.P. (Hooj Choons)
- 2000 "Eugina" (Lost Language)
- 2001 "Eugina (I Want To Be Free)" (Lost Language)
- 2001 "The Energy" (Bedrock Records)
- 2009 "L.e.d." (self-released)
- 2015 "Phoenix" (Pure Trance Recordings)
