= No Ordinary Morning / Halcyon =

2000 single by Chicane

"No Ordinary Morning" / "Halcyon"

Single by Chicane

from the album Behind the Sun
- Released: 10 July 2000
- Studio: Modena One and Mothership, UK
- Genre: Downtempo; trance
- Label: Xtravaganza
- Producer: Chicane

Chicane singles chronology
| "Don't Give Up" (2000) | ""No Ordinary Morning" / "Halcyon"" (2000) | "Autumn Tactics" (2000) |

"No Ordinary Morning" / "Halcyon" is a double A-side single by British electronic dance music artist Chicane. It was released as the third single from his second studio album, Behind the Sun on 10 July 2000. The single reached number twenty-eight on the UK Singles Chart.

"No Ordinary Morning" features the vocals of Tracy Ackerman and is co-written by Ray Hedges.

"Halcyon" refers to Halcyon, a genus of kingfishers (specifically, those of the Halcyonidae family) in scientific classification, as is evident by the opening moments of the song, where a kingfisher's call is heard before the tempo starts to pick up and the song begins.

On 6 October 2008, Chicane released the greatest hits album, The Best of Chicane: 1996–2008, which includes a reworked version of "Halcyon".

== Track listings ==
- Australia and Europe maxi CD single
1. "No Ordinary Morning" (Radio Edit) – 3:49
2. "Halcyon" (Original Mix) – 9:02
3. "Halcyon" (Airscape Remix) – 7:01
- Cassette single

Side A

1. "No Ordinary Morning" (7" Radio Edit) – 3:50
2. "Halcyon" (Original Mix) – 9:02

Side B

1. "No Ordinary Morning" (7" Radio Edit) – 3:50
2. "Halcyon" (Original Mix) – 9:02
- UK 12" vinyl

Side A

1. "No Ordinary Morning" (Original Mix)

Side B

1. "Halcyon" (Original Mix)

== Charts ==
Chart performance for "No Ordinary Morning" / "Halcyon"
| Chart (2000) | Peak position |
|---|---|
| Australia (ARIA) | 59 |
| Switzerland (Schweizer Hitparade) | 96 |
| UK Singles (Official Charts) | 28 |
| UK Dance (Official Charts) | 6 |
