= Giants (Chicane album) =

Studio album by Chicane
- Released: 2 August 2010
- Recorded: 2009–2010
- Genre: Trance; house; ambient
- Length: 68:22
- Label: Modena
- Producer: Nick Bracegirdle

Chicane chronology
The Best of Chicane: 1996–2008 (2008)	Giants (2010)	Thousand Mile Stare (2012)

Singles from Giants
- 1. "Poppiholla" Released: 13 July 2009; 2. "Hiding All the Stars" Released: 18 October 2009; 3. "Come Back" Released: 25 April 2010; 4. "Middledistancerunner" Released: 2 August 2010; 5. "Where Do I Start" Released: 14 November 2010

Professional ratings
Review scores
Source	Rating
AllMusic	4/5 stars
Future Entertainment	8/10
Random.Access	8.5/10
Skiddle	5/5 stars

Giants is the fourth studio album by British electronic musician Chicane. It was released in the United Kingdom on 2 August 2010. The album's first official single, "Middledistancerunner", featuring the vocals of Adam Young was released on the same day. The tracks "Poppiholla", "Hiding All the Stars" and "Come Back", which were supposed to be released on a Re-work EP in 2009, are also included on the album. The album debuted at No. 35 on the UK Albums Chart and at No. 2 on the UK Dance Albums Chart on 8 August 2010.

== Track listing ==
Giants track listing
No.	Title	Writer(s)	Length
1.	"Barefoot"	Bracegirdle, Hockley	6:04
2.	"Middledistancerunner" (featuring Adam Young of Owl City)	Bracegirdle, Hockley	5:52
3.	"Come Back" (featuring Paul Young)	Jack Lee	7:28
4.	"What Am I Doing Here? Pt. 1"	Bracegirdle, Hockley, Nigel Butler, Ray Hedges	3:45
5.	"Giants"	Bracegirdle, Hockley	7:01
6.	"Poppiholla (5am)"	Georg Hólm, Jón Þór Birgisson, Kjartan Sveinsson, Orri Páll Dýrason	5:06
7.	"So Far Out to Sea"	Bracegirdle, Hockley	5:37
8.	"Where Do I Start?"	Bracegirdle, Hockley, Hedges	4:31
9.	"From Where I Stand"	Bracegirdle, Hockley, Butler, Hedges	6:38
10.	"Hiding All the Stars"	Bracegirdle, Hockley, Gary Numan	5:43
11.	"What Am I Doing Here? Pt. 2" (featuring Lemar)	Bracegirdle, Hockley, Butler, Hedges	6:26
12.	"Titles"	Bracegirdle, Hockley	4:26
Total length:			68:22

CD bonus track
No.	Title	Writer(s)	Length
13.	"Middledistancerunner" (DC Rework Edit)	Bracegirdle, Hockley	3:53

== Personnel ==
- Adam Young – vocals on "Middledistancerunner"
- Paul Young – vocals on "Come Back"
- Blandine – vocals on "What Am I Doing Here (Part 1)" and "Where Do I Start"
- Tracy Ackerman – vocals on "So Far Out to Sea"
- Lucie Kay – vocals on "From Where I Stand"
- Kerry – additional vocals on "From Where I Stand"
- Natasha Andrews – vocals on "Hiding All the Stars"
- Lemar – vocals on "What Am I Doing Here (Part 2)"

== Charts ==
Chart performance for Giants
Chart (2010)	Peak position
UK Albums (OCC)	35
UK Dance Albums (OCC)	2
UK Independent Albums (OCC)	3

== Release history ==
Release history and formats for Giants
Region	Date	Label	Format
United Kingdom	1 August 2010	Modena Records	Digital download
United Kingdom	2 August 2010	Modena Records	CD
Netherlands	7 September 2010	Armada Music	CD
