= Behind the Sun (Chicane album) =

Studio album by Chicane
- Released: 27 March 2000
- Recorded: 1999–2000
- Studios: Modena One, Mothership Studios UK
- Genres: Electronic; trance; ambient
- Length: 66:21
- Labels: Xtravaganza; Armada
- Producers: Nick Bracegirdle; Ray Hedges; Martin Brannigan

Chicane chronology
| Far from the Maddening Crowds (1997) | Behind the Sun (2000) | Visions of Ibiza (2001) |

Singles from Behind the Sun
- 1. "Saltwater" Released: 24 May 1999; 2. "Don't Give Up" Released: 6 March 2000; 3. "No Ordinary Morning" / "Halcyon" Released: 10 July 2000; 4. "Autumn Tactics" Released: 16 October 2000

Behind the Sun is the second studio album by British electronic music artist Chicane. It was released on 27 March 2000 through Xtravaganza Recordings. The album features collaborations with Tracy Ackerman, Máire Brennan, Justine Suissa, and Bryan Adams, including its singles "Saltwater", "Don't Give Up", "No Ordinary Morning" / "Halcyon", and "Autumn Tactics". Upon release, it charted at number 10 in the United Kingdom, 7 in New Zealand, 15 in Australia, and was certified gold in the UK. The album is described by Chicane in the liner notes as a reflection on "a year in the life of Chicane".

== Background ==
On 24 May 1999, the album's lead single, "Saltwater", was released to commercial success. The song included a revision of the vocals from Clannad's "Theme from Harry's Game" provided by the original and featured singer, Máire Brennan. The single reached number six on the UK Singles Chart and number one on the UK Dance Singles Chart.

On 6 March 2000, the album's second single, "Don't Give Up", was released. It features Canadian singer Bryan Adams, and was a commercial success, reaching number one on the UK Singles Chart, number three in the United States Dance Club Songs chart, and certifying silver and gold in the United Kingdom and Australia respectively. It remains Chicane's most commercially successful single to date. The album's other singles include "No Ordinary Morning" / "Halcyon" on 10 July 2000, with the A-side featuring Tracy Ackerman. The album's final single, "Autumn Tactics", was released on 16 October 2000 and features Justine Suissa.

== Release ==
On 27 March 2000, the album was released through Xtravaganza Recordings in the United Kingdom. In the United States, it was distributed by C2 Records, as part of a then newly signed distribution deal between Xtravaganza and the now defunct imprint of Columbia Records. After its release, the album reached number 10 in the United Kingdom, 7 in New Zealand, 15 in Australia. The album also saw success throughout Continental Europe, charting in Germany, Finland, Belgium and the Netherlands. On 16 June 2000, the album was certified gold in the United Kingdom.

On 22 November 2013, a remastered deluxe edition of the album was released by Armada Music. Upon release, the album charted on the UK Dance Albums Chart, reaching number thirty three.

== Critical reception ==
Professional ratings
Review scores
| Source | Rating |
|---|---|
| AllMusic | 3/5 stars |
| ARTISTdirect | 3/5 stars |
| Billboard | favourable |
| Miami Herald | 3/5 stars |
| The Observer | favourable |
| TranceCritic.com | 4/5 stars |

Upon release, Behind the Sun received mostly positive reviews from critics. William Ruhlmann from AllMusic gave the album a positive review rating it three stars out of five. He claimed that "[Chicane has] a strong pop sense to go with his taste for ambient and trance dance tracks", and praised how "he cleverly hooks up with some established names looking to extend their appeal into the dance field". An issue of Billboard described the album as "a sublime musical journey". Trance Critic gave the album a mixed to positive review, claiming that the album largely veers away from traditional trance music. They stated that "[the album] seems to act in opposition to every convention of trance music [...] yet, in bizarre and spectacular style, Chicane has reversed the trend by actually being considerably better on the downtempo works". However, they also wrote that "[the] album is far from perfect", but rated it four stars out of five.

== Track listing ==
| No. | Title | Writer(s) | Length |
|---|---|---|---|
| 1. | "Overture" | Nick Bracegirdle | 3:46 |
| 2. | "Low Sun" | Bracegirdle | 6:56 |
| 3. | "No Ordinary Morning" (vocals by Tracy Ackerman) | Bracegirdle, Ray Hedges, Martin Brannigan | 5:08 |
| 4. | "Saltwater (Original Mix)" (vocals by Máire Brennan) | Bracegirdle, Hedges, Pól Brennan, Ciarán Brennan | 10:03 |
| 5. | "Halcyon" | Bracegirdle | 9:01 |
| 6. | "Autumn Tactics" (vocals by Justine Suissa) | Bracegirdle, Hedges | 4:53 |
| 7. | "Overlap" | Bracegirdle | 4:38 |
| 8. | "Don't Give Up (Original Mix)" (vocals by Bryan Adams) | Bracegirdle, Bryan Adams, Hedges | 8:22 |
| 9. | "Saltwater (The Thrillseekers Remix)" (vocals by Máire Brennan) | Bracegirdle, Hedges, Brennan, Brennan | 6:55 |
| 10. | "Andromeda" | Bracegirdle, Leo Elstob | 6:38 |
| 11. | "Don't Give Up (Original Radio Edit)" (vocals by Bryan Adams) (hidden track on US edition) | Bracegirdle, Adams, Hedges | 3:40 |
| Total length: | | | 71:01 |

Two-disc edition bonus DVD
| No. | Title | Length |
|---|---|---|
| 1. | "Saltwater" (music video) |
| 2. | "Don't Give Up" (music video) |
| 3. | "No Ordinary Morning" (music video) |
| 4. | "Autumn Tactics" (music video) |
| 5. | "Saltwater" (TV theme for Tourism Ireland) |

== Charts ==
2000 chart performance for Behind the Sun
| Chart (2000) | Peak position |
|---|---|
| Australian Albums (ARIA) | 15 |
| Belgian Albums (Ultratop Flanders) | 50 |
| Dutch Albums (Album Top 100) | 62 |
| Finnish Albums (Suomen virallinen lista) | 34 |
| French Albums (SNEP) | 29 |
| German Albums (Offizielle Top 100) | 33 |
| Irish Albums (IRMA) | 50 |
| New Zealand Albums (RMNZ) | 7 |
| Swiss Albums (Schweizer Hitparade) | 66 |
| UK Albums (Official Charts) | 10 |

2013 chart performance for Behind the Sun
| Chart (2013) | Peak position |
|---|---|
| UK Dance Albums (Official Charts) | 33 |

== Certifications ==
Certifications for Behind the Sun
| Region | Certification | Certified units/sales |
|---|---|---|
| United Kingdom (BPI) | Gold | 100,000^{^} |
^{^} Shipments figures based on certification alone.
