= Web Sheriff =

UK anti-piracy company

- Formation: 19 October 2000; 26 years ago
- Founder: John Giacobbi
- Registration no.: 04093131
- Purpose: Intellectual property rights
- Headquarters: Pewsey, Wiltshire, UK
- Location: London, United Kingdom
- Region served: International
- Services: Copyright enforcement, digital rights management, website building, hosting and management, video editing
- Owner: Web Sheriff Limited
- Director: John Edouard Giacobbi
- Secretary: Robert Arthur Davage
- Employees: 20
- Website: websheriff.com

Web Sheriff is an anti-piracy company based in the United Kingdom that provides intellectual property, copyright and privacy rights protection services. The company monitors various websites that host links to downloads of music and film. Web Sheriff has been in operation since 2000, with two offices in the UK.

The company was founded by intellectual property lawyer John Giacobbi, who acts as its managing director. Web Sheriff sends legal take-down notices to BitTorrent and other file sharing sites. According to the Los Angeles Times, Web Sheriff is a "leading advocate of the soft sell" in the anti-piracy industry.

== Description ==
Web Sheriff performs various copy protection services. These include protection from copyright infringement, libel, cyber-bullying, identity theft privacy issues of social media, policing of trading sites and recovery of fraudulently registered domain names. It also furnishes online security for concert tours.

== Operating methods ==
Web Sheriff uses proprietary software and web crawler programs to search the Internet, using human auditing to determine the type of site that is posting its clients' copyrighted material. It relies heavily on phone calls and relationship building and when locating unauthorized links it targets the persons running the sites. The supposed offending party is sent a take-down notice before further action is taken. Some Torrent sites and file-sharing sites such as MediaFire and RapidShare provide access to the company to remove infringing content itself.

The Los Angeles Times described the company's approach as representing "a sharp turn in the recording industry's life-and-death struggle with piracy, one driven largely by performers and their managers rather than the record companies." When it contracts to protect new music releases, the company encourages the artists it represents to give fans several tracks ahead of the release.

== History ==
Web Sheriff was founded in 2000 by former music attorney and industry consultant John Giacobbi.

Web Sheriff was hired by Prince in September 2007 to help him "disappear entirely from the internet." The star's spokesman related that "Prince believes strongly that as an artist the music rights must remain with the artist and thus copyrights should be protected across the board." "Very few artists have ever taken this kind of action over their rights." Web Sheriff announced it would launch lawsuits against YouTube, eBay, and The Pirate Bay on behalf of Prince if they refused compliance in removing links to his unauthorized photos, videos, and music. Peter Sunde, co-founder of The Pirate Bay, dismissed the threats, stating that American law was not applicable in Sweden. YouTube complied by removing over 2,000 videos from their site and eBay removed more than 300 auctions. In November 2007, three fan sites were given the notice to remove all images of the singer, his lyrics, and "anything linked to Prince's likeness". Some of the Prince fans fought back, formed their own organization called "Prince Fans United" and hired an attorney. Multiple unauthorized overseas online sites selling merchandise featuring Prince were shut down.

In 2008 the company was hired by Bryan Adams to take down fan sites and tribute bands as well as the owner of the domain name pointlookout.com that had nothing to do with the artist.

In 2016, the company was hired by Axl Rose to remove an unflattering picture by claiming the copyright belonged to Axl Rose and not the photographer.

== Reception ==
Music fans and bloggers often initially respond angrily when first approached by Web Sheriff on its clients' official and unofficial forums. According to the Evening Standard, "Music blogging sites are littered with comments with the Sheriff's contact details at the top, thanking bloggers for obeying the rules." Fans sometimes interpret this as Web Sheriff saying, "I've got my eye on you." The company reports that eventually most of the fans tend to respect the wishes of their favored artists by cooperating. As related by The Guardian, The Prodigy fans on the brainkiller forum engaged with Web Sheriff on a thread that lasted through 18 pages. Some of the fans who had been hostile at the beginning, then asked what they could do to help the band.

Web Sheriff's method of using a "velvet glove approach" to appeal to fans has been said by Randy Lewis with the Los Angeles Times to have notable successes, including Lady Gaga's Born This Way and Adele's 21. This journalist also notes that despite these examples of the success of the "diplomatic strategy", the company's gentle approach still has skeptics, with some critics calling it naïve: Brad Buckles, an executive in copyright enforcement with RIAA, was quoted as saying: "It's certainly well-intended and may work in some cases. The problem is in many, many cases, you're dealing with people who have no respect whatsoever for the intellectual property of record labels or the artists themselves." A Billboard journalist concludes that to appeal to sites that post links to unauthorized music and engaging with fans and redirecting them to authorized content by the artist is a "strategy with a future if implemented properly."

== See also ==
- Copyfraud
