= Sunstroke (song) =

Single by Chicane

from the album Far from the Maddening Crowds
- Released: 2 June 1997
- Genre: Electronic
- Length: 6:21
- Label: Edel; Modena; Xtravaganza
- Songwriter: Nick Bracegirdle

Chicane singles chronology
"Offshore" (1996)	"Sunstroke" (1997)	"Offshore '97" (1997)

Music video
- "Sunstroke" on YouTube

Alternative cover
- 2012 re-release cover

"Sunstroke" is a song by British electronic music artist Chicane. The song was released on 2 June 1997 as the second single from his debut studio album, Far from the Maddening Crowds (1997). Upon release, the song entered the UK Singles Chart on 14 June 1997 at number 21, the next week it dropped 24 places to number 45, by week 3 the song dropped to number 71. Like "Offshore", "Sunstroke" is heavily based on the track, "Love on a Real Train" by Tangerine Dream. The Disco Citizens "On the Train" mix is a reference to this.

== Critical reception ==
British magazine Music Week rated the song five out of five, writing, "The much anticipated follow-up to 1996's Offshore has all the quality hallmarks of Chicane's minimal yet ethereal house sound with angelic vocals and effectively spacious beats." Tim Jeffery from RM gave it four out of five, adding, "On first listen this doesn't appear to match 'Offshore' and 'Footprint' for quality or anthem status, but the simple synth chord sequence is actually very infectious. It may not be as original or as intricate as its predecessors but it's beautifully produced, crisp and has all the builds and breakdowns you'd expect, making it easy to program and a reliable floorfiller."

== Track list ==
- Single (Xtravaganza Recordings, 0091125 EXT)
1. "Sunstroke" (Disco Citizens Radio Edit) - 4:03
2. "Sunstroke" (Original Radio Edit) - 3:51
3. "Sunstroke" (Disco Citizens on the Train Remix) - 8:05
4. "Sunstroke" (Original Mix) - 6:21
5. "Sunstroke" (White Mix) - 6:41

== Charts ==
Chart (1997)	Peak position
Germany (GfK)	63
Ireland (IRMA)	20
UK Singles (OCC)	21
UK Dance (OCC)	3
US Dance Club Songs (Billboard)	19

== Release history ==
Region	Date	Format	Label	Ref
United Kingdom	2 June 1997	CD single	Xtravaganza	
