= Chicane (musician) =

English musician, DJ, composer, songwriter and record producer

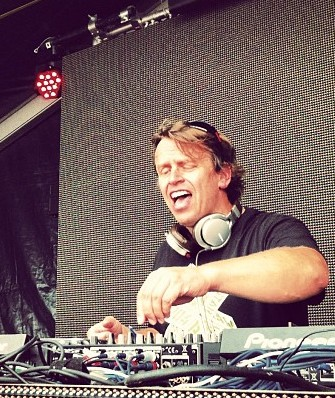
- Chicane in 2013

Background information
- Also known as: Disco Citizens; Sitvac
- Born: Nicholas Bracegirdle; 28 February 1971 (age 55)
- Origin: Chalfont St Giles, England
- Genres: Electronic; trance; house; balearic; ambient; chill-out
- Occupations: Electronic musician; record producer; songwriter; remixer; record label owner; DJ
- Instruments: Synthesizer; piano; classical guitar
- Years active: 1994–present
- Labels: Modena; Enzo; Armada; Ultra; Central Station; Xtravaganza
- Past members: Leo Elstob
- Website: chicanemusic.com

Nicholas Bracegirdle (born 28 February 1971), known professionally as Chicane, is an English musician, DJ, composer, songwriter, and record producer. Among his works are singles "Offshore", an Ibiza trance anthem included in many compilations in both chill-out and dance versions; "Saltwater", which featured vocals by Clannad member Máire Brennan; and the UK number-one hit "Don't Give Up", featuring vocals by Bryan Adams, which also became a top-ten hit on singles charts across Europe and Australia.

Far from the Maddening Crowds, Chicane's debut studio album from 1997, is still considered a seminal release among the trance music community, and his second studio album, 2000's Behind the Sun, was certified gold in the UK. In 2007, after the hindrance of an ultimately unreleased album (Easy to Assemble) in the intervening time, the third artist album Somersault was released on Bracegirdle's independent record label, followed shortly after by a tenth anniversary re-release of Far from the Maddening Crowds which included a new mix of "Offshore" ("Offshore 2007"). He released his fourth studio album Giants in 2010, with the fifth studio album Thousand Mile Stare following less than two years later, in spring 2012. The sixth studio album, The Sum of Its Parts, appeared in early 2015, and his seventh studio album, The Place You Can't Remember, the Place You Can't Forget, was released in 2018. His eighth studio album, Everything We Had to Leave Behind, was released in 2021, and his ninth studio album Nevertheless, was released two years later in 2023. His latest album, Trampolines, was released in 2024.

In addition, Bracegirdle also worked with Leo Elstob under the alias Disco Citizens, producing a handful of less radio-friendly, vocal-less tracks with a stronger progressive house sound. Working with singer Vanessa St. James and producer Mr. Joshua, Bracegirdle was part of the Mr. Joshua Presents Espiritu project, known for the song "In Praise of the Sun", released with both English and French vocals. Bracegirdle contributed with executive production on Tomski's "14 Hours to Save the Earth". Nick Bracegirdle has also used the alias Sitvac to produce a one-off single, "Wishful Thinking".

== Early life ==
While having trained in classical guitar and piano at an early age, Bracegirdle's earliest influences in electronic music came from melodic composers such as Jean Michel Jarre and Vangelis, and synthpop pioneer Vince Clarke; a further influence was the dance hit "Anthem" by the house music group N-Joi. All of this convinced him to pursue the creation of melodic electronic dance music. By the age of 12, he was making music in recording studios and sending demos to record labels.

== Career ==
=== 1996–1998: Initial success and Far from the Maddening Crowds ===
Bracegirdle's first release was the four track EP Cyanide Music Volume One in 1996. This contained music styles varying from deep house to trip hop and nu-disco. This was released the Cyanide record label and was a little known precursor to "Offshore". The Cyanide label then released Offshore EP #1, which contained the original version of "Offshore" as well three other tracks, again of varying styles. Eventually Bracegirdle founded his own record label Modena Records, which holds the rights to all his songs and licenses them to other labels for release and distribution. A partnership with Leo Elstob produced the first Disco Citizens single, "Right Here Right Now", in 1995, as well as the first Chicane single, "Offshore", in 1996. "Offshore" would be the first of Chicane's many releases on Edel UK Records and independent UK dance music record label Xtravaganza Recordings, then-newly founded by DJ and Bracegirdle's college friend Alex Gold. It reached No. 12 on the UK Singles Chart (and No. 1 on other UK-based charts compiled by Mixmag, Record Mirror, and others), the top 40 in multiple European countries, and No. 5 on the US Billboard Hot Dance Music/Club Play charts in 1997 upon re-release. Its inclusion on numerous Ibiza-themed trance music compilation albums (such as Café del Mar) attest to its popularity in the nightclubs on the island, one of the worldwide epicentres of dance music.

"Sunstroke", the follow-up single, attained similar popularity and chart numbers. A third single, "Offshore '97" (a separate item from the re-release of "Offshore") is a mashup of "Offshore" with the a capella from the Power Circle song "A Little Love, a Little Life", mixed by producer and DJ Anthony Pappa. Originally a bootleg, it was turned into an official release, credited to "Chicane with Power Circle".

Following these releases, Bracegirdle's debut studio album Far from the Maddening Crowds was released in September 1997. Additional singles that followed were "Lost You Somewhere", the Benelux release "Red Skies", and the non-album single "Strong in Love", for which Bracegirdle used vocals by British singer Sylvia Mason-James (after discovering that she was the vocalist on the Paul Oakenfold and Steve Osborne remix of "Lemon" by U2) and first collaborated on production with Ray "Madman" Hedges (producer for B*Witched and Boyzone).

=== 1999–2003: Collaborations and Behind the Sun ===
1999 saw the release of "Saltwater", a song based on Máire Brennan's vocals from "Theme from Harry's Game" by the Celtic band Clannad. It surpassed all previous Chicane singles, reaching No. 6 on the UK charts and No. 1 on all five major UK dance charts. The song was used in a Belfast City advertisement broadcast in 2005–2006 across regional channels. The version of the vocals used in "Saltwater", however, was a new recording by Brennan herself.

After producing a radio remix of Bryan Adams's "Cloud Number Nine", Bracegirdle offered Adams the vocal position on the song "Don't Give Up". The vocals Adams recorded were subsequently heavily processed through a vocoder so as to play down his rock music vocal style. The vocal credit was initially not publicised when the single was sent to Pete Tong's BBC Radio 1 program Essential Selection. On the show, Tong made the song his first "Essential New Tune" selection of the new millennium. It was also Chicane's biggest hit, debuting at No. 1 on the UK charts (and notably replacing "American Pie", Madonna's No. 1 single of the previous week), reached No. 3 on the US dance chart and No. 1 on Australian and Russian charts, and made other charts across Europe as well.

On 27 March 2000, Bracegirdle released his second studio album Behind the Sun. It was certified gold by the BPI, while "Don't Give Up" was certified silver. Two other singles were released from the album—the double A-side "No Ordinary Morning / Halcyon", and "Autumn Tactics"—but neither were as successful as the preceding releases.

In 2002, Bracegirdle co-wrote two songs on Cher's album Living Proof, "You Take It All" and "Alive Again", the latter which was released as a single in Europe only. The 2001 Edition of the EA Sports Formula One Video Game Series included the songs "Sunstroke", "The Drive Home", and a remix of "Nagasaki Badger".

=== 2006–2008: New management and Somersault ===
"Chicane feat. Tom Jones – Stoned in Love (12" mix)" (2006)
Sample of "Stoned in Love".

Eventually, under the new management of John Cavanagh, April 2006 saw the release of a new single, "Stoned in Love", on Globe Records through Universal Music Group, featuring singer Tom Jones on vocals. (Press Release). At the time of the announcement the song was also played twice by Pete Tong.

The track received substantial UK TV promotion in the run up to the week of release, featuring utterly live performances on Friday Night with Jonathan Ross, The New Paul O'Grady Show and a semi-live performance on BBC's now defunct Top of the Pops. Jones and Bracegirdle were also interviewed on Channel 5 News; When asked in the 5 News interview where he had been since "Don't Give Up", Bracegirdle replied that he had been "basically stuffed" by the internet bootlegging of the album Easy to Assemble.

In February 2007, Chicane departed from Universal as well; according to the official website, all new material would be released through Modena itself. The follow-up single "Come Tomorrow" was released on 16 July 2007, followed by the third official studio album, Somersault, a week later on 23 July 2007. Bracegirdle has entirely self-financed these initial independent releases, as well as subsequent live performances. On 4 May 2007, the Cicada remix of "Come Tomorrow" was played on Radio 1 by Pete Tong.

On 25 August 2008, Chicane released "Bruised Water" with Natasha Bedingfield. Promotional copies of the track were made available, with remixes from Mischa Daniels and Adam K. Following the leak of his 2003 album, Chicane now employs the international internet policing company, Web Sheriff to prevent links to unlicensed material, such as this single and other tracks from his upcoming album, from being posted on various blogs and websites.

In October 2008, Chicane released a greatest hits compilation, The Best of Chicane - 1996-2008 which features his previous singles, along with a new track called "Wake Up", a collaboration with Keane. "No Ordinary Morning", "Don't Give Up" and "Saltwater" were re-recorded for the album as the original sound recordings were still owned by Xtravaganza and were unable to be licensed due to the dispute between Chicane and Alex Gold in 2002. Chicane's Xtravaganza recordings from Far From The Maddening Crowds were no longer owned by Xtravaganza and thus were included in their original form.

=== 2009–2010: Giants ===
Bracegirdle worked with producers James Hockley and Richard Searle on the Re-Work EP for a targeted summer 2009 release, along with a new and fourth Chicane album and mixes of forthcoming productions by BT and William Orbit. The lead track from the Re-work EP, "Poppiholla" based on the track "Hoppípolla" by Sigur Rós, was A-listed on Radio 1. It charted at No. 7 in the top 10 on 19 July 2009, and was added to a reissued version of the Best of album. The download single contained a remix by the Thrillseekers, along with a mix by Bracegirdle's moniker Disco Citizens. The follow-up to this single was revealed as "Hiding All the Stars", which contains a sample of Gary Numan's "Cars", which had its first full play on Radio 1's Floorfillers on 21 August 2009.

In September, Chicane produced a remix of the classic track "Relax (Don't Do It)" by Frankie Goes to Hollywood, which is part of the 25-year anniversary of the seminal track. It was learned that the Re-Work EP was cancelled although no official announcement was ever made in regards to this. Other 'reworked' tracks that were due to appear on the EP were never mentioned from the initial announcement. Recently stated from Chicane Management; there were actually quite a few that people never got to hear. In a June 2010 interview with Impact Magazine, Bracegirdle commented on the 'Re-work EP' issue. "We covered House Arrest and there's a massive bag of legal problems with that record. God knows why. Poppiholla became this complete and utter monster... The best laid plans of mice and men can go completely astray once you have a big record. Things change all the time... the plan was to (release Re-worked) and then the whole thing went completely mental... in a good way."

The first official word on Chicane's fourth studio album, Giants, came in January through his Facebook artist profile. "Come Back", the first single in connection with the new album, is a rework of the Paul Young 1980s hit "Come Back and Stay" and came with a remix by Riley & Durrant. The single was released on 25 April. The same month a new track, "Barefoot", was added to Chicane's website. A laidback, Baleric-style tune, it proved popular with listeners awaiting the new album. This was followed by the track "Titles".

In May, Bracegirdle officially announced the new album through Facebook. He also revealed a new single "Middledistancerunner", featuring Owl City's Adam Young on vocals. "The Nothing Song" is a remake of another Sigur Ros song: "Untitled 4". The album also features the singles "Hiding All the Stars", "Come Back" and "Poppiholla".

The album and "Middledistancerunner" were released on 2 August 2010. During the first week of release, a new track, called Velo, was given away as a free download via Chicane's website. In November the track "Where Do I Start" was released as a single. Among others it was remixed by Armin van Buuren.

=== 2011–2015: Thousand Mile Stare and The Sum of Its Parts ===
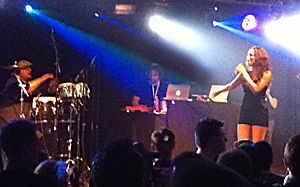
Chicane performing in Stockholm, Sweden, May 2011

An upcoming Chicane single was announced in April through Twitter. "Going Deep", featuring British producer and rapper Aggi Dukes, had its first airplay on Steve Smart's radio show Friday Night Kiss on 8 April. The video was released at the start of July and tells the story of Aggi Dukes—represented by a comical puppet, starting off in a cafe in the UK, before he undertakes on an epic party holiday to Magaluf, Mallorca. The single was released on 14 August, and remixes were made by Steve Smart & WestFunk, and VillaNaranjos. On 18 June, Chicane released the 'Wawa Remix' of his production "Spirit" as a free download from the official homepage.

On 29 July 2011, Chicane revealed a preview of the title track for the then forthcoming artist album Thousand Mile Stare on YouTube. Unfortunately, by November it was clear that the album had been leaked onto the internet, the second time such an occasion had occurred in Chicane's career. For a time it seemed doubtful whether the album would ever get released, but an exclusive box set version of Thousand Mile Stare was released on 12 December 2011. It included a cassette-shaped USB flash drive of rare material and an album of remixes. Each early order contained the buyer's name on the album sleeve. The regular version of the album, which contained three previously unreleased tracks, was released on 16 April 2012, with an album launch live show following in London at Koko on 27 April with guest performances from Kate Walsh, Vigri, Aggi Dukes and support from VillaNaranjos.

On 13 April 2012, the Dutch label Armada Music announced that they had joined with Chicane's UK record label Modena Records. After having worked together extensively throughout the past four years, with Armada Music releasing Chicane's singles and albums for the Benelux, Germany, Switzerland, Austria and Poland, Armada will be representing Chicane worldwide in the future.

In July 2012, Chicane collaborated with Ferry Corsten to write and produce a track called "One Thousand Suns", featuring singer Christian Burns, and loosely based on Chicane's "Thousand Mile Stare".

In a 9 December 2012 interview with Eightoctaves.com, Chicane announced that he was working on a new album. He also said in the interview that "There are going to be some pretty stunning collaborations and guest appearances, I hope. I've just been recording in Mumbai with Anushka and that track is going to be stunning."

In 2013, Chicane released "One More Time" which featured the vocals of Duane Harden.

In April 2014, Chicane had a dispute with DJ Mark Knight about his unauthorized sampling of "Saltwater" in Knight's track "The Return of Wolfy".

On 25 May 2014, Chicane released the single "No More I Sleep", featuring the vocals of Senadee.

In the July 2014 issue of the Sun:Sets radio show, Chicane named the title of the upcoming album The Sum of Its Parts. It was released on 25 January 2015. An unconfirmed pre-order listing on iTunes UK showed an early release date (16 November 2014) and a different track list running order. The fourth single from the album is called "Still With Me" and is sung by British artist Bo Bruce. A remix by Andreas Van Hoog was premiered on Forth One Radio. The single was officially released on 26 October 2014.

Chicane released "Oxygen" as a remix EP on 5 July 2015, the fifth single from The Sum of Its Parts. On 2 October 2015, he released two new tracks "Ibiza Strings" and "Ibiza Bleeps" as part his second extended play Ibiza. He released the sixth and final single "Fibreglasses" on 30 October 2015.

=== 2016–2019: Twenty and The Place You Can't Remember, the Place You Can't Forget ===
On 29 July 2016, Chicane released a compilation album titled Twenty as a celebration of his twentieth anniversary in the music industry. The album was preceded by the lead single "Carry Me Home" (a rework of the song of the same name by Gloworm) featuring the vocals of Steve Edwards; released on 3 June 2016.

Twenty features Chicane's greatest hits, plus brand new remixes by Philip George, Kryder, Grum, Jody Wisternoff, Thomas Datt, and himself. As with the 2008 best of album, "No Ordinary Morning", "Don't Give Up" and "Saltwater" are re-recordings as the original sound recordings were still owned by Xtravaganza and were unable to be licensed for this compilation due to a dispute between Chicane and Xtravaganza boss Alex Gold, dated back to 2002. Chicane's previous Xtravaganza recordings which had been distributed by Edel Records in 1996/1997 are featured in their original form as Xtravaganza lost the rights to those sound recordings, with "Strong in Love" being released for the first time since its original release in 1998.

On 16 February 2018, Chicane released a mix compilation album titled Sun:Sets 2018 (Selected by Chicane).

In 2018, Chicane announced his seventh studio album on his weekly Sun:Sets podcast. The album The Place You Can't Remember, the Place You Can't Forget was released on 8 June 2018. It includes the singles "Gorecki" (originally written & performed by Lou Rhodes and the band Lamb) and "Serendipity" featuring Tracy Ackerman.

In 2019, Chicane released the follow-up to the original Sun:Sets compilation with the album titled Sun:Sets 2019 (Selected by Chicane).

=== 2020–present: Everything We Had to Leave Behind ===
In May 2020, Chicane released Behind The Sun (2020 Anniversary Mixes), featuring new mixes and remixes from other artists of the original tracks from the 2000 album.

On 23 April 2021, Chicane released his eighth studio album, titled Everything We Had to Leave Behind.

On 9 June 2023, Chicane released his ninth studio album, titled Nevertheless.

Also in 2023, on 1 December, Chicane released The Greatest Misses, a sixteen-track compilation featuring songs created by Chicane that, despite earning critical acclaim and fan approval, failed to achieve chart-topping success.

On 15 November 2024, Chicane released Trampolines, a thirteen-track collection.

== Musical style ==
=== Style ===
Bracegirdle describes his music as being strongly influenced by the relaxed, summer atmosphere of Ibiza, where he was taken on holidays as a child. In an interview in 2012, Bracegirdle stated that he does not draw inspiration from dance music; but from film soundtracks and musicians like Brian Eno and Trevor Horn. He wrote "I have a lot of time for producers like myself, BT, Eric Prydz, but as I said, they are not really an influence upon me. It's artists such as Vangelis that inspired me many years back".

His first two studio albums, along with Giants – the fourth studio album – are known for atmospheric, ambient melodies and shifting moods and tempos, particularly Far from the Maddening Crowds, which has been called "a soundtrack for an average day".

Bracegirdle's career took a turn following the release of Behind the Sun, at which point he stated desires to focus on being a recording artist and producer, starting with planned work on Bryan Adams' then-upcoming studio album. (However, Adams would not release another studio album until 2004.) Bracegirdle also put remix work on hold at this point, reportedly turning down Jean Michel Jarre, Moby, and both Kylie and Dannii Minogue. The music that followed also changed; in more recent interviews, Bracegirdle has noted that he is consciously moving away from the influences of Ibiza in his songwriting—calling it a return to his "song writing background" as opposed to dance music.

Bracegirdle's dance music productions have caused him to be incorrectly identified as a DJ throughout his career. As early as 1997, The Mirror called him a "top DJ" in an article, while the Portland Press Herald published a 2000 review in which both Chicane and BT were referred to as DJs. Most recently, in 2007, Bracegirdle remarked in an interview that many people still hold this belief.

Far from the Maddening Crowds and Behind the Sun were both primarily recorded at Chicane's personal recording studio, Modena One (sharing the name of his own record label), located at his parents' house. Co-producers who worked on these albums are Leo Elstob, Salt Tank, Ray "Madman" Hedges, and Martin Brannigan. Tomski was commissioned to program the opening tracks ("Early" and "Overture") on both albums and contributed snippets and sounds to other tracks. However, Bracegirdle has stated that he works alone when in his own studio. Recently, references to a studio called "Modena 2" have appeared in liner notes since the April 2006 release of the "Stoned in Love" single.

With the April 2011 premiere of the Chicane single "Going Deep" Bracegirdle stressed his own statement, that 'Chicane music is not bound by a certain genre'. 'Going Deep' is certainly a new turn in the sound as it is a blend of 90s retro disco, rap in a modern house, trance package.

=== Live ===
Chicane also performs live shows as a full-fledged band, which has included a rotating line-up of singers, guitarists, drummers, and flautists, as well as Bracegirdle himself on keyboards. Justine Suissa, who provided vocals on "Autumn Tactics" from Behind the Sun, toured with the band in 2000. English electronic producer Tom Jankiewicz (Tomski) was a frequent musical collaborator with Chicane from 1995 to 2006, and he also played keyboards and engineered in the band during that period. Session drummers in the band, notably, have included Mark Pusey (Eminem, Natasha Bedingfield, Sway), Shovell from M People, Simon Merry (Natalie Imbruglia) and David Barbarossa from Bow Wow Wow.

The band's current line-up since 2006 consists of the following musicians:

- Nick Bracegirdle (Chicane) – keyboards, programming
- Natasha Andrews, Kristin Hosein or Jaki Graham – vocals
- Simon Small – guitars
- Carl Holt – bass
- Mark Pusey (2005–present) – drums
- Simon Merry – drums (2009–present)

Though the band's singers usually substitute for the original vocalists from the song due to the latter's other recording commitments, there have been exceptions; for example, both Maire Brennan and Bryan Adams performed live with the band in Ibiza in 2000. The former took place at one of the annual Ibiza festivals held by MTV at the turn of the 2000s, while the latter took place at a heavily promoted concert hosted by Xtravaganza on 4 August at Privilege Ibiza, which was attended by over 7000, including Bono and Noel Gallagher.

Chicane has also played at major European music festivals, such as the Glastonbury Festival and Creamfields in England and the Roskilde Festival in Denmark; as well as Red Square in Moscow.

Chicane has performed remixes (specifically, the "Tomski vs. Disco Citizens" remixes) live, as shown by a track listing from Chicane's 22 January 2000 performance at the Palladium in Cologne, Germany. This is unusual in that remixes, as products of audio editing, are not generally considered instrumental performances in their own right. At least some aspects of this are credited to Tomski himself, on stage.

Bracegirdle also made a guest appearance live with Bryan Adams at the 2000 Slane Concert, as seen on Adams' Live at Slane Castle DVD.

Most recently on 29 March 2025, Chicane performed a Symphonic rendition of his first album Far from the Maddening Crowds with a live Orchestra, to a sell out audience at the Royal Festival Hall in London. Bracegirdle later remarked on his Sunset's podcast, that this was probably the most memorable gig of his career.

== Discography ==
Studio albums

- Far from the Maddening Crowds (1997)
- Behind the Sun (2000)
- Somersault (2007)
- Giants (2010)
- Thousand Mile Stare (2012)
- The Sum of Its Parts (2015)
- The Place You Can't Remember, the Place You Can't Forget (2018)
- Everything We Had to Leave Behind (2021)
- Nevertheless (2023)
- Trampolines (2024)
