= Don't Give Up (Chicane song) =

2000 single by Chicane

Single by Chicane featuring Bryan Adams

from the album Behind the Sun
- B-side: "Low Sun"
- Released: 6 March 2000
- Studio: Modena One, Mothership (UK)
- Genre: Trance; chill-out
- Length: 8:38 (album version); 3:42 (2000 radio edit); 3:58 (2004 radio edit)
- Label: Xtravaganza
- Songwriters: Nick Bracegirdle; Bryan Adams; Ray "Madman" Hedges
- Producers: Chicane; Ray "Madman" Hedges

Chicane singles chronology
"Saltwater" (1999)	"Don't Give Up" (2000)	"No Ordinary Morning" / "Halcyon" (2000)
"Love on the Run" (2003)	"Don't Give Up 2004" (2004)	"Stoned in Love" (2006)

Bryan Adams singles chronology
"The Best of Me" (1999)	"Don't Give Up" (2000)	"Inside Out" (2000)

Alternative cover
- 2012 re-release cover

Music video
- "Don't Give Up" on YouTube

"Don't Give Up" is a song by British electronic music artist Chicane featuring vocals from Canadian singer Bryan Adams. The track was released on 6 March 2000 as the second single from Chicane's second studio album, Behind the Sun (2000). "Don't Give Up" peaked at number one on the UK Singles Chart and became a popular dance track in clubs across Europe and North America.

== Background ==
The collaboration between the two musicians began in 1999, when Adams contacted Chicane at his studio to arrange for a remix of Adams's forthcoming single "Cloud Number 9" from his 1998 album On a Day Like Today. The resulting remix was selected by Adams as the radio edit of the single, which went on to reach number six on the UK chart.

Later, having written the music for a track that needed to be turned into a song, Chicane played the idea to Adams during his search for a voice. Adams agreed to the role, and also wrote the melody and lyrics to the song "Don't Give Up".

Adams's rock-styled vocals were buried in audio processing. This was done through Prosoniq's OrangeVocoder plugin on Steinberg's Cubase VST digital audio workstation. Even though his voice was altered electronically, it is still recognisable. One critic felt the processed vocals were unsuccessful: "Adams digitally treated his vocal on this track to an extreme degree to make it sound less rock. I don't think he quite manages it – his singing is husky anyhow."

== Release ==
"Don't Give Up"
A 14 second sample of "Don't Give Up" demonstrating Bryan Adams' processed vocals.

Adams's vocal credit was initially not publicised, particularly when the single, in a white label release, was first played by noted BBC Radio 1 DJ Pete Tong on his 31 December 1999 Essential Selection show. It was chosen as Tong's "Essential New Tune" selection, which, on this episode, was specially designated "Essential New Tune for the millennium". On a later January show, Judge Jules, standing in for Tong, played it as the Essential New Tune again. It was also included on Tong's Essential Selection Spring 2000 compilation album.

On the week of 12 March 2000, "Don't Give Up" overtook "American Pie", Madonna's number one single of the previous week, on the UK Singles Chart, outselling it by 1224 copies and becoming Bryan Adams' second number one in the UK after "(Everything I Do) I Do It for You" in 1991 and Chicane's first. The song featured on the acclaimed 2000 mix album CreamLive. The song sold 270,000 copies in the UK as stated by the Official UK Charts Company.

In 2004, following Chicane's departure from Xtravaganza, the label issued "Don't Give Up 2004", a single including only new remixes by label founder Alex Gold and Xtravaganza artists Agnelli & Nelson.

== Critical reception ==
Dom Passantino of Stylus Magazine was mixed, saying "this is our Bryan's only entry to number one [in the UK Singles Chart in the 2000s], a far too obvious attempt at appealing to both Dave Pearce and Ken Bruce at the same time. Bizarrely enough, time has revealed it to actually be the colour negative of 'Emerge' by Fischerspooner. Except this actually sold some copies." Tom Ewing of Freaky Trigger, although saying the song predicted the EDM boom of the 2010s, was also mixed, saying: "Inadvertently, the track hits on an idea – throaty, effortful bloke singing over formula builds and drops – that we will see an awful lot of in the early 2010s. But this inadvertent futurism isn't the result of any particular vision, just an offspring of the listless humping of two clichés."

== Music video ==
A music video was released for the song, featuring a young girl working in a dystopian scenario, who occasionally snatches views of herself (using a Nokia Communicator) living in a more pleasant existence, interspersed with scenes of Adams singing the song.

== Track listings ==
- UK and Australian CD single
1. "Don't Give Up" (original radio edit) – 3:41
2. "Don't Give Up" (original mix) – 8:36
3. "Don't Give Up" (Disco Citizens vs. Tomski remix) – 7:30
- UK and US 12-inch single

A. "Don't Give Up" (original mix) – 9:49 (8:36 in US)
B. "Don't Give Up" (Disco Citizens vs. Tomski remix) – 8:45 (7:30 in US)

- UK cassette single, European and US CD single
1. "Don't Give Up" (original radio edit) – 3:41
2. "Don't Give Up" (Disco Citizens vs. Tomski remix) – 7:30
- US maxi-CD single
1. "Don't Give Up" (original radio edit) – 3:41
2. "Don't Give Up" (original mix) – 8:36
3. "Don't Give Up" (Disco Citizens vs. Tomski remix) – 7:30
4. "Low Sun" – 6:56
- UK CD single: "Don't Give Up 2004"
1. "Don't Give Up" (Alex Gold & The Sound Xpress radio edit)
2. "Don't Give Up" (Alex Gold & The Sound Xpress mix)
3. "Don't Give Up" (Agnelli & Nelson mix)
- UK 12-inch single: "Don't Give Up 2004"

A. "Don't Give Up" (Alex Gold & The Sound Xpress mix)
AA. "Don't Give Up" (Agnelli & Nelson mix)

== Charts ==
=== Weekly charts ===
Weekly chart performance for "Don't Give Up"
Chart (2000)	Peak position
Australia (ARIA)	6
Belgium (Ultratop 50 Flanders)	17
Belgium (Ultratop 50 Wallonia)	18
Canada Dance/Urban (RPM)	9
Denmark (IFPI)	12
Estonia (Eesti Top 20)	1
Europe (Eurochart Hot 100)	9
Finland (Suomen virallinen lista)	8
France (SNEP)	43
Germany (GfK)	24
Greece (IFPI)	9
Hungary (Mahasz)	9
Iceland (Íslenski Listinn Topp 40)	33
Ireland (IRMA)	11
Ireland Dance (IRMA)	2
Italy (FIMI)	20
Netherlands (Dutch Top 40)	14
Netherlands (Single Top 100)	21
New Zealand (Recorded Music NZ)	14
Norway (VG-lista)	6
Romania (Romanian Top 100)	8
Scottish Singles Sales (Official Charts)	2
Spain (Promusicae)	7
Sweden (Sverigetopplistan)	51
Switzerland (Schweizer Hitparade)	42
UK Singles (Official Charts)	1
UK Dance (Official Charts)	2
US Dance Club Songs (Billboard)	3
US Dance Singles Sales (Billboard)	17

=== Year-end charts ===
Year-end chart performance for "Don't Give Up"
Chart (2000)	Position
Australia (ARIA)	75
Europe (Eurochart Hot 100)	98
Romania (Romanian Top 100)	63
UK Singles (OCC)	41
US Dance Club Play (Billboard)	33

== Certifications ==
Certifications and sales for "Don't Give Up"
Region	Certification	Certified units/sales
Australia (ARIA)	Gold	35,000^{^}
United Kingdom (BPI)	Gold	400,000^{‡}
^{^} Shipments figures based on certification alone.^{‡} Sales+streaming figures based on certification alone.

== Release history ==
Release history and formats for "Don't Give Up"
Region	Version	Date	Format(s)	Label(s)	Ref(s).
United Kingdom	Original	6 March 2000	CD	Xtravaganza	
United States	Original	5 June 2000	Hot adult contemporary; modern adult contemporary radio	Xtravaganza; C2	
United States	Original	6 June 2000	Contemporary hit; rhythmic contemporary radio	Xtravaganza; C2	
United Kingdom	2004	2 February 2004	12-inch vinyl; CD	Xtravaganza	
