= Stoned in Love =

2006 single by Chicane

Single by Chicane featuring Tom Jones

from the album Somersault
- B-side: "Music for Elevators"
- Released: 24 April 2006
- Recorded: Shangri-La (Malibu) (vocals)
- Genre: EDM
- Length: 3:41 (radio edit)
- Label: Manifesto, Globe
- Songwriters: Nick Bracegirdle, Ray Hedges, Tom Jones, John Pickering, Nigel Butler
- Producers: Bracegirdle, Steve Osborne, Hedges

Chicane singles chronology
"Don't Give Up 2004" (2004)	"Stoned in Love" (2006)	"Come Tomorrow" (2007)

Tom Jones singles chronology
"Hold On I'm Coming" (2005)	"Stoned in Love" (2006)	"(Barry) Islands in the Stream" (2009)

Audio sample
- Sample of "Stoned in Love": file; help

"Stoned in Love" is a dance track by Chicane (Nick Bracegirdle), with vocals performed by famed pop singer Tom Jones. It was released as a physical single on 24 April 2006. The song was later included on Chicane's third studio album, Somersault (2007), as well as Tom Jones' 2006 compilation Greatest Hits: The Platinum Edition.

The song followed a number of genre crossover recordings for both musicians, Bracegirdle having recorded previous hits with Celtic folk singer Máire Brennan and rock singer Bryan Adams, and Jones having recorded the house music hit "Sex Bomb" with producer Mousse T.

== History ==
Having written the song, Bracegirdle was looking for a singer able to reach a high pitch in vocal range, without having to resort to falsetto. According to Bracegirdle, his initial candidates were Jones, James Dean Bradfield and Kelly Jones — all Welshmen. Jones has stated that he had never heard of Chicane before being approached with the song, but soon took a liking to the material: "It's a very well written song with good lyrics. It's a proper song structurally and not just a moody record."

The single was first announced in March 2006 in a press release on the official Chicane website, following three years of minimal recording activity and little publicity from Bracegirdle. Soon after, audio and video samples were hosted on the official Chicane and Tom Jones websites.

The single received play from various DJs on BBC Radio 1, including noted DJ Pete Tong on 24 February and 10 March, and Dave Pearce on 2 April.

Jones' knighthood by Queen Elizabeth II took place during this period of time, on 29 March 2006.

Two concerts were announced with the release of the single: the Manchester Academy on 22 April, and the Islington academy on 24 April. At the 22 April concert, a number of new songs from the upcoming album were played to the public for the first time, including the next single, "Come Tomorrow".

Jones has performed the song live with Chicane on Friday Night with Jonathan Ross on 21 April, on 24 April at the Islington Academy and The Paul O'Grady Show, and on 30 April on Top of the Pops.

== Vocal performance ==
Jones's singing in the song is noted for being "lighter" and quieter than usual during the verses, to the extent that listeners don't always recognize his voice at first listen. During the choruses, however, he switches to his traditional, high-register vocal style.

While on Top of the Pops, Jones's performance of the song was mandated by his record label, requiring a second performance to be recorded in order to get the song "right".

== Single release ==
"Stoned in Love" entered the UK Singles Chart at No. 42 on the week starting 23 April 2006, simultaneous to its release date (prior to this, only digital downloads were available). The next week, the song rose to No. 8, and on its third week, it climbed to its peak of No. 7. The single received remixes by Vertigo and The Young Punx.

On 11 July 2006, "Stoned in Love" was released in Canada as a digital download single on the Universal Music Canada imprint label GLOW Digital. Billed as "Canada's first digital dance/pop label", GLOW was launched with "Stoned in Love" as its first release.

== Music video ==
The music video, directed by Phil Griffin, was made available on the Top of the Pops website as of the 16 April 2006 show.

The video tells a caper story, showing a woman (played by Jane Le) and a man driving through a desert and robbing gas stations, and two police officers in pursuit of them. The man is dubbed the "Tom Jones Bandit" on a wanted poster because he is always seen wearing a rubber Tom Jones mask. Filming took place in the United States.

The video ends with the man being arrested and unmasked, revealing the real Tom Jones underneath.

== Track listing ==
UK CD single

1. "Stoned in Love" (radio edit) – 3:41
2. "Stoned in Love" (commercial 12-inch mix) – 5:01
3. "Stoned in Love" (Vertigo vocal mix) – 9:04
4. "Stoned in Love" (The Young Punx Vocal remix) – 7:51
5. "Stoned in Love" (video)

== Charts ==
=== Weekly charts ===
Chart (2006)	Peak position
Australia (ARIA)	43
Finland (Suomen virallinen lista)	6
Hungary (Dance Top 40)	12
Hungary (Editors' Choice Top 40)	23
Ireland (IRMA)	23
Italy (FIMI)	26
Netherlands (Single Top 100)	66
Scottish Singles Sales (Official Charts)	6
UK Singles (Official Charts)	7
UK Dance (Official Charts)	9

=== Year-end charts ===
Chart (2006)	Position
UK Singles (OCC)	77

== Certifications ==
Region	Certification	Certified units/sales
United Kingdom (BPI)	Silver	200,000^{‡}
^{‡} Sales+streaming figures based on certification alone.

== Release history ==
Region	Date	Format(s)	Label(s)	Ref.
United Kingdom	24 April 2006	CD	Manifesto; Globe	
Canada	11 July 2006	Digital download	GLOW Digital	
Australia	11 September 2006	CD	Universal Music Australia	
