= Saltwater (Chicane song) =

1999 single by Chicane

Single by Chicane featuring Máire Brennan

from the album Behind the Sun
- Released: 24 May 1999
- Studio: Modena One, Mothership (UK)
- Genre: Trance
- Length: 10:03 (original mix); 3:29 (original radio edit)
- Label: Xtravaganza
- Songwriters: Nick Bracegirdle; Ciarán Brennan; Pól Brennan; Máire Brennan (English-Irish translation)
- Producers: Nick Bracegirdle; Ray Hedges

Chicane singles chronology
"Strong in Love" (1998)	"Saltwater" (1999)	"Don't Give Up" (2000)

Alternative cover
- 2012 re-release cover

"Saltwater" is a song by English musician Chicane featuring the vocals of Irish singer Moya Brennan. The track uses parts of Clannad's 1982 hit "Theme from Harry's Game" with both re-recorded and newly written lyrics.

It was released as a single in May 1999, reaching the number-six position on the UK Singles Chart and becoming a popular trance track in clubs across Europe. In 2003, the song was used in a national tourism campaign for Ireland and also by Belfast City Council in adverts promoting the city.

== Critical reception ==
Upon its release, Billboard highlighted “Saltwater” as “an absolute highlight” of Chicane’s second album and praised the track’s “lush trance-speckled” production and singled out the “melancholic voice of Clannad’s Máire Brennan” as central to its appeal.

== Music video ==
Filmed in February 1999, the music video for "Saltwater" juxtaposes calm surfing footage, which was shot in Woolacombe, North Devon, where many beaches that are popular surfer destinations are located, with frenzied nightclub footage, which was shot at a studio on Old Street in London as well as at the actual Gatecrasher One club in Sheffield (known as "The Republic" at the time).

== Formats and track listings ==
"Saltwater"
A 30 second sample of "Saltwater" utilizing vocals from the Clannad song "Theme from Harry's Game"

"Theme from Harry's Game"
A 30 second sample of "Theme from Harry's Game" demonstrating the original version of the vocals used in "Saltwater"

UK CD single

1. "Saltwater" (original radio edit)
2. "Saltwater" (original mix)
3. "Saltwater" (Mothership mix)

UK 12-inch single

A. "Saltwater" (original mix) – 9:49
B. "Saltwater" (Tomski vs. Disco Citizens remix) – 8:45

UK cassette single

1. "Saltwater" (original radio edit)
2. "Saltwater" (Mothership mix)

European CD single

1. "Saltwater" (original edit)
2. "Saltwater" (original mix)

Australian CD single

1. "Saltwater" (original edit)
2. "Saltwater" (original mix)
3. "Saltwater" (Mothership mix)
4. "Saltwater" (Tomski vs. Disco Citizens remix)

US maxi-CD single

1. "Saltwater" (original mix) – 9:48
2. "Saltwater" (Tomski vs. Disco Citizens remix) – 9:08
3. "Don't Give Up" (Peter Rauhofer Roxy Anthem) – 10:00
4. "Don't Give Up" (Johnny Vicious club mix) – 9:31
5. "Autumn Tactics" (Chicane's End of Summer remix) – 8:41

US 12-inch single

A1. "Saltwater" (original mix) – 9:48
A2. "Halcyon" (Airscape remix) – 7:00
B1. "Saltwater" (Tomski vs. Disco Citizens remix) – 9:08
B2. "Autumn Tactics" (Thrillseekers remix) – 8:07

== Charts ==
=== Weekly charts ===
Weekly chart performance for "Saltwater"
Chart (1999–2000)	Peak position
Australia (ARIA)	31
Belgium (Ultratop 50 Flanders)	5
Belgium (Ultratop 50 Wallonia)	24
Belgium Dance (Ultratop Flanders)	1
Europe (Eurochart Hot 100)	29
Germany (GfK)	16
Iceland (Íslenski Listinn Topp 40)	39
Ireland (IRMA)	14
Netherlands (Dutch Top 40)	25
Netherlands (Single Top 100)	23
Scottish Singles Sales (Official Charts)	4
Spain (Promusicae)	19
Switzerland (Schweizer Hitparade)	32
UK Singles (Official Charts)	6
UK Dance (Official Charts)	1
US Dance Singles Sales (Billboard)	18

=== Year-end charts ===
Year-end chart performance for "Saltwater"
Chart (1999)	Position
Belgium (Ultratop 50 Flanders)	34
Belgium (Ultratop 50 Wallonia)	98
Germany (Media Control)	86
Netherlands (Dutch Top 40)	163
UK Singles (OCC)	106
UK Club Chart (Music Week)	16
UK Pop (Music Week)	17

== Certifications ==
Certifications for "Saltwater"
Region	Certification	Certified units/sales
Belgium (BRMA)	Gold	25,000^{*}
United Kingdom (BPI)	Platinum	600,000^{‡}
^{*} Sales figures based on certification alone.^{‡} Sales+streaming figures based on certification alone.
