= Átta =

Studio album by Sigur Rós
- Released: 16 June 2023
- Studios: Sundlaugin, Mosfellsbær, Iceland; Abbey Road, London, England
- Genres: Post-rock, modern classical
- Length: 56:34
- Labels: Von Dur; BMG
- Producers: Sigur Rós; Paul Corley

Sigur Rós chronology
Odin's Raven Magic (2020)	Átta (2023)

Singles from Átta
- 1. "Blóðberg" Released: 12 June 2023

Átta (lit. 'Eight') is the eighth studio album by Icelandic post-rock band Sigur Rós, released through Von Dur and BMG Rights Management on 16 June 2023. It is their first studio album in 10 years, following Kveikur (2013), and is their first since 2012's Valtari to feature keyboardist Kjartan Sveinsson, who rejoined the band in 2022.

The seven-minute lead single "Blóðberg" was released on 12 June 2023 alongside its music video, directed by Johan Renck. Physical editions of the album were released on 1 September 2023. The band embarked on a tour from June to August 2023 backed by a 41-piece orchestra, during which they debuted songs from the album.

== Background and recording ==
The band announced in February 2022 that they were working on their eighth studio album after keyboardist Kjartan Sveinsson rejoined the band. Jónsi explained that when Sveinsson rejoined the band, Sveinsson came to visit him in Los Angeles, where they jammed and wrote together in Jónsi's basement. After he left, the COVID-19 pandemic happened, and it took two years before Sveinsson met up with Jónsi in Los Angeles again, after which point Georg Hólm joined them "and it became more of an album". All three then travelled to Abbey Road Studios in London, where they recorded with the London Contemporary Orchestra, led by conductor Robert Ames. The band also recorded at their Sundlaugin studio in Iceland and multiple studios in the US.

Jónsi said the band's intention with the music was "to have minimal drums and for the music to be really sparse, floaty and beautiful". They produced the album alongside Paul Corley. The album was also inspired by a "desire for a feeling of unity when overwhelmed by the tumultuous circumstances", with Hólm stating that the album "feels like a balming and unifying bond", calling it "more introverted than before. It's very expansive with this sound of strings, but it looks within more than outside".

== Cover art ==
The album's artwork, depicting a rainbow in flames, was designed by the Icelandic artist Rúrí. Jónsi said of it, "Trans and queer and gay rights have been trampled on so much recently. It's scary to see. Around the world also, it feels like we're going backwards. We try to stay out of politics, just to make the music as neutral as possible, but we were talking about the state of the world we live in now: climate change and doomscrolling."

== Critical reception ==
Professional ratings
Aggregate scores
Source	Rating
AnyDecentMusic?	7.9/10
Metacritic	82/100
Review scores
Source	Rating
AllMusic	4.5/5 stars
The Arts Desk	5/5 stars
Beats Per Minute	85%
Clash	8/10
Exclaim!	8/10
The Guardian	3/5 stars
NME	4/5 stars
Paste	8.4/10
Pitchfork	7.2/10
Sputnikmusic	3.4/5

Átta received a score of 82 out of 100 on review aggregator Metacritic based on thirteen critics' reviews, indicating "universal acclaim". Robin Murray of Clash stated that Átta "pick[s] up where [Sigur Rós] left off, producing works [of] outstanding beauty – slow of pace, yet rich in feeling; deftly experimental yet also daringly melodic" and that it "presents something of an oasis of calm" with tracks "allowed to stretch out and recede". Murray called the final track, "8", "remarkable" with its "sense of subtle daring seem[ing] to epitomise both the album as a whole and the band themselves". Andrew Trendell of NME called it "a welcome comeback" and "entirely at odds with the violent, industrial and anti-commercial 2013 predecessor Kveikur". He concluded that it is "at least the band's best album since 2005's monolithic Takk made them a household name, and at most a record that gives Sigur Rós plenty more reason to exist in adding some pure and natural soul to this cold and unfeeling world".

MusicOMH's John Murphy felt that Átta "ebbs and flows magnificently" and "still very much sounds like a Sigur Rós album". He also remarked that "the absence of Dýrason's drums is noticeable" and that it is ultimately "an album which demands to be listened to in its entirety". Devon Chodzin of Paste concurred that the album "requir[es] a continuous listen back-to-front". He added, "while the music is, as one might expect, beautiful, there are hints of torment and desolation that are hard to ignore" and found that the presence of an orchestra "helps their sound grow even more massive".

Ian Cohen of Pitchfork wrote that Átta "proves that Sigur Rós are physically capable of making angry music—but they aim for the softer, more poignant variants: despair, depression, and dejection" and throughout, the band "make the distinction between ambient and classical for people who might not otherwise listen to either of these forms. This is minimal music often performed maximally". Phil Mongredien of The Guardian wrote that with strings "very much foregrounded, [the songs] tend towards slowly unfurling ambient washes of sound" and while "the effect is undeniably beautiful", Mongredien argued "there's a disappointing homogeneity" that makes the album feel "cloying" and "surprisingly unengaging". Writing for AllMusic, Marcy Donelson concluded that "while not the project's most mind-bending or boundary-pushing album, it's their most stunningly gorgeous, and a successful, timely countermeasure to the symbolic cover art depicting a rainbow in flames."

== Track listing ==
All tracks are written by Jón Birgisson, Georg Hólm, and Kjartan Sveinsson.

Átta track listing
No.	Title	Length
1.	"Glóð" (Ember)	3:39
2.	"Blóðberg" (Creeping thyme)	7:16
3.	"Skel" (Shell)	4:58
4.	"Klettur" (Cliff)	6:31
5.	"Mór" (Moor)	5:47
6.	"Andrá"	4:07
7.	"Gold"	5:13
8.	"Ylur" (Warmth)	5:55
9.	"Fall"	3:27
10.	"8"	9:41
Total length:		56:34

== Personnel ==
Sigur Rós

- Jón Birgisson – vocals, guitar, string arrangement, production, engineering (all tracks); synthesizer (tracks 1, 4–7, 10)
- Georg Hólm – bass guitar, string arrangement, production, engineering (all tracks); synthesizer (1)
- Kjartan Sveinsson – piano, string arrangement, production, engineering (all tracks); synthesizer (1, 3–5, 10), harpsichord (6); hurdy-gurdy, vibraphone (7)

Additional musicians

- London Contemporary Orchestra (Note: The London Contemporary Orchestra consists of: cellists David Lale, Laura Moody, Max Ruisi, Nathaniel Boyd, Patrick Johnson, and Reinoud Ford; double bassists Eloise Riddell, Gwen Reed, Nicola Davenport, and Siret Lust; and violists Alison D'Souza, Freya Hicks, James Heron, Jennifer Wilkinson, Jordan Bergmans, Lowri Thomas, and Matthew Kettle.) – orchestra (1–8, 10)
- Robert Ames – orchestra conductor (1–8, 10)
- Ólafur Ólafsson – percussion (1, 7, 9, 10)
- Ingi Erlendsson – trombone, tuba (4, 10)
- Helgi Jónsson – trombone (4, 10)
- Eirikur Ólafsson – trumpet (4, 10)
- Snorri Sigurðarson – trumpet (4, 10)
- María Sigfúsdóttir – violin (4, 10)

Technical

- Paul Corley – production, engineering
- Ted Jensen – mastering
- Birgir Jón Birgisson – engineering
- Chris Bolster – engineering
- Farrokh Shroff – engineering
- Freddie Light – engineering
- Ivan Handwerk – engineering
- Nate Haessly – engineering
- PJ Munley – engineering
- Zack Zajdel – engineering

== Charts ==
Chart performance for Átta
Chart (2023)	Peak position
Australian Vinyl Albums (ARIA)	8
Austrian Albums (Ö3 Austria)	41
Belgian Albums (Ultratop Flanders)	5
Belgian Albums (Ultratop Wallonia)	14
Dutch Albums (Album Top 100)	38
French Albums (SNEP)	51
German Albums (Offizielle Top 100)	5
Italian Albums (FIMI)	18
Japanese Digital Albums (Oricon)	25
Japanese Hot Albums (Billboard Japan)	93
Polish Albums (ZPAV)	98
Portuguese Albums (AFP)	10
Scottish Albums (Official Charts)	6
Spanish Albums (Promusicae)	42
Swiss Albums (Schweizer Hitparade)	7
UK Albums (Official Charts)	30
UK Independent Albums (Official Charts)	2
UK Progressive Albums (Official Charts)	2
US Top Album Sales (Billboard)	11
US World Albums (Billboard)	8

== Release history ==
Release history and formats for Átta
Region	Date	Format(s)	Label	Ref.
Various	16 June 2023	Digital download; streaming	Von Dur; BMG	
Various	1 September 2023	CD; vinyl	Von Dur; BMG	
