= Kveikur (song) =

2013 song by Sigur Rós

Song by Sigur Rós

from the album Kveikur
- Recorded: 2012
- Studio: Sundlaugin Studio (Mosfellsbær, Iceland)
- Genre: Alternative rock, post-rock, industrial rock
- Length: 5:56
- Label: XL Recordings
- Songwriter(s): Jón Þór Birgisson, Orri Páll Dýrason, Georg Hólm
- Producer(s): Sigur Rós

Music video
- "Kveikur" on Vimeo

The music video features re-purposed footage from the BFI National Archive.

"Kveikur" (Icelandic for "Fuse", or "Candlewick" pronounced [ˈkveikʏr]) is a song written and recorded by Icelandic post-rock band Sigur Rós for their seventh studio album of the same name. It appears as the sixth track on the album. The song appeared on the Icelandic Tónlist chart in the week of the release of Kveikur, thanks to strong digital sales of the album, which debuted at No. 1 on the Tonlist album charts. The song peaked at No. 45.

A live version of the song, recorded during the Sigur Rós World Tour, was released as a promotional single on commercial music streaming service Spotify on July 11, 2013 as part of a three-week promotional deal which saw live recordings of Kveikur songs being released on Spotify each week.

== Live performances ==
"Kveikur", along with "Hrafntinna", "Yfirborð" and "Brennisteinn", was one of four tracks played from Kveikur during the Sigur Rós World Tour to be played before the release of the album. It was first played at the Coliseu do Porto in Porto, Portugal on February 13, 2013, and, like its album counterparts, has become a staple part of the setlist for the rest of the tour, usually appearing near the beginning or at the middle of a setlist.

Out of the entire Kveikur album, "Kveikur" was the only song to be played live on commercial networks. Sigur Rós made their first television appearance in nearly a decade, performing the song on the March 23, 2013 airing NBC late-night talk show Late Night with Jimmy Fallon. The band also made appearance performing the song on the May 24, 2013 airing of NBC late-night talk show The Tonight Show with Jay Leno.

== Music video ==
A video for "Kveikur" to be used as a backdrop for the song when it was played on the Sigur Rós World Tour was created. Directed by Sarah Hopper and edited by Damian Hale, the video features re-purposed footage taken from the British Film Institute's National Archive, which includes stock film of a traveling horse, film taken from a British convoy crossing the Rhine during World War II and archived footage of the British nuclear tests at Maralinga and other Australian-based tests during the former stages of the Cold War.

The video, implementing the studio recording of "Kveikur", as heard in the album, was released to the general public for viewing on YouTube and Vimeo on June 10, 2013, a week before the album's release in an effort to further promote the album after the single releases of "Brennisteinn" and "Ísjaki". The video was removed from social media by the band when the album was released on June 17, 2013, roughly seven days after the video was made available, however, the video is still available to view through favorited videos by other channels on Vimeo.

== Track listing ==
Stream
No.	Title	Length
1.	"Kveikur" (Live)	5:24

== Personnel ==
Adapted from Kveikur liner notes.

Sigur Rós

- Jón Þór Birgisson – vocals, guitar
- Georg Hólm – bass
- Orri Páll Dýrason – drums

Additional musicians

- Eiríkur Orri Ólafsson – brass arrangement
- Daníel Bjarnason – string arrangement
- Sigrún Jónsdóttir – brass
- Eiríkur Orri Ólafsson – brass
- Bergrún Snæbjörnsdóttir – brass
- Borgar Magnason – strings
- Margrét Árnadóttir – strings
- Pálína Árnadóttir – strings
- Una Sveinbjarnardóttir – strings
- Þórunn Ósk Marinósdóttir – strings

Additional personnel

- Ted Jensen – mastering
- Rich Costey – mixing
- Alex Somers – mixing, recording
- Elisabeth Carlsson – assistant mixing
- Eric Isip – assistant mixing
- Chris Kasych – assistant mixing
- Laura Sisk – assistant mixing
- Birgir Jón Birgisson – recording
- Valgeir Sigurdsson – recording (strings)

== Charts ==
=== Weekly charts ===
Chart (2013)	Peak position
Iceland (Tónlist)	45

== Release history ==
Region	Date	Format	Label
Australia	July 11, 2013	Stream	XL Recordings
Iceland	July 11, 2013	Stream	XL Recordings
United Kingdom	July 11, 2013	Stream	XL Recordings
United States	July 11, 2013	Stream	XL Recordings
