= Stormur =

Promotional single by Sigur Rós

from the album Kveikur
- Released: September 9, 2013
- Genre: Post-rock
- Length: 3:45
- Label: XL Recordings
- Songwriter(s): Jón Þór Birgisson, Orri Páll Dýrason, Georg Hólm
- Producer(s): Jón Þór Birgisson, Orri Páll Dýrason, Georg Hólm

Sigur Rós singles chronology
Isjaki (2013)	Stormur (2013)	Rafstraumur (Cyril Hahn Remix) (2013)

"Stormur" (Icelandic for "Storm") is a song written and recorded by Icelandic post-rock band Sigur Rós for their seventh studio album Kveikur. It appears as the fifth track on the album. The song was released on September 9, 2013 to UK mainstream radio as a promotional single from Kveikur.

== Usage in media ==
"Stormur" has so far been used once in commercial media. The song was used in a commercial for the 2013 iTunes Festival, a month-long music festival which took place at The Roundhouse in London from September 2 to October 1, 2013. Sigur Rós themselves performed at the festival on September 3, 2013 as the second headline act of the festival, with the performance being streamed live worldwide, and available to replay for free on the iTunes Store.

== Music video ==
An interactive music video for "Stormur" was debuted by the band on August 5, 2013. The interactive video invited fans of the band on online photo-sharing, video-sharing and social networking service Instagram to submit videos, made through Instagram, to be featured in an interactive "ever-evolving" and "always altering" fan-made music video for "Stormur". Fans can create and upload any video, and add the hashtag "#stormur" to enter the cycle of constantly updated loops for the video to play. As of current, the project is still in operation, and the video itself has not yet closed production.

The video itself featured numerous Instagram videos from various users that are randomly generated into the video, with two clips being shown each time. With the clips being randomly generated, there is no singular music video for "Stormur", as the video will generate a brand new set of user-submitted videos if the video is replayed, thus creating a unique music video for each person who views the same video.

== Track listing ==
UK promotional single
No.	Title	Length
1.	"Stormur"	3:45

== Personnel ==
Adapted from the Kveikur liner notes.

Sigur Rós

- Jón Þór Birgisson – vocals, guitar
- Georg Hólm – bass
- Orri Páll Dýrason – drums

Additional musicians

- Eiríkur Orri Ólafsson – brass arrangement
- Daníel Bjarnason – string arrangement
- Sigrún Jónsdóttir – brass
- Eiríkur Orri Ólafsson – brass
- Bergrún Snæbjörnsdóttir – brass
- Borgar Magnason – strings
- Margrét Árnadóttir – strings
- Pálína Árnadóttir – strings
- Una Sveinbjarnardóttir – strings
- Þórunn Ósk Marinósdóttir – strings

Additional personnel

- Ted Jensen – mastering
- Rich Costey – mixing
- Alex Somers – mixing, recording
- Elisabeth Carlsson – assistant mixing
- Eric Isip – assistant mixing
- Chris Kasych – assistant mixing
- Laura Sisk – assistant mixing
- Birgir Jón Birgisson – recording
- Valgeir Sigurdsson – recording (strings)

== Release history ==
Region	Date	Format	Label	Catalog No.
United Kingdom	September 9, 2013	CD-R (Contemporary hit radio	XL Recordings	n/a
