= Kveikur =

Studio album by Sigur Rós
- Released: 12 June 2013
- Recorded: 2012–2013
- Studio: Sundlaugin (Mosfellsbær, Iceland); Eldorado (Burbank, California); Pacifique (Hollywood, California)
- Genre: Post-rock; dream pop; industrial rock
- Length: 48:22
- Label: XL
- Producer: Sigur Rós; Kjartan Sveinsson; Alex Somers

Sigur Rós chronology
Valtari (2012)	Kveikur (2013)	Odin's Raven Magic (2020)

Singles from Kveikur
- 1. "Brennisteinn" Released: 25 March 2013; 2. "Ísjaki" Released: 24 April 2013; 3. "Stormur" Released: 9 September 2013; 4. "Rafstraumur" Released: 18 November 2013

Kveikur (pronounced [ˈkveikʏr], fuse or candlewick) is the seventh studio album from Icelandic post-rock band Sigur Rós. It was released 12 June 2013 in Japan, on 17 June internationally, and on 18 June in the United States through XL Recordings. It is the only album to be fully released through XL after the band departed EMI and Parlophone during the label's acquisition by Universal Music Group in 2012. It is the only album since their debut, Von, not to feature Kjartan Sveinsson, following his departure in 2012 (instead featured as the album's co-producer), and the last to feature drummer Orri Páll Dýrason before his departure in 2018. The cover is a photo by the Brazilian artist Lygia Clark.

== Composition ==
Kveikur sees a new direction taken by Sigur Rós, both musically and thematically. The band has described the album's sound as "more aggressive" than any of their previous works. All tracks are sung in Icelandic, although Yfirborð contains some reversed words at the start, which can be considered Hopelandic.

== Promotion ==
Kveikur was officially unveiled by the band and label XL Recordings on 22 March 2013. The album's details, such as artwork, tracklist, and release date, were publicly announced, along with dates for the band's corresponding tour. An EP, entitled Brennisteinn and featuring lead single "Brennisteinn" and two Kveikur cuts "Hryggjarsula" and "Ofbirta", was also released on the same day to ticket holders of North American dates on the Sigur Rós World Tour. On the 11th of June the album was made available to stream live in its entirety online.

=== Singles ===
"Brennisteinn" was released as the lead single from Kveikur on 25 March 2013. The eight-minute music video for the song, directed by Andrew Huang, was released three days earlier during Kveikur's unveiling on March 22.

"Ísjaki" was released as a radio-only single from the album a month later on 24 April 2013. The song was also released early for download on iTunes through Kveikur's listing, before the album was released in June. The band also released an accompanying lyric video for the song on their YouTube channel on 2 April. The video is also notably the band's first lyric video for a song since the band's formation in 1994.

=== Tour ===
The band embarked on the Sigur Rós World Tour in late 2012 and throughout 2013 in promotion of Kveikur. The 82-date tour visited Australia, South-East and East Asia, Europe and North America. The North American leg of the tour, which occurred in March and April, was supported by Oneohtrix Point Never and Tim Hecker. During the former legs of the tour, Kveikur tracks "Kveikur", "Yfirborð", "Hrafntinna", and "Brennisteinn" had been played live. The band performed "Kveikur" on NBC late night talk show Late Night with Jimmy Fallon during the tour on 22 March 2013.

== Reception ==
Professional ratings
Aggregate scores
Source	Rating
AnyDecentMusic?	7.6/10
Metacritic	80/100
Review scores
Source	Rating
AllMusic	4/5 stars
The A.V. Club	B+
The Guardian	4/5 stars
The Independent	4/5 stars
Los Angeles Times	2.5/4 stars
NME	8/10
Pitchfork	8.1/10
Q	4/5 stars
Rolling Stone	3.5/5 stars
Spin	8/10

=== Critical reception ===
Kveikur was met with generally positive reviews upon release. At Metacritic, which assigns a normalized rating out of 100 to reviews from mainstream critics, the album received an average score of 80, which indicates "generally favorable reviews", based on 36 reviews.

Gregory Haney of AllMusic complimented the band's efforts, writing that "Post-rock can be an awfully passive listening experience, sweeping the listeners up in drifting buildup and inevitable crescendos without ever really confronting them. Challenging this paradigm, Sigur Rós get sonically adventurous with their seventh album, Kveikur, which finds the Icelandic three-piece delivering a darker and more aggressive sound on one of their most daring albums to date." Gareth James of Clash praised the diversity of the music on Kveikur: "No two songs sound similar and, while Jónsi's vocals confirm that this is, really, the artist on the album sleeve, it is far from more of the same."

Christian Cottingham of Drowned in Sound in his positive review of the album praised both the originality and lack of commercialism in Kveikur. He stated, "With Kveikur, Sigur Rós seem to be shrinking from the light, away from the TV adverts and the Top Gear soundtracks, the Shia LaBeouf videos and the Daily Mail articles and the Hollywood movies. And that's a good thing: for an alternative group from Iceland that veer between their native tongue and a made-up language they were becoming all too ubiquitous, and far less interesting with it – heck, when your own webstore starts selling candles 'specially developed to the band's olfactory specifications' it's definitely time for something new. For too long – arguably since 2005's Takk... – Sigur Rós have been making music to cry to, to make love to, to meditate or pray or wind down to, music for lonely walks or misty hikes, for sunrise and sunset and solstice, for children to sleep to and people to wake up to (disclosure: "Hoppípolla" is my alarm tone…) – music to sift into the background, unobtrusive, a wallpaper for the postcard Iceland, beautiful but safe. Well, here's the flipside, that long Scandinavian winter of frostbite and storms, of frozen rock and suicides, the Northern Lights cast overhead not dancing but shivering, particles undulating sinisterly against blackened skies and all the better for it."

Complementary to Cottingham's review, NME also praised the lack of commercialism and noted the album's shock factor: "This is an album no-one anticipated Sigur Rós would make. This is a band whose frontman now scores Hollywood films (Cameron Crowe's We Bought A Zoo), whose household name status was confirmed when they recently cameoed on The Simpsons, who in recent years have dealt more in bright, bouncy orchestral indie (2008's Arcade Fire-ish Með suð í eyrum við spilum endalaust) than the dark experimental fare they made their name with. So Kveikur comes as a violent but welcome surprise."

Sash Geffen of Consequence of Sound gave a positive review of the album, but noted its lack of emotionally driven creativity in comparison to earlier Sigur Rós albums like Ágætis byrjun and ( ). She wrote, "While energized, Kveikur doesn't break away from Sigur Rós' safe spots. Those who have followed the band down the same trails for years will happily be able to do so again. But those who are still hungry for the thickets of Ágætis byrjun or the haunted tundra of Von won't find many new landmarks here. This is a dark, warm, safe space for Sigur Rós and their devotees. Don't expect to lose your way." Pitchfork also noted but excused this, praising the album for standing on its own: "Even if it doesn't have the same cultivated mystery or incapacitating demands of Ágætis byrjun or ( ), Kveikur is every bit a return to form, tapping into its predecessors' bottomless emotional wellspring for a Sigur Rós album that can be listened to casually or intensely, a collection that works as effectively as a spiritual experience and pop music, the essence of their overwhelming, widescreen grandeur conveyed with the immediacy of a 50-minute rock record."

=== Commercial performance ===
Kveikur debuted at number 14 on the US Billboard 200 with sales of 22,831 copies.

== Track listing ==
All tracks are written by Jón Þór Birgisson, Georg Hólm, Orri Páll Dýrason.

No.	Title	English translation	Length
1.	"Brennisteinn"	Brimstone	7:45
2.	"Hrafntinna"	Obsidian	6:24
3.	"Ísjaki"	Iceberg	5:04
4.	"Yfirborð"	Surface	4:20
5.	"Stormur"	Storm	4:56
6.	"Kveikur"	Fuse/Candlewick	5:56
7.	"Rafstraumur"	Electrical Current	4:59
8.	"Bláþráður"	Blue Thread	5:13
9.	"Var"	Was/Shelter	3:45
Total length:			48:22

Japanese bonus tracks
No.	Title	English translation	Length
10.	"Hryggjarsúla"	Backbone	5:05
11.	"Ofbirta"	Overexposure	4:12
Total length:			57:39

Vinyl only bonus 10"
No.	Title	English translation	Length
1.	"Hryggjarsúla"	Backbone	5:05
2.	"Ofbirta"	Overexposure	4:12
3.	"Brennisteinn" (Blanck Mass Remix)	Brimstone	10:40
Total length:			19:57

== Personnel ==
Adapted from Kveikur liner notes.

Sigur Rós

- Jón Þór Birgisson – vocals, guitar
- Georg Hólm – bass
- Orri Páll Dýrason – drums

Additional musicians

- Eiríkur Orri Ólafsson – brass arrangement
- Daníel Bjarnason – string arrangement
- Sigrún Jónsdóttir – brass
- Eiríkur Orri Ólafsson – brass
- Bergrún Snæbjörnsdóttir – brass
- Borgar Magnason – strings
- Margrét Árnadóttir – strings
- Pálína Árnadóttir – strings
- Una Sveinbjarnardóttir – strings
- Þórunn Ósk Marinósdóttir – strings

Additional personnel

- Ted Jensen – mastering
- Rich Costey – mixing
- Alex Somers – mixing, recording
- Elisabeth Carlsson – assistant mixing
- Eric Isip – assistant mixing
- Chris Kasych – assistant mixing
- Laura Sisk – assistant mixing
- Birgir Jón Birgisson – recording
- Kjartan Sveinsson – assistant producing, mixing
- Alex Somers – assistant producing
- Valgeir Sigurdsson – recording (strings)

== Charts ==
=== Weekly charts ===
Weekly chart performance for Kveikur
Chart (2013)	Peak position
Australian Albums (ARIA)	17
Belgian Albums (Ultratop Flanders)	8
Belgian Albums (Ultratop Wallonia)	41
Finnish Albums (Suomen virallinen lista)	18
Irish Albums (IRMA)	6
Italian Albums (FIMI)	13
Dutch Albums (Album Top 100)	20
New Zealand Albums (RMNZ)	34
Norwegian Albums (VG-lista)	6
Portuguese Albums (AFP)	4
Spanish Albums (PROMUSICAE)	25
UK Albums (OCC)	9

=== Year-end charts ===
2013 year-end chart performance for Kveikur
Chart (2013)	Position
Belgian Albums (Ultratop Flanders)	128
Icelandic Albums (Tónlist)	5

== Release history ==
Region	Date	Format	Label
Japan	12 June 2013	Digital download, CD, Blu-spec, LP	Hostess Entertainment
Australia	14 June 2013	Digital download, CD, LP	XL Recordings
Belgium	14 June 2013	Digital download, CD, LP	XL Recordings
Finland	14 June 2013	Digital download, CD, LP	XL Recordings
Germany	14 June 2013	Digital download, CD, LP	XL Recordings
Iceland	14 June 2013	Digital download, CD, LP	XL Recordings
Republic of Ireland	14 June 2013	Digital download, CD, LP	XL Recordings
Netherlands	14 June 2013	Digital download, CD, LP	XL Recordings
New Zealand	14 June 2013	Digital download, CD, LP	XL Recordings
France	17 June 2013	Digital download, CD, LP	XL Recordings
Italy	17 June 2013	Digital download, CD, LP	XL Recordings
South Africa	17 June 2013	Digital download, CD, LP	XL Recordings
United Kingdom	17 June 2013	Digital download, CD, LP	XL Recordings
Canada	18 June 2013	Digital download, CD, LP	XL Recordings
United States	18 June 2013	Digital download, CD, LP	XL Recordings
