= Brennisteinn =

Single by Sigur Rós

from the album Kveikur
- Released: March 25, 2013
- Recorded: 2012
- Studio: Sundlaugin Studio (Mosfellsbær, Iceland)
- Genre: Post-rock; industrial rock
- Length: 7:56
- Label: XL
- Songwriters: Jón Þór Birgisson; Orri Páll Dýrason; Georg Hólm
- Producers: Jón Þór Birgisson; Orri Páll Dýrason; Georg Hólm; Kjartan Sveinsson; Menelik Eu'el Solomon

Sigur Rós singles chronology
"Varúð" (2012)	"Brennisteinn" (2013)	"Ísjaki" (2013)

Music video
- "Brennisteinn" on YouTube

"Brennisteinn" (Icelandic for "Brimstone", pronounced /ˈprɛnːɪˌsteitn/) is a song written and recorded by Icelandic post-rock band Sigur Rós for their seventh studio album Kveikur. It appears as the opening track on the album. "Brennisteinn" was released as the lead single from the album on March 25, 2013, after the album's official unveiling three days earlier.

== Reception ==
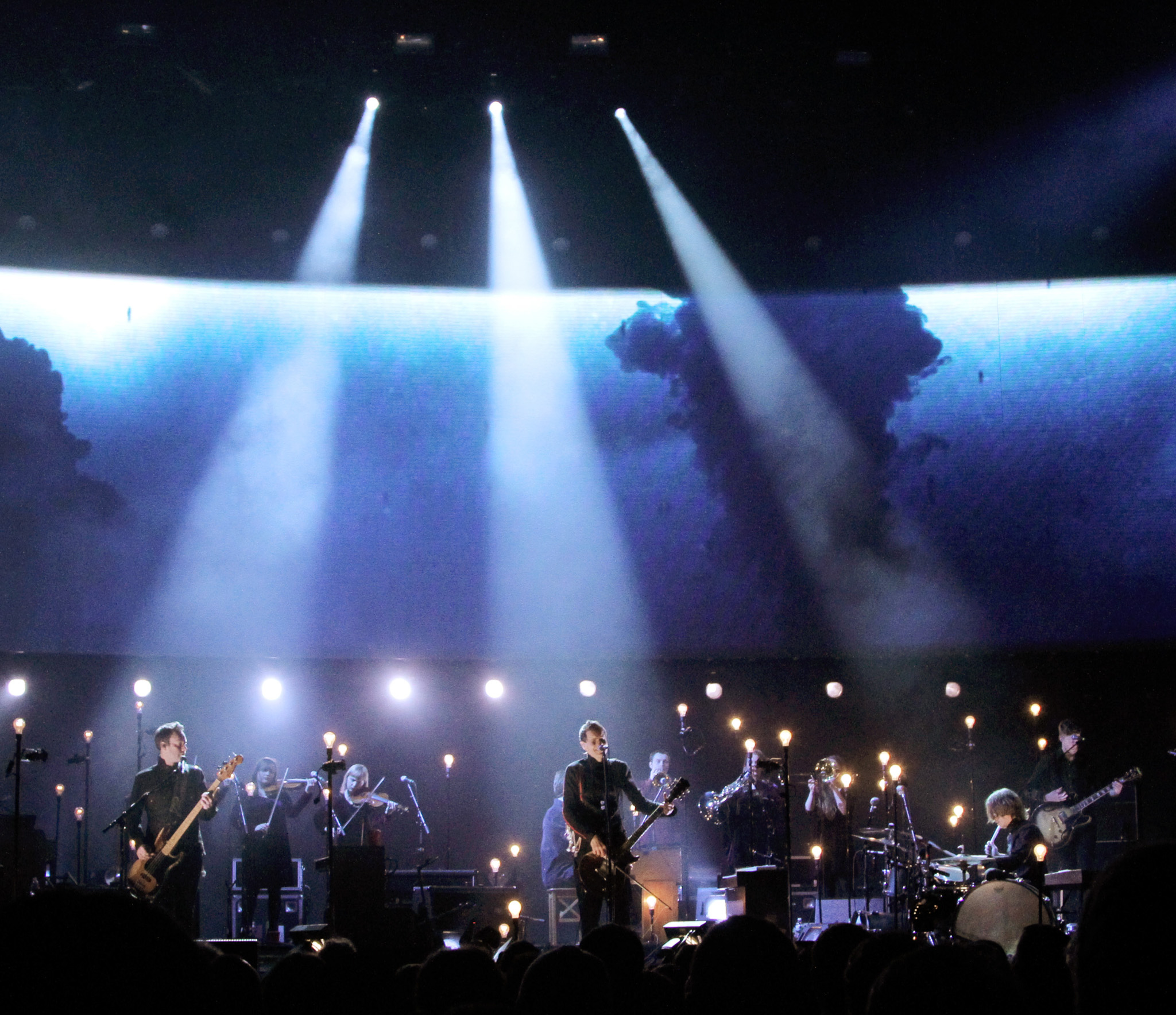
Sigur Rós performing during the Sigur Rós World Tour in 2013.

"Brennisteinn" was released to overwhelmingly positive reception. Ian Cohen of Pitchfork compared the track to the sounds of the band's second and third studio albums Ágætis Byrjun and ( ), stating that "Though their earliest work constitutes some of the most beautiful and ethereal music of the past two decades, Ágætis Byrjun and ( ), are heavy records with doom-friendly song lengths and tempos. "Brennisteinn", then, is a big payoff in that regard." He further calls the track a "heaven/hell juxtaposition" that "feels like the most logical step imaginable for Sigur Rós in light of last year's Valtari, a Calgon bath of a record that suggested that the band had run out of ideas." Grayson Hale of Sputnikmusic stated "As just a small taste of what's to come, "Brennisteinn" certainly achieves its goal of whetting the appetite." While Hale also makes a comparison to 2002's ( ), he writes "Although no two albums of theirs sound exactly alike, this is the first time we are really hearing something of a reinvention from the group."

Jake Jenkins of the Sanctuary Review noted of the band's approach of a more "aggressive" sound, but in allusion to this he wrote that "aggressive is an understatement." He describes the track as "a menacing, lurching beast of a song that will rattle you to your core." He criticizes Jonsi's vocal performance by stating that "Jonsi's vocals typically stay in his lower register but they still sit high above the rest of the music throughout the track, though their atmospheric texture lends itself perfectly to the song, and when he does get into that upper register they don't sound out of place in the least bit." However, he goes on to give the overall song a positive review by writing "Over the course of the 7 minutes, Sigur Rós prove that they have not only stayed true to their word of exploring a more aggressive sound but proved that they could pull it off in ways that exceed all expectations. Considering they were recently reduced to a trio, the fact that they sound this huge is impressive. If the rest of Kveikur is along the same lines as "Brennisteinn", we may be getting the best Sigur Rós album since ( ).

Joe Stadele of The Way That He Sings called the song "a mammoth". He described the track as "brutal, dark, and unsettling." He writes "Like an approaching torrential storm, the song reveals itself in waves. First the pitter-patter of rain, then a thunderous buzz saw drone followed by marching stomp percussion. Yet somewhere in the darkness, Sigur Rós sprinkle rays of light amongst the orchestral storm and the song is propelled to all new heights through the falsetto vocals of Jónsi Birgisson and accompanying strings. This is easily Sigur Ros’ heaviest track to date, nodding to the bleakness of ( ), yet treading new territory for the real second coming of the newly downsized three-piece". He further complimented the band by saying "If this is any indication of the newly downsized three-piece’s new direction, Sigur Rós fans are in for a treat and true return to form."

== Live performances ==
"Brennisteinn" was first performed live in November 2012, during the Iceland Airwaves 2012 music festival, where they were the headlining act. It has also been an integral part of the band's Sigur Rós World Tour since the performance, usually appearing as the final song on the main set, before the encore performance.

== Usage in media ==
"Brennisteinn" was first used in commercial media in the E3 trailer for Ubisoft Montreal's critically acclaimed 2013 video game, Assassin's Creed IV: Black Flag.

On September 1, 2013, the track "Brennisteinn" was incorporated into the BBC's Original British Drama: 2013 special multi-series preview. The video, which aired on YouTube, included teasers from Sherlock, Ripper Street, The Escape Artist, and others.

The track was used in a commercial for Alien fragrance by French fashion brand Thierry Mugler which portrayed the awakening of Sun Goddess. The video starring Moldavian model Alexandra Tzurkan was released online internationally on 25 February 2014.

On July 25, 2014 the track was used for the Walking Dead season 5 comic-con trailer which debuted on October 12, 2014.

== Music video ==
The music video for "Brennisteinn" was released on March 22, 2013 to coincide with the official unveiling of Kveikur. Directed by Andrew Huang, who has also worked with Björk, the video lasts over eight minutes and features the band playing on an open stage, cutting back and forth between shots of the band and a narrative sequence which depicts the capture of a prisoner, his escape and chase. The entire music video is contrastless in Black-and-white photography, with a color splash effect that brings color only to patches of the video that are colored in shades of yellow and contrasting colors of yellow and green.

== Track listing ==
All tracks are written by Jón Þór Birgisson, Orri Páll Dýrason, Georg Hólm.

Digital download
No.	Title	Length
1.	"Brennisteinn"	7:56

Brennisteinn EP
No.	Title	Length
1.	"Brennisteinn"	7:56
2.	"Hryggjarsúla" ("Backbone")	5:04
3.	"Ofbirta" ("Glow")	4:12

== Personnel ==
Adapted from Kveikur liner notes.

Sigur Rós

- Jón Þór Birgisson – vocals, guitar
- Georg Hólm – bass
- Orri Páll Dýrason – drums

Additional musicians

- Eiríkur Orri Ólafsson – brass arrangement
- Daníel Bjarnason – string arrangement
- Sigrún Jónsdóttir – brass
- Eiríkur Orri Ólafsson – brass
- Bergrún Snæbjörnsdóttir – brass
- Borgar Magnason – strings
- Margrét Árnadóttir – strings
- Pálína Árnadóttir – strings
- Una Sveinbjarnardóttir – strings
- Þórunn Ósk Marinósdóttir – strings
- Menelik Eu'el Solomon – sonics

Additional personnel

- Ted Jensen – mastering
- Rich Costey – mixing
- Alex Somers – mixing, recording
- Elisabeth Carlsson – assistant mixing
- Eric Isip – assistant mixing
- Chris Kasych – assistant mixing
- Laura Sisk – assistant mixing
- Birgir Jón Birgisson – recording
- Valgeir Sigurdsson – recording (strings)

== Charts ==
Chart (2013)	Peak position
Iceland (Tónlist)	14

== Release history ==
Region	Date	Format	Label
Brennisteinn EP
United States	March 23, 2013	Digital download	XL Recordings
"Brennisteinn" single
Australia	March 25, 2013	Digital download	XL Recordings
Germany	March 25, 2013	Digital download	XL Recordings
Iceland	March 25, 2013	Digital download	XL Recordings
United Kingdom	March 25, 2013	Digital download	XL Recordings
United States	March 25, 2013	Digital download	XL Recordings
