= Puzzle (Amiina album) =

Studio album by Amiina
- Released: September 27, 2010

Amiina chronology
| Re Minore (2009) | Puzzle (2010) | The Lighthouse Project (2013) |

Singles from Puzzle
- 1. "Over & Again" Released: May 2010; 2. "What are we waiting for?" Released: September 27, 2010

Professional ratings
Review scores
| Source | Rating |
|---|---|
| HighVoltage.co.uk | (Positive) |
| Drowned in Sound | 5/10 stars |
| FutureSequence.com | (Positive) |
| TheSilentBallet.com | (Positive) |
| The Independent | 4/5 stars |
| bf2d.net | 9/10 stars |

Puzzle is the second album by the Icelandic band amiina. It was released on September 27, 2010. This album has references to the bands EP Re Minore as the tracks "Ásinn", "Púsl" and "Sicsak" are re-worked versions of the songs "Ásinn", "Þristurinn" and "Tvisturinn" from that release. Additionally, the track "Mambó" is a re-worked version of the song "Ammælis" from the "Seoul" single.

As part of the pre-order package for the album the band released a video of the band playing "Glámur" from their previous studio album, Kurr, at the Reykjavík Arts Festival from 2008. This concert was the original quartets first performance together with Magnús Trygvason Eliassen and Kippi Kaninus (Guðmundur Vignir Karlsson) and it also marks the start of their collaboration.

Two singles were released together with the album: "Over & Again" was released in May 2010 on CD containing the album track of the same name as well as a remix of "Hemipode" by Kippi Kaninus (originally from AnimaminA), and "What are we waiting for?" released in September 2010 as a digital single containing the album tracks "What are we waiting for?", "Blauwber" and "Nebula".

== Track listing ==
1. "Ásinn" – 5:34
2. "Over & Again" – 3:39
3. "What are we waiting for?" – 5:28
4. "Púsl" – 6:14
5. "In the Sun" – 4:18
6. "Mambó" – 4:56
7. "Sicsak" – 6:55
8. "Thoka" – 3:57
9. "Nebula" (Japan bonus track)
10. "Blauwber" (Japan bonus track)

== Personnel ==
Amiina is:

- Edda Rún Ólafsdóttir
- Guðmundur Vignir Karlsson
- Hildur Ársælsdóttir
- Magnús Trygvason Eliassen
- Maria Huld Markan Sigfúsdóttir
- Sólrún Sumarliðadóttir

All tracks written and performed by amiina.

Additional performers:

- Kjartan Sveinsson – bass (tracks 1, 3 and 7)
- Borgar Magnason - double bass (track 7)
- Sigtryggur Baldursson, Bryndís Nielsen, Jóhann Ágúst Jóhannsson & Inga Harðardóttir - vocals (track 6)
- Mixed by Birgir Jón Birgisson and amiina
