= The Lighthouse Project (EP) =

EP by amiina
- Released: June 7, 2013
- Label: Morr music, amínamúsik ehf.

Amiina chronology
Puzzle (2010)	The Lighthouse Project (2013)	Fantômas (2016)

Professional ratings
Review scores
Source	Rating
The Independent	4/5 stars
Iceland Review	3.5/5 stars

The Lighthouse Project is an EP by amiina from Iceland, released on June 7, 2013. The songs were originally played during a summer 2009 concert tour in Iceland where amiina played at small and unusual locations, such as the Dalatangaviti lighthouse. Except for the last song, the songs on The Lighthouse Project were recorded "live" in studio trying to reproduce the atmosphere of the original performances. The last song is a 2009 recording from the Dalatangaviti lighthouse, shown on the cover and referenced by the longitude/latitude song name. During the time leading up to the release of The Lighthouse Project the band's label released two teaser videos depicting the Icelandic landscape and eventually a full video of the band playing the first track Perth inside Dalatangaviti lighthouse.

Some of the songs, such as Hilli and Kola, originate from the band's first album Kurr, while the song Leather and Lace originally appeared on their collaboration single Hilli (At The Top Of The World) with Lee Hazlewood.

== Track listing ==
1. "Perth" – 4:02
2. "Hilli" (Lighthouse version) – 3:11
3. "Bíólagið" – 4:37
4. "Leather and Lace" – 4:07
5. "Kola" (Lighthouse version) – 5:18
6. "N65°16,21 W13°34,49" – 0:59

== Personnel ==
Amiina is:

- Edda Rún Ólafsdóttir
- Hildur Ársælsdóttir
- Maria Huld Markan Sigfúsdóttir
- Sólrún Sumarliðadóttir
- Recorded by Ben Frost, Paul Evans, Birgir Jón Birgisson and Kjartan Sveinsson
- Mixed by Birgir Jón Birgisson at Sundlaugin
