= Ekki múkk =

Single by Sigur Rós

from the album Valtari
- Released: March 26, 2012
- Recorded: 2011–12
- Genre: Ambient; Classical music
- Length: 7:45
- Label: Parlophone
- Songwriters: Jón Þór Birgisson; Orri Páll Dýrason; Georg Hólm; Kjartan Sveinsson
- Producer: Sigur Rós

Sigur Rós singles chronology
"Við spilum endalaust" (2008)	"Ekki múkk" (2012)	"Varúð" (2012)

Music video
- Ekki múkk on YouTube

"Ekki múkk" is the second track on Sigur Rós' sixth studio album, Valtari. It premiered on the official website as well as an accompanying video on March 26, 2012.

On Record Store Day, April 21, Sigur Rós released a 10-inch limited edition vinyl edition of "Ekki múkk" that plays inside out. Its B-side is an instrumental track titled "Kvistur". This B-side is also available as a pre-order bonus track for Valtari.

== Videos ==
A "moving art" video for "Ekki múkk" was released on March 26, 2012 on the band's official website, Vimeo, and YouTube. On September 24 the second "Ekki múkk" video was released. The short narrates the story of a man lost in the English countryside. It was directed by Nick Abrahams and featured Aidan Gillen and Shirley Collins. It won the British Council award for Best UK Short at the 10th London Short Film Festival, and it was screened as Official Selection at 'Art Basel Miami 2012', 'Clermont-Ferrand International Short Film Festival 2013'. This film for "Ekki múkk" is the tenth of the Valtari Mystery Film Experiment. "Ekki múkk" also appears on two other videos from the series: Seraph, the ninth Valtari Mystery Film, displays the track briefly at the end; and the fourteenth Valtari Mystery Film, called Valtari, plays the track at the beginning.

== Track listing ==
10" vinyl
No.	Title	Length
1.	"Ekki múkk"	7:45
2.	"Kvistur"	5:30
