= Varúð =

Single by Sigur Rós

from the album Valtari
- B-side: "Logn"
- Released: August 21, 2012
- Recorded: 2011–12
- Genre: Ambient, new age
- Length: 4:18 (radio edit); 6:36 (album version)
- Label: XL Recordings
- Songwriters: Jón Þór Birgisson; Orri Páll Dýrason; Georg Hólm; Kjartan Sveinsson
- Producer: Sigur Rós

Sigur Rós singles chronology
"Ekki múkk" (2012)	"Varúð" (2012)	"Brennisteinn" (2013)

Music video
- "Varúð" on YouTube "Varúð" (Ryan McGinley) on YouTube

"Varúð" (Icelandic for "Caution") is a song written and recorded by Icelandic post-rock band Sigur Rós for their sixth studio album, Valtari. It appears as the third track on the album. The song was released as the second official single from the album on August 21, 2012 on a 10" gramophone record in support of their then-current Sigur Rós World Tour. It is also notably the first release by Sigur Rós under XL Recordings after the liquidation of EMI and the selling of its subsidiaries, including Sigur Rós' then-current label Parlophone. The song was used as a backing for an interpretive dance in the thirteenth season finale of It's Always Sunny in Philadelphia.

== Track listing ==
10"
No.	Title	Length
1.	"Varúð"	6:36
2.	"Logn"	8:14

Promotional single
No.	Title	Length
1.	"Varúð"	4:18

== Personnel ==
Sigur Rós

- Jón Þór Birgisson – vocals, guitar
- Georg Hólm – bass
- Kjartan Sveinsson – keyboard, piano
- Orri Páll Dýrason – drums

== Charts ==
Chart (2012)	Peak position
Belgium (Ultratip Bubbling Under Flanders)	132

== Release history ==
Region	Date	Format	Label	Catalog no.
United Kingdom	April 26, 2012	CD-R (BBC Radio 6 premiere)	Parlophone	n/a
United Kingdom	August 21, 2012	10"	XL Recordings	XLT-579
United States	August 21, 2012	10"	XL Recordings	B009159HA4
