= Re Minore =

EP by amiina
- Released: June 2009
- Recorded: 2009
- Length: 19:10
- Label: Bláskjár Records

Amiina chronology
Kurr (2007)	Re Minore (2009)	Puzzle (2010)

Re Minore is an EP from the Icelandic string quartet amiina that was released during their 2009 tour. The title is Italian for D minor.

Amiina have previously worked with Kippi Kaninus who also accompany the band on the EP together with Kjartan Sveinsson. The EP is limited to 500 copies and the music was recorded at Sigur Rós' Sundlaugin studio in Iceland together with Birgir Jón Birgisson. The band's second studio album Puzzle features reworked versions of the songs on Re Minore.

== Track listing ==
1. "Ásinn" – 5:29
2. "Þristurinn" – 6:51
3. "Tvisturinn" – 6:47
