= Rafstraumur =

Single by Sigur Rós

from the album Kveikur
- Released: October 21, 2013
- Recorded: 2012–13
- Studio: Sundlaugin Studio (Mosfellsbær, Iceland)
- Genre: Post-rock
- Length: 5:03
- Label: XL Recordings
- Songwriters: Jón Þór Birgisson; Orri Páll Dýrason; Georg Hólm
- Producers: Jón Þór Birgisson; Orri Páll Dýrason; Cyril Hahn; Georg Hólm

Sigur Rós singles chronology
"Ísjaki" (2013)	"Rafstraumur" (2013)	"Óveður" (2016)

Music video
- "Rafstraumur (Cyril Hahn remix)" on YouTube

"Rafstraumur" (Icelandic for "Electric Current") is a song written by Jón Þór Birgisson, Orri Páll Dýrason, Georg Hólm of Icelandic post rock band Sigur Rós. The song was originally recorded throughout 2012 and 2013 at the Sundlaugin Studio in Mosfellsbær, Iceland for inclusion on the band's seventh studio album, Kveikur. The record appears as the seventh track on the album. The record was released to radio on November 18, 2013 as a promotional single for Kveikur.

Sigur Rós' recording of "Rafstraumur" was remixed by Canadian electronic musician Cyril Hahn, and was released as a single on October 21, 2013. A music video to promote the single was also produced and created.

== Track listing ==
Digital download
No.	Title	Length
1.	"Rafstraumur" (Cyril Hahn Remix)	5:03

UK promotional single
No.	Title	Length
1.	"Rafstraumur" (Radio)	4:06
2.	"Rafstraumur" (Original)	4:58

== Personnel ==
Adapted from Kveikur liner notes.

Sigur Rós

- Jón Þór Birgisson – vocals, guitar
- Georg Hólm – bass
- Orri Páll Dýrason – drums

Additional musicians

- Eiríkur Orri Ólafsson – brass arrangement
- Daníel Bjarnason – string arrangement
- Sigrún Jónsdóttir – brass
- Eiríkur Orri Ólafsson – brass
- Bergrún Snæbjörnsdóttir – brass
- Borgar Magnason – strings
- Margrét Árnadóttir – strings
- Pálína Árnadóttir – strings
- Una Sveinbjarnardóttir – strings
- Þórunn Ósk Marinósdóttir – strings

Additional personnel

- Ted Jensen – mastering
- Rich Costey – mixing
- Alex Somers – mixing, recording
- Elisabeth Carlsson – assistant mixing
- Eric Isip – assistant mixing
- Chris Kasych – assistant mixing
- Laura Sisk – assistant mixing
- Birgir Jón Birgisson – recording
- Valgeir Sigurdsson – recording (strings)

== Release history ==
=== Commercial ===
Country	Date	Format	Label
Australia	October 21, 2013	Digital download	XL Recordings
United Kingdom	October 21, 2013	Digital download	XL Recordings
United States	October 21, 2013	Digital download	XL Recordings

=== Promotional ===
Country	Date	Radio Format	Label	Catalog No.
United Kingdom	November 18, 2013	Contemporary hit radio; BBC Radio 1 Rotation	XL Recordings	n/a
