= Hoppípolla =

2005 song by Sigur Rós

Single by Sigur Rós

from the album Takk...
- Released: 28 November 2005
- Genre: Post-rock; art rock; dream pop; ambient
- Length: 4:36
- Label: EMI
- Songwriters: Jón Þór Birgisson; Orri Páll Dýrason; Georg Hólm; Kjartan Sveinsson
- Producers: Sigur Rós; Ken Thomas

Sigur Rós singles chronology
"Sæglópur" (2005)	"Hoppípolla" (2005)	"Sæglópur" (2006)

Music video
- "Hoppípolla" on YouTube

"Hoppípolla" (pronounced [ˈhɔʰpiˌpʰɔtl̥a]) is a song by Icelandic post-rock band Sigur Rós from their 2005 album Takk.... It was released as the album's second single on 28 November 2005. The song title is a univerbation of hoppa í polla (the -a in hoppa is not pronounced), which is Icelandic for "hopping into puddles", and the lyrics are mainly in Icelandic, with some nonsensical phrases, a "language" the band calls Vonlenska ("Hopelandic"). As with many of the band's songs, it was given a nickname in the early stages of writing. "Hoppípolla" was "The Money Song", as the band was certain they had written a song which would have commercial success.

"Hoppípolla" is the band's most successful single, charting at number 24 on the UK Singles Chart in May 2006. The song had been featured in trailers for the popular BBC television series Planet Earth, which caused the single to be re-released on 1 May 2006. The "Hoppípolla" single also features "Með blóðnasir", an instrumental coda to "Hoppípolla", which is also featured on Takk...; and a studio remake of "Hafssól", a song previously released on the band's 1997 debut album, Von. The title appears as "Hafsól" on the single.

== Track listings ==
CD (CDEM 673) / 12-inch (12EM 673)

1. "Hoppípolla" – 4:36
2. "Með blóðnasir" – 2:24
3. "Hafsól" (2005 version) – 9:47

7-inch (EM 673)

1. "Hoppípolla" – 4:36
2. "Heysátan" – 4:09

== Music video ==
A promotional music video for "Hoppípolla," directed by Arni & Kinski, was filmed in November 2005. It depicts two groups of elderly friends strolling around the suburbs of Reykjavík and acting like children; pulling pranks on people and battling with water balloons and wooden swords near a cemetery. When one old man is injured and suffers a nosebleed (as referenced in the lyrics), the opponents run away in fear, while the others celebrate their victory. The video shows several shots of the friends "hopping in puddles" of water along a path.

The band members are featured in the video: keyboardist Kjartan Sveinsson plays the victim of a Knock, Knock, Ginger trick, guitarist and vocalist Jón Þór Birgisson plays the cashier at a shop where an old man steals and eats some pears, drummer Orri Páll Dýrason can be seen repairing his bicycle, and bassist Georg Hólm can be seen cleaning.

== Charts ==
Chart (2005)	Peak position
UK Singles (The Official Charts Company)	35
Chart (2006)	Peak position
UK Singles (The Official Charts Company)	24

=== Certifications ===
Region	Certification	Certified units/sales
United Kingdom (BPI)	Silver	200,000^{‡}
^{‡} Sales+streaming figures based on certification alone.

== Chicane cover version – "Poppiholla" ==
"Poppiholla"

Single by Chicane

from the album The Best of Chicane: 1996–2008 and Giants
- Released: 13 July 2009
- Length: 3:43 (radio edit); 4:49 (original mix)
- Label: Modena; Armada
- Songwriters: Jón Þór Birgisson; Orri Páll Dýrason; Georg Hólm; Kjartan Sveinsson
- Producers: Chicane; Richard Searle

Chicane singles chronology
"Bruised Water" (2008)	"Poppiholla" (2009)	"Hiding All The Stars" (2009)

In July 2009, Chicane released an instrumental re-work of the song, titled "Poppiholla" and released it as a five track single EP on 13 July 2009. "Poppiholla" entered the UK Singles Chart at number seven on 19 July 2009, spending three weeks in the top ten as of 2 August 2009. A video to promote the song was made, and Chicane's The Best of Chicane collection was re-released to include the song. The re-released album reached number 11 on the UK Albums Chart, beating the compilation's previous peak of number 16 (without "Poppiholla" on it). The song was used in the UK by Sky Sports for their coverage of the Guinness Premiership in 2009–10.

=== Music video ===
The music video for Poppiholla is filmed in black-and-white and in slow motion. It shows a black man in a hoodie with the hood up walking the street. People in the street, including a woman at a cash point, look at him warily as he passes them. A middle aged lady openly glares at him as he walks past her door. Two men stare as he walks past them, one with a smirk on his face. As the video progresses, the man sees something in the distance, and looks shocked. He then begins running, knocking into people as he passes, one of whom drops their coffee cups everywhere. The hooded man runs past, regardless. He sees a woman in a striped top outside a pub with scaffolding, who is distracted by her cellphone. He immediately pulls her out the way, and a large bunch of breeze blocks fall down to where she was previously standing, presumably from the scaffolding. The video ends with the man now lying on the ground, exhausted but relieved that he has saved her from injury, and the woman on top of him, looking towards his face.

=== Charts ===
==== Weekly charts ====
Chart (2009)	Peak position
UK Singles (OCC)	7
UK Indie (Official Charts)	1

==== Year-end charts ====
Chart (2009)	Position
UK Singles (OCC)	136

==== Certifications ====
Region	Certification	Certified units/sales
United Kingdom (BPI)	Silver	200,000^{‡}
^{‡} Sales+streaming figures based on certification alone.

=== Release history ===
Region	Date	Format	Label
United Kingdom	13 July 2009	Digital download; CD	Modena; Armada

== Use in film and television ==
"Hoppípolla" was used in 2006 advertisements for the BBC's Planet Earth television series, giving the band exposure to a mainstream audience. A high demand for the single led to it being republished in May 2006, distributed by EMI. This re-release of the single brought critical acclaim for the band in the mainstream music media.

Sigur Rós made a re-recorded version of "Hoppípolla" in 2016 for the trailers of Planet Earth II. The band had declined offers to license their music commercially, were not playing "Hoppípolla" in concert at the time and were reluctant to look "backwards" when recording, but they were supportive of Sir David Attenborough and the series' mission to depict the fragile global environment. The track was again featured in trailers for the next series by the BBC Natural History Unit, Blue Planet II, in 2017.

The song has been used as background music in BBC shows, including dramas, documentaries and its coverage of the 2006 FA Cup Final. It appeared in the trailers for the films Children of Men, Earth and Slumdog Millionaire, the soundtrack of the 2006 film Penelope, the 2011 film We Bought a Zoo (Jónsi also acted as its composer), the 2021 film The Mitchells vs. the Machines, and has been used in advertisements for Thomson Reuters, Oxfam and Viasat. The song has also been used in the film of Italian capital Rome's bid for the 2024 Summer Olympics. While it does not appear on the film's soundtrack album, it is also featured in Eurovision Song Contest: The Story of Fire Saga.
