= Hrafntinna =

Song by Sigur Rós

from the album Kveikur
- Recorded: 2012–2013
- Studio: Sundlaugin Studio (Mosfellsbær, Iceland); Eldorado Recording Studios (Burbank, California); Pacifique Studios (Hollywood, California)
- Genre: Post-rock
- Length: 6:22
- Label: XL Recordings
- Songwriter(s): Jón Þór Birgisson, Orri Páll Dýrason, Georg Hólm
- Producer(s): Sigur Rós

"Hrafntinna" (Icelandic for "Obsidian", pronounced [ˈr̥apn.ˌtʰɪnːa]) is a song written and recorded by Icelandic post-rock band Sigur Rós for their seventh studio album Kveikur. It appears as the second track on the album. The song appeared on the Icelandic Tónlist chart in the week of the release of Kveikur, thanks to strong digital sales of the album, which debuted at #1 on the Tonlist album charts. The song peaked at #29.

== Live performances ==
"Hrafntinna" was one of four tracks played from Kveikur during the Sigur Rós World Tour to be played before the release of the album. It was first played at the Coliseu do Porto in Porto, Portugal on 13 February 2013, and has become a staple part of the setlist for the rest of the tour, usually appearing near the beginning or at the middle of a setlist. Like most tracks from Kveikur played live on the tour, "Hrafntinna" is played with a three-piece brass and five-piece string orchestra as featured on the album. Sigur Ros performed the song live in an episode of Empty Space for French website La Blogothèque in September 2013.

== Personnel ==
Adapted from Kveikur liner notes.

Sigur Rós

- Jón Þór Birgisson – vocals, guitar
- Georg Hólm – bass
- Orri Páll Dýrason – drums

Additional musicians

- Eiríkur Orri Ólafsson – brass arrangement
- Daníel Bjarnason – string arrangement
- Sigrún Jónsdóttir – brass
- Eiríkur Orri Ólafsson – brass
- Bergrún Snæbjörnsdóttir – brass
- Borgar Magnason – strings
- Margrét Árnadóttir – strings
- Pálína Árnadóttir – strings
- Una Sveinbjarnardóttir – strings
- Þórunn Ósk Marinósdóttir – strings

Additional personnel

- Ted Jensen – mastering
- Rich Costey – mixing
- Alex Somers – mixing, recording
- Elisabeth Carlsson – assistant mixing
- Eric Isip – assistant mixing
- Chris Kasych – assistant mixing
- Laura Sisk – assistant mixing
- Birgir Jón Birgisson – recording
- Valgeir Sigurdsson – recording (strings)

== Charts ==
Chart (2013)	Peak position
Iceland (Tónlist)	29
