= Takk... =

2005 album by Sigur Rós

Studio album by Sigur Rós
- Released: 12 September 2005
- Recorded: 2004–2005
- Studio: Sundlaugin
- Genre: Post-rock
- Length: 65:32
- Labels: Geffen (US); EMI
- Producers: Sigur Rós; Ken Thomas

Sigur Rós chronology
( ) (2002)	Takk... (2005)	Hvarf/Heim (2007)

Singles from Takk...
- 1. "Glósóli" Released: 15 August 2005; 2. "Sæglópur" Released: 16 August 2005; 3. "Hoppípolla" Released: 28 November 2005

Takk... ([ˈtʰaʰkː], Thanks...) is the fourth studio album by the Icelandic post-rock band Sigur Rós, released on 12 September 2005, and on the next day in the United States by Geffen Records. The album debuted at number 27 on the US Billboard 200, selling 30,000 copies in its first week.

== Music and lyrics ==
Unlike its predecessor ( ), the album's lyrics are mostly in Icelandic, with occasional elements of Vonlenska ("Hopelandic"), a scat-like form of gibberish. The songs "Andvari", "Gong" and "Mílanó" are sung entirely in Vonlenska. Moreover, the song "Mílanó" was written together with the string quartet Amiina.

Rhythmically, Takk... makes extensive use of changing time signatures. In the track "Andvari" for example, the main melody repeats itself every 27 beats, with stress on beats 1, 5, 9, 11, 16, 20 and 25. This could be rendered as seven bars of 4, 4, 2, 5, 4, 5 and 3 beats respectively. Against this there is a steady counter-rhythm of triple time, which could be rendered as eighteen bars of 3/8 time per 27-beat cycle, also known as a phrase.

== Release and promotion ==
"Glósóli" and "Sæglópur" were released on 15 and 16 August 2005 as the first and second singles respectively, the former worldwide and the latter only in the United States. "Hoppípolla" was released in the UK on 28 November 2005 as the third single. It peaked at number 24 on the UK Singles Chart in May 2006. All three singles were accompanied by a music video.

1,000 copies of Takk... on vinyl were manufactured and arrived in UK and US stores as of January 2006. It is composed of a gatefold sleeve housing two 12 inch records, with a single die cut page that houses a 10-inch record with a design by Olivia De Bartha etched on one side.

An extended Sæglópur EP was released, featuring three new songs. The EP also included a DVD with all three music videos.

== Critical reception ==
Professional ratings
Aggregate scores
Source	Rating
Metacritic	84/100
Review scores
Source	Rating
AllMusic	4/5 stars
Blender	4/5 stars
Entertainment Weekly	A−
The Guardian	4/5 stars
Los Angeles Times	2.5/4 stars
NME	8/10
Pitchfork	7.8/10
Q	4/5 stars
Rolling Stone	3.5/5 stars
Spin	A

Sigur Rós received three awards at the Icelandic Music Awards in 2006: Best Album Design (along with Ísak Winther, Alex Somers and Lukka Sigurðardóttir), Best Alternative Act and Best Rock Album for Takk.... In December 2005, American webzine Somewhere Cold ranked Takk... No. 4 on their 2005 Somewhere Cold Awards Hall of Fame list.

== Media usage ==
The BBC has frequently used tracks from Takk... in its programmes. "Hoppípolla" was used as the backing music to trailers for the highly acclaimed nature series Planet Earth and for the end credits of Match of the Day broadcasting the FA Cup Final. "Sæglópur" has been used as a backing tune for the BBC's advertising campaign for the 2006 Wimbledon Championships, while snips of "Sæglópur", "Milanó", "Gong", and "Svo hljótt" appeared in Top Gear. "Sæglópur" was also notably used in Ubisoft's Prince of Persia E3 2008 gameplay debut trailer as well as their televised commercials for the game. The FIA also used "Hoppípolla" at the end of their review for the Formula One Season, aired during the 2009 FIA Gala.

"Hoppípolla" has also been used in multiple films such as the end of We Bought a Zoo, the end of Eurovision Song Contest: The Story of Fire Saga, and during the closing credits of Penelope. Instrumental versions of "Hoppípolla" and "Inní mér syngur vitleysingur" (off the band's 2008 album Með suð í eyrum við spilum endalaust) were featured back-to-back during the closing scenes of The Mitchells vs. the Machines.

In 2009, British electronic music artist Chicane produced a progressive trance remix of "Hoppípolla", titled "Poppiholla", which was on rotation on BBC Radio 1's B list in June 2009.

== Track listing ==
Takk... track listing
No.	Title	English translation	Length
1.	"Takk..."	"Thanks"	1:57
2.	"Glósóli"	"Glowing sole"	6:15
3.	"Hoppípolla"	"Hopping into puddles"	4:28
4.	"Með blóðnasir"	"I have a nosebleed"	2:17
5.	"Sé lest"	"I see a train"	8:40
6.	"Sæglópur"	"Lost at sea"	7:38
7.	"Mílanó"	"Milan"	10:25
8.	"Gong"	"Gong"	5:33
9.	"Andvari"	"Zephyr"	6:40
10.	"Svo hljótt"	"So quietly"	7:24
11.	"Heysátan"	"The haystack"	4:09
Total length:			65:32

On vinyl, "Milanó" is featured on the single-sided 10" included with the set and is labelled as the final side, effectively moving "Milanó" to the end of the album, after "Heysátan" (indicated by the label which has the album's last tracks on side 2B but features "Milanó" on side 3A. Also on the inside of the sleeve. The track listing has "Milanó" on its original place).

== Personnel ==
Credits adapted from the band's official website.

Sigur Rós

- Sigur Rós – production, composition, cover design
- Jón Þór Birgisson – vocals, guitar
- Kjartan Sveinsson – keyboards
- Georg Hólm – bass guitar
- Orri Páll Dýrason – drums

Additional musicians

- Amiina – strings, string arrangement (track 7)
- Kristín Lárusdóttir – cello
- Júlía Mogensen – cello
- Stefanía Ólafsdóttir – violas
- Eyjólfur Bjarni Alfreðsson – violas
- Ingrid Karlsdóttir – violins
- Greta Salóme Stefánsdóttir – violins
- Matthías Stefánsson – violins
- Ólöf Júlía Kjartansdóttir – violins
- Eiríkur Orri Ólafsson – trumpets
- Snorri Sigurðarson – trumpets
- Helgi Hrafn Jónsson – trombones
- Samúel Jón Samúelsson – trombones
- Össur Geirsson – tuba
- Frank Aarnink – percussion
- Álafosskórinn – choir (track 3)

Additional personnel

- Kenneth Vaughan Thomas – engineering, mixing, co-production
- Birgir Jón Birgisson – additional engineering
- Ted Jensen – mastering
- Ísak Winther – cover design
- Alex Somers – cover design
- Lukka Sigurðardóttir – cover design

== Takk... (The Tape Variations) ==
Takk... (The Tape Variations)

Remix album by Sigur Rós
- Released: 13 November 2025
- Producers: Ken Thomas; Sidney Satorsky

Sigur Rós chronology
Átta (2023)	Takk... (The Tape Variations) (2025)

On 13 November 2025, a month after the release of the 20th anniversary reissue and remaster of Takk..., Sigur Rós released a rework album called Takk... (The Tape Variations), made in collaboration with Toronto-based producer Sidney Satorsky. Satorsky had worked with Jónsi previously on the second Jónsi & Alex album Lost & Found. Takk... (The Tape Variations) was initially released exclusively through the streaming service Medallion FM and saw a full release on 5 December 2025. Satorsky said of the collaboration:

Takk... has been one of my favourite albums since it was released 20 years ago. When I was invited to collaborate on this album I wanted to explore creating alternate versions of the songs that felt at home somewhere between sleep and awake.

No.	Title	Length
1.	"Takk... (The Tape Variations)"
2.	"Glósóli (The Tape Variations)"
3.	"Hoppípolla (The Tape Variations)"
4.	"Með blóðnasir (The Tape Variations)"
5.	"Sæglópur (The Tape Variations)"
6.	"Sé Lest Pt. 1 (The Tape Variations)"
7.	"Sé Lest Pt. 2 (The Tape Variations)"
8.	"Svo Hljótt (The Tape Variations)"
9.	"Gong (The Tape Variations)"
10.	"Mílanó (The Tape Variations)"
11.	"Heysátan (The Tape Variations)"
12.	"Andvari (The Tape Variations)"

== Charts ==
=== Weekly charts ===
2005 weekly chart performance for Takk...
Chart (2005)	Peak position
Australian Albums (ARIA)	19
Austrian Albums (Ö3 Austria)	35
Belgian Albums (Ultratop Flanders)	8
Belgian Albums (Ultratop Wallonia)	17
Danish Albums (Hitlisten)	16
Dutch Albums (Album Top 100)	44
Finnish Albums (Suomen virallinen lista)	8
French Albums (SNEP)	30
German Albums (Offizielle Top 100)	27
Irish Albums (IRMA)	6
Italian Albums (FIMI)	4
Norwegian Albums (VG-lista)	4
Portuguese Albums (AFP)	5
Spanish Albums (Promusicae)	58
Swedish Albums (Sverigetopplistan)	12
Swiss Albums (Schweizer Hitparade)	31
UK Albums (Official Charts)	16
US Billboard 200	27

2025 weekly chart performance for Takk...
Chart (2025)	Peak position
Hungarian Physical Albums (MAHASZ)	40

=== Year-end charts ===
2016 year-end chart performance for Takk...
Chart (2016)	Position
Icelandic Albums (Plötutíóindi)	93

== Certifications and sales ==
Certifications and sales for Takk...
Region	Certification	Certified units/sales
Belgium (BRMA)	Gold	25,000^{*}
Denmark (IFPI Danmark)	Platinum	20,000^{‡}
Iceland	Gold	10,000
United Kingdom (BPI)	Platinum	300,000^{*}
United States	—	202,000
Summaries
Worldwide	—	800,000
^{*} Sales figures based on certification alone.^{‡} Sales+streaming figures based on certification alone.
