= Fantômas (Amiina album) =

Studio album by Amiina
- Released: November 25, 2016
- Label: Mengi

Amiina chronology
The Lighthouse Project (2013)	Fantômas (2016)

Professional ratings
Review scores
Source	Rating
The Irish Times	4/5 stars
PrettyInNoise	8.5/10 stars

Fantômas is the third album by amiina. It was released in late 2016 and was originally conceived as a score to the silent movie of the same name. It premiered at a screening of the silent movies in Paris 2013 together with music by James Blackshaw, Tim Hecker, Loney, Dear and Yann Tiersen who also curated the event.

The special edition of the album came with a playable postcard with the song "Café From Fantômas" and four semitransparent prints of the band members.

== Track listing ==
1. "Fantômas" – 3:07
2. "Juve & Fandor" – 5:29
3. "Paris" – 2:50
4. "Café" – 3:25
5. "Simplon Express" – 3:36
6. "Telegram" – 3:04
7. "Entrepôts de Bercy" – 3:09
8. "Crocodile" – 5:39
9. "Lady Beltham" – 4:38
10. "Bourreau Silencieux" – 4:34
11. "l’Homme Noir" – 6:52

Track listing of special edition playable postcard

1. "Café From Fantômas" – 2:45

== Personnel ==
All music by Amiina:

- Guðmundur Vignir Karlsson
- Magnús Trygvason Eliassen
- Maria Huld Markan Sigfúsdóttir
- Sólrún Sumarliðadóttir

Additional performers:

- Edda Rún Ólafsdóttir on "Fantômas"
- Hildur Ársælsdóttir on "Fantômas"
- Recorded by Birgir Jón Birgisson, Marry Wilson, Gunnar Tynes and Amiina
- Mixed by Ívar Ragnarsson, Sigurður Geirdal, Gunnar Tynes and Amiina
- Mastered by HafÞor Karlsson
