= Odin's Raven Magic =

2020 Icelandic soundtrack album

Soundtrack album by Sigur Rós, Steindór Andersen, Hilmar Örn Hilmarsson and María Huld Markan Sigfúsdóttir
- Released: 4 December 2020
- Recorded: 2004
- Genre: Classical; post-rock
- Length: 65:31
- Language: Icelandic
- Label: Krúnk

Sigur Rós chronology
Kveikur (2013)	Odin's Raven Magic (2020)	Átta (2023)

Singles from Odin's Raven Magic
- 1. "Dvergmál" Released: 23 October 2020; 2. "Stendur æva" Released: 13 November 2020; 3. "Spár eða spakmál" Released: 4 December 2020

Odin's Raven Magic is a 2002 orchestral setting to the Icelandic poem Hrafnagaldr Óðins. The composition was a collaboration by Sigur Rós, Hilmar Örn Hilmarsson, Steindór Andersen, Páll Guðmundsson and Maria Huld Markan Sigfúsdóttir. It was premiered at the Barbican Centre in London on 21 April 2002 and then performed at the Reykjavík Arts Festival on 24 May 2002. Video of the production can be viewed in the documentary Screaming Masterpiece or Gargandi snilld, by Ari Alexander Ergis Magnússon.

In October 2020, the band announced that a recording of Odin's Raven Magic would be released on December 4, 2020.

== Track listing ==
Adapted from MusicBrainz.

All tracks are written by Jón Þór Birgisson, Georg Hólm, Orri Páll Dýrason, Kjartan Sveinsson, Steindór Andersen, Hilmar Örn Hilmarsson and María Huld Markan Sigfúsdóttir.

No.	Title	Length
1.	"Prologus" ("Prologue")	5:54
2.	"Alföður orkar" ("Allfather Works")	7:48
3.	"Dvergmál" (the language of the dwarves, lit. "Dwarf Talk")	7:37
4.	"Stendur æva" ("Stands forever")	9:47
5.	"Áss hinn hvíti" ("The White god")	5:10
6.	"Hvert stefnir" ("Where is (it) Heading?")	9:57
7.	"Spár eða spakmál" ("Prophecies or Wisdom")	7:42
8.	"Dagrenning" ("Dawn")	11:35
Total length:		65:31

== Charts ==
Chart performance for Odin's Raven Magic
Chart (2020)	Peak position
Belgian Albums (Ultratop Flanders)	62
Belgian Albums (Ultratop Wallonia)	174
