= Puzzle (disambiguation) =

A puzzle is a type of mental challenge.

Puzzle often refers to:

- Crossword puzzle, a word game
- Economic puzzle, where the implication of theory is inconsistent with observed economic data
- Jigsaw puzzle, a type of puzzle
- Puzzle video game, a video game genre

== Film ==
- Puzzle (1974 film), an Italian film
- Puzzle (1978 film), an Australian television film
- Puzzle (2006 film), a Korean film
- Puzzle (2010 film), an Argentine film
- Puzzle (2014 film), a Japanese film
- Puzzle (2018 film), an American film

== Games ==
- 15 puzzle, a mathematical sliding puzzle game with many variations, sometimes titled Puzzle
  - Puzzle (Mac OS), a 1984 Desk Accessory for Classic Mac OS
  - Puzzle, a 1985 version of 15 puzzle included with pre-release versions of Windows 1.0
- Puzzle (1990 video game), by American Video Entertainment

== Music ==
=== Artists ===
- Puzzle (artist), electropop artist based in London, UK
- The Puzzle (band), Hungarian indie rock band
- Puzzle, a solo project by Fletcher Shears

=== Albums ===
- Puzzle (Amiina album), 2010 album by Amiina
- Puzzle (Biffy Clyro album), the 2007 fourth album by Scottish group Biffy Clyro
- Puzzle (Dada album), the 1992 debut album by the rock band dada
- Puzzle (Gianna Nannini album), the 1986 album by Gianna Nannini
- Puzzle (Kanjani Eight album), by the Japanese boy band Kanjani Eight
- Puzzle (Mandrake Memorial album), 1969 album by the American psychedelic group Mandrake Memorial
- The Puzzle (album), a 2016 album by Dark Sarah
- The Puzzle, a 2021 album by Devin Townsend, released as The Puzzle / Snuggles
- Puzzle, 1999 album by the pop band Tahiti 80

=== Songs ===
- "Puzzle" (CNBLUE song), a 2016 song by CNBLUE
- "Puzzle" (Mai Kuraki song), a 2009 song by Mai Kuraki
- "Puzzle", a 2014 song by Fernando Milagros
- "Puzzle", a 2017 song by Band-Maid from Just Bring It
- "Puzzle", a 2017 song by Loona from Choerry

== Other uses ==
- Puzzle (Narnia), a character in C. S. Lewis' Chronicles of Narnia

== See also ==
- Thomas Samuel Kuhn's concept of normal science regards science as a process of "puzzle-solving"
