= Ísjaki =

Single by Sigur Rós

from the album Kveikur
- Released: April 29, 2013
- Recorded: 2012
- Studio: Sundlaugin Studio (Mosfellsbær, Iceland)
- Genre: Dream pop; post-rock
- Length: 5:03
- Label: XL Recordings
- Songwriters: Jón Þór Birgisson; Georg Hólm; Orri Páll Dýrason
- Producers: Jón Þór Birgisson; Orri Páll Dýrason; Georg Hólm

Sigur Rós singles chronology
"Brennisteinn" (2013)	"Ísjaki" (2013)	"Rafstraumur (Cyril Hahn Remix)" (2013)

Music video
- "Ísjaki" on YouTube

"Ísjaki" (Icelandic for "Iceberg", pronounced [ˈiːsjacɪ]) is a song written and recorded by Icelandic post-rock band Sigur Rós for their seventh studio album Kveikur. It appears as the third track on the album. "Ísjaki" was released to Icelandic contemporary hit radio as a promotional single from Kveikur on April 24, 2013. It was later released early on the Kveikur album listing on iTunes on April 25, 2013.

A lyric video for the song was also released on April 24, 2013.

== Track listing ==
Digital download
No.	Title	Length
1.	"Ísjaki"	5:03

Icelandic promotional single
No.	Title	Length
1.	"Ísjaki" (Radio edit)	3:46

== Personnel ==
Adapted from the Kveikur liner notes.

Sigur Rós

- Jón Þór Birgisson – vocals, guitar
- Georg Hólm – bass
- Orri Páll Dýrason – drums

Additional musicians

- Eiríkur Orri Ólafsson – brass arrangement
- Daníel Bjarnason – string arrangement
- Sigrún Jónsdóttir – brass
- Eiríkur Orri Ólafsson – brass
- Bergrún Snæbjörnsdóttir – brass
- Borgar Magnason – strings
- Margrét Árnadóttir – strings
- Pálína Árnadóttir – strings
- Una Sveinbjarnardóttir – strings
- Þórunn Ósk Marinósdóttir – strings

Additional personnel

- Ted Jensen – mastering
- Rich Costey – mixing
- Alex Somers – mixing, recording
- Elisabeth Carlsson – assistant mixing
- Eric Isip – assistant mixing
- Chris Kasych – assistant mixing
- Laura Sisk – assistant mixing
- Birgir Jón Birgisson – recording
- Valgeir Sigurdsson – recording (strings)

== Charts ==
Chart (2013)	Peak position
Iceland (Tónlist)	12

== Release history ==
Region	Date	Format	Label
Iceland	April 24, 2013	CD-R (Contemporary hit radio)	XL Recordings
United Kingdom	April 29, 2013	Digital download	XL Recordings
United States	April 29, 2013	Digital download	XL Recordings
United Kingdom	June 17, 2013	CD-R (Contemporary hit radio)	XL Recordings
