= Kurr =

Studio album by Amiina
- Released: March 21, 2007
- Length: 50:27
- Label: Bláskjár

Amiina chronology
Animamina (2004)	Kurr (2007)	Re Minore (2009)

Singles from Kurr
- 1. "Seoul" Released: January 6, 2006; 2. "Hilli (At the Top of the World)" Released: December 17, 2007

Professional ratings
Review scores
Source	Rating
21st Century Music	(8.1/10)
Pitchfork Media	(5.8/10)
Prefix	7.5/10 stars
Rockfeedback	2/5 stars
This Is Fake DIY	2.5/5 stars

Kurr (Icelandic for "Coo") is the debut album by the Icelandic quartet amiina. It was released on March 21, 2007, by their own label, Bláskjár Records, after being preceded by the single "Seoul" in late 2006. The album was partly recorded in Sigur Rós' Sundlaugin studio. Initial distribution of Kurr was handled through the official Amiina website.

== Track listing ==
All tracks written and performed by Amiina.

No.	Title	Length
1.	"Sogg"	2:50
2.	"Rugla"	3:59
3.	"Glámur"	5:50
4.	"Seoul"	6:56
5.	"Lúpína"	1:16
6.	"Hilli"	3:08
7.	"Sexfaldur"	4:47
8.	"Kolapot"	4:39
9.	"Saga"	0:41
10.	"Lóri"	4:14
11.	"Bláfeldur"	2:57
12.	"Boga"	9:10

== Personnel ==
- Orri Páll Dýrason – drums
- Freyja Gunnlaugsdóttir – bass clarinet on "Lóri"
- Eiríkur Orri Ólafsson, Snorri Sigurðarson – trumpet on "Bláfeldur"
- Helgi Hrafn Jónsson, Ingi Garðar Erlandsson, Samúel J. Samúelsson – trombone on "Bláfeldur"
