= Valtari =

Studio album by Sigur Rós
- Released: 23 May 2012
- Recorded: 2009–2012
- Studio: Sundlaugin, Greenhouse Studios, Air Studios
- Genre: Post-rock; ambient; dream pop
- Length: 54:36
- Label: Parlophone
- Producer: Sigur Rós; Alex Somers

Sigur Rós chronology
Með suð í eyrum við spilum endalaust (2008)	Valtari (2012)	Kveikur (2013)

Singles from Valtari
- 1. "Ekki múkk" Released: 26 March 2012; 2. "Varúð" Released: 21 August 2012

Valtari (Icelandic pronunciation: [ˈval̥tarɪ], lit. 'Steamroller') is the sixth studio album by Icelandic post-rock band Sigur Rós. It was released on 23 May 2012 by Parlophone. The album reached number eight on the UK Albums Chart and seven on the Billboard 200. The album was met with positive reviews as well with Metacritic, which assigns a normalised rating out of 100 to reviews from mainstream critics, the album received an average score of 74, based on 36 reviews, indicating "generally favorable reviews".

Two singles were released from the album, the first being for "Ekki múkk" released on 10-inch vinyl for Record Store Day, and the second being for "Varúð", as a limited edition 10-inch vinyl to coincide with their 2012 summer tour. Valtari's album cover is by Jónsi's sisters, Lilja and Inga Birgisdóttir. Inga was also the baby on the cover art for Sigur Rós' debut album Von.

== Background ==
In the fall of 2008, after the release of their fifth studio album Með suð í eyrum við spilum endalaust, the band embarked on a world tour supporting their newly released album. The band played as a four-piece without Amiina and the brass band, the first time the band had played as a four-piece in seven years. The tour started on 17 September 2008 in the United States, at the United Palace Theater in New York City, and finished with a concert in Reykjavík at Laugardalshöll on 23 November 2008. The majority of the tour was European with the exception of concerts in the United States, Australia, Canada and Japan. The band then went on a break, with their manager saying they were on an indefinite hiatus, although Jónsi commented, "We'd been touring for so many years and we'd gotten tired so we took a break and the guys had babies." Jónsi released an album titled Riceboy Sleeps in 2009 with his partner Alex Somers, and then released a solo album titled Go the next year.

In August 2011, they announced the release of their new live double album Inni to be released on 7 November 2011. The recording is of the last show before they announced their "indefinite hiatus" at the end of 2008. It was recorded over two nights at London's Alexandra Palace. It was to be released as a DVD, on CD and vinyl. The film debuted at the Venice Film Festival on 3 September 2011. The album was then released on 7 November to critical acclaim. Commercially, it reached number 45 on the UK Albums Chart and number 7 on the Billboard 200.

== Recording ==
Despite being on a break, the band began recording for the album in March 2009 with Alex Somers, with some of the songs dating from 2007. "Dauðalogn" and "Varðeldur" started being recorded during these sessions, except they began to "slow everything down". The band began to use a lot of their old music and add other parts to it, but said it was "not inspiring", so they scrapped it and began again. However, "Fjögur píanó" was made from a loop of some old material, which they kept. On 28 May 2009, Sigur Rós announced that they had almost completed recording their latest album. The unnamed album was expected to be released sometime in 2010. However, the band later revealed that the recordings had been scrapped. In a 2010 interview, Jónsi confirmed "We haven't got another album ready", he said. "It was just a rumour. We started to record something, but then we chucked it all away. So I think we are going to have to start it all again". Without further word on the new album, Sigur Rós were rumoured to be on indefinite hiatus as of January 2010. However, before taking the stage at Coachella in April 2010, Jónsi commented that Sigur Rós would be getting back to work that year: "I'm gonna record some other stuff with Sigur Rós when I'm home", between a series of shows during his solo tour in summer 2010. On 1 February 2011, Jónsi's official website announced that he would be back in the studio with the band over the spring.

Hólm also said of the album:

I really can't remember why we started this record, I no longer know what we were trying to do back then. I do know session after session went pear-shaped, we lost focus and almost gave up... did give up for a while. But then something happened and form started to emerge, and now I can honestly say that it's the only Sigur Rós record I have listened to for pleasure in my own house after we've finished it.

== Composition ==
Bassist Georg Hólm described the album as having "more electronic stuff than before" but not being "a dance album", and the band described the album as "an avalanche in slow motion." The album opening track "Ég anda" has been described to have "reverb-heavy guitars chiming quietly before Jónsi's distinctive falsetto floats in over what sounds like an army of music boxes". "Dauðalogn" and "Varðeldur" were written as far back as 2009, with "Varðeldur" being a different version of the song "Lúppulagið" from Inni. The second track "Ekki múkk" was referred to as "an unhurried assembly of vinyl crackle and fragile guitar." The title of the album means "Roller" in English, which Jónsi said they chose because they "just liked that word", saying that "it kind of fits with the album because it's big and slow and rolls over you slowly." He said that it was the working title of one song, but was then changed as the title for a different song which now is the seventh track on the album. The track "Valtari" has been described as "a layered, gorgeous nothing, lush with nuanced drift and harmonic sweetness." "Fjögur píanó" (Four Pianos) was made up of looped parts of old and previously unused material.

== Release ==
On 26 March 2012, the band announced the details of their sixth studio album, along with the premier of their new track "Ekki múkk". In April, they released "Ekki múkk" as a single for Record Store Day 2012, releasing it on limited edition 10" vinyl that plays inside out. Its B-side is an instrumental track titled "Kvistur". This B-side is also available as a pre-order bonus track. It was released along with a double vinyl release of Hvarf/Heim. The song "Dauðalogn" was premiered during the third season finale of The Vampire Diaries, aired 10 May 2012. On 17 May, the official website streamed the album online, in an activity called Valtari Hour at 7 p.m. at time zones around the world, in advance of the album's release. On the same day, Zane Lowe premiered another brand new track from the album, "Ég anda", on BBC Radio 1.

On 28 May, Valtari was released through Parlophone on CD, vinyl and as a digital download. The album debuted at number eight on the UK Albums Chart, selling 11,136 copies in its first week. In the United States, the album entered the Billboard 200 at number seven with first-week sales of 26,000 copies, the band's first top ten entry and third best sales week. By March 2013, the album had sold 74,000 copies in US. On 21 August, the song "Varúð" was released as single in a special limited edition 10-inch vinyl to coincide with their 2012 summer tour. It plays inside out, just like "Ekki múkk". Its B-side, "Logn", is also a pre-order bonus track.

== The Valtari Mystery Film Experiment ==
The Valtari Mystery Film Experiment was that Sigur Rós had given a dozen film makers the same budget and asked them to create whatever comes into their head when they listen to songs from the band's forthcoming album. The idea is to abandon the usual approval process from Sigur Rós, and allow film makers utmost creative freedom. Among the twelve filmmakers working without brief to a chosen song are Ramin Bahrani, Alma Har'el, John Cameron Mitchell and Ryan McGinley. The videos were premiered from 21 May to 6 December 2012. The twelfth film, chosen by the band was the overall winner of the Valtari Film Competition, released on 15 October, called "Skinned" and features "Fjögur Píanó". It was directed by Anafelle Liu, Dio Lau and Ken Ngan.

Sigur Rós said:

"We never meant our music to come with a pre-programmed emotional response. We don't want to tell anyone how to feel and what to take from it. With the films, we have literally no idea what the directors are going to come back with. None of them know what the others are doing, so hopefully it could be interesting"

== Critical reception ==
Professional ratings
Aggregate scores
Source	Rating
AnyDecentMusic?	7.3/10
Metacritic	74/100
Review scores
Source	Rating
AllMusic	4/5 stars
The A.V. Club	A−
BBC Music	Positive
Drowned in Sound	8/10
NME	7/10
The Observer	3/5 stars
Pitchfork	6.1/10
PopMatters	7/10
Rolling Stone	3.5/5 stars
Slant Magazine	4/5 stars

Valtari received generally positive reviews from music critics. At Metacritic, which assigns a rating out of 100 to reviews from mainstream publications, the album received an average score of 74, based on 36 reviews. AllMusic writer Tim Sendra said the album was "filled with giant washes of sound bathed in reverb, echoing keyboards, smears of strings, and massed backing vocals, the album ebbs and flows from giant crescendos to heartbreakingly intimate moments with Jonsi's otherworldly voice riding the waves like a mythical dolphin", ending the review saying, "On the surface, Valtari may seem like a step back for the band, but instead of just retreading the past, the album is one of their best; a refined display of their musical power with breathtaking dynamics and enough emotion to flood an ocean." The A.V. Club said that "the relative restraint on the single 'Ekki Múkk' and other more straightforward songs like 'Varúð' and 'Rembihnútur' is a welcome shift for the group, ditching the bigger-is-better grandiloquence and predictable arcs of Sigur Rós' recent work." BBC Music writer Wyndham Wallace said that "much of the album sounds like it's made up of what would, in previous years, have only qualified as the introductions to songs. Opening track "Ég anda" takes an age to get underway, reverb-heavy guitars chiming quietly before Jónsi's distinctive falsetto floats in over what sounds like an army of music boxes, and, though Rembihnútur lifts off towards its end in a familiar fashion, drums are largely limited to distorted electronic pulses and there are none of the earth-scorching effects that have previously characterised similar moments," and that "for those more patient, however, the album represents calm after a storm, and highlights how Sigur Rós remain as eager to challenge themselves as their audience."

Drowned in Sound stated that "this is not an album of easy melodies, of playful riffs and crowd-pleasing moments. Indeed, it seems not for the crowd at all: as background music this fades away, shrinking into a still corner away from the noise." They later said that "Valtari seems rather brave: across a runtime of nearly an hour there's little effort to hold our attention, to vary the tone or venture anywhere, anywhere near mainstream appeal. And sure, huge swathes of this may run the risk of passing by unnoticed, of blurring into a single reverbed note, but that's our responsibility, and quite frankly our loss", ending the review saying "Valtari might not be a huge digression for the band but that doesn't matter: this is quietly, entrancingly and thoroughly sublime." NME, however, wrote that "this record will maintain their fan base, but it won't attract a new one". Pitchfork was not so positive either, stating, "The problem isn't that Valtari aspires to beauty, even if it's a commonplace, celestial understanding of it. Sigur Rós have proven they can make indelible music that's pretty and unpredictable, pretty and melodic, pretty and unnerving, pretty and inspiring. Valtari wants to be pretty and that's it." Rolling Stone said that "Jónsi's exquisite vocals evoke prayers or lullabies, while pecked-out piano melodies play amid dulcimer tones, sonar burps, elf choirs."

== Track listing ==
All tracks are written by Sigur Rós.

No.	Title	English translation^{[a]}	Length
1.	"Ég anda"	"I Breathe"	6:15
2.	"Ekki múkk"	"Not a Sound"	7:45
3.	"Varúð"	"Caution"	6:37
4.	"Rembihnútur"	"Tight Knot"	5:05
5.	"Dauðalogn"	"Dead Calm"	6:37
6.	"Varðeldur"	"Campfire"	6:08
7.	"Valtari"	"Steamroller"	8:19
8.	"Fjögur píanó"	"Four Pianos"	7:50
Total length:			54:36

Pre-order bonus tracks
No.	Title	English translation^{[a]}	Length
9.	"Logn"	"Calm"	8:14
10.	"Kvistur"	"Twig"	5:30
Total length:			68:20

- ^{^a} English translations not official.

== Personnel ==
Sigur Rós

- Jón Þór "Jónsi" Birgisson
- Georg "Goggi" Hólm
- Kjartan "Kjarri" Sveinsson
- Orri Páll Dýrason

Additional musicians

- Amiina (Hildur Ársælsdóttir, Edda Rún Ólafsdóttir, Maria Huld Markan Sigfúsdóttir, Sólrún Sumarliðadóttir) – strings and string arrangements (except for "Varúð")
- Una Sveinbjarnardóttir, Palina Arnadóttir, Borunn Ósk Marinosdóttir, Margret Arnadóttir, Boigar Magnason – strings on "Varúð"
- Holmfridur Benediktsdóttir, Hildur F. Havarjurdóttir, Bjorg Gardursdóttir, Salka B. Svanhvitardóttir, Brynhildur Melot, Hera Eriksdóttir – backing vocals on "Varúð"
- Daníel Bjarnason – string arrangements on "Varúð"
- The Sixteen – choir on "Dauðalogn" and "Varðeldur"
- Eamonn Dougan – choral direction on "Dauðalogn" and "Varðeldur"

== Charts ==
=== Weekly charts ===
Weekly chart performance for Valtari
Chart (2012)	Peak position
Australian Albums (ARIA)	14
Austrian Albums (Ö3 Austria)	39
Belgian Albums (Ultratop Flanders)	4
Belgian Albums (Ultratop Wallonia)	17
Canadian Albums (Billboard)	4
Czech Albums (ČNS IFPI)	18
Danish Albums (Hitlisten)	21
Dutch Albums (Album Top 100)	18
Finnish Albums (Suomen virallinen lista)	21
French Albums (SNEP)	29
German Albums (Offizielle Top 100)	23
Irish Albums (IRMA)	1
Italian Albums (FIMI)	7
Japanese Albums (Oricon)	17
Mexican Albums (Top 100 Mexico)	93
New Zealand Albums (RMNZ)	34
Norwegian Albums (VG-lista)	12
Polish Albums (ZPAV)	35
Portuguese Albums (AFP)	12
Scottish Albums (OCC)	6
Spanish Albums (PROMUSICAE)	21
Swedish Albums (Sverigetopplistan)	31
Swiss Albums (Schweizer Hitparade)	15
UK Albums (OCC)	8
US Billboard 200	7
US Independent Albums (Billboard)	2
US Top Alternative Albums (Billboard)	3
US Top Rock Albums (Billboard)	4

=== Year-end charts ===
2012 year-end chart performance for Valtari
Chart (2012)	Position
Belgian Albums (Ultratop Flanders)	75
Icelandic Albums (Tónlist)	11

== Release history ==
Release dates for Valtari
Region	Date	Label	Ref.
Japan	23 May 2012	EMI	
Australia	25 May 2012	EMI	
Germany	25 May 2012	EMI	
United Kingdom	28 May 2012	Parlophone	
United States	29 May 2012	XL	
Taiwan	8 June 2012	Gold Typhoon	
