= Animamina =

AnimaminA

EP by Amiina
- Released: December 2004
- Recorded: 2004
- Genre: Post-rock
- Length: 18:31
- Label: Smekkleysa

Amiina chronology
AnimaminA (2004)	Kurr (2007)

Professional ratings
Review scores
Source	Rating
Allmusic	4/5 stars
Pitchfork Media	7.0/10 stars

AnimaminA is the debut EP by Icelandic string quartet amiina. The EP was first published in early December 2004 by Smekkleysa in Iceland, and then in mid-2005 by The Workers Institute in the United States and Speak N Spell in Australia. Its title was a palindrome based on the band's name, which at the time of the EP's publication was amína. (It has now been changed to amiina to avoid disputes with another group of the same name.) The EP is composed of four tracks and is predominantly strings, electronic samples, and experimental instrumentation, such as the use of drinking glasses to generate sound or the playing of a saw with a bow. The album's sound is reminiscent of fellow Icelandic artists Sigur Rós and Múm though their style remains largely disparate from either, and have collaborated with the former.

== Track listing ==
1. "Skakka" – 4:13
2. "Hemipode" – 4:29
3. "Fjarskanistan" – 6:29
4. "Bláskjár" – 3:20
