= Call bell =

Bell used to call for an attendant

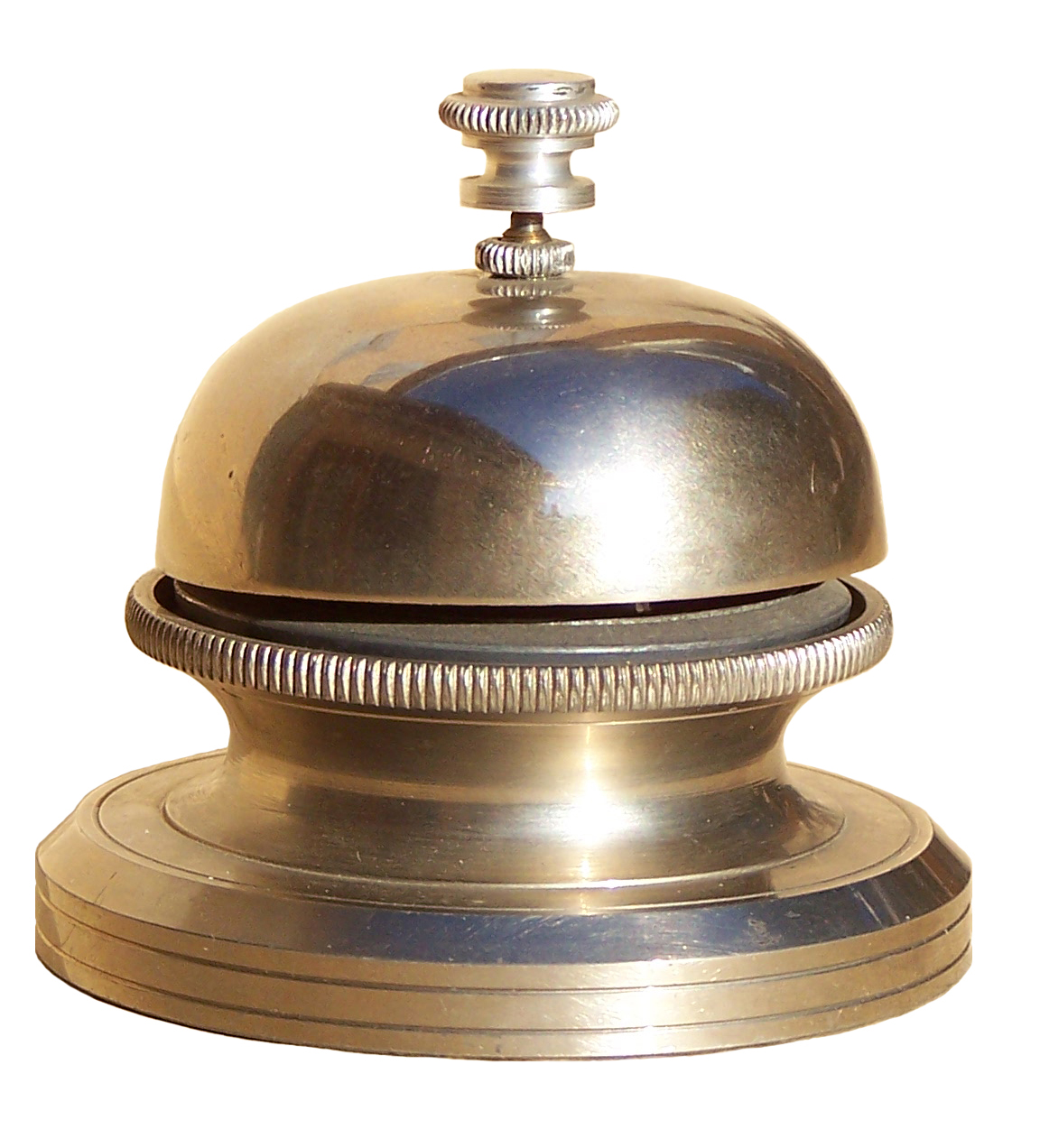
A call bell placed on a countertop.

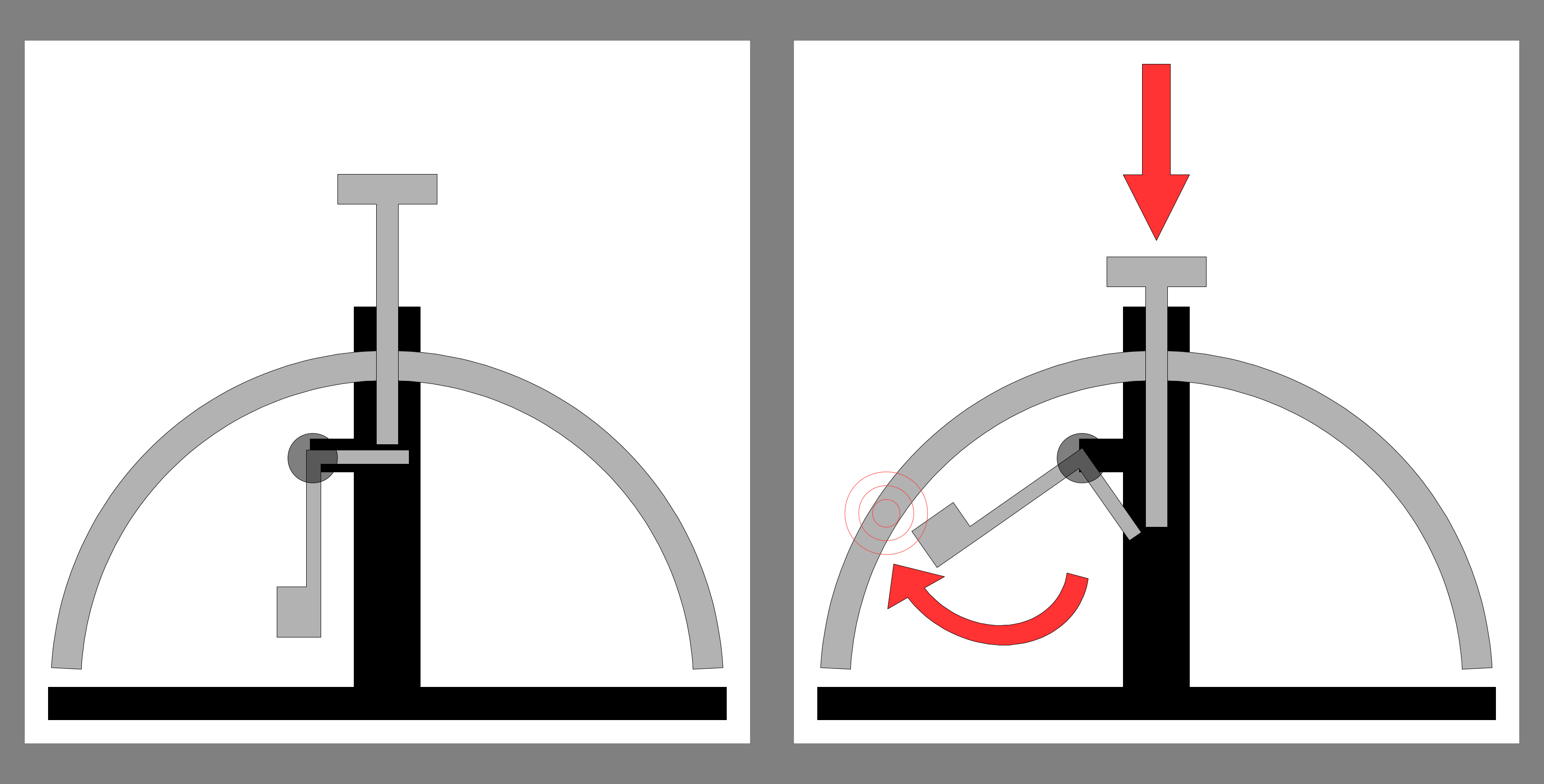
Principle of operation of a countertop call bell

A call bell is a bell used to summon an attendant or give an alarm or notice. The bell alerts and calls the attention of the attendant who hears it. They are sometimes called service bell, reception bell, or concierge bell.

A call bell can be placed on the countertop in hotels or other such facilities where people need to call attention to the person in charge to check them in, take their bags, or for any other reasons.
