= Amiina =

Icelandic band

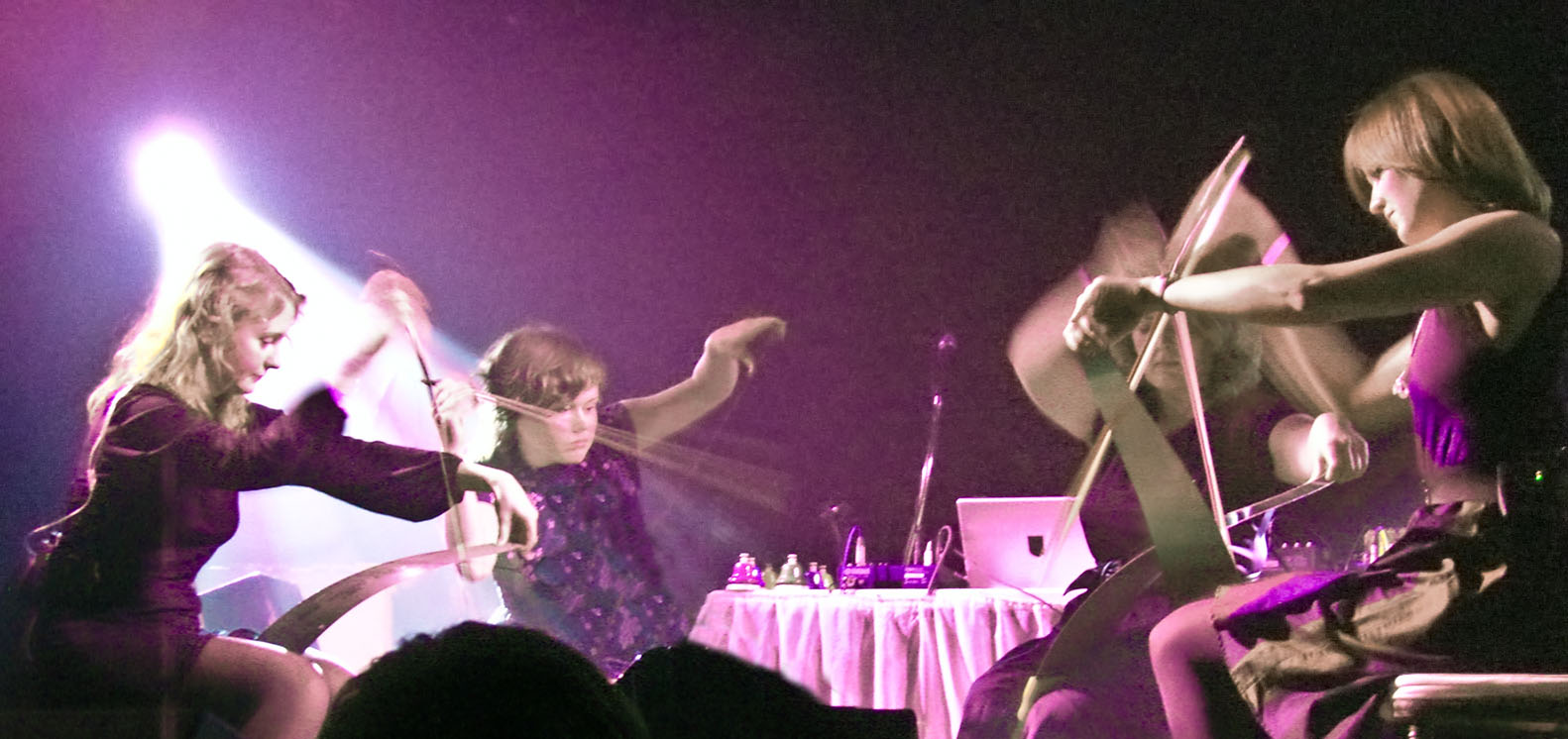
- amiina in Minneapolis, 2007. Left to right: Maria, Hildur, Edda, Sólrún.

Background information
- Also known as: Amína
- Origin: Reykjavík, Iceland
- Genres: Indie pop; Minimalism; neoclassical; folk; ambient; post-rock
- Years active: 2004–present
- Labels: Bláskjár; Ever; Kitchen Motors; Rumraket; Speak'n'spell; The Worker's Institute; Shake
- Members: Maria Huld Markan Sigfúsdóttir; Sólrún Sumarliðadóttir; Magnús Trygvason Eliassen; Guðmundur Vignir Karlsson
- Past members: Hildur Ársælsdóttir; Edda Rún Ólafsdóttir
- Website: amiina.com

Amiina (formerly Amína, stylized in lowercase) is an Icelandic band composed of members Maria Huld Markan Sigfúsdóttir, and Sólrún Sumarliðadóttir, Magnús Trygvason Eliassen and Guðmundur Vignir Karlsson. In the past they have frequently performed live and in the studio with Sigur Rós.

Their music is made with a great number of instruments. It contains elements of minimalistic style, contemporary classical, ambient, and electronic loops. In their performances each member will play many instruments, sometimes moving across the stage, going from one instrument to another mid-song.

== History ==
The founding members Maria Huld Markan Sigfúsdóttir (born 29 September 1980), Sólrún Sumarliðadóttir (born 10 August 1977), Hildur Ársælsdóttir (born 31 January 1980) and Edda Rún Ólafsdóttir (born 3 February 1978) performed as a quartet playing classical music when they were studying string instruments at the Reykjavík College of Music in the late 1990s. María and Hildur as violinists, Edda as violist, and Sólrún as cellist. Later on they adopted the name amiina and increasingly moved on to play all sorts of music with various bands in Reykjavík.

In 1999 the quartet joined Icelandic band Sigur Rós on-stage. The collaboration has continued ever since, with amiina contributing strings to Sigur Rós' music on tour and in the recording studio notably on the award-winning album ( ) as well as its follow-up, Takk...., and Með suð í eyrum við spilum endalaust. amiina recorded strings for the Sigur Rós album Valtari but no longer accompany Sigur Rós on tour.

Their first commercially available recording was the four-track EP animamina. This was followed by their first single, Seoul. Their first full-length album, Kurr, was released 21 March 2007, through the band's own label, Bláskjár. It was re-released by Ever Records in June 2007.

amiina's first solo tours of Europe and America were in October and November 2006. Following the release of Kurr in 2007 they toured North America in March and April and Europe in May. The song "Hilli" was released on 10 December 2007, as the second single from the album Kurr. It is a collaboration between amiina and Lee Hazlewood whose vocals (the last recording before his death) were mixed with a reworked version of the original song.

amiina appeared in the 2008 Icelandic movie Brúðguminn (White Night Wedding).

In the autumn of 2007, drummer Magnús Trygvason Eliassen (born 18 November 1985) joined amiina on tour, adding percussion to the band's textures. A few months later, collaboration between amiina and the electronic artist Guðmundur Vignir Karlsson (born 10 November 1978) under the moniker Kippi Kaninus was initiated while preparing a show for the Reykjavík Arts Festival. The merging of Kippi Kaninus' electronics and rhythms with amiina's sounds and Magnús' percussion became the starting point for more established collaboration between the six musicians. During 2009 Magnús and Guðmundur joined the group on a permanent basis.

The recording of amiina's second studio album Puzzle started during spring or summer of 2010, released by the band on 27 September 2010, getting worldwide distribution the following year. The songs on Puzzle are more rhythmically rugged than previous work and feature heavier use of electronics. amiina's long-standing fondness for light melodies and open-minded instrumentation, however, continued.

In 2009 amiina started to perform their original soundtracks to pioneering German filmmaker Lotte Reiniger's 1930s silhouette animations of the timeless fairy tales Sleeping Beauty, Cinderella and Aladdin. The so-called Animagica program, originally performed at the Branchage Film Festival in Jersey, has now been performed at Latitude, Sydney Festival, Mona Foma in Tasmania, St. Leonard's Church London, Perth International Art Festival, National Museum of Singapore and Reykjavik's Children Festival. When performing the Animagica program amiina plays usually as a trio or a quartet.

In late 2012 amiina recorded The Lighthouse Project. It was a work which the band started in 2009 and was released as an EP in June 2013, distributed by Morr Music. These songs were recorded in their original arrangements for a quartet. Because the group felt it important to convey the intimacy of the original performances it was recorded "live" in the studio by Ben Frost.

In between work with amiina the band members have kept themselves busy, recording or touring with other artists such as: Sigur Rós, Yann Tiersen, Spiritualized, Efterklang, Yukihiro Takahasi, Canon Blue, Pétur Ben, Ben Frost, Tilbury, Borko, múm, Jónsi & Alex, Kippi Kaninus, ADHD, Sólstafir, Moses Hightower, Sin Fang, and Zoon van snooK.

During 2015 Hildur Ársælsdóttir and Edda Rún Ólafsdóttir left the band. On 25 November 2016, amiina returned as a four-member band releasing their album Fantômas. Their upcoming album Pharology is planned for 25 June 2021 and is expected as a digital and vinyl release. On 9 December 2022, amiina released Yule, an album consisting of instrumental interpretations of Christmas songs. The artwork of the album shows the original line up of the band, including Hildur and Edda.

== Instruments ==
Electronic
- Compact synthesizer
- Digital piano
- Theremin
Guitars
- Baroque
- Solid-body electric
Harps
- Celtic
Reeds
- Harmonium
- Melodica
Metallophones
- Celesta
- Glockenspiel (which they sometimes bow)
Viols
- Cello
- Viola
- Violin
Zithers
- Gideon harp (external description; also called a "table harp")
Other
- Call bells (also called "office" or "reception" bells)
- Glass harp
- Kalimba
- Mandolin
- Musical saw

== Discography ==
=== Albums ===
- Kurr (21 March 2007)
- Puzzle (September 2010)
- Fantômas (25 November 2016)
- Yule (9 December 2022)

=== EPs ===
- AnimaminA (9 May 2005)
- Re Minore (2009)
- The Lighthouse Project (7 June 2013)

=== Singles ===
- "Seoul" (6 November 2006)
- "Hilli (At The Top Of The World)" (17 December 2007) [7" limited edition]
- "Over & Again" (2010) [Limited to 500 copies]
- "What are we waiting for?" (September 2010)
- "Attic Series 1" (2020)
- "Beacon" (2021)
- "Pharology" (2021)

=== Compilation inclusions ===
- Screaming Masterpiece (2005)
- Kitchen Motors Family Album/Fjölskyldualbúm Tilraunaeldhússins (Spring 2006)
- Nightmare Revisited ("Doctor Finkelstein/In the Forest") (2008)
