= For a Minor Reflection =

Icelandic post-rock band

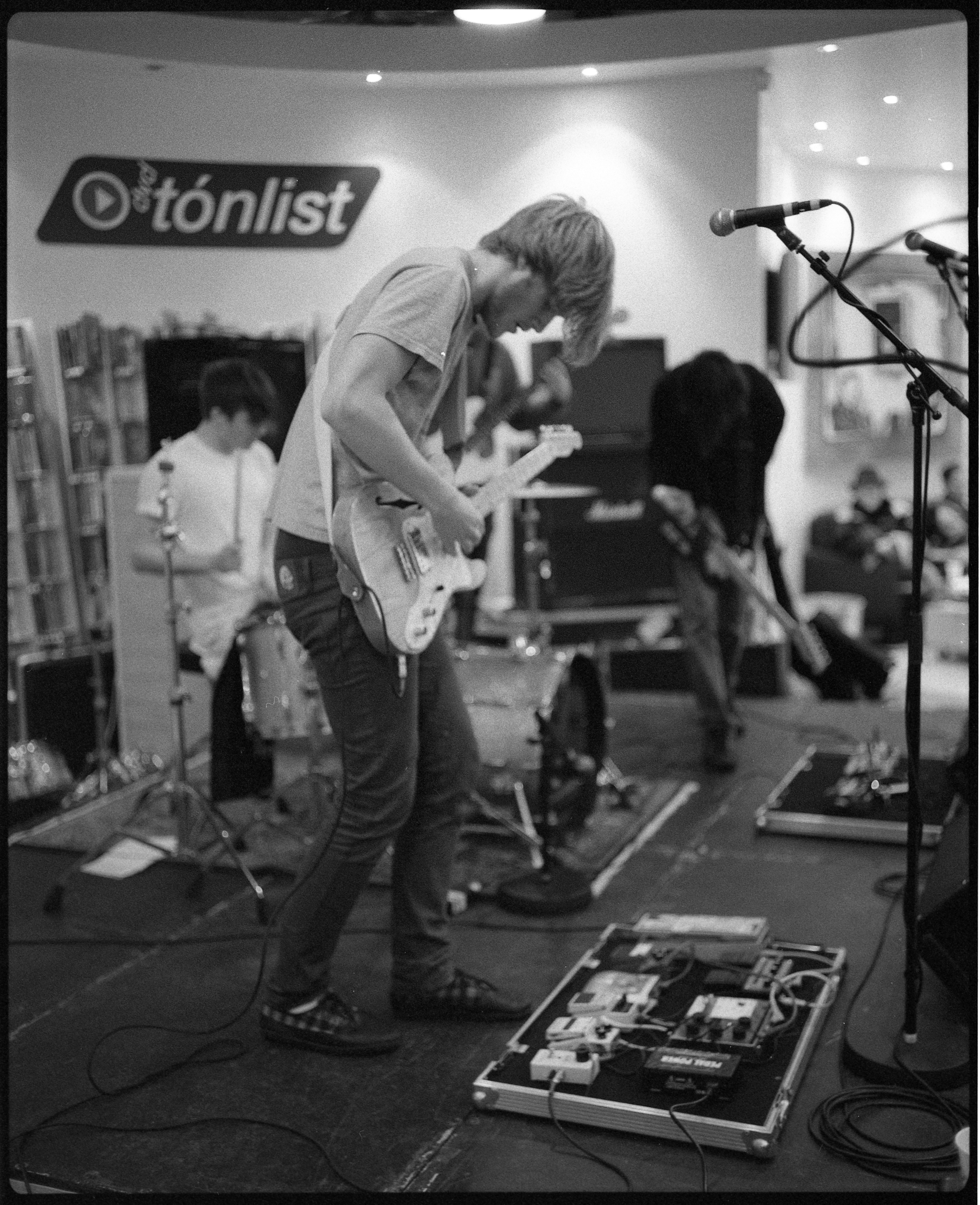
- For a Minor Reflection performing at Skífan in Reykjavík, Iceland during the Iceland Airwaves music festival in October 2008

Background information
- Origin: Reykjavík, Iceland
- Genres: Post-Rock; Experimental Rock; Alternative rock
- Years active: 2005–present
- Label: Unsigned
- Members: Kjartan Hólm; Guðfinnur Sveinsson; Elvar Jón Guðmundsson; Andri Freyr Þorgeirsson
- Past members: Jóhannes Ólafsson
- Website: foraminorrreflection.com at the Wayback Machine (archived August 1, 2015)

For a Minor Reflection is a post-rock band from Reykjavík, Iceland. Their self-produced debut album Reistu þig við, sólin er komin á loft... (which translates as "Rise and shine, the sun is up") featuring six songs lasting an hour in total, all recorded over a weekend in Iceland. The record, as well as their energetic live shows, earned them a slew of accolades, including favourable comparisons to Explosions in the Sky. Their fellow Icelanders Sigur Rós even described them as “a band with the potential to out Mogwai” and invited them on a 15-date European tour with them in November 2008.

== History ==
The band started as a hard rock duo in a garage in Reykjavík, Iceland. The band expanded to an indie rock trio, and later a blues quartet, before finally becoming post-rock instrumentalists.

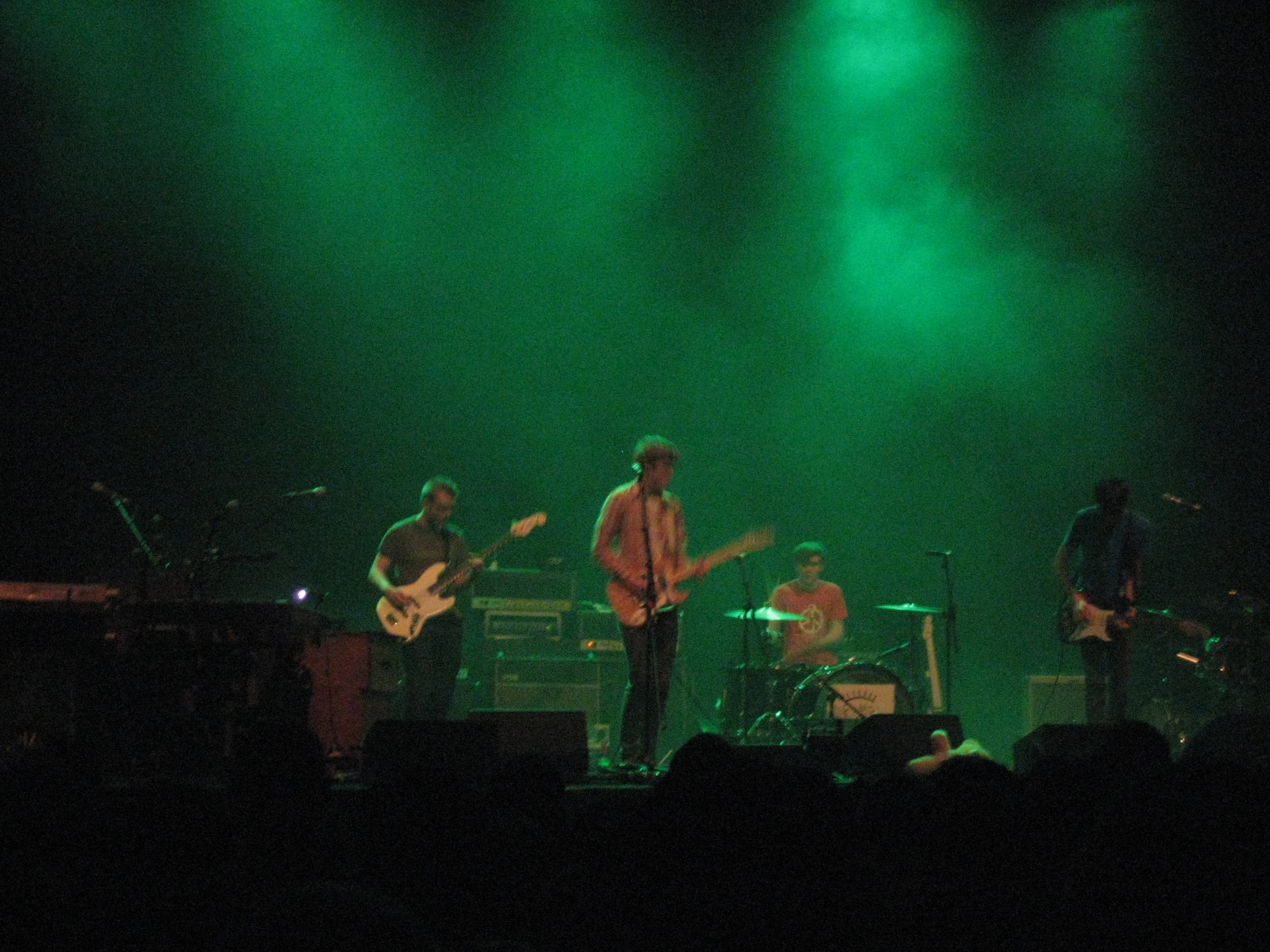
For a Minor Reflection performing in 2008

== Discography ==
- Reistu þig við, sólin er komin á loft... (2007)
- Höldum í átt að óreiðu (2010)
- For a Minor Reflection E.P. (2011)
- Live at Iceland Airwaves (2013)
