= Kjartan Sveinsson =

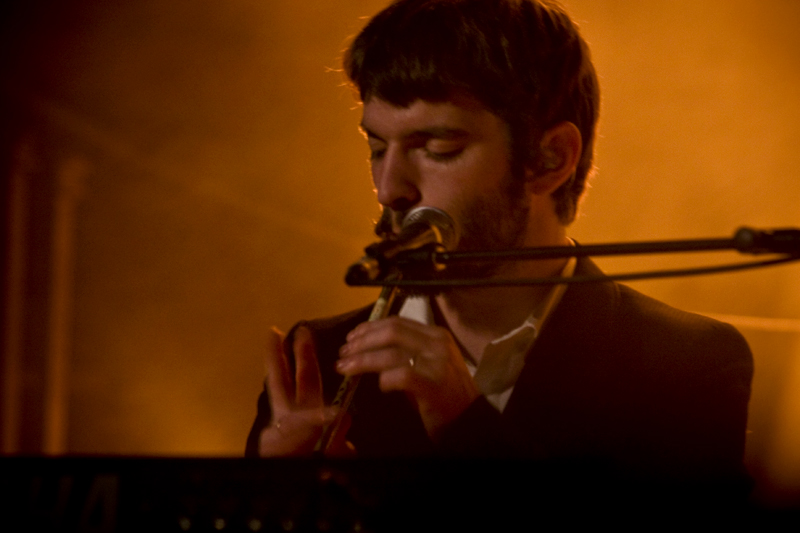
- Kjartan at Methodist Central Hall Westminster, London, in 2008

Background information
- Born: 2 January 1978 (age 48)
- Origin: Iceland
- Genre: Post-rock
- Instruments: Piano; keyboards; flute; tin whistle; oboe; banjo; guitar; bass; vocals
- Years active: 1998–present
- Member of: Sigur Rós (1998–2013, 2022–present)

Kjartan Sveinsson (Icelandic pronunciation: [ˈcʰar̥tan ˈsveinsɔn]; born 2 January 1978) is an Icelandic musician who is the keyboardist for the post-rock band Sigur Rós. He joined the band in 1998. A multi-instrumentalist, he has also played such instruments as the flute, tin whistle, oboe, guitar and the banjo, as well as many of the unorthodox instruments that contribute to Sigur Rós's distinctive sound.

== Career ==
Kjartan has performed under the pseudonym "The Lonesome Traveller" with Sigur Rós bandmate Orri Páll Dýrason and Amiina violinist María Huld Markan Sigfúsdóttir (whom Kjartan married in 2001). "The Lonesome Traveller" covered Sigur Rós songs acoustically in an alt-country style.

Kjartan also composed scores for the 2005 Academy Award nominated short film Síðasti bærinn (The Last Farm) by Rúnar Rúnarsson, for award-winning director Ramin Bahrani's 2009 short film Plastic Bag which features the narration of filmmaker Werner Herzog, and for the 2009 film Ondine directed by Neil Jordan. Kjartan was the composer on Volcano (2011) and Sparrow (2015) both directed by Rúnar Rúnarsson. Kjartan also contributes to Sigur Rós's orchestral and string arrangements, along with the group Amiina. He is also featured heavily on The Album Leaf's album, In a Safe Place, playing a wide variety of instruments.

Kjartan is a member of the advisory board for Kraumur Music Fund, which aims to "strengthen Icelandic musical life, primarily by supporting young musicians in performing and presenting their works."

On 16 November 2010 Kjartan Sveinsson performed in The Whitelight Festival, along with Jonsi & Alex and The Hilliard Ensemble. Kjartan composed Sonnets of his own, as well as the world premiere of his new piece entitled Credo. The performance was streamed live on NPR's website.

On 17 April 2011 Q2 - a listener-supported, New York City-based Internet stream devoted to the music of living composers - along with NPR named Kjartan Sveinsson in a list of "100 Composers Under 40".

In a post on Sigur Rós's Facebook page announcing an "ask me anything" Q&A session with fans via the social news website Reddit on 24 January 2013, the band referred to themselves as being a "now three-piece band." The band confirmed Kjartan Sveinsson's departure during a Reddit Q&A session, stating that "...he has left the band. He said he spent half his life in the band and it was time to do something different."

On 19 February 2014 Kjartan showcased 'his most ambitious musical work' since leaving the band in the form of a collaborative theatre set-piece with Iceland's acclaimed contemporary artist, Ragnar Kjartansson. The work, titled Der Klang Der Offenbarung Des Göttlichen (The Sounds of the Revelation of the Divine) was performed at Berlin’s Volksbühne theatre, in cooperation with the Deutsches Filmorchester Babelsberg and the Filmchor Berlin.

In February 2015, Kjartan Sveinsson again collaborated with Ragnar Kjartansson, being involved in a performance art exhibition at the John Curtin Gallery and the Fremantle Arts Centre in Perth, Australia.

On 14 February 2022, Sigur Rós made a social media post announcing Kjartan was returning to the band.
