= Sundlaugin =

Recording studio in Iceland

Coordinates: 64°10.007′N 21°40.714′W

Sundlaugin Studio
- Type: Recording studio
- Industry: Music
- Founded: 2008
- Area served: Mosfellsbær, Iceland
- Website: www.sundlaugin.com

Sundlaugin (Icelandic pronunciation: [ˈsʏntˌlœyjɪn], the swimming pool) is a recording studio located near Álafoss in the town of Mosfellsbær in Iceland known for being the recording and rehearsal location of post-rock band Sigur Rós. The location was originally a swimming pool built in the 1930s which had been abandoned when Sigur Rós purchased it in 1999 and converted it and adjacent buildings into a studio.

The band originally intended to record their third album, titled ( ), in an abandoned NATO tracking base in the northernmost mountain in Iceland, but after inspection decided it was too impractical. Shortly after they found the abandoned pool lot in a rural neighborhood in Mosfellsbær. They bought the lot and transformed it into a studio. In order to fit the massive mixing console into the building, part of the roof was opened up and the console was lowered with a crane.

Much of the band's photography and artwork is taken from the surrounding landscape, such as the art found on the first album recorded in the studio, ( ).

The recording studio has also been used for recording, mixing and mastering (usually assisted by the studio's sound engineer Birgir Jón "Biggi" Birgisson) by a wide group of mainly Icelandic artists and bands, including:

- Agent Fresco
- The Album Leaf
- Alcest
- amiina
- Amusement Parks on Fire
- Björk
- Bubbi Morthens
- Emmanuel De La Paix
- Flying Hórses
- For a Minor Reflection
- Jakobínarína
- Julianna Barwick
- Langi Seli og Skuggarnir
- Mammút
- Mugison
- Múm
- Ólöf Arnalds
- Retro Stefson
- Seabear
- Self Defense Family
- Sin Fang
- Ske
- Slowblow
- Steindór Andersen
- Stórsveit Nix Noltes

As of 2020, Sundlaugin is owned by Sigur Rós keyboardist Kjartan Sveinsson.
