= Georg Hólm =

Icelandic bass guitarist (born 1976)

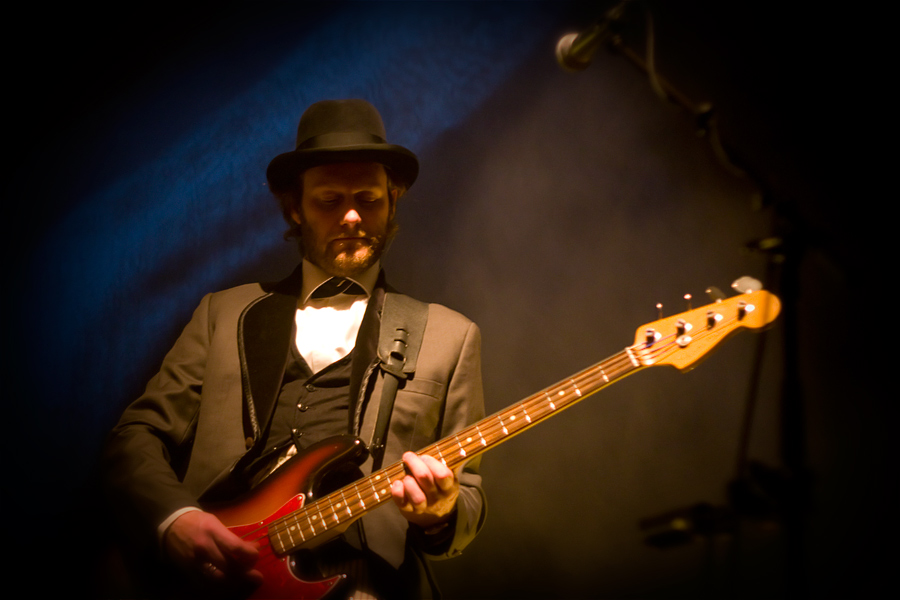
- Georg Hólm performing in 2008

Background information
- Born: 6 April 1976 (age 50); Iceland
- Genres: Post-rock; art rock; dream pop; ambient
- Instruments: Bass; guitar; piano; keyboards; glockenspiel; vocals
- Member of: Sigur Rós

Georg "Goggi" Holm (Icelandic pronunciation: [ˈcɛːɔrk ˈkɔcːɪ ˈhoulm]; born 6 April 1976) is the bassist of the Icelandic post-rock band Sigur Rós.

== Biography ==
=== Personal life ===
He has a wife named Svanhvít Tryggvadóttir. They were married in 2005 by Hilmar Örn Hilmarsson, the allsherjargoði of Ásatrúarfélagið. Georg's father, Haukur, was a news reporter on a local TV station, Stöð 2 (Channel 2) before joining RUV, Iceland's national broadcaster. He is the only member of Sigur Rós without a patronymic name: the majority of Icelanders have a patronym rather than surname. The song "Salka", a former live only song, released on Hvarf/Heim in 2007, is named after his stepdaughter.

Georg has two brothers; one of them is a guitarist in For a Minor Reflection, Kjartan Dagur Holm (1989). The other is Starri Holm, composer and guitarist in the post-punk band Virgin Orchestra.

=== Professional life ===
He and Jónsi are the remaining founding members of Sigur Rós. As do other members of Sigur Rós, he plays multiple instruments during a typical live show. This often includes, in addition to electric and acoustic bass guitars, keyboards, glockenspiel, and drums.

A few days before the release of the album Valtari, a quote was shown on Sigur Rós band's official website saying: "I really can't remember why we started this record, I no longer know what we were trying to do back then. I do know session after session went pear-shaped, we lost focus and almost gave up...did give up for a while. But then something happened and form started to emerge, and now I can honestly say that it's the only Sigur Rós record I have listened to for pleasure in my own house after we've finished it." - Georg
