= Orri Páll Dýrason =

Icelandic drummer

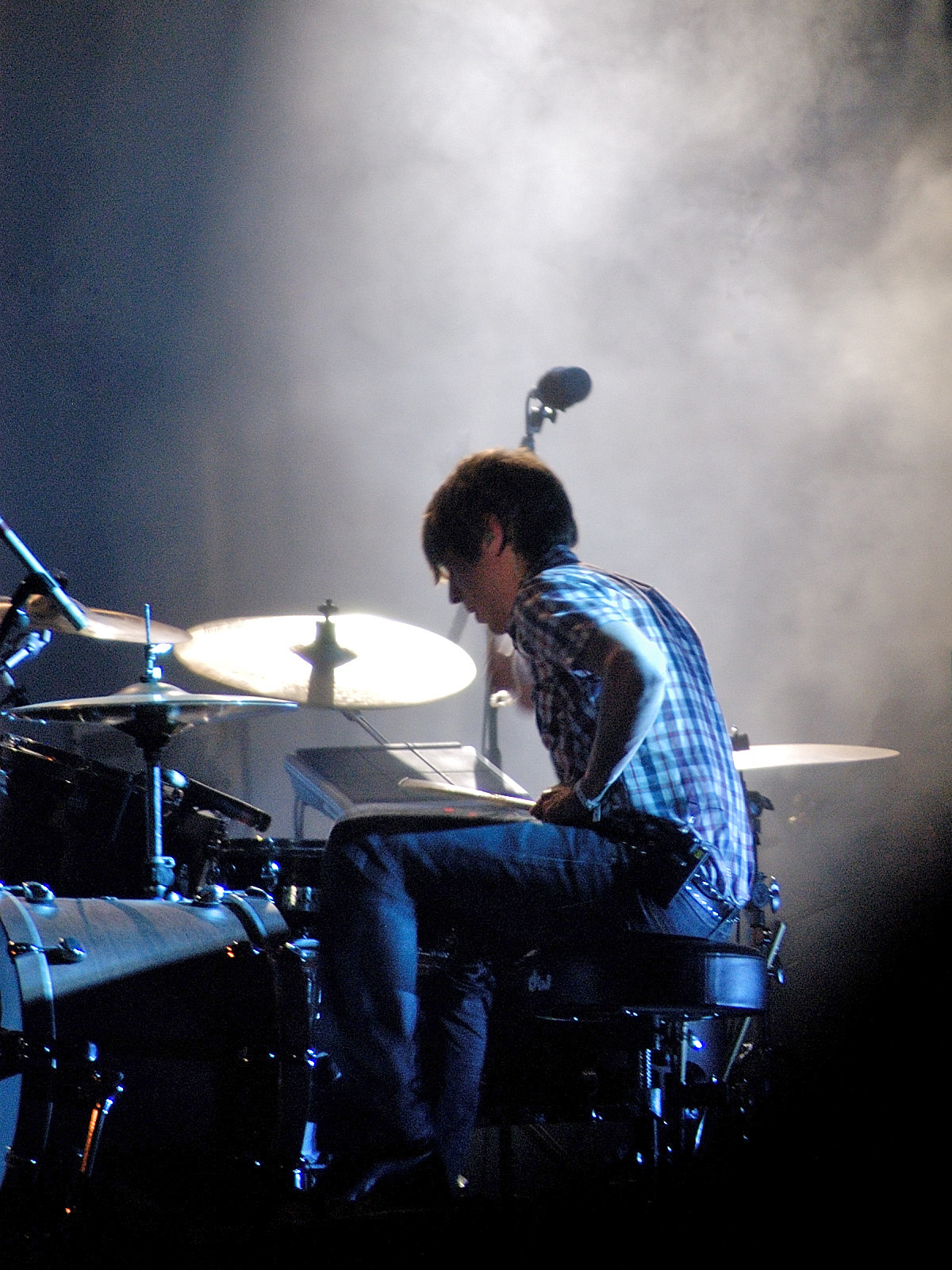
- Orri in 2006

Background information
- Born: Orri Páll Dýrason; 4 July 1977 (age 49)
- Origin: Iceland
- Genres: Post-rock; ambient; art rock; experimental rock; dream pop
- Instruments: Drums; keyboards
- Years active: 1999–2018
- Formerly of: Sigur Rós

Orri Páll Dýrason (Icelandic pronunciation: [ˈɔrːɪ ˈpʰautl ˈtiːrasɔn]; born on 4 July 1977) is an Icelandic musician.

From 1999 till 2018 he was the drummer for the band Sigur Rós, which he joined in 1999, shortly after the recording of the studio album Ágætis byrjun, when the previous drummer, Ágúst Ævar Gunnarsson, left the band.

Orri has recorded five studio albums with Sigur Rós: ( ) (2002), Takk... (2005), Með suð í eyrum við spilum endalaust (2008), Valtari (2012), and Kveikur (2013). He also contributed to Hvarf/Heim (2007), where "Hvarf" contains studio recordings of previously unreleased songs.

== Personal life ==
Orri's father is the former footballer Dýri Guðmundsson, who made five appearances for the Icelandic national team.

Orri has a daughter, Vaka, for whom the first track from the ( ) album is named, and two sons, Dýri Angantýr (born January 2010), and Jón Stormur (born November 2012). He's also the stepfather to his ex-fiancé's daughter, Kría (born July 2008).

In September 2018, he was accused of sexual assault by a fan on Instagram. Orri published a post on Facebook where he claims his innocence but "in light of the scale of this matter" he chose to step down from the band whilst attempting to clear his name.
