= One Day I'll Be on Time =

2001 studio album by the Album Leaf

Studio album by The Album Leaf
- Released: May 22, 2001
- Genre: Post-rock
- Length: 59:38

The Album Leaf chronology
An Orchestrated Rise to Fall (1999)	One Day I'll Be on Time (2001)	In a Safe Place (2004)

Professional ratings
Review scores
Source	Rating
Allmusic	3/5 stars
Pitchfork Media	(5.9/10)

One Day I'll Be on Time is the second album by The Album Leaf.

== Track listing ==
No.	Title	Length
1.	"Gust of…"	5:21
2.	"The MP"	6:21
3.	"Story Board"	4:53
4.	"Wet the Day"	5:25
5.	"The Audio Pool"	4:57
6.	"Hang Over"	4:08
7.	"In Between Lines"	4:04
8.	"Last Time Here"	4:21
9.	"Asleep"	4:59
10.	"The Sailor"	4:37
11.	"Vermillion"	5:42
12.	"Glimmer"	4:44

== Personnel ==
- Jimmy LaValle – producer, engineer, mixing, instrumentation
- Rafter Roberts – engineer, drum programming, mastering
