= In a Safe Place =

Studio album by The Album Leaf
- Released: June 22, 2004
- Genres: Post-rock, ambient
- Length: 51:01
- Labels: Sub Pop; City Slang
- Producers: Jón Þór Birgisson and Jimmy LaValle

The Album Leaf chronology
One Day I'll Be on Time (2001)	In a Safe Place (2004)	Into the Blue Again (2006)

Professional ratings
Aggregate scores
Source	Rating
Metacritic	71/100
Review scores
Source	Rating
AllMusic	3/5 stars
Magic	5/6 stars
musicOMH	(favorable)
Pitchfork Media	(7.9/10)
Stylus	B−

In a Safe Place is an album by The Album Leaf, released in 2004. Recorded in Sigur Rós' Sundlaugin studios, it features collaborations in the recording from Sigur Rós' members and quartet Amiina.

"Window" appears in the 2009 BBC documentary, Armando Iannucci in Milton's Heaven and Hell. "On Your Way" and "Eastern Glow" appear on FOX show The O.C.

== Background and production ==
While previous albums by The Album Leaf had been recorded in Jimmy LaValle's bedroom, by the time of In A Safe Place, LaValle accepted a repeated invitation by Sigur Rós and múm to record in their studio overseas in Mosfellsbaer. Initially, LaValle did not know how to record on the software (Soundscape) used at the Mosfellsbaer studio, but learned while he was there.

LaValle wrote six tracks before going to Iceland, so that he would have room to improvise and collaborate on the remaining portion of the album. The opening track, "Window," was written while LaValle was looking out a window.

As the first The Album Leaf album since LaValle's departure from the band Tristeza, LaValle was able to dedicate more focus to In A Safe Place.

LaValle has said, "Throughout the day [Sigur Rós] members would just poke their heads in and randomly come out and do something. Sometimes I would just leave them alone with the song and they'd record all this stuff."

While LaValle was still with Tristeza, a bandmate had told him that "he didn't like [LaValle's] voice," which "scarred me and sat with [LaValle] for a long time." Still only doing lead vocals on a single track, LaValle used In A Safe Place to "get out of my comfort zone" and overcome reservations about singing.

== Track listing ==
No.	Title	Length
1.	"Window"	3:44
2.	"Thule"	4:23
3.	"On Your Way"	4:31
4.	"Twentytwofourteen"	5:40
5.	"The Outer Banks"	4:23
6.	"Over the Pond"	4:55
7.	"Another Day (Revised)"	4:21
8.	"Streamside"	3:34
9.	"Eastern Glow"	6:06
10.	"Moss Mountain Town"	9:24

== Personnel ==
- Jimmy LaValle – vocals, guitar, synthesizers, keyboards

Sigur Rós :

- Kjartan Sveinsson – guitars, bells, glockenspiel, organs
- Jón Þór Birgisson – acoustic guitar, vocals
- Orri Páll Dýrason – drums
- Pall Jenkins – vocals, guitars
- Gyða Valtýsdóttir – cellos
- Maria Huld Markan Sigfúsdóttir - violins
- Matthew Resovich – violins
- Scott Mercado – drums

== Production notes ==
- On track 7 and on track 8, Jimmy LaValle and Jónsi Birgisson can be heard talking.
- On track 10, at 4:14, a hidden track begins, and at 8:57 people can be heard talking.

== Reception ==
In a Safe Place received generally favorable reviews, with Pitchfork describing the record as "the sound of slowing down," saying that "the record feels tired-but-satisfied, like crawling home after a long night of misadventures, burrowing into the backseat of a cab, squinting your eyes at the light buzzing across the horizon, tying your shoes, and thinking hard about blankets." musicOHM says that, while the album is "a more pop-orientated slant" than Jimmy LaValle's "previous bedroom soundscapes," In A Safe Place remains "a thing of rare beauty."

AllMusic has a lukewarm take to the album, saying "The album is exactly the sum of its parts, perhaps less and definitely no more," sparingly offering that "...one piece hints at the record's full power, 'Over the Pond,' on which LaValle plays a simple, slightly changing Satie line on keyboards while the full Sigur Rós trio are heard for the first time ... playing up their brand of studied melancholy."

Critics are split over the usage of vocals on the album. While Pitchfork says that, of the varied voices on the album, it is LaValle's "own vocal contributions-- his first time singing with The Album Leaf-- that hit first and hardest," musicOHM claims "The few vocal tracks peppering the album tend to anchor the star-gazing into a rather disappointing human form."
