= A Colores =

Studio album by Tristeza
- Released: November 22, 2005
- Recorded: 2005
- Genre: Post rock
- Label: Better Looking Records
- Producer: Tristeza

Professional ratings
Review scores
Source	Rating
Sputnikmusic	link
Metacritic	(71/100)
Prefixmag.com	(6/10)

A Colores is an LP by Tristeza released on November 22, 2005, by Better Looking Records.

== Track listing ==
1. Bromas
2. Balabaristas
3. Abrazo Distante
4. La Tierra Sutil
5. Liquid Pyramids
6. Halo Heads
7. Wand
8. Aereoaviones
9. Cuchillos De Hielo
10. Stumble On Air
11. Harmonic Sea
12. Palindrome Dome

== Personnel ==
- Christopher Sprague - guitar
- Jimmy LaValle - guitar
- Luis Hermosillo - bass
- James Lehner - drums
- Alison Ables - guitar
- Sean Ogilvie - keyboards
- Recorded by: Bill Skibbe, Jessica Ruffins
- Mixed by: Alan Sanderson
