= The Green Album =

The Green Album or Green album may refer to:

- Days of the New (1999 album), colloquially known as the Green Album, by Days of the New
- The Green Album (John S. Hall and King Missile album)
- The Green Album (Kottonmouth Kings album), 2008
- The Green Album (Skankin' Pickle album), 1996
- Green (R.E.M. album), 1988
- Grinspoon (EP) or Green EP, 1995 début EP by Grinspoon
- Gumby (album), a 1989 album colloquially known as the Green Album
- Muppets: The Green Album, a 2011 Disney album featuring covers of Muppet songs by contemporary artists
- Orbital (1991 album), colloquially known as the Green Album, by Orbital
- Weezer (Green Album), 2001 album by Weezer, colloquially known as The Green Album
- Woods IV: The Green Album colloquially known as the Green Album, by Woods of Ypres
- The Green Album (Eddie Jobson album), 1983
- The Green Album, a 1992 album by the Boston Pops Orchestra conducted by John Williams

== See also ==
- Green (disambiguation) § Albums
- The Green EP (disambiguation)
