= The Green EP =

The Green EP may refer to:

- The Green EP (Bibio EP), 2014
- The Green EP (Professor Green EP), 2008

== See also ==
- The Green Album (disambiguation)
- Green Tour EP, by The Album Leaf
