= En Nuestro Desafio =

Studio album by Tristeza
- Released: August 22, 2006
- Recorded: 2006
- Genre: Post rock
- Label: Better Looking Records
- Producer: Tristeza

Professional ratings
Review scores
Source	Rating
Pitchfork Media	(3.3/10.0)

En Nuestro Desafio is a CD/DVD by the instrumental rock band Tristeza. It was released in 2006 on Better Looking Records. The DVD portion contains videos for 12 songs, most of which are not on the CD.

== Track listing ==
=== CD ===
1. Común
2. Wearing the Blues
3. Organ Melts You
4. Cuando Cuando Amor Amor
5. Swoop Me Up
6. Mirror Image
7. Rugidos de Mar
8. Pildora Amargada
9. En Nuestro Desafio

=== DVD ===
1. Peluda Azul
2. Delia's Dream
3. 580
4. Sil
5. Utopia Bridge
6. Lagarta
7. Tokyo Foto
8. Lambs
9. Tricuspid
10. Water Falls Up
11. Bombas Rojas
12. En Nuestro Desafio
