= Woods III: The Deepest Roots and Darkest Blues =

Studio album by Woods of Ypres
- Released: December 5, 2007
- Recorded: 2006–2007
- Studio: Obsidian Sound & Chemical Sound Studios in Toronto, Ontario
- Genre: Melodic black metal, doom metal, neofolk
- Length: 72:40
- Label: Krankenhaus
- Producer: Dan Hulse, David Gold

Woods of Ypres chronology
Pursuit of the Sun & Allure of the Earth (2004)	Woods III: The Deepest Roots and Darkest Blues (2007)	Independent Nature 2002–2007 (2009)

Professional ratings
Review scores
Source	Rating
AllMusic	3.5/5 stars
Exclaim!	Positive
Sputnikmusic	4/5 stars

Woods III: The Deepest Roots and Darkest Blues is the second full-length album and third studio release by Woods of Ypres. It was recorded in 2007 in Toronto, Ontario, and it was the band's last album released before relocating to Sault Ste. Marie, Ontario in 2008. Woods III marked the band's only album to feature bassist/producer Dan Hulse, their last with keyboardist Jessica Rose, and their last album with frontman David Gold on studio drums until Woods 5: Grey Skies & Electric Light in 2012.

Four songs from Woods III were later re-issued in the band's 2009 compilation CD Independent Nature 2002-2007. Though not the last release on the label, this album was Woods of Ypres' last full studio release on Krankenhaus Records before it was succeeded by Gold's new independent label Practical Art Records in 2009.

Similarly to their previous album, and despite its length, material from Woods III was not commonly heard at the band's post-2007 concerts. Only "Your Ontario Town is a Burial Ground" survived into the band's post-2009 setlists (possibly due to Woods of Ypres' shift to a more doom-oriented sound), though "The Northern Cold", "Distractions of Living Alone", and "Thrill of the Struggle" were also played live following the album's release.

A music video for "The Northern Cold" was released in 2007 featuring the performers on Woods III, along with then-members Shawn Stoneman on guitar & Chris Mezzabotta on drums, neither of which performed on any Woods of Ypres albums.

== Track listing ==
All tracks are written by David Gold

No.	Title	Length
1.	"The Northern Cold"	5:31
2.	"Iron Grudge"	3:56
3.	"Your Ontario Town is a Burial Ground"	5:33
4.	"Through Chaos and Solitude I Came..."	4:48
5.	"Years of Silence (and the Private Joke)"	4:25
6.	"Distractions of Living Alone"	6:14
7.	"Deepest Roots: Belief that All is Lost"	2:12
8.	"Darkest Blues: Relief that Nothing Can be Done"	4:54
9.	"Thrill of the Struggle"	6:29
10.	"December in Windsor"	2:59
11.	"Trillium: The Third of Three Winters, 2004–2007" (Instrumental)	4:33
12.	"Song of Redemption"	5:37
13.	"End of Tradition"	5:45
14.	"To Lock Eyes with a Wild Beast"	5:17
15.	"Mistakes Artists Make (The Dream is Dead)"	3:55
Total length:		72:40

== Personnel ==
- David Gold – vocals, drums, guitar
- Jessica Rose – keyboards
- Dan Hulse – bass guitar, vocals
