= Seal Beach (EP) =

EP by the Album Leaf
- Released: 2003
- Recorded: June 2003
- Genre: Post rock
- Labels: Acuarela Discos; Better Looking Records; Eastern Glow Recordings (Vinyl, 2015)

Professional ratings
Review scores
Source	Rating
Pitchfork	(7.6/10)

Seal Beach is an EP by the Album Leaf. It was originally released in Spain in 2003 on Acuarela Discos, and was re-released in 2005 in America by Better Looking Records with five bonus live tracks.

== Original track listing ==
1. Malmo
2. Brennivin
3. Seal Beach
4. Christiansands
5. One Minute

== Re-release track listing ==
1. Malmo
2. Brennivin
3. Seal Beach
4. For Jonathan
5. One Minute
6. Last Time Here (Live)
7. Wet The Day (Live)
8. Essex (Live)
9. The MP (Live)
10. Storyboard (Live)

== Vinyl Release ==
On March 21, 2015, Jimmy LaValle's own Eastern Glow Recordings released the Seal Beach EP on Vinyl.
