= Rafter (band) =

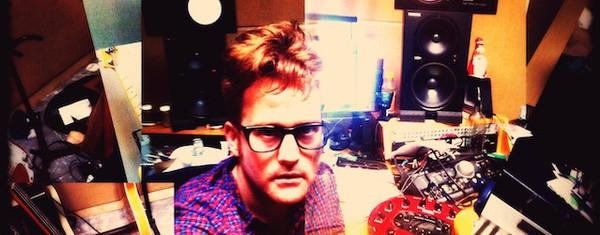

Background information
- Origin: San Diego, California, United States
- Genres: Indie pop
- Years active: 2006–present
- Labels: Asthmatic Kitty, Joyful Noise Recordings
- Website: Rafter's Official Site; Rafter on MySpace

Rafter is the performing name of the American musician and producer Rafter Roberts. He owns his own studio, Singing Serpent, in San Diego, California, United States.

In 2005 he formed the project Bunky (a combination of the words "bunny" and "monkey") with Emily Joyce. They released one album, Born To Be A Motorcycle (Asthmatic Kitty, 2005).

In January 2019 he started a megaseries of Rafter releases with the album Terrestrial Extras and set a release schedule of a new Rafter album every month for the duration of the year.

== Discography ==
=== Albums ===
- Sweaty Magic (Asthmatic Kitty, 2008)
- Sex Death Cassette (Asthmatic Kitty)
- Music for Total Chickens (Asthmatic Kitty, 2007)
- 10 Songs (Rafter) (Asthmatic Kitty, 2006)
- Born to be a Motorcycle as a member of Bunky
- Animal Feelings (Asthmatic Kitty, 2010)
- Quiet Storm (Asthmatic Kitty, 2011)
- It's Reggae (Asthmatic Kitty, 2014)
- XYZ (Joyful Noise Recordings, 2016)
- Terrestrial Extras (Rad Lazer, January 2019)
- Rhythm Box (Rad Lazer, February 2019)
- Omnivore (Rad Lazer, March 2019)

=== Producer ===
- Part I: John Shade, Your Fortune's Made by Fol Chen (2009)
- Various Soul-Junk and Castanets albums
- The Rapture - Mirror debut EP
- The Fiery Furnaces - Rehearsing My Choir
- Shapes and Sizes
- GoGoGo Airheart
- The Album Leaf

=== Performer ===
- Bunky
- The Free*Stars
- Various Soul-Junk and Castanets albums
