= On!Air!Library! =

American band

- Origin: New York, New York, United States
- Genres: Post-rock, ambient music, experimental music
- Years active: 1998-2005, 2025 to present
- Labels: BELLHOP, Arena Rock Recording Co., Pretty Activity
- Spinoffs: School of Seven Bells, Daylight's for the Birds
- Members: Phillip Wann; Claudia Deheza
- Past members: Alejandra Deheza

On!Air!Library! is an American post-rock/ambient/experimental rock band from New York City, formed in 1998 by Claudia Deheza and Phillip Wann. Shortly thereafter, Claudia’s twin sister Alejandra joined the band and they began playing local venues and parties. The trio released their first self-titled EP on their own Bellhop label in 2001 and eventually landed a deal with Arena Rock Recording Co. in 2002. In 2003 OAL released a split EP with The Album Leaf, entitled A_Lifetime_or_More. followed in 2004 by their self-titled debut album released by ARRCO on CD and Pretty Activity on vinyl. Later that year, after playing a few shows on the East Coast of the United States with Xiu Xiu, OAL embarked on a US tour with Interpol and The Secret Machines. In 2005, On! Air! Library! disbanded. The Deheza sisters both became involved in a new project, School of Seven Bells, with former Secret Machines guitarist Benjamin Curtis. while Wann continued recording music with and without Claudia, releasing records under the names Girabbe and Daylight’s for the Birds. In 2025 Wann resurrected the name On!Air!Library! under which he released a pair of experimental records, and in 2026 Claudia rejoined the fold, coinciding with OAL's twenty-five year anniversary and the rerelease of their first EP on 12” vinyl. The duo will release OAL 4 in fall 2026 as a double 7” with a gatefold sleeve and colored vinyl on their Bellhop label with more to releases to follow.

== Discography ==
=== Albums ===
- On!Air!Library! (EP) (2001)
- A Lifetime or More split EP with The Album Leaf (2003)
- On!Air!Library! (2004)

=== Other releases ===
- "Bambalance" on The Manchurian Candidate film soundtrack (2004)
- "Snow Miser" on The Night Before: A New York Christmas
