= Pursuit of the Sun & Allure of the Earth =

Studio album by Woods of Ypres
- Released: August 14, 2004
- Recorded: April–July 2004
- Studio: Spectre Sound Studios in Tecumseh, Ontario
- Genre: Melodic black metal, doom metal, neofolk
- Length: 61:11
- Label: Krankenhaus Records
- Producer: Glenn Fricker

Woods of Ypres chronology
Against the Seasons: Cold Winter Songs from the Dead Summer Heat (2002)	Pursuit of the Sun & Allure of the Earth (2004)	Woods III: The Deepest Roots and Darkest Blues (2008)

Professional ratings
Review scores
Source	Rating
Chronicles of Chaos	4/10
Sputnikmusic	4.5/5 stars

Pursuit of the Sun & Allure of the Earth is the first full-length album and second studio release by the Canadian metal band Woods of Ypres. It was recorded in 2004 at Spectre Sound in Tecumseh, Ontario. This marked Woods of Ypres' first release with David Gold on vocals and guitar as well as drums, along with the first appearance of keyboardist Jessica Rose. Steve Jones and Connor Sharpe supplied most of the lead guitar and bass work for this album, but were uncredited in the album booklet due to leaving Woods of Ypres before its release.

Four songs from this album were later re-issued in Woods of Ypres' 2009 compilation CD Independent Nature 2002-2007. That same year, the band re-released their song Allure of the Earth from this album as a vinyl-only single, accompanied by a cover of it by Australian cellists Sebastian Simpson and Chris Doig.

Songs from this album were not a frequent sight at recent Woods of Ypres concerts. Only "The Sun Was in My Eyes (Part I)" has been documented as a full setlist addition since 2009, though shortened versions of "Summer's Envy" and "The Ghosts of Summers Past" have been played in a medley style occasionally in the band's later years.

== Track listing ==
All tracks are written by David Gold.

No.	Title	Length
1.	"Intro: The Looming of Dust in the Dark (& the Illumination)"	2:49
2.	"The Will to Give"	7:35
3.	"The Sun Was in My Eyes (Part One)"	6:29
4.	"The Sun Was in My Eyes (Part Doom)"	7:13
5.	"Allure of the Earth"	6:20
6.	"Shedding the Deadwood"	5:23
7.	"Dragged Across a Forest Floor"	9:19
8.	"Summer's Envy"	4:44
9.	"The Ghosts of Summer's Past"	5:55
10.	"Outro: The End of August"	5:24
Total length:		61:11

== Personnel ==
Woods of Ypres

- David Gold – vocals, drums, guitars, bass
- Jessica Rose – keyboard
- Steve Jones – guitar
- Connor Sharpe – bass

Additional personnel

- Sarah Green – backing vocals on "The Ghosts of Summers Past" and "Outro: The End of August"
- Glenn Fricker – Engineer
