= Into the Blue Again =

Studio album by The Album Leaf
- Released: September 12, 2006
- Genre: Post-rock
- Length: 52:33
- Label: Sub Pop

The Album Leaf chronology
In a Safe Place (2004)	Into the Blue Again (2006)	A Chorus of Storytellers (2010)

Professional ratings
Aggregate scores
Source	Rating
Metacritic	67/100
Review scores
Source	Rating
AllMusic	3/5 stars
Chicago Sun-Times	(favorable)
Pitchfork Media	(6.8/10)

Into the Blue Again is the fourth album by The Album Leaf, released in 2006.

== Track listing ==
1. "The Light" – 4:29
  - Jimmy LaValle – Rhodes Piano, Bass, Organ, Voyager, Synthesizer
  - Ryan Hadlock – Space Echo
  - Matthew Resovich – Violin
2. "Always for You" – 5:07
  - Jimmy LaValle – Vocals, Rhodes Piano, Guitar, Synth Bass, Bass, Synthesizers, Organ, Drums, Drum Programming
3. "Shine" – 5:53
  - Jimmy LaValle – Rhodes Piano, Keyboards, Synthesizers, Bass, Glockenspiel, Drums, Drum Programming
  - Joshua Eustis – Drum Programming
  - Matthew Resovich – Violin
4. "Writings on the Wall" – 4:55
  - Jimmy LaValle – Vocals, Rhodes Piano, Murf, Synthesizers, Bass, Drums
  - Matthew Resovich – Violin
5. "Red-Eye" – 7:01
  - Jimmy LaValle – Rhodes Piano, Grand Piano, Murf, Synthesizers, Synth Bass, Drum Programming
  - Joshua Eustis – Drum Programming
  - Matthew Resovich – Violin
6. "See in You" – 4:37
  - Jimmy LaValle – Rhodes Piano, Organ, Synthesizers, Drum Programming
  - Drew Andrews – Guitar
7. "Into the Sea" – 4:31
  - Jimmy LaValle – Rhodes Piano, Murf, Synth Bass, Bass, Drums, Drum Programming
  - Matthew Resovich – Violin
  - Drew Andrews – Guitar
8. "Wherever I Go" – 4:38
  - Jimmy LaValle – Vocals, Rhodes Piano, Grand Piano, Synthesizer, Bass, Drums
  - Matthew Resovich – Violin
  - Drew Andrews – Guitar
  - Pall Jenkins – Vocals
9. "Wishful Thinking" – 5:32
  - Jimmy LaValle – Grand Piano, Acoustic Guitar, Glockenspiel
  - Matthew Resovich – Violin
  - Ryan Hadlock – Space Echo
10. "Broken Arrow" – 5:50
  - Jimmy LaValle – Rhodes Piano, Organ, Synthesizers, Synth Bass, Drum Programming, Cricket Sound
  - Matthew Resovich – Violin
  - Joshua Eustis – Cowbell Synth, Drum Programming
