= A Chorus of Storytellers =

Studio album by The Album Leaf
- Released: February 2, 2010
- Genre: Post-rock
- Label: Sub Pop

The Album Leaf chronology
Into the Blue Again (2006)	A Chorus of Storytellers (2010)	Forward/Return (2012)

Professional ratings
Aggregate scores
Source	Rating
Metacritic	69/100
Review scores
Source	Rating
AllMusic	3/5 stars
The A.V. Club	B−
Clash	7/10
Drowned in Sound	6/10
Pitchfork	6.3/10
Tiny Mix Tapes	1.5/5 stars

A Chorus of Storytellers is the fifth studio album by The Album Leaf, released in 2010 by Sub Pop.

The album was recorded by Ryan Hadlock in the frosty month of February 2009 at Bear Creek Studio just outside Seattle. It was mixed in the decidedly warmer month of June in Reykjavík, Iceland by Birgir Jon Birgisson.

== Track list ==
1. Perro
2. Blank Pages
3. There Is A Wind
4. Within Dreams
5. Falling From The Sun
6. Stand Still
7. Summer Fog
8. Until The Last
9. We Are
10. Almost There
11. Tied Knots
