= Woods of Ypres =

Canadian metal band

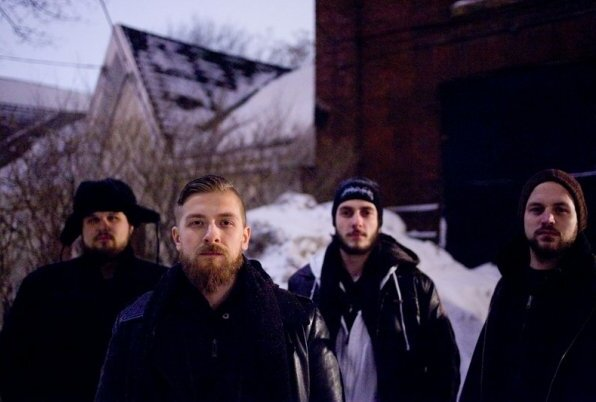
- Woods of Ypres in 2009. L–R: Bryan Belleau, David Gold, Steve Furgiuele, and Evan Madden.

Background information
- Origin: Windsor, Ontario, Canada
- Genres: Melodic black metal; doom metal; gothic metal
- Years active: 2002–2011
- Labels: Krankenhaus; Practical Art; Earache
- Past members: David Gold; Bryan Belleau; Steve Furgiuele; Evan Madden; Aaron Palmer; Dustin Black; Robin Cross

Woods of Ypres was a Canadian blackened doom metal band from Windsor, Ontario. It was founded in 2002, initially consisting of three members: David Gold, Aaron Palmer and Brian McManus. Their line-up frequently changed afterward, with over 20 members in the band through its various incarnations, which saw operations later based out of Toronto from 2003 to 2007, and Sault Ste. Marie from 2008 to 2011. Their only constant member was multi-instrumentalist and frontman David Gold, with the band ending after his death in December 2011, just before releasing their album Woods 5: Grey Skies & Electric Light, which won the 2013 Juno Award for the Metal/Hard Music Album of the Year.

The band enjoyed the most popularity in the area surrounding Windsor, where they originated. David Gold's vocals have drawn comparisons to the late Peter Steele.

== History ==
=== Formation and transformation ===
Woods of Ypres was formed in Windsor, Ontario in 2002 by David Gold, Aaron Palmer and Brian McManus. The trio released the first Woods of Ypres demo, Against the Seasons: Cold Winter Songs from the Dead Summer Heat, the same year. After McManus' departure that same year, Woods of Ypres expanded to a quintet with new band members.

Northern Lights Fest 2003 (L-R: Aaron Palmer, Dustin Black, Robin Cross, David Gold)

That December, David Gold moved to Toronto to begin working on a full-length album, completely overhauling their line-up in the process. Following the departure of singer Chris Jones, David took over as Woods of Ypres' lead singer and guitarist. In 2004, the band's first full-length album, Pursuit of the Sun & Allure of the Earth, was released on David Gold's record label, Krankenhaus Records.

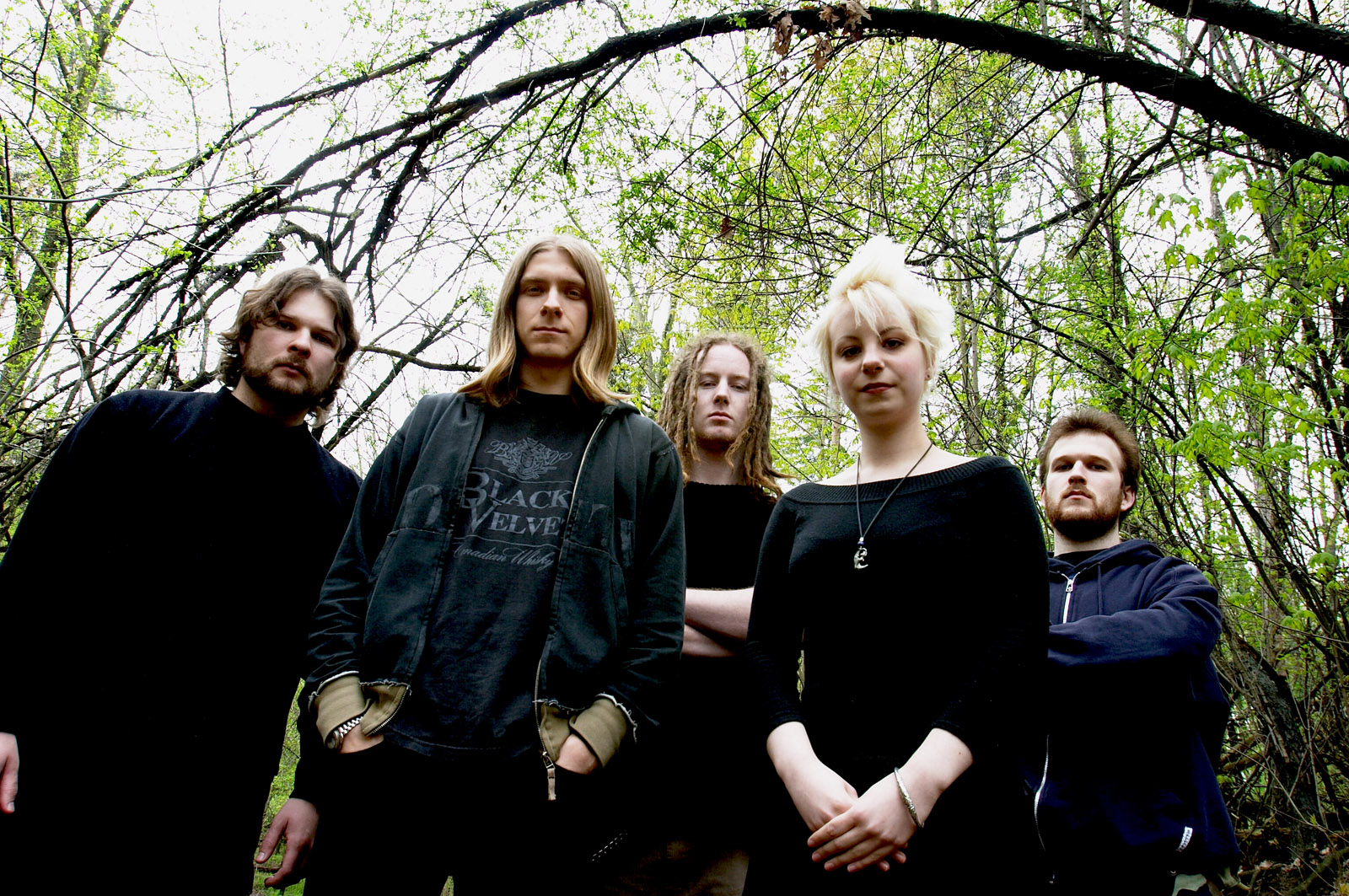
Woods of Ypres 2004 (L–R: Chris Jones, David Gold, Connor Sharpe, Jessica Rose, Steve Jones)

The third Woods of Ypres album, Woods III: The Deepest Roots and Darkest Blues, was released at the end of 2007. Contrasting the two albums, critic Laura Taylor wrote, "While Pursuit of the Sun verged on metalized Pink Floyd, Woods' latest unearths more of the band's black and dark metal inspirations". In 2008, the band was featured on the cover of Unrestrained! Magazine.

Woods of Ypres 2006 (L-R: Dan Hulse, David Gold, Jessica Rose)

After a work stint in South Korea, David Gold moved the band to his hometown of Sault Ste. Marie, Ontario in 2008, where he united with existing local metal band Gates of Winter to both form the core of the new six-piece Woods of Ypres line-up, and join Gates of Winter himself on drums. After a series of line-up changes and departures, they recorded their fourth album Woods IV: The Green Album the following year. Released in November 2009, Exclaim! called it "the band's most amorphous and powerful creature so far." Earlier in 2009, Woods of Ypres also put out a compilation of twelve of the songs from their three main Krankenhaus-released albums entitled Independent Nature 2002–2007 and a vinyl-only single release of their 2004 song "Allure of the Earth", which also featured a cover of that song by Australian cellists Sebastian Simpson and Chris Doig.

Woods of Ypres 2009 (L-R: Steve Furgiuele, Evan Madden, David Gold, Bryan Belleau)

Sessions towards an unreleased EP named Woods 4.5: You Were The Light were made in Sault Ste. Marie in 2010 as well, but just two tracks from those sessions have been released as part of a vinyl-only single named Home in 2011, which has retroactively been referred to as Woods 4.5 in some interviews. Woods of Ypres announced their break-up in late 2010 partly due to frontman David Gold's move to Kuwait for work reasons, but it was announced that fall that the split was entirely false, and that Woods of Ypres had signed to Earache Records, who would later put out the band's last two studio albums.

Woods of Ypres' line-ups had been noticeably unstable since their inception, with only David Gold participating on every release by the band. Woods of Ypres' live line-ups ranged from three to six members at differing points, with line-ups almost completely changing when Gold relocated the band, while two of their full-length albums only credit two musicians as full band members. Singles and compilations aside, the only band member to appear on two of the band's main albums other than Gold was keyboardist Jessica Rose, who performed on both Pursuit of the Sun & Allure of the Earth and Woods III.

All of Woods of Ypres's albums (except Woods V) saw their initial release or pre-2011 reissues on independent labels ran by David Gold, including Krankenhaus Records from 2004 to 2009, and Practical Art Records from 2009 to 2011. While Krankenhaus released albums by a few different Canadian metal bands, Practical Art only released albums from musical projects that Gold was a performer on. As well, Woods of Ypres were notorious for their independently run and booked headlining tours of Canada and the United States.

=== Death of David Gold and break-up ===
Woods of Ypres played what would turn out to be their last concert in Richmond, Virginia on June 9, 2011. After the dismissal of Shane and Evan Madden shortly afterward, remaining band members David Gold and Joel Violette recorded the band's final studio album Woods 5: Grey Skies & Electric Light that August at Beach Road Studios in Goderich, Ontario.

On December 21, 2011, David Gold died at age 31, in a car crash near Barrie, Ontario. Gold's death ended plans for Woods of Ypres to play their first European tour in early 2012, along with scuttling the planned debuts of new band members Brendan Hayter and Rae Amitay. Guitarist Joel Violette indicated in interviews that Woods of Ypres would not carry on recording or touring without Gold, effectively ending the band. Woods 5 was released on February 27, 2012, in Europe, with the North American release coming two months later. The band received a posthumous Juno nomination in the Metal/Hard Music Album of the Year category in February 2013, and won the award in April.

Official tribute concerts in Toronto and Sault Ste. Marie were held in April 2012, featuring bands such as Kittie and Novembers Doom. The Toronto concert served as the CD release party for Woods 5, while Sault Ste. Marie saw Woods of Ypres former band members Joel Violette, Bryan Belleau, and Rae Amitay play an acoustic set of Woods of Ypres material. A Woods of Ypres tribute album has been released, while the surviving members of Woods of Ypres' final line-up have since joined forces in the New Brunswick-based black metal band Thrawsunblat.

== Band members ==
=== Final line-up ===
- David Gold — drums (2002–2004, 2005–2008), guitar, vocals (2004–2011; died 2011)
- Joel Violette — guitar, studio bass (2010–2011)

=== Former ===
- Brian McManus — guitar, vocals (2002)
- Aaron Palmer — bass, vocals (2002–2003)
- Robin Cross — vocals (2002–2003)
- Dustin Black — guitars (2003)
- Colin Wysman — guitars (2003)
- Chris Jones — vocals (2003–2004)
- Steve Jones — guitars (2003–2004)
- Jordan Buryj — guitars (2003–2004)
- Connor Sharpe — bass (2003–2004)
- Mark Beshai — guitars (2003–2004)
- Jessica Rose — keyboards (2004–2007)
- Adam Wathan — guitars (2005)
- Dan Hulse — bass guitar, vocals (2005–2007)
- Chris "Mezz" Mezzabotta — drums (2005)
- Shawn Stoneman — guitars (2007)
- Evan Madden — drums (2008–2011)
- Lee Maines — guitars (2008)
- Brian Holmes — keyboards (2008)
- Steve Furgiuele — bass (2008–2009)
- Bryan Belleau — guitar (2008–2010)
- Shane Madden — bass (2009–2011)

== Discography ==
=== Studio albums ===
- Pursuit of the Sun & Allure of the Earth (2004, Krankenhaus Records)
- Woods III: The Deepest Roots and Darkest Blues (2007, Krankenhaus Records)
- Woods IV: The Green Album (2009, Practical Art Records, Earache Records)
- Woods 5: Grey Skies & Electric Light (2012, Earache Records)

=== EPs ===
- Against the Seasons: Cold Winter Songs from the Dead Summer Heat (2002, Krankenhaus Records, Night Birds Records)

=== Compilations ===
- Independent Nature 2002–2007 – compilation (2009, Krankenhaus Records)

=== Singles ===
- Allure of the Earth – vinyl single (2009, Krankenhaus Records)
- Home – vinyl single (2011, Practical Art Records)
