= Ravens & Chimes =

Indie rock band

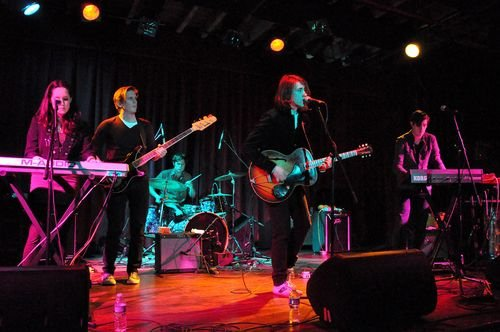
- Asher Lack, Avery Brooks, Rebecca Jean Rossi, Michael Riddleberger, Patrick Ford

Background information
- Origin: New York, New York, U.S.
- Years active: 2005-present
- Labels: Better Looking
- Members: Asher Lack, Avery Brooks, Michael Riddleberger, David Dawda
- Website: http://ravensandchimes.com/

Ravens & Chimes is an indie art rock band from New York City.

== Formation (2005) ==
Formed in 2005 while studying music and film at New York University, the band was picked up by Grey Rock Records/Better Looking Records after a demo of their song "The House Where You Were Born" made its way from a friend at a party to Colin Reef, owner of Grey Rock, and SVP/CFO of Rhino Records. Asher Lack, the singer and principal songwriter of the band, is the son of downtown New York artist and former actor Stephen Lack.

== Reichenbach Falls (2006-2008) ==
Their debut album Reichenbach Falls was recorded by Howard Bilerman and Brian Paulson at The Hotel2Tango in 2006 and released on October 9, 2007, via Grey Rock/ Better Looking Records. The album was mastered by Harris Newman of Grey Market Mastering in Montreal.

The group gained additional notability by releasing a cover of Leonard Cohen's song "So Long, Marianne" which even garnered them praise from Cohen himself. In 2008, German Snowboarding company Isenseven licensed the Reichenbach Falls track "This Is Where We Are".

== Holiday Life/Carousel EP (2009-present) ==
The band recorded their second album, Holiday Life, with Howard Bilerman and Larry Crane. On February 23, 2011, it was announced that three songs from the unreleased album were licensed to the MTV show Skins (North American TV series), aired in two episodes on March 7 and March 14, 2011. The songs were concurrently released as the iTunes exclusive Carousel EP. The Holiday Life full-length was officially released by Better Looking Records on April 3, 2012.

== Live shows ==
The band has played shows supporting White Rabbits, Dan Deacon, The Joy Formidable, The Whigs, Holly Miranda, Frightened Rabbit, Rogue Wave, Voxtrot, Hanne Hukkelberg, Har Mar Superstar, Billy Bragg, Tim Fite, French Kicks, The Watson Twins, The Fiery Furnaces, Other Lives, Walk the Moon, Jens Lekman and opened for Sondre Lerche at SXSW 2011.

In January 2012, the band announced their first European tour. The band toured Europe again in November and December 2012 with festival dates including the Autumn Falls Festival in Belgium, Le Guess Who? Festival in the Netherlands and the Kilbi Exil Festival in Switzerland.

== Personnel ==
=== Current members ===
- Asher Lack (vocals, guitar)
- Avery Brooks (keyboards)
- Dave Dawda (bass)
- Mike Riddleberger (drums)

=== Former members and additional musicians ===
- Abe Pollack (bass)
- Brittany Anjou (piano, glockenspiel, vocals)
- Patrick Ford (bass)
- Maya Joseph-Goteiner (violin)
- Nora Kelleher (vocals, flute)
- Rebecca Jean Rossi (piano, vocals)
- Mike Thies (drums)
- Rich Levinson (drums)
- James Windsor-Wells (drums)
- Joel Zifkin (violin)
