= A Lifetime or More =

EP by the Album Leaf and On! Air! Library!
- Released: 2003
- Recorded: Fall–winter 2002
- Genre: Post rock
- Label: Arena Rock

Professional ratings
Review scores
Source	Rating
Alternative Press	3/5

A Lifetime or More is a split EP by the Album Leaf and On! Air! Library!. The first three tracks are by the former band, and the last five tracks by the latter band.The recording sessions took place in Fall–Winter 2002, with the EP ultimately spanning eight tracks. The first three tracks are by The Album Leaf, characterized by ambient, keyboard-driven washes; the remaining five belong to On! Air! Library!, showcasing a more structured, chamber-pop–electronica fusion.

== Track listing ==
1. The Album Leaf – Another Day
2. The Album Leaf – Essex
3. The Album Leaf – Lamplight
4. On! Air! Library! – Ex's and ~~ho's~~ oh's
5. On! Air! Library! – Pass the Mic (p)
6. On! Air! Library! – Pass the Mic (a)
7. On! Air! Library! – Pass the Mic (c)
8. On! Air! Library! – Faux Fromm
