= Dream Signals in Full Circles =

Studio album by Tristeza
- Released: 2000
- Recorded: April 2000
- Genre: Post rock
- Label: Tigerstyle Records
- Producer: Dave Trumfio

Professional ratings
Review scores
Source	Rating
AllMusic	4/5 stars
Pitchfork	3.5/10

Dream Signals in Full Circles is an LP by Tristeza, released on Tigerstyle Records in 2000.

== Production ==
The album was recorded at Kingsize studio, in Chicago, and was produced by Dave Trumfio.

== Critical reception ==
AllMusic wrote that "the one most overt Krautrocking number of the bunch, 'Auroura Borealis', is pretty much a shorter version of Neu!'s 'Fur Immer', but it makes up for the near plagiarism with yet another soaring yet deceptively simple guitar solo that evokes a beautiful blue sky to go with the open road." Exclaim! wrote that the album "contains epic pop gems that give atmosphere to whatever room it's played in." Phoenix New Times called it "sweet, viscous instrumental rock," writing that "it may be some of the most beautifully expansive music you hear this year."

The Washington Post praised the "elastic, jazzy rhythm section that works in great counterpoint to guitarist Jimmy Lavalle's ringing lead lines." The Tallahassee Democrat thought that "the album title is a perfect description of the band's instrumental approach, which blends rock with smooth beats and jazzed-up tempos." The Arizona Republic wrote that Dream Signals in Full Circles "combines shimmering guitars with gently minimalist rhythms and Stereolab-style tape loops."

== Track listing ==
1. "Building Peaks" – 4:51
2. "Respirá" – 4:37
3. "City of the Future" – 5:53
4. "Shifty Drifty" – 3:46
5. "Auroura Borealis" [sic] – 4:40
6. "I Am a Cheetah" – 5:27
7. "Chiaroscuro" – 6:22
8. "Are We People" – 4:04
9. "Opiate Slopes" – 5:37

== Personnel ==
- Christopher Sprague - guitar
- Jimmy LaValle - guitar
- Luis Hermosillo - bass
- James Lehner - drums
