= Forward/Return =

EP by The Album Leaf
- Released: 2012
- Recorded: Spring 2012
- Genre: Ambient, post-rock, electronica, acoustic
- Length: 35:12
- Label: Eastern Glow Recordings
- Producer: Jimmy LaValle

The Album Leaf chronology
A Chorus of Storytellers (2010)	Forward/Return (2012)	Between Waves (2016)

Forward/Return is an EP release by The Album Leaf, available as of September 18, 2012.

== Track listing ==
No.	Title	Length
1.	"Stretched Home"	5:03
2.	"Descent"	5:03
3.	"Low Down"	4:30
4.	"Skylines"	5:08
5.	"Under the Night"	5:26
6.	"Images"	4:11
7.	"Dark Becomes Light"	5:05
