= Independent Nature 2002–2007 =

Compilation album by Woods of Ypres
- Released: April 20, 2009
- Recorded: 2002–2007 in Tecumseh & Toronto, Ontario
- Genre: Melodic black metal, doom metal, neofolk
- Length: 80:10
- Label: Krankenhaus Records
- Producer: David Gold, Dan Hulse

Woods of Ypres chronology
Woods III: The Deepest Roots and Darkest Blues (2008)	Independent Nature 2002–2007 (2009)	Woods IV: The Green Album (2009)

Independent Nature 2002–2007 is a compilation album released by Ontario blackened doom metal band Woods of Ypres in 2009. The only compilation released by Woods of Ypres, this album was both the band's first release after relocating to Sault Ste. Marie, Ontario in 2008 and their last full-length release through Krankenhaus Records. Four songs each from Woods of Ypres' first three albums (Against the Seasons: Cold Winter Songs from the Dead Summer Heat, Pursuit of the Sun & Allure of the Earth, and Woods III: The Deepest Roots and Darkest Blues) were included on this CD, and were presented in chronological order, documenting notable tracks from the band's early black metal-centric era.

== Track listing ==
No.	Title	Length
1.	"Intro: The Shams of Optimism"	3:01
2.	"Crossing the 45th Parallel"	6:47
3.	"The Sea of Immeasurable Loss"	7:07
4.	"A Meeting Place and Time"	8:47
5.	"The Will to Give"	7:35
6.	"The Sun Was in My Eyes (Part II)"	7:13
7.	"Allure of the Earth"	6:20
8.	"Dragged Across a Forest Floor"	9:19
9.	"The Northern Cold"	5:31
10.	"Your Ontario Town is a Burial Ground"	5:33
11.	"Distractions of Living Alone"	6:14
12.	"Thrill of the Struggle"	6:29
Total length:		80:10

== Personnel ==
- David Gold – vocals & guitar on tracks 5–12, bass on tracks 5–8, and drums on all tracks
- Brian McManus – vocals & guitar on tracks 1–4
- Aaron Palmer – vocals on tracks 1–3 and bass on tracks 1–4
- Steve Jones – guitar on tracks 5–8 (uncredited)
- Connor Sharpe – bass on tracks 5–8 (uncredited)
- Dan Hulse – bass & backing vocals on tracks 9–12
- Jessica Rose – keyboard on tracks 5–12
