= An Orchestrated Rise to Fall =

Studio album by The Album Leaf
- Released: 1999
- Recorded: September–December 1998
- Genre: Post-rock
- Length: 51:04
- Labels: Music Fellowship, Linkwork

The Album Leaf chronology
An Orchestrated Rise to Fall (1999)	One Day I'll Be on Time (2001)

Professional ratings
Review scores
Source	Rating
Allmusic	2/5 stars
PopMatters	8/10 stars

An Orchestrated Rise to Fall is the debut LP by The Album Leaf, released in 1999.

== Track listing ==
No.	Title	Length
1.	"Wander"	5:53
2.	"An Interview"	2:33
3.	"Lounge Act"	0:37
4.	"September Song"	2:43
5.	"We Once Were (One)"	4:29
6.	"This River Deep"	2:29
7.	"Airplane"	4:52
8.	"A Short Story"	19:37
9.	"We Once Were (Two)"	4:37
10.	"Lounge Act (Two)"	3:14
