= Spine and Sensory =

1999 studio album by Tristeza

Studio album by Tristeza
- Released: 1999
- Recorded: November 1998
- Genre: Post-rock
- Label: Makoto Recordings

Professional ratings
Review scores
Source	Rating
AllMusic	4/5 stars
Pitchfork Media	7.4/10

Spine and Sensory is an LP by Tristeza. It was recorded at Louder Studios in San Francisco, CA, and released in 1999 by Makoto Recordings. In 2004 the album was remastered and re-released with bonus tracks by Better Looking Records.

The cover art is a detail from "Plus Reversed," by Richard Anuszkiewicz (1960).

== Track listing ==
1. "Golden Hill" (4:53)
2. "Beige Finger" (4:49)
3. "RMS 2000" (5:00)
4. "When We Glow" (8:18)
5. "Memphis Emphasis" (3:25)
6. "Muerte en Tu Sueño" (2:54)
7. "Electrolytes" (3:06)
8. "The Marionette" (1:45)
9. "Cinematography" (5:27)
10. "A Little Distance" (5:52)
11. "Macrame" (6:02) [2004 re-release]
12. "Pink Elephants" (4:38) [2004 re-release]
13. "La Verdad" (5:42) [2004 re-release]
