= Against the Seasons: Cold Winter Songs from the Dead Summer Heat =

EP by Woods of Ypres
- Released: November 26, 2002
- Recorded: August 2002
- Studio: Spectre Sound Studios in Tecumseh, Ontario
- Genre: Melodic black metal, doom metal
- Length: 30:38
- Label: Krankenhaus, Night Birds
- Producer: Glenn Fricker

Woods of Ypres chronology
Against the Seasons: Cold Winter Songs from the Dead Summer Heat (2002)	Pursuit of the Sun & Allure of the Earth (2004)

Professional ratings
Review scores
Source	Rating
Sputnikmusic	4.5/5 stars

Against the Seasons: Cold Winter Songs from the Dead Summer Heat is the first studio release and only EP from the Canadian black metal/doom metal group Woods of Ypres. It was recorded in August, 2002 at Spectre Sound Studios in Tecumseh, Ontario. It is Woods of Ypres' only album featuring founding members Brian McManus and Aaron Palmer, and their only album on which David Gold does not contribute any vocals or guitar work.

This album was remastered by producer, and then-bassist, Dan Hulse in 2005 and re-released with new artwork that summer. A limited run of the album on cassette was also issued that year through Night Birds Records. The whole EP (save for "Awaiting the Inevitable") was later re-issued as part of Woods of Ypres' 2009 compilation CD Independent Nature 2002–2007. Each song on the album would remain a frequent addition in Woods of Ypres setlists to varying degrees since this EP was released.

== Track listing ==
All tracks are written by David Gold

No.	Title	Length
1.	"Intro: The Shams of Optimism"	3:01
2.	"Crossing the 45th Parallel"	6:47
3.	"The Sea of Immeasurable Loss"	7:07
4.	"A Meeting Place and Time"	8:47
5.	"Awaiting the Inevitable"	4:56
Total length:		30:38

== Personnel ==
- Brian McManus – guitar, harsh vocals
- Aaron Palmer – bass guitar, clean vocals
- David Gold – drums
