= In an Off White Room =

EP by The Album Leaf
- Released: 2001
- Genre: Post rock
- Label: Troubleman Unlimited

In an Off White Room is an EP by The Album Leaf, released on Troubleman Unlimited Records in 2001.

Exclaim! noted about the EP, "In An Off White Room feels like you are reminiscing about dreams from the night before."

== Track listing ==
1. "Project Loop"
2. "Glisten"
3. "Six AM"
4. "Off White Room"*
5. "Computer Love" (bonus track, by Kraftwerk)
- The track "Off White Room" is a recording of bird sounds which last about 23 minutes and after that the Kraftwerk song "Computer Love" plays.
