= Woods 5: Grey Skies & Electric Light =

Studio album by Woods of Ypres
- Released: February 13, 2012
- Recorded: August 2011
- Studios: Beach Road Studios in Goderich, Ontario
- Genres: Doom metal, gothic metal
- Length: 62:02
- Label: Earache Records
- Producer: Siegfried Meier

Woods of Ypres chronology
Woods IV: The Green Album (2009)	Woods 5: Grey Skies & Electric Light (2012)

Woods 5: Grey Skies & Electric Light is the fourth studio album as well as the fifth and final studio release from Woods of Ypres, released two months after the death of multi-instrumentalist and frontman David Gold. On February 19, 2013, it was announced that Woods 5 had been nominated for a Juno Award for "Metal/Hard Music Album of the Year", along with the likes of Devin Townsend, Cancer Bats, and Ex Deo, an award that it went on to win.

== Production and recording ==
It was recorded in August 2011 at Beach Road Studios with Siegfried Meier in Goderich, Ontario, and released the following year through Earache Records. In comparison to past Woods of Ypres albums, the album has a stronger emphasis on clean vocals and gothic metal sounds, with little of the black metal sound that was present on previous releases. Woods V is the band's only studio album (and second release overall) to feature guitarist Joel Violette, and the first Woods of Ypres album since Woods III to feature David Gold on studio drums. It also marked the band's final studio collaboration with cellist Raphael Weinroth-Browne and oboist Angela Schleihauf, who had both guested on Woods IV: The Green Album. It was the first album on which David Gold did not write the entirety of the songs, with him and Joel Violette splitting the duties, a process that Violette says Gold enjoyed greatly.

Gold posted on Twitter shortly before his death that the album had taken a great toll on him emotionally, stating,

"It's humbling to write something in strength and conviction, only later to fear what you've created because it hurts too much, is too close."

"And finally, nearly 10 years in, the art is finally too much, too real, too raw, too close, too loud, cold, clean, but too hard to hear."

and,

"#Wood5 is a dangerous record for how real it is and for how somewhere out there, those stories are unraveling in terrible ways in real life."

== Release ==
Originally slated for a January 30 release date, the final version of the album was released in the UK on February 13 and in the US in April 2012. Though not the band's first release on the label, Woods V marked the band's first and only album to be initially put out under the Earache Records umbrella.

=== Other versions ===
A link to an incomplete promotional version of the album was tweeted by Earache Records shortly after David Gold's death on December 21, 2011. This version of the album excluded "Keeper of the Ledger", split "Kiss My Ashes (Goodbye)" into two separate tracks, and had a different track order from the final release. The limited edition vinyl pressing of Woods V includes an exclusive producer's mix of "Finality" on the second disc, which is unavailable officially in other formats.

Also, a vinyl reissue has been announced by Earache Records, and it was released April 7, 2017.

== Reception ==
=== Critical response ===
Professional ratings
Review scores
Source	Rating
About.com	4.5/5 stars
Exclaim.ca	(positive)
Metal Hammer	6/7 stars

Response to the album was largely positive. About.com gave it a near perfect score of 4.5/5 stars, while Metal Hammer Germany gave it 6/7, praising lead singer Gold's vocals and lyrics.

=== Charts and awards ===
On February 19, 2013, it was announced that Woods 5 had been nominated for a Juno Award for "Metal/Hard Music Album of the Year," along with the likes of Devin Townsend, Cancer Bats and Ex Deo, an award that it went on to win.

Year	Award	Nominated work	Category	Result
2013	Juno Awards	Woods 5: Grey Skies & Electric Light	Metal/Hard Music; Album of the Year	Won

== Track listing ==
All lyrics written by David Gold.

No.	Title	Music	Length
1.	"Lightning & Snow"	David Gold	4:41
2.	"Death Is Not an Exit"	Joel Violette	5:10
3.	"Keeper of the Ledger"	Gold	6:05
4.	"Traveling Alone"	Violette	5:04
5.	"Adora Vivos"	Gold	5:42
6.	"Silver"	Violette	4:49
7.	"Career Suicide (Is Not Real Suicide)"	Violette	3:44
8.	"Modern Life Architecture"	Gold	7:21
9.	"Kiss My Ashes (Goodbye)"	Gold	10:53
10.	"Finality"	Violette	3:55
11.	"Alternate Ending"	Violette	4:28
Total length:			62:02

== Personnel ==
Woods of Ypres

- David Gold - vocals, guitars, drums
- Joel Violette - lead guitars, bass, piano

Additional personnel

- Angela Schleihauf - oboe
- Raphael Weinroth-Browne - cello
