= GoGoGo Airheart =

- Origin: San Diego, California, United States
- Genres: Indie rock
- Years active: 1996–2006
- Labels: Gold Standard Laboratories
- Members: Mike Vermillion; Ashish Vyas; Ben White; Andy Robillard

GoGoGo Airheart was a post-punk band from San Diego, California, that was active from 1996 to 2006.

== Career ==
The band started out by local independent label, Vinyl Communications, and released their self-titled debut in 1997. By that time drummer Andy Robillard and violinist Teri Hoefer joined the group. In 1998 the band released their second album, love my life...hate my friends, which increased their popularity in the local music scene. They followed up with their 1999 release, Things we Need (EP), on the Touch & Go subsidiary Overcoat Recordings.

In 1999 the band also underwent personnel changes. Jimmy LaValle temporarily replaced Robillard on drums, while Hoefer left the band permanently, to start a band with her fiance Chris Relyea, formerly of The Rapture. Ben White assumed the lead guitar role. By the turn of the century, the band went on various national tours, and brought in drummer Jay Hough in place of Lavalle.

By this time, GoGoGo Airheart had switched to the Sonny Kay and Mars Volta co-owned record label, GSL, and the band issued their third album, Out Every Window The Snap Of Envy And Greed, in 2000. In 2001 the band toured the states and worked on their next album, ExitheUXA, which was released in June 2002. GoGoGo Airheart also embarked on a national tour in 2002, and later in the year a European tour, supported by fellow indie rock artists such as Franz Ferdinand and The Futureheads, followed by another national tour on their way back to California.

In 2003 White left the band, and Robillard was invited back to double-drum with Jay, who ended up parting ways with the band in July 2003, thus stripping the band down to a three-piece. In 2004 the band recorded demos of new material with Rocket From The Crypt/Pitchfork/Drive Like Jehu founder John Reis, but material from these sessions has yet to be released.

By 2005, Ben White was back in the band, and the group released their final album, Rats! Sing! Sing!, which followed both national and international tours. In early 2006, the band decided to call quits. Their final show was played at The Casbah on May 22. On one of their blog sites, Andy Robillard told fans, "After almost ten years of doing GGGAH we just can't keep living on the cheap ... I'm a little sad but also relieved that the band is done, end of an era and all that, but at least I can say without any reservations whatsoever that we never put out a shitty record, and we never sold out to The Man."

== Band members ==
- Mike Vermillion
- Ashish Vyas
- Ben White
- Andy Robillard
- Teri Hoefer
- Michael Henning
- Jimi Hey
- Jimmy LaValle
- Jay Hough
- M Frederick "Dekes"
- Carlos De La Garza

== Discography ==
=== Albums ===
- GoGoGo Airheart (1997 - Vinyl Communications)
- Love My Life... Hate My Friends (1998 - Vinyl Communications)
- Out Every Window the Snap of Envy & Greed (2000)
- ExitheUXA (2002 - Gold Standard Laboratories)
- GoGoGo Airheart re-release (2003 - Gold Standard Laboratories)
- Love My Life... Hate My Friends re-release (2003 - Gold Standard Laboratories)
- Rats! Sing! Sing! (2005 - Gold Standard Laboratories)

=== Singles and EPs ===
- "Judgement" (1997)
- "Things We Need EP" (1999 - Overcoat Recordings)
- "Song for Video" (1999)
- "The Beauty of Appetite" + "Teri and Julie" (split LP with Syncopation)
- Split CD with the 90 Day Men (2000)
- "Real Live Kill" (2002)
