= Green Tour EP =

Extended play

EP by The Album Leaf
- Released: 2007
- Recorded: Spring 2007
- Genre: Electronic
- Label: Self-released
- Producer: Jimmy LaValle

Professional ratings
Review scores
Source	Rating
AbsolutePunk.net	(86/100)

Green Tour EP was a tour-only EP release by The Album Leaf, available at the band's live shows since 2007. In addition to its six tracks, it also contains a video for "We Need Help" shot on tour.

== Track listing ==
1. We Need Help
2. Fear of Flying
3. Drawing Mountains
4. Enchanted Hill
5. Kevlar
6. San Simeon
