= Woods IV: The Green Album =

Woods 4: The Green Album

Studio album by Woods of Ypres
- Released: November 13, 2009
- Recorded: June–July 2009, Stereo Soul Studios, Sault Ste. Marie, Ontario
- Genres: Doom metal, gothic metal, neofolk
- Length: 78:26
- Labels: Practical Art, Earache
- Producers: Miguel Gauthier, David Gold

Woods of Ypres chronology
| Independent Nature 2002–2007 (2009) | Woods 4: The Green Album (2009) | Woods 5: Grey Skies & Electric Light (2012) |

Professional ratings
Review scores
| Source | Rating |
|---|---|
| About.com | 4/5 stars |
| AllMusic | 4/5 stars |
| Terrorizer | 6/10 |

Woods 4: The Green Album is the third full-length album and fourth studio release by Canadian blackened doom metal band Woods of Ypres. It is the band's only release to feature guitarist Bryan Belleau, the only full album to feature Evan and Shane Madden on bass and drums, and the only full-length Woods of Ypres release to not feature frontman David Gold on drums. It is the band's only full-length album to be released on Gold's final independent label Practical Art Records, and its March 2011 reissue through Earache Records marked their debut on that label as well. A music video (the band's last) was released for the song "I Was Buried in Mount Pleasant Cemetery". A limited run of 1,000 copies of Woods IV also included a bonus album: Slaughter of the Seoul, the final album by South Korean death metal band Necramyth, who Gold drummed for at the time.

== Track listing ==
| No. | Title | Length |
|---|---|---|
| 1. | "Shards of Love" | 5:19 |
| 2. | "Everything I Touch Turns to Gold (Then to Coal)" | 5:03 |
| 3. | "By the Time You Read This (I Will Already Be Dead)" | 6:30 |
| 4. | "I Was Buried in Mount Pleasant Cemetery" | 7:58 |
| 5. | "Dirty Window of Opportunity: "Can You Get Here in 10 Days?"" | 5:14 |
| 6. | "...And I Am Pining (For You)" | 8:15 |
| 7. | "Wet Leather" | 4:30 |
| 8. | "Suicide Cargoload (Drag That Weight)" | 4:04 |
| 9. | "Halves and Quarters" | 2:25 |
| 10. | "You Are Here with Me (In This Sequence of Dreams)" | 1:41 |
| 11. | "Retrosleep in the Morning Calm" | 3:25 |
| 12. | "Don't Open the Wounds/Skywide Arm Spread" | 4:58 |
| 13. | "Natural Technologies" | 4:54 |
| 14. | "Mirror Reflection & the Hammer Reinvention" | 7:03 |
| 15. | "To Long Life in the 'Limbo Union'" | 4:08 |
| 16. | "Move On! (The Woman Will Always Leave the Man)" | 2:59 |
| Total length: | | 78:26 |

Limited edition bonus disc: Necramyth – Slaughter of the Seoul
| No. | Title | Length |
|---|---|---|
| 1. | "The Mandala with Thousand Arms" | 2:42 |
| 2. | "Rotten Truth" | 4:23 |
| 3. | "Behind the Mask of Sin" | 4:48 |
| 4. | "Man's Fate" | 4:30 |
| 5. | "444 Pagan Ways to..." | 5:36 |
| 6. | "Nymphonic Queen of Blood" | 5:59 |
| 7. | "VI Heaven III Calyx IV Anthem" | 1:29 |
| 8. | "Painless Civilization" | 4:15 |
| 9. | "Ravenouz Ritual" | 4:44 |
| 10. | "Daunt" | 10:45 |
| Total length: | | 49:11 |

== Personnel ==
Woods of Ypres

- David Gold – vocals, guitars, piano
- Bryan Belleau – lead guitars
- Shane Madden – bass
- Evan Madden – drums

Additional personnel

- Nathanael Larochette – guitar on "You Are Here With Me (In This Sequence Of Dreams)"
- Raphael Weinroth-Browne – cello on "You Are Here With Me (In This Sequence Of Dreams)"
- Angela Schleihauf – oboe on "Shards of Love," "I Was Buried in Mount Pleasant Cemetery" and "You Are Here With Me (In This Sequence Of Dreams)"

=== Slaughter of the Seoul ===
Necramyth

- Pedro "Urlok" Chae – vocals, guitar
- Herlock – guitar
- Johan – bass
- David "Veillko" Gold – drums

Additional personnel

- Hyo Jin – backing vocals on "Nymphonic Queen of Blood"
- Hyoun Jeong Kim – backing vocals on "Nymphonic Queen of Blood"
- Jae Ho – backing vocals on "Nymphonic Queen of Blood"

== Sources ==
- Woods 4: The Green Album
