= Better Looking Records =

US record label

- Founded: 1999
- Country of origin: United States

Better Looking Records is a record label with offices in Los Angeles and San Diego. Founded in 1999, Paul Fischer, who DJ'd at KXLU college radio station in Los Angeles and worked at crank! Records, partnered with Dave Brown who ran Holiday Matinee Publicity and Muddle fanzine. The label grew with each release and is now a part of the EastWest Records/ADA family of labels.

== Artists ==
- Aberdeen
- Boilermaker
- Cursive
- Eastern Youth
- The Electric Soft Parade
- Ryan Ferguson
- Goldrush
- Ides of Space
- Maquiladora
- Meho Plaza
- Morning Recordings
- No Knife
- Ravens & Chimes
- Reubens Accomplice
- The Album Leaf
- The And/Ors
- The Good Life
- The Jealous Sound
- Track Star
- Tristeza
- The Traditionist

== See also ==
- List of record labels
