= Lehavoth =

- Origin: Haifa, Israel
- Genres: Melodic black metal, death metal
- Years active: 1995–2005; 2014–current
- Labels: Fadeless, The Spew
- Members: Yuval Talmor; Gal Cohen; Saar Tuvi; Elad Manor; Nate Gould
- Past members: Ariel "Conan" Ron; Assaf Enav; Evil Haim; Nir Guitraiman; Nir Doliner
- Website: Official site

Lehavoth is an Israeli death metal band. In its early years, the band was a pioneering band in the Israeli black metal scene.

== History ==
The band was formed in 1995 by vocalist Yuval Talmor (better known as Molech) and guitarist Gal Cohen (better known as Pixel) as a melodic black metal band, thus being one of the first black metal bands in Israel. The two, together with Moshe Kahana (guitar), Assaf Rinot (bass) and Uri Hadar (drums), recorded a demo titled Brith Ha'Orvim which was self-released in 1996, before the band took a hiatus due to the band members' enlistment in the army.

In 2000, the band was revived by the two original members, who were joined by guitarist Assaf Enav, bassist Evil Haim and drummer Nir Doliner. This time, the band shifted style from melodic black metal to brutal death metal. With this line-up, the band recorded their first demo as a full band (and with a drummer), and their first as a brutal death metal band. The demo, entitled Iconoclastic and recorded with an eight-track, was self-released in 2001. Shortly after, guitarist Assaf Enav left the band and was replaced with Salem guitarist Nir Gutraiman.

In February 2002, the band flew to Sweden to Soundlab Studios to record their debut full-length album Hatred Shaped Man, with producer Mieszko Talarczyk of Nasum. Shortly after finishing the album, the band was signed by Dutch label Fadeless Records, and the album was finally released in April 2003. Following the release of the album, the band performed a series of shows in Europe, primarily in Germany, including Fuck the Commerce Festival in Neiden. The same year, drummer Nir Doliner joined Belgian deathgrind band Leng Tch'e as guitarist for the band's festival tour in Europe.

In 2004, the band recorded four new songs for release on an upcoming EP, but due to vocalist Yuval Talmor's departure later that year, the band released the four songs on the split album The Sick, The Dead, The Rotten with American bands Suture and Leukorrhea. Talmor was replaced with Whorecore vocalist Ariel Ron (better known as Conan) and performed with the band as that year's Metalist Festival alongside bands such as Behemoth, Betzefer, Orphaned Land, Matricide, Salem and more.

In 2005, the band performed at that year's Metalist Festival, alongside Megadeth, Destruction, Eternal Gray, Distorted, Crossfire and more. The band's performance at the festival was its last before band members split to focus on their own projects. An official break-up statement was never released from any of the band members.

In 2014, "Pixel and Molech [bring] the band back to life with a new lineup," according to the band's Facebook page. In 2016, the band released a new album "Grinder."

== Musical style and influences ==
The band began as a melodic black metal band, taking influences from various bands from Norwegian second wave black metal scene of the 1990s, as well as bands from the melodic and symphonic black metal scenes. Though, the band's only release as such a band was the 1996 demo tape Brit Ha'Orvim, before the band changed style in 2000.

The band's first EP Iconoclastic, which was released in 2001, marked a change in the band's style to brutal death metal with influences from various genres of extreme metal music such death metal, black metal, grindcore and hardcore punk, with strong influences such as Aborted, Dying Fetus, Cannibal Corpse, Napalm Death and more.

== Band members ==
=== Final line-up ===
- Yuval Talmor - lead vocals (1995–2004, 2014–present)
- Gal Cohen - guitar (1995–2005, 2014–present)
- Saar Tuvi - guitar (2016–present)
- Elad Manor - bass (2016–present)
- Nate Gould - drums (2016–present)

=== Former members ===
- Ariel "Conan" Ron - lead vocals (2004–2005)
- Nir Gutraiman - guitar (2001–2005)
- Evil Haim - bass (2000–2005)
- Nir Doliner - drums, percussion (2000–2005)
- Assaf Enav - guitar (2000–2001)

== Discography ==
=== Albums ===
- 1996 - Brit Ha'Orvim (demo)
- 2001 - Iconoclastic (demo)
- 2003 - Hatred Shaped Man (full-length, Fadeless Records)
- 2003 - The Sick, The Dead, The Rotten (split with Suture and Leukorrhea, The Spew Records)
- 2016 - Grinder (EP)
