= Nakav =

Nakav (Hebrew: נקב) is a surname. Notable people with the surname include:

- Nir Nakav, Israeli drummer
- Shahar Nakav (born 2007), Israeli footballer
