= Amona =

Amona may refer to:

== Places ==
- Amona, Goa, a village in Goa, India
- Amona, Mateh Binyamin, an Israeli outpost in the central West Bank
- Isla de Mona, known in the pre-Columbian era as Amona

== Other ==
- "Amona", a song on the album Necessary Evil by Israeli band Salem
- Asteia amona, an Asteiidae species of fly
