= Oi Va Voi =

British band

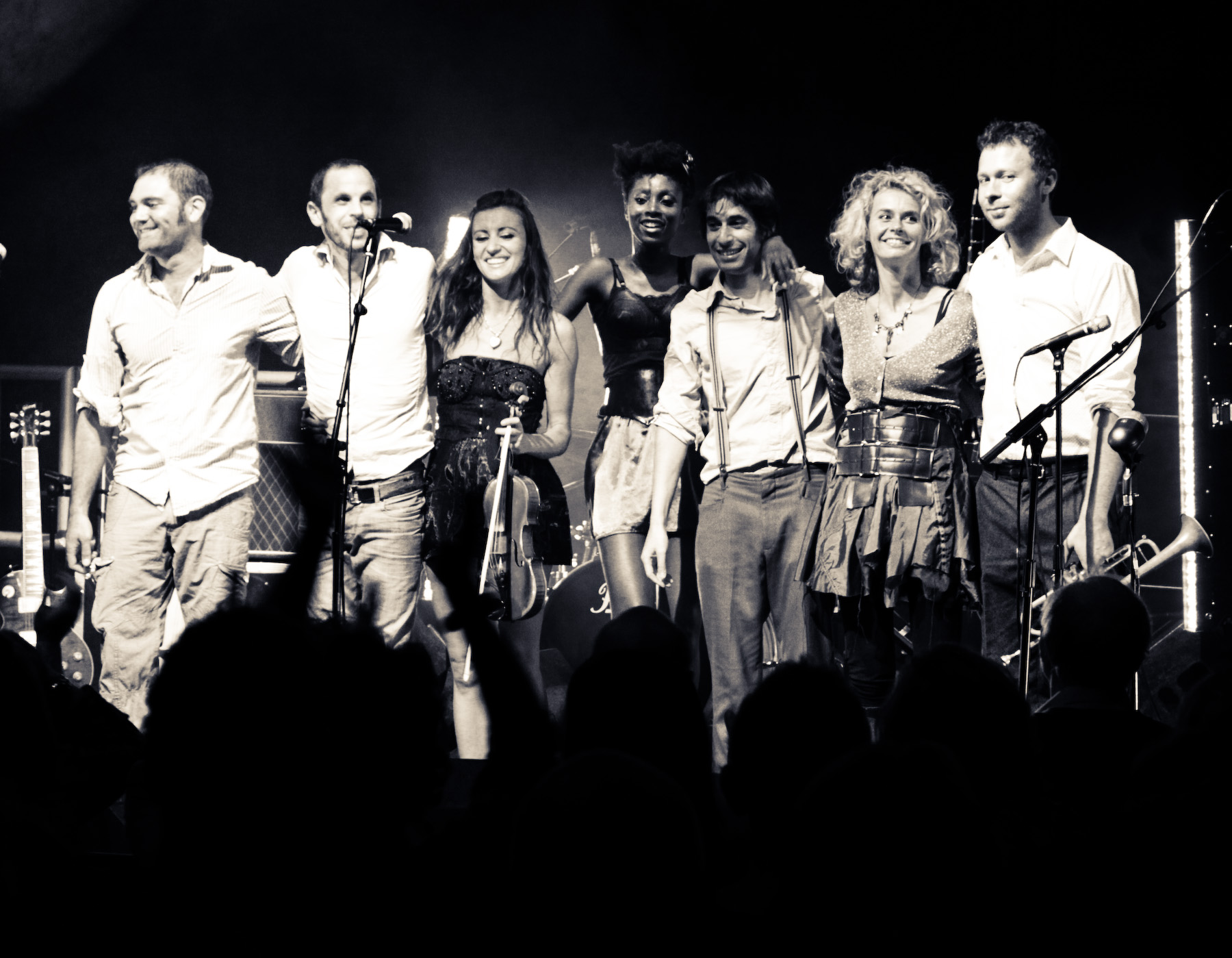

Background information
- Origin: London, England
- Genres: Klezmer; dance
- Years active: 2000–present
- Label: V2 Benelux // OI VA VOI Recordings
- Members: Steve Levi; Josh Breslaw; David Orchant; Michael Vinaver; Anna Phoebe; Moshik Kop; John Matts; Beth Leondaritis; Zohara Niddam
- Past members: Nik Ammar; Sophie Solomon; Lemez Lovas; Leo Bryant; Josephine Burton
- Website: www.oi-va-voi.com

Oi Va Voi are a British band formed in London, England in the year 2000. The band emerged from the UK world music crossover scene, enabling Jewish musicians to bring cultural styles into contemporary songwriting. The band blended their heritage with an emphasis on modern pop sensibilities reflecting their own individual interests in indie rock and alt-folk and the urban dance music of the clubs of London. The band takes its name from a Yiddish-derived exclamation popular in modern Hebrew meaning, approximately, "Oh, my gosh!".

== Origins ==
The band started in the cities of Oxford and London, when Jonathan Walton a.k.a. Lemez Lovas met Josephine Burton. The earliest line-up had Josephine as the singer and Jonathan on trumpet who in turn knew violinist Sophie Solomon. Both of them knew bassist Leo Bryant, clarinetist Steve Levi who had been studying at Oxford Brookes and guitarist Jake Baum. This early line-up had about 4-5 gigs in Autumn 1998 in Oxford and then a gig in London in January 1999. A second guitarist Nik Ammar joined through mutual connections and then Jonathan met drummer Josh Breslaw. After university the band all moved to London and carried on playing together with a regular spot at an Albanian Bar called KOHA. Within a year this core line up started to solidify and the band found a young Jewish urban arts scene in London to grow into.

== History ==
=== Early years (1999–2001) ===
The London scene of the late nineties was a melting pot of world music genres and scenes that were beginning to coalesce around dance music, propelled and facilitated in part by the early days of the internet and to a great extent by the efforts of DJs and broadcasters such as Charlie Gillett and Gilles Peterson. In the early days of the internet it was radio shows such as The Sound of the World and WorldWide that typified the outward looking perspective of the UK music scene of that time.

JMI booked the band to play at the Southbank Centre in Autumn of 1999 to which conversations followed between the Jewish Music Institute and Oi Va Voi, where guidance, mentoring and financial assistance were given. The outcome was twofold, firstly YADARTS was created by Josephine and Jonathan to be an agency and hub for young Jewish music and arts to which they launched to a series on sell out concerts at Union Chapel. Secondly, JMI saw the potential in the band and had confidence in their ambition and so sponsored the members of the group to go out to KlezKamp Philadelphia where the band learned Klezmer from masters like Frank London of The Klezmatics. Josh recalled in interview,

"I was aware of the sound but never sat inside the music from the drummers stool, it was like BAM! I felt attached to it but no matter I never got the sense I had to play according to a set rhythm rather that I complimented and played drums and bass beats and other rhythms into it."

The direction took to mix Klezmer and Jewish roots music with House, Drum and Bass, Dubstep and Hip Hop.

The line-up found an audience amongst regular performances at The Spitz in East London which is where they found a crowd keen to hear more and it wasn't long before a following started to take shape. With a London following and a fresh new sound, heads started to turn and it wasn't long before shows in LA, Moscow and Washington followed. Former singer Josephine Burton left the band and went to set up the agency Yad Arts together with BBC DJ Max Reinhardt. Yad Arts arranged collaborations for the band, leading to a cross-cultural venture with Moroccan band Momo on a project called Roots & Harmony. The North African musical collaborations continued and they soon collaborated with the French Algerian pianist Maurice El Medioni of El Gusto.

Digital Folklore

=== Digital Folklore (2001–2003) ===
Wanting to capture and record the music that the band had been developing, the band set out to record a self-funded debut. With recording and CD production costs still being high at this moment in time, the band were mentored by record producer, musician and WOMEX founder Ben Mandelson. The band applied to the Jewish Music Institute's Millennium Award Fund and received a grant to record and produce their first album, which was recorded at Livingstone Studio Wood Green and produced and engineered by Josh Breslaw and Lemez Lovas. "Digital Folklore". Some of the tracks on the album were later abridged and re-recorded for Laughter Through Tears, one example is the Hungarian folk song "A csitári hegyek alatt" whose vocals were performed by a female singer on the new album. The response to the album served to not only galvanise their following around the new release but was also nominated for a BBC World Music Award, went on to see them perform a showcase at Womex in Essen and then sign to Outcaste Records.

=== Laughter Through Tears (2003–2005) ===
Laughter Through Tears was the band's second album.

The band played at world music festivals, rock festivals, solidly touring Germany, Czech Republic, Slovakia, Slovenia and Poland.

The band, still self-managing whilst on tour, got a song from digital folklore called "7 Brothers" licensed to Outcaste for a compilation called "Future of Flamenco" which was compiled by the band's future A&R person, Martin Morales. Martin subsequently signed to the band. The label offered the band mentoring to help the creative process reach a wider audience. The label focused on assisting the band with songwriting and draughted in singers to help strengthen the sound. Outcaste (label under artistic directorship of British composer Nitin Sawnhey which was an imprint of Relentless to which KT was a signed artist) brought in singer KT Tunstall and suggested that the band write songs for her. The label brought in producers Grammy Award, Bacon and Quarmby to produce the album.

Some of the tracks on the album were originally on the band's debut, Digital Folklore, one example is the Hungarian folk song "A Csitári" whose vocals were performed by a male singer in the older album, and by Judit Németh in Laughter Through Tears. The album includes a remix of "7 Brothers" as a hidden track, it is found after the 3 minutes and 7 seconds of silence after "Pagamenska". Having signed to Outcaste Records.

The band recorded the album in the studio and had additional production from Moshik Kop and Toni Economedes (Da Lata) plus guest singers - Judit Nemeth, Earl Zinger, Lenny Breslaw (Drummer's father) and Mayer Bogdanski. The album had a strong urban production which was also complemented by numerous remixes which included Hefner and Matthew Herbert Big Band accompanying its release.

The band released the album came out in October 2003 with launch show at Bush Hall, followed by an extensive European tour in February 2004. So buoyant was the band that on returning to the UK they did a follow-up tour May 2004. This in turn carried on into the summer festival circuit, including Glastonbury, Cambridge Folk Festival, Big Chill, Larmer Tree, a whole host of others. After the UK, the band then returned to Europe to switch from venues to festivals for the entire summer of 2004 which saw them break into some of the larger festivals such as Exit Novi Sad, Sziget.

After the album release and a year of touring the band returned to London, KT Tunstall finished her role within the band and went to do her solo album, Eye to the Telescope which was released by Relentless later in 2004 to huge acclaim.

The band then set about auditioning new singers to replace Tunstall and started working on a new record. Sophie Solomon started to write for a solo project. Nick Mander went from managing elements of the band's interests and to stepping in as their manager. The band won the Edison Award in Holland. The band left Outcaste records in 2005 and went to sign with V2 Records and began to work on their second official release.

=== OI VA VOI (2006–2008) ===
The band was going through a period of flux. With KT Tunstall having left to work on her own career, Sophie Solomon also left to pursue a solo career that culminated in the release of her album Poison Sweet Madeira. Lemez Lovas took a sabbatical from the band due to his health but carried on working on song writing and composition.

The band worked with singer Alice McGlaughlin and producer Mike Spencer at Miloco Studios in London and Zaza Studio in Tel Aviv, Israel. With songs like Yuri, Dissident, Balkani and Spirit of Bulgaria, the strong post-soviet themes ran through the album as the band embraced the emerging post-soviet Eastern European music scene that was steadily reaching a mainstream audience in the UK and Central Europe. In London the scene established around the Spitz moved from East to West. The band were a pivotal part of the Radio Gagarin club night, Notting Hill Arts Club which was set up by Josephine Burton and Max Reinhardt and on the first night the band headlined a billing with US/Israel band Balkan Beat Box.

The pan-European fanbase was established and expanding weekly with the live bookings flooding in. Leo Bryant left to pursue other interests but remained part of the set up and occasionally performed with the band. Lemez Lovas left the band to pursue other interests and projects such as Shtetl Superstars and Yiddish Twist Orchestra. With bookings flooding in, the band embarked on a solid touring programme for two whole years across Europe. Singer Bridget Amofah (currently of Rudimental) joined the band, as well as Lucy Shaw on Bass, Anna Phoebe on Violin and David Orchant on Trumpet. During the middle of this schedule the band played Glastonbury's Avalon Stage in 2007. Over the next two years the band developed a strong performing presence and it was in this period of the burgeoning East European and Balkan music scene that Oi Va Voi found a huge popularity across the Eastern Europe and with that Turkey opened up to them. The Turkish audience found a deep connection in the band's sound with its mix of Eastern European, Balkan, Jewish and Middle Eastern modes and rhythms fused with metropolitan urban dance music and solid songwriting all contributed to them having week long residencies at Istanbul's Babylon Club, regional radio airplay, extensive regional touring and festival headline appearances sometimes touring twice within the same year. Whilst on the road, the band started writing new material and on returning to the UK, the band's relationship with V2 UK records changed as the label was cutting back on its roster of artists due to mergers and global restructuring. The band finished the two years of touring and began recording their next album with producers Bacon and Quarmby.

=== Travelling The Face Of The Globe (2009–2012) ===
Travelling the Face of the Globe is the fourth studio album released by London, England based band Oi Va Voi. The first single of the album is "Every Time". The album produced by Bacon & Quarmby and RAK Studio. The band's line up was cemented from the two years on the road together and the material was a product of both their experiences of touring, hence the album title and the synergy of the musicianship of the line-up. Lead guest singer Bridget Amofah made her first recording debut for the band and the album also featured other guest singers; the French singer Dick Rivers (Photograph) and Hungarian singer Agi Szaloki (S'brent and Wonder). The album marked a critical return with The Guardian exclaiming "Astonishing. On several counts" and the Independent stating that "This London band's third album is undoubtedly their most focused and consistently engaging." The band then performed a sold-out concert in London as part of a series of concerts at West London Synagogue (that also featured Regina Spektor). Following that debut show the band embarked on a successful UK and European Tour that culminated in a sold-out concert at Shepherds Bush Empire. Following that tour, Nik Ammar left to pursue other interests and was replaced by Michael Winawer.

=== Live band and writing sessions (2012–2016) ===
OI VA VOI continued performing live in Europe and Turkey throughout this period.

=== Memory Drop (2016–present) ===
In 2015 the band began writing their new album. A core writing team consisting of founding members Josh Breslaw and Steve Levi along with longtime band members David Orchant and Michael Vinavar developed all of the music with Steve Levi writing most of the lyrics. Towards the end of the writing process new singer Zohara Niddam began collaborating and co-wrote on 4 of the 6 songs she performed on.

In 2017 OI VA VOI recorded Memory Drop, their 5th studio album. Musicians performing on the album include: Steve Levi (Clarinet and Vocals), Josh Breslaw (Drums), David Orchant (Trumpet and Piano), Michael Vinaver (Guitar and Bass), Anna Phoebe (Violin), John Matts (Guitar and Bass), Zohara Niddam (Vocals, Piano, Keys), Georgina Leach (violin). The album was produced by OI VA VOI drummer Josh Breslaw and mixed by Moshik Kop. Memory Drop was released on 9 November 2018 via V2 Records Benelux.

In November 2025, the Strange Brew venue in Bristol apologised to the band for cancelling a performance that was due to take place in May after receiving complaints from activist groups. They accepted that the scrutiny was only "because they are a Jewish band performing with an Israeli singer" and the cancellation was not in accordance with the Equality Act 2010. The venue stated that it had implemented compulsory antisemitism training for senior management and had made a donation to the Community Security Trust.

== Personnel ==
=== Current band members ===
- Steve Levi (clarinet, vocals)
- Josh Breslaw (drums, percussion, production)
- David Orchant (trumpet)
- Michael Vinaver (guitars, vocals)
- Anna Phoebe (violin)
- Moshik Kop (drums)
- John Matts (guitar, vocals)
- Elizabeth Leondaritis (bass, vocals)
- Zohara Niddam (vocals)
- Kalliopi Mitropoulou (violin, vocals)

=== Former band members ===
- Nik Ammar (guitar, vocals, mandolin, charango, strumstick, percussion, lyricist, songwriter), left in 2012 to focus on his career writing music for TV, film and games.
- Sophie Solomon (violin, viola, piano, accordion, melodica), a founding member of the band who left in 2006 to launch her solo career.
- Lemez Lovas (trumpet, vocals, piano, songwriting, lyrics), songwriter and lyricist, a founding member of the band who left in 2007.
- Leo Bryant (bass guitar, double bass)
- Bridgette Amofah (Vocals), sang on the group's fourth album, Travelling the Face of the Globe (2009)

== Associated acts ==
- Anna Phoebe
- Earl Zinger (a.k.a. Rob Gallagher) of Galliano featured on the Laughter Through Tears album
- KT Tunstall, though never an official member of the band, featured on the Laughter Through Tears album and was a regular member of the live set-up. Her solo career then took off towards the end of 2004.
- Uzbek musician Sevara Nazarkhan featured on the Laughter Through Tears album

== Discography ==
=== Albums ===
- Digital Folklore (2002)
- Laughter Through Tears (2003)
- Oi Va Voi (2007)
- Travelling the Face of the Globe (2009)
- Memory Drop (2018)
- The Water's Edge (2025)

=== Singles ===
- "7 Brothers" (2003)
- "Refugee" (2004)
- "Yesterday's Mistakes" (2004)
- "Yuri" (2007)
- "Every Time" (2009)
- "Big Brother" (2018)
- "Vanished World" (2018)

== Awards ==
- Oi Va Voi won an Edison award for Album of the Year 2004 Netherlands
- Oi Va Voi was nominated for the BBC Awards for World Music 2003 in the Boundary Crossing category.

== See also ==
- Jewish music
- Klezmer
