= Necessary Evil =

Necessary Evil may refer to:

== Ethics ==
- Necessary evil, an evil that must be allowed for a greater good to result
- Lesser of two evils principle

== Film and television ==
- The Necessary Evil, a 1925 American silent film
- Necessary Evil (2008 film), an American thriller film
- Necessary Evil: Super-Villains of DC Comics, a 2013 documentary film
- "Necessary Evil" (Star Trek: Deep Space Nine), a television episode
- "A Necessary Evil" (In the Heat of the Night), a television episode
- "A Necessary Evil" (Xena: Warrior Princess), a television episode

== Music ==
=== Albums ===
- Necessary Evil (Deborah Harry album) or the title song, 2007
- Necessary Evil (Salem album), 2007

=== Songs ===
- "Necessary Evil", by Armand Van Helden from 2 Future 4 U
- "Necessary Evil", by Balance of Power from Heathen Machine
- "Necessary Evil", by Body Count from Born Dead
- "Necessary Evil", by the Dresden Dolls from Yes, Virginia...
- "Necessary Evil", by Hans Zimmer from The Dark Knight Rises film soundtrack
- "Necessary Evil", by Memphis May Fire from Shapeshifter
- "Necessary Evil", by Motionless in White from Graveyard Shift
- "Necessary Evil", by Napalm Death from Enemy of the Music Business
- "Necessary Evil", by Nikki Yanofsky from Little Secret
- "Necessary Evil", by Unknown Mortal Orchestra from Multi-Love

== Other uses ==
- Necessary Evil (aircraft), a B-29 Superfortress used in the 1945 atomic bomb attack on Hiroshima
- Necessary Evil (comics), a 2019–2020 Power Rangers crossover event
- Necessary Evil, a role-playing game campaign setting by Savage Worlds
- Necessary Evil, a comic published by Desperado Publishing
- A Necessary Evil, a Stargate audiobook
- A Necessary Evil, novel by Abir Mukherjee
