= Anna Phoebe =

London-based musical artist (born 1981)

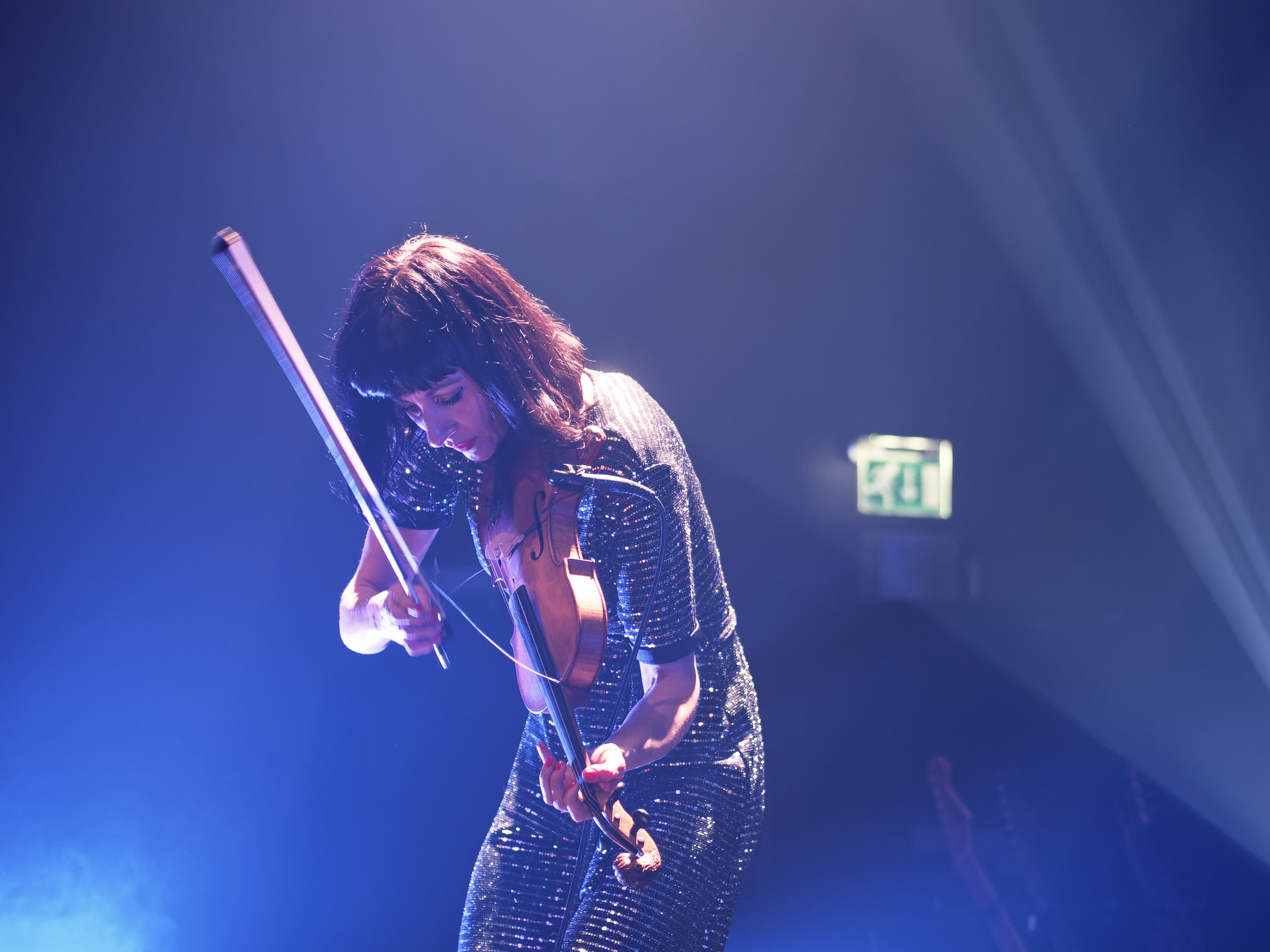
- Phoebe with Oi Va Voi in Utrecht in 2019
- Born: Anna Phoebe McElligott; 18 February 1981 (age 45); Hamburg, West Germany
- Education: London School of Economics
- Spouse: Gavin Esler (m. 2012)
- Children: 2
- Musical career
- Genres: classical rock; rock; folk rock; jazz rock; Celtic rock; Middle Eastern
- Instruments: Violin; keyboards
- Years active: 2001–present
- Formerly of: Trans-Siberian Orchestra
- Website: www.annaphoebe.com

Anna Phoebe McElligott (born 18 February 1981) is a London-based violinist, composer, and broadcaster who performs in musical genres including contemporary classical, rock, folk, jazz, Celtic, and Middle Eastern music.

== Early life and education ==
Anna Phoebe was born in Hamburg, West Germany, to a Greek-Irish historian father and a German children's social worker mother. A native German speaker, she learnt English upon moving to Manchester, England at the age of four. After a period living in Michigan in the United States, Phoebe and her family settled in St Andrews, Scotland.

Phoebe began playing the violin at the age of seven, encouraged by her mother, who is also a violinist. She read social policy and government at the London School of Economics. Around the time of her studies, she also worked with some Labour Party politicians.

== As performer ==
Having continued to play the violin throughout university, after graduating Phoebe devoted herself to music, working as a session musician for producers, bands, and singers in a variety of genres.

A breakthrough in Phoebe's career came in 2003 when she successfully auditioned to become a member of the Trans-Siberian Orchestra (TSO). She joined the TSO West Coast Band in 2004 and was invited back for the 2005–07 seasons, making her the first string director and soloist to return for a fourth year running. She toured in 2008 as part of the band, including three-month tours each Christmas through 26 states of western and central USA. She performed nearly 70 dates in arenas to audiences of up to 15,000 people; venues included the American Airlines Center in Dallas, the Save Mart Center in Fresno, HSBC Arena in Buffalo, New York, and the Orleans Arena in Las Vegas. Phoebe decided to move on from TSO in August 2010, stating: "I feel that I have taken my role as TSO violinist as far as it can go and it is time for me to hand the bow to someone else."

As a session artist, Phoebe has been hired by musicians including Sean "P Diddy" Combs, Robin Gibb, Ronan Keating, Liberty X, George Michael, and LeAnn Rimes. She has appeared on various television shows, including Top of the Pops, The Michael Parkinson Show, MTV and GMTV; as well as at music festivals, including Glastonbury and The Big Chill.

Phoebe was a guest star in 2007's "Jethro Tull World Tour", after an approach by Ian Anderson, and appeared on several occasions in later years with Anderson and his band. In 2012, she participated in their "Thick As A Brick" 1&2 tour, jamming on-screen nightly with Anderson remotely via Skype.

She toured with Jon Lord as his violinist, with performances in Russia and Sicily, and after his death took part in the tribute Sunflower Jam which was held at London's Royal Albert Hall in July 2011.

Phoebe appeared on the Sky Arts show Tony Visconti's Unsigned Heroes in 2017.

By November 2026, she was cast in the play The Popinjay Cavalier, directed by Quentin Tarantino.

== As composer ==
Phoebe's debut solo rock violin Gypsy Albumette was co-written with TSO rock guitarist, Angus Clark. She released her second solo album on iTunes, titled Rise of the Warrior.

In 2019, Phoebe formed the duo AVAWAVES with Berlin-based composer, producer and pianist Aisling Brouwer. Their debut album Waves was released in 2019 and followed by Chrysalis in 2021.

== Personal life ==
Phoebe is married to former BBC news presenter Gavin Esler, his second wife. They have two children.

== Discography ==
=== Solo ===
- Gypsy (2006)
- Rise of the Warrior (2008)
- Embrace EP (2013)
- Between The Shadow and the Soul (2014)
- Sea Souls (2021)

=== Trans-Siberian Orchestra ===
- Night Castle (2009)

=== Oi Va Voi ===
- Oi Va Voi (2007)
- Travelling the Face of the Globe (2009)

=== AVAWAVES ===
- Waves (2019)
- Chrysalis (2021)
