= Abraham Neumann =

Polish painter and artist

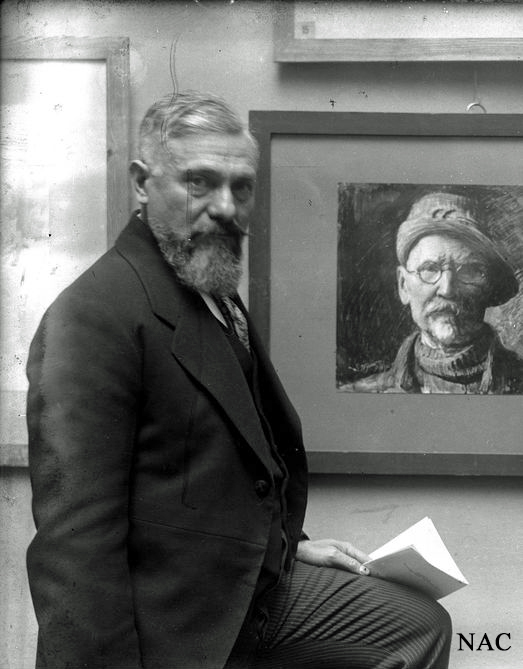
Abraham Neumann, before 1939

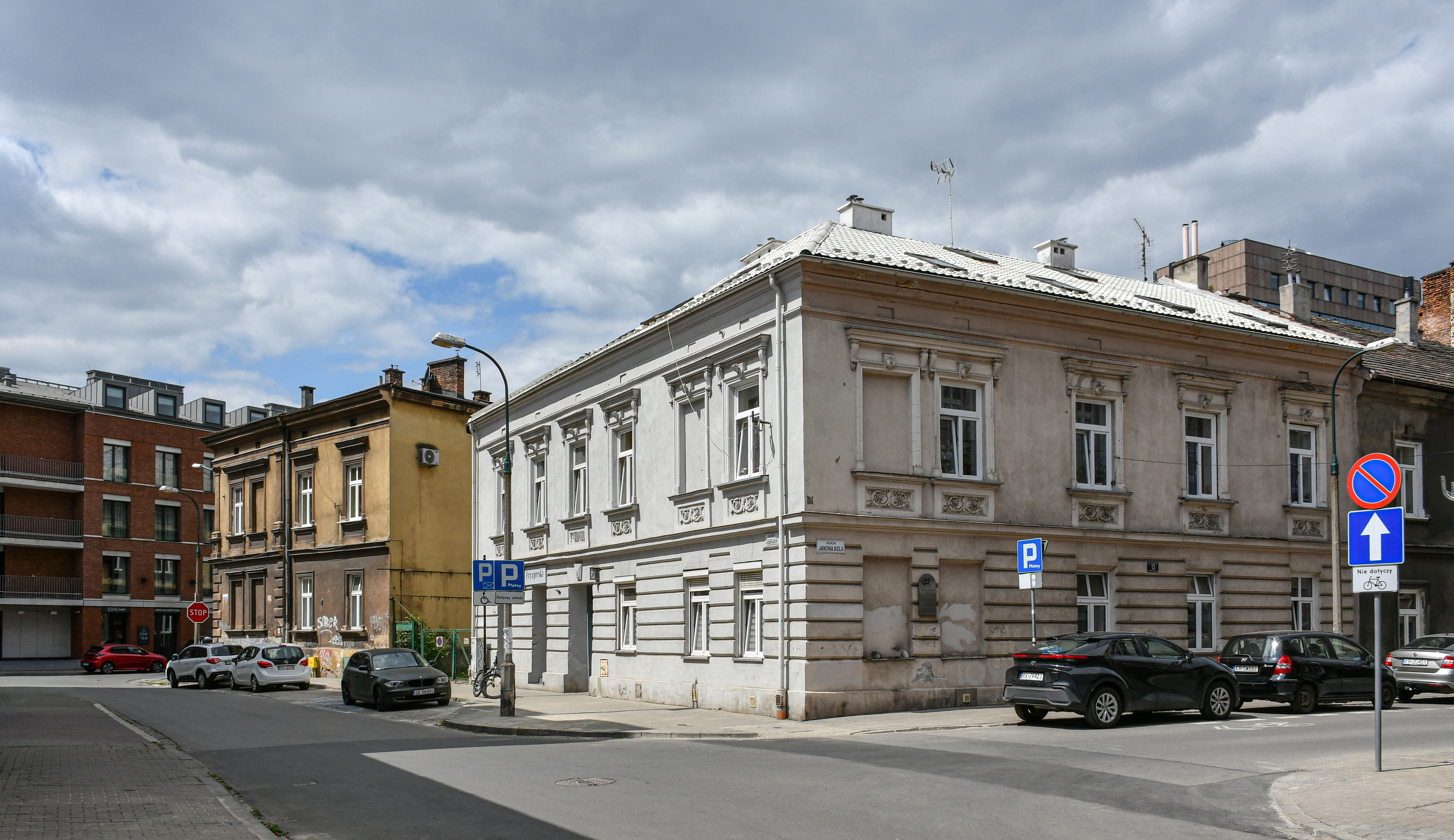
The Ghetto Memory Trail, the intersection of Dąbrówki and Janowa Wola streets. Here in 1942 the Germans murdered Abraham Neumann and Mordechai Gebirtig.

Abraham Neumann (February 6, 1873 – June 4, 1942) was a Polish-Jewish painter and artist active in Kraków and Mandatory Palestine.

== Biography ==
Neumann was born in Sierpc, Congress Poland, on February 6, 1873. In 1892, at the age of 19, he went to Warsaw to study painting and later, in 1897, after being influenced by Samuel Hirszenberg, he decided to study in Kraków's Academy of Fine Arts.

In 1903, he studied in Paris at the Académie Julian. At that time, he also visited England, the Netherlands, Belgium, and Germany. In addition, he also spent time in Israel prior to its founding (British mandate in Palestine), and in the United States where he traveled after the First World War. He taught at the Bezalel Academy of Art and Design in Jerusalem during the years 1925–1927. In 1909, he took part in an exhibition of paintings executed en plein air in Rybiniszki in the Polish Livonia [eastern Latvia]. He lived in Zakopane, Poland, Vienna, and Kraków.

His works consist of paintings of landscapes from the Tatra Mountains, Kazimierz Dolny, Brittany, Palestine, as well as portraits and still lives. He was the first Jewish painter from Poland to go to Palestine in 1904, and also the first to encounter the challenges posed to painting there, including the different kind of light. He struggled to solve these problems for a long time, and by his second journey to the country, local themes had become permanent characteristics in his work.

He belonged to the Kraków branch of the Polish Artists' Union and to the Association of Jewish Painters and Sculptors in Kraków. He participated in the "Sztuka" exhibitions, held individual exhibitions in Kraków and Lvov in Warsaw, Łódź, and Berlin. He also took part in the "Secession" exhibitions in Vienna, and in 1916 he took part in the Jewish Art exhibitions in Warsaw.

Neumann was executed in the Kraków Ghetto on June 4, 1942.

== Gallery of works ==
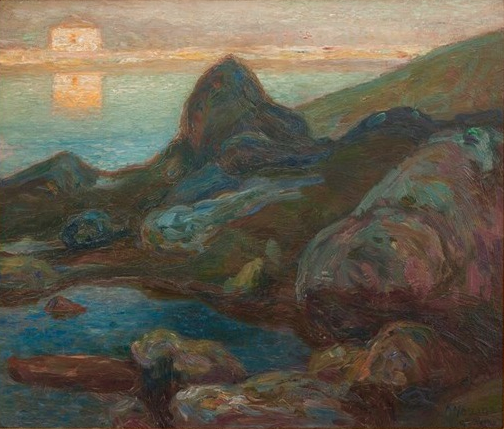
Maison bord de mer, Paris, 1899

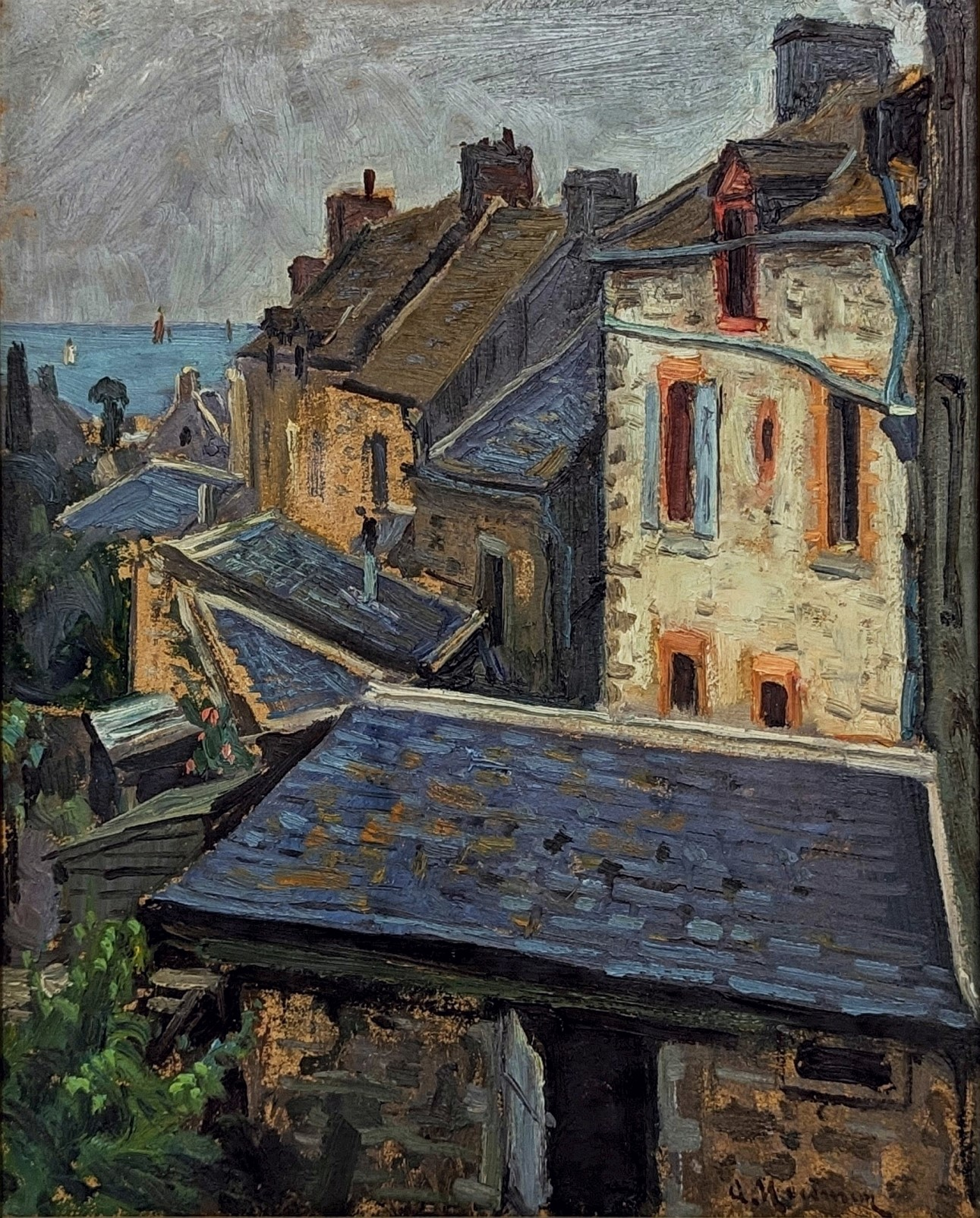
Roofs of houses in Saint-Malo, circa 1923

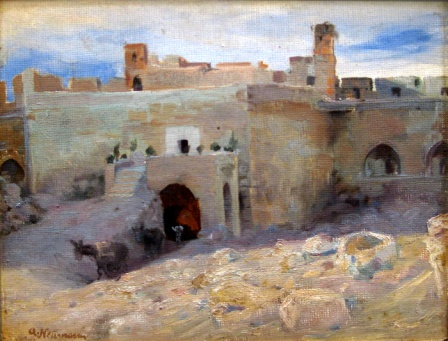
Jerusalem (1923), oil on canvas, 31 × 39 cm (12.2 × 15.4 in).

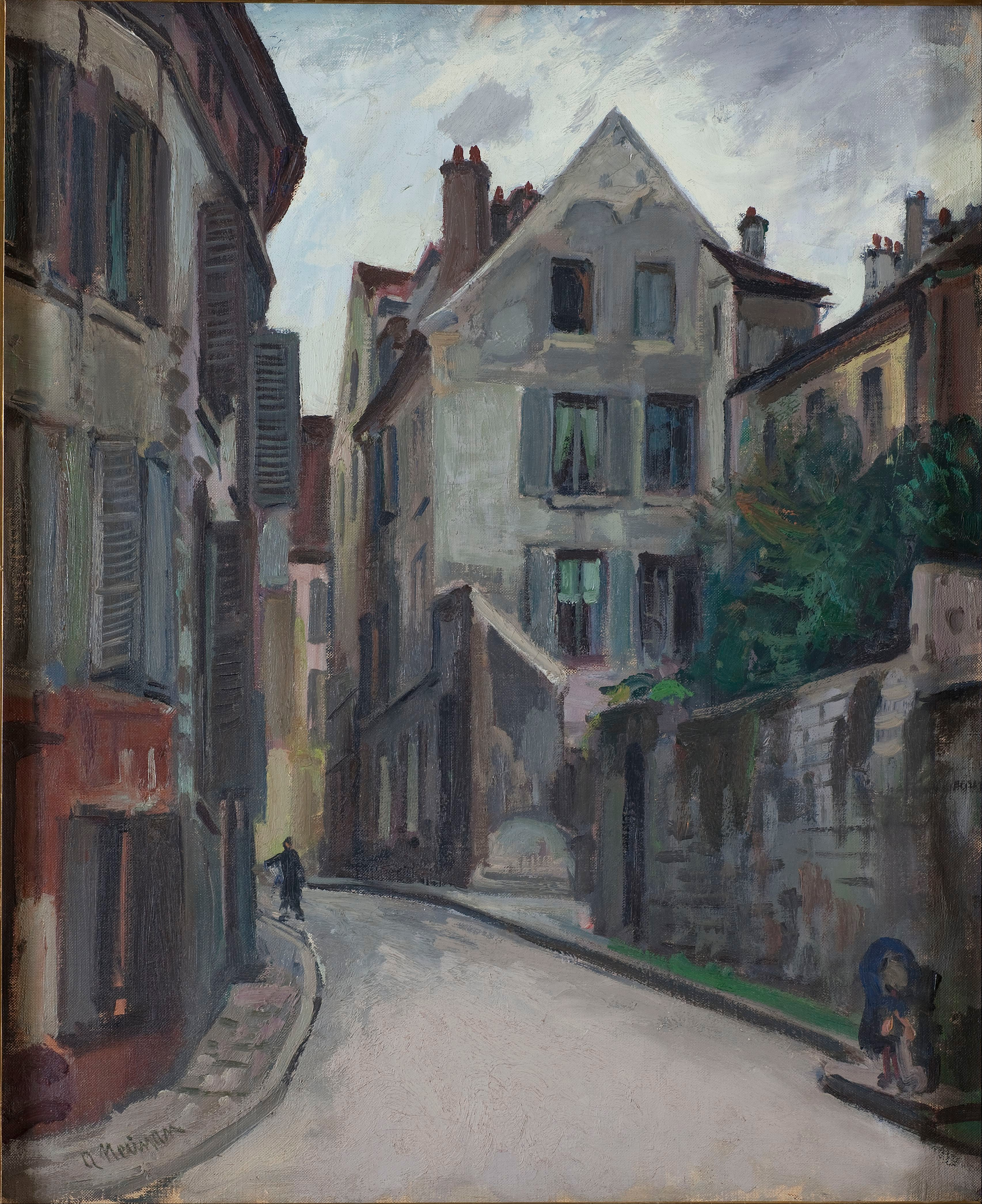
Street, 530 × 650 mm (20.87 × 25.59 in), Muzeum Sztuki, Łódź.

== Selected works ==
- Abraham Neumann (1873-1942) at Gallery97, Tel Aviv
