= Laughter Through Tears =

Studio album by Oi Va Voi
- Released: 29 September 2003
- Genre: Alternative rock, Other
- Length: 49:51 (52:58 including silence)
- Label: Outcaste
- Producer: Kevin Bacon; Jonathan Quarmby

Oi Va Voi chronology
Digital Folklore (2002)	Laughter Through Tears (2003)	Oi Va Voi (2007)

Laughter Through Tears is an album released by London, England-based experimental band Oi Va Voi. Some of the tracks on the album were originally on the band's debut, Digital Folklore, one example is the Hungarian folk song "A Csitári" whose vocals were performed by a male singer in the older album, and by Judit Németh in Laughter Through Tears. The album includes a remix of "7 Brothers" as a hidden track, it is found after the 3 minutes and 7 seconds of silence after "Pagamenska".

== Track listing ==
1. Refugee (featuring KT Tunstall) – 3:37
2. Yesterday's Mistakes (featuring KT Tunstall) – 4:37
3. Od Yeshoma – 4:54
4. A Csitári Hegyek Alatt (featuring Judit Németh) – 4:14
5. Ladino Song (featuring KT Tunstall) – 4:12
6. 7 Brothers (featuring Sevara Nazarkhan) – 4:33
7. D'Ror Yikra (featuring Ben Hassan) – 5:57
8. Gypsy (featuring Earl Zinger) – 4:46
9. Hora – 3:57
10. Pagamenska (featuring Majer Bogdanski) – 4:03
11. 7 Brothers Hefner Remix (Hidden Track) – 4:58
