= Besh o droM =

Balkan music group

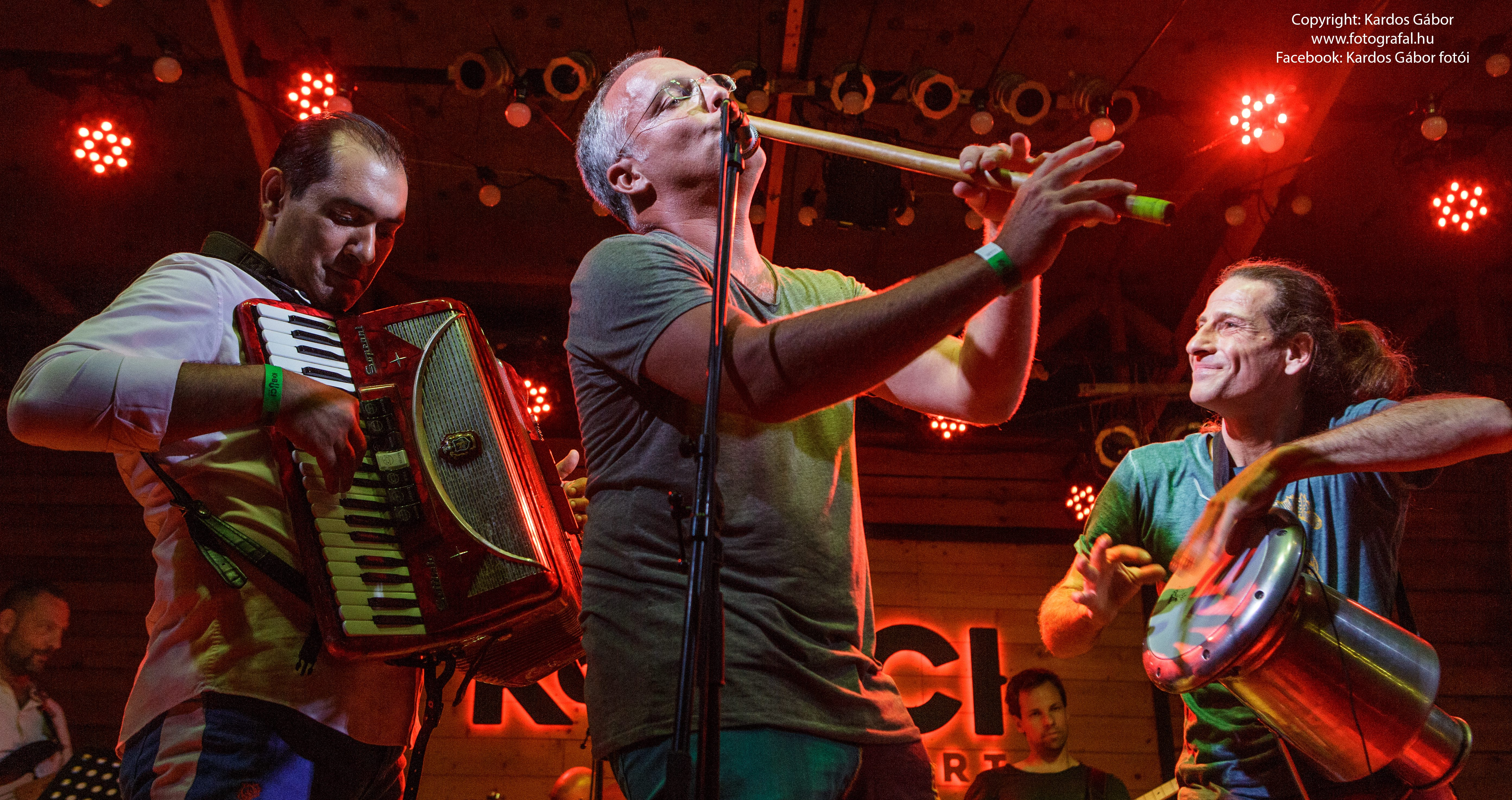
Besh o droM
- Origin: Budapest, Hungary
- Genres: Balkan; Gypsy
- Years active: 1999–present
- Labels: Asphalt Tango, Sidoo Art, Fono Records, Narrator Records
- Members: Gergely Barcza; Ádám Pettik; Attila Herr; Lili Kaszai; József Csurkulya; Vilmos Seres; Máté Hámori; Ákos Szumper; Tamás Molnár
- Website: Official website Myspace

Besh o droM is a Balkan music group. Their music blends folk and contemporary instruments (including the cymbalom and the EWI) in styles ranging from punk rock to world music. They acknowledge particular influences from Transylvanian, Jewish, Turkish, Afghan, Egyptian, Lebanese, Armenian, Bulgarian, Romanian, Macedonian and Greek musical traditions.

The band was formed in Budapest in August 1999, recently based in Budapest, Bristol and Jerusalem. Their Romany name is in the Lovari dialect: Besh o droM means "sit on the road" literally or "ride the road", "ride" in the meaning "ride like on horseback", but its real meaning is "follow your path, get on with it". It is also wordplay in Hungarian meaning "I am rolling..." (a joint).

They appeared in Miklós Jancsó's movie Last Supper at the Arabian Gray Horse. They also composed and performed the original soundtrack for the National Theatre of Szeged's 2001/2002 season of A Midsummer Night's Dream.

== Band members ==
These Hungarian names appear in Eastern name order.

- Barcza Gergely (founder, 1999–) (EWI, saxophone, kaval, ney)
- Pettik Ádám (founder, 1999–) (darabuka drum, kanna (jug), drums, vocals)
- Papesch Péter (2023–) (bass guitar)
- Seres Vilmos (2009–) (clarinet, saxophone)
- Légrádi Gábor (2022–) (EWI, saxophone, kaval)
- Kaszai Lili (2010–) (vocals)
- Hámori Máté (2009–) (guitar)
- Szumper Ákos (2019–) (drums)

== Previous band members ==
- Sidoo Attila (1999–2009) (guitar)
- Tóth József (1999–2000) (saxophone)
- Orczy Géza (1999–2002) (tapan)
- Farkas Róbert (1999–2002) (accordion, violin)
- DJ Mango (2000–2001) (scratch, rap)
- Tóth Péter (2000–2006) (trumpet)
- Talabos Csaba (2002–2005) (tapan)
- Beszteri Róbert (2002–2003) (tapan)
- Molnár László (2000) (double bass)
- Szalóki Ágnes (1999–2005) (vocals)
- Bese Csaba (1999–2002) (bass guitar)
- Zsoldos Tamás (2002–2005) (bass guitar)
- Vajdovich Árpád (2005–2007) (bass guitar)
- Juhász Miczura Mónika (2005–2006) (vocals)
- Magyar Borbála (2007–2010) (vocals)
- Bede Péter (2000–2001) (saxophone)
- Monori András (2000) (trumpet)
- Békési László (2001–2007) (tenor saxophone, clarinet)
- Varga László (–2008) (percussion)
- Somos Péter (2008–2010) (drums)
- Vadász Páter (2010–2019) (drums)
- Herr Attila (2007–2023) (bass guitar)
- Molnár Tamás Gergely (2012–2022) (saxophone)
- Csurkulya József (1999–2023) (cimbalom)

=== Guest artist ===
- Margit Bangó (2007) (vocals)

== Discography ==
- Macsó hímzés (Macho Embroidery) (Fonó Records, 2000)
- Nekemtenemmutogatol (Can't Make Me!) (2002)
- GYI! (2004)
- Ha megfogom az ördögöt… (Once I Catch The Devil) (2005)
- Kertünk alatt (Narrator Records, 2011)
- Best of droM (Narrator Records, 2012)
- Gyüttmenti Táncok EP (Self-released, 2016)
- Besh o droM20 (Fonó Records, 2020)
