= Voices from Within =

Studio album by Distorted
- Released: April 7, 2008
- Recorded: November–December 2007 at Studio Underground, Sweden
- Genre: Death/doom; Oriental metal Progressive metal
- Label: Candlelight (Europe); Helicon (Israel)
- Producer: Pelle Saether

Distorted chronology
Memorial (2006)	Voices from Within (2008)

Professional ratings
Review scores
Source	Rating
About.com	3.5/5 stars
Allmusic	3/5 stars

Voices from Within is the second full-length studio album by Israeli oriental death/doom metal band Distorted, released on April 7, 2008.

== Track listing ==
No.	Title	Length
1.	"One Last Breath"	5:36
2.	"What Remains"	3:45
3.	"Voices from Within"	5:28
4.	"Fading"	3:49
5.	"A Soft Whisper"	4:14
6.	"Reveal My Path"	3:41
7.	"Escaping the Mind-Grid"	6:03
8.	"Obscure"	3:24
9.	"Tehom"	1:22
10.	"Consistent Duality"	5:22
11.	"Letting Go"	6:12
12.	"As You Lay" (Hidden track)	3:58

== Credits ==
=== Guest musicians ===
- Sven De Caluwe (Aborted)
- Henrik Jacobsen (Koldborn, Hatesphere)
- Lisa Johansson (Draconian)
- Thomas Vikstrom (Therion)

== Release history ==
Country	Date
Europe	7 April 2008
Israel	9 April 2008
United States	29 April 2008
