= Memorial (Distorted album) =

Studio album by Distorted
- Released: 13 March 2006
- Recorded: 2005 at Studio Underground, Sweden
- Genre: Death/doom; Oriental metal Progressive metal
- Length: 47:34
- Label: NMC (Israel); Bad Reputation (Europe)
- Producer: Pelle Saether

Distorted chronology
Illusive (2004)	Memorial (2006)	Voices from Within (2008)

Memorial is the debut album of the Israeli oriental death/doom metal band Distorted, released in 2006.

== Track listing ==
No.	Title	Length
1.	"In Your Light"	7:09
2.	"Memorial"	7:19
3.	"Children of Fall"	5:26
4.	"Flesh and Blood"	6:11
5.	"Redemption"	4:41
6.	"Sometimes"	4:12
7.	"Is It the Wind"	4:51
8.	"Illusive"	5:39
9.	"Hesped"	2:00
Total length:		47:34

== Release history ==
Country	Date
Israel	13 March 2006
Europe	2 May 2006
