= Adam Pettik =

Hungarian musician

Ádám Pettik Pettik Ádám
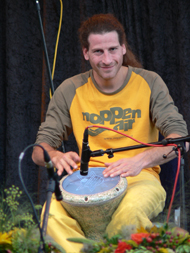

Background information
- Born: 26 August 1972 (age 54)
- Genres: world music; Balkanian Gypsy; blues; funk
- Occupations: producer, musician, singer-songwriter, percussionist, instrument creator, instrument constructor
- Instruments: darabuka, traditional Hungarian Gypsy water can, peckdrum, viola
- Years active: 1987 – present
- Labels: Fono Records, Asphalt Tango, Sidoo Art, Narrator Records, BMG, Universal-3T
- Website: www.beshodrom.hu

Ádám Pettik (Hungarian: Pettik Ádám; born 26 August 1972) is a Hungarian musician, singer-songwriter, percussionist and instrument creator. He is the founder of the world music band Besh o droM.

== Early life ==
Pettik was born in Budapest, Hungary. His first drum lesson was at age seven. When he joined the band Tükörország, he began playing percussion. Having played with several bands and experimenting with different sounds, he discovered the gypsy water can and it became his favourite instrument. Pettik has played with Kalyi Jag (water jug), Tatros, Boban Marković, Félix Lajkó, Noir Désir (percussion).

== Career ==
In 1999 Ádám Pettik and his brother-in-law Gergely Barcza, a saxophonist, founded the band Besh o droM along with Jozsef Toth, also a saxophonist. They have been acknowledged as the first worldwide Hungarian world music band. Their music combines Balkan Gypsy, Hungarian, rock, funk and Middle Eastern songs adapted peculiarly by mixing different styles. Since the beginning of Sziget Festival they have performed every year as the only residential band of the World Music Main Stage. Their songs have been selected on several world music and balkan beat box compilation CD-s. Pettik has travelled around the world with Besh o droM: In 2004 they played at Montreal International Jazz Festival in front of 35000 people where the band became the 'best of' the festival that year. Later in 2012 they performed again in front of a 60000 people audience. They performed at WOMEX 2001 Rotterdam, WOMAD UK in 2009 and at WOMADelaide Australia in 2010.

== Discography ==
- Besh o droM: 20 (2020 Fonó Records)
- Besh o droM: Gyüttmenti táncok (2016) self-released
- Besh o droM: Kertünk alatt (2011)
- Besh o droM: Ha megfogom az ördögöt… Once I Catch the Devil (2005) self-released
- Amikor én még kissrác voltam - Tisztelgés az Illés zenekar előtt (2005) Universal
- Besh o droM: Gyí! (2004) self-released
- Besh o droM: Nekemtenemmutogatol (2002) self-released
- Besh o droM: Macsó hímzés (2000) Fonó Records
- Kispál és a Borz: Velőrózsák (2000) Universal-3T
- Lajkó Félix és Zenekara (1997) self-released
- Korom Attila: Hajnali (1997) Polygram
