= Distorted (band) =

Israeli heavy metal band

- Origin: Bat-Yam, Israel
- Genres: Death-doom; oriental metal; progressive metal
- Years active: 1996–present
- Label: Candlelight
- Members: Miri Milman; Raffael Mor; Naor Zakk; Amir Sami Eliakim; Tchelet Ben Yehuda
- Past members: Miri Milman; Michal Akrabi; Matan Shmuely; Shaked Furman; Ohad Alon

Distorted is a heavy metal band from Bat-Yam, Israel.

== History ==
The band was formed in 1996 and released two demos. In 2002, they began concentrating on playing live. In 2001, the band released its first official release, a self-titled EP, which was followed by another EP that was recorded in 2003 and released in 2004 - Illusive. Following the release of those EPs, the band started performing extensively around the Tel Aviv area, supporting such international bands as Edguy, Destruction, and Megadeth, and such local bands as Betzefer, Salem, and Orphaned Land.

In 2003 and 2004, the band began to write the music for their debut album, Memorial, recorded in 2005 in Studio Underground in Sweden. The band signed a deal with NMC Records in Israel and French label Bad Reputation for worldwide release. The album was released on March 13, 2006, in Israel and May 2, 2006, in the rest of Europe. The band toured Israel and Europe to support the album, including performing at the 2007 Metal Female Voices Fest in Belgium, and supporting Aborted on their European tour. On July 12, 2007, the band signed a worldwide distribution three-album deal with UK-based label Candlelight Records.

The band parted ways with lead singer Miri Milman in late 2008 for personal reasons and musical differences. The band announced the new singer would be Michal Akrabi.

Michal performed with the band on some shows, including opening for Draconian on their show in Israel and the 2009 Hellelujah Metal Fest. It was announced on May 26, 2009, that Michal would leave the band and Israel to study music in the UK. The band continued without her. They announced they would continue writing material for their third album, due for release in 2010 on Candlelight Records.

In March 2010, the band announced its newest lead singer, Dor Mazor. Mazor's debut show with the band took place on June 3, 2010, at the Barby club in Tel Aviv, Israel, opening for Swallow the Sun.

== Influences ==
The band cite their influences as Opeth, Nevermore, Dark Tranquility and The Gathering, though there is a heavy Middle-Eastern influence to their sound, similar to countrymates Orphaned Land.

== Band members ==
=== Current members ===
- Miri Milman – Lead Vocals (1998–2008, 2022–present)
- Raffael Mor – Guitar, Harsh Vocals (1996–present)
- Naor Zakk – Guitar (2022–present)
- Amir Sami Eliakim – Bass (2022–present)
- Tchelet Ben Yehuda– Drums, percussion

=== Former members ===
- Michal Akrabi – lead vocals (2008–2009)
- Ori Eshel – drums, percussion (1996–2006)
- Matan Shmuely – drums, percussion (2006–2007)
- Shaked Furman – drums, percussion (2007–2008)
- Ohad Alon – drums, percussion (2022–2024)

== Discography ==
=== Studio albums ===
- (2006) Memorial
- (2008) Voices from Within

=== Singles and EPs ===
- (2001) Distorted
- (2004) Illusive
- (2023) time abuser- Time abuser video

=== Demos ===
- Distorted (1998, three tracks)
- Demo (2000, two tracks)
