= Przytyk pogrom =

1936 outbreak of anti-Jewish violence in Przytyk, Poland

- Part of antisemitism in Poland
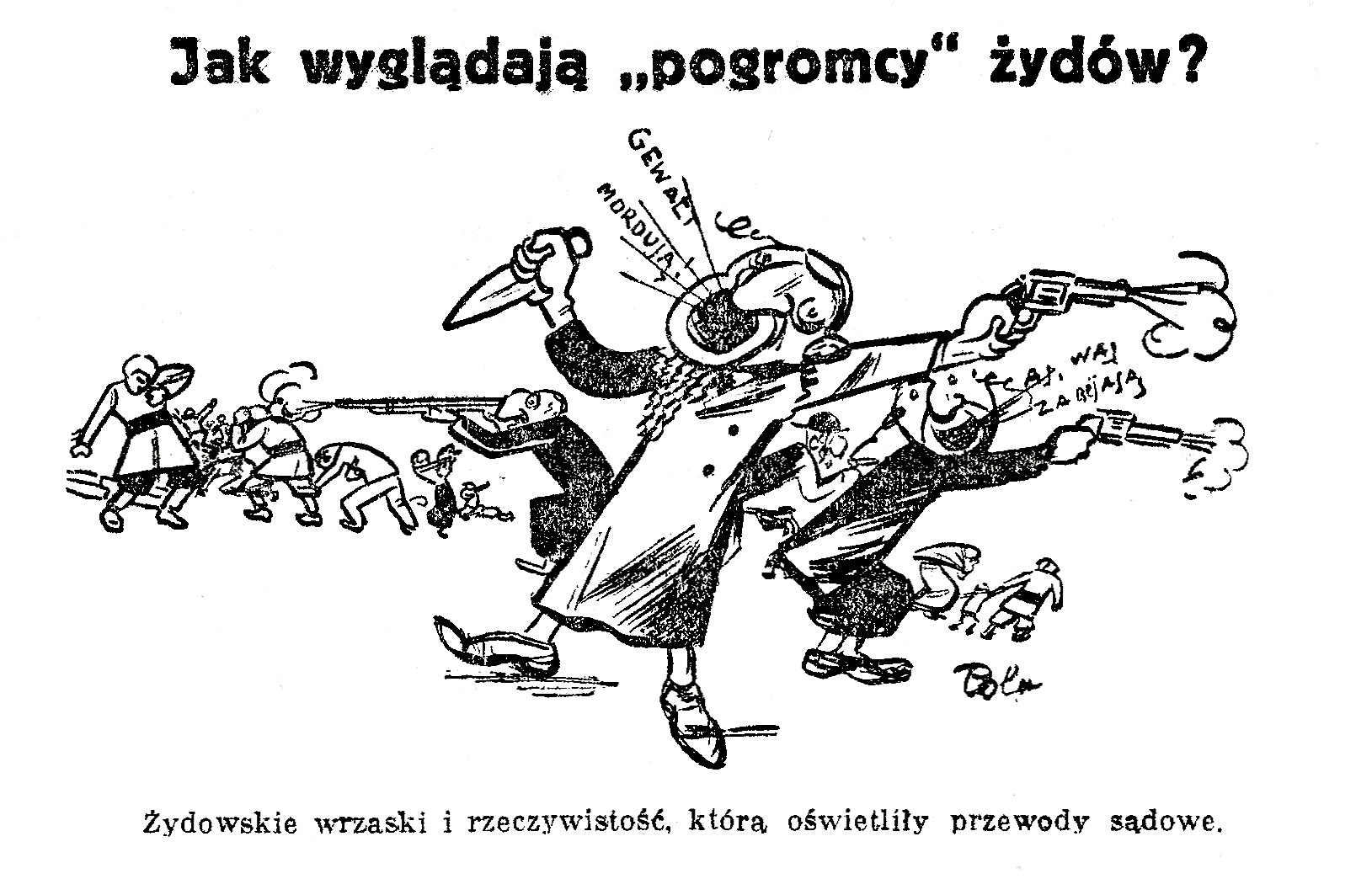
- A contemporary antisemitic caricature from the newspaper Dziennik Bydgoski depicting the event as a Jewish riot
- Location: Przytyk, Second Polish Republic
- Date: 9 March 1936; 45 minutes
- Target: Polish Jews
- Deaths: 3
- Injuries: 20+
- Motive: Poverty
- Accused: 57
- Convictions: 6 months - 8 years imprisonment
- Convicted: 50

The Przytyk pogrom or Przytyk riots occurred between the Polish and Jewish communities in Przytyk, Radom County, Kielce Voivodeship, Second Polish Republic, on March 9, 1936. Previously, on January 28, authorities had suspended the weekly market for four weeks because of the fear of violence from the violent antisemitic National Democracy party (Endecja). The disorder began as a small dispute between a Jewish baker and a Polish farmer selling his wares. Disturbances took on such a severe dimension as a result of the use of firearms by Jews. According to historian Emanuel Melzer, it was the most notorious incident of antisemitic violence in Poland in the interwar period, and attracted worldwide attention, being one of a series of pogroms that occurred in Poland during the years immediately before the outbreak of World War II. The term pogrom is contested by some sources, who instead assert that the word "riot" might be more suitable as the violence was unplanned. Some Polish historians hold the opinion that the Jewish side might have started the disturbance.

== Background ==
During the interwar period, Przytyk was an urban settlement. By 1930 it was inhabited by 2,302 people, 1,852 of whom were Jews (80 percent of the total population) who dominated the local economy. The Jews owned and operated the credit union, power station, transportation companies, bakeries, slaughter houses, tailoring shops, breweries, tobacco manufacturing plants, and groceries. Central markets were organized once a week, always on Mondays, drawing in crowds from nearby towns and villages. The competition for market shares between Jews and a much smaller community of gentile Poles was intense. In 1935 local Poles created 50 small companies allowing Polish farmers to bypass Jewish merchants, undercutting trade by Jewish locals.

David Vital, a historian of Tel Aviv University, writes that local peasants were stirred by antisemitic propaganda spread by Endecja politicians. A boycott of Jewish shops was organized, and escalated into a wave of violent attacks on Jewish shops, which resulted in the creation of a Jewish self-defense group. Piotr Gontarczyk, historian at the Polish Institute of National Remembrance, however, argues that the target of the Endecja campaign was to improve the standard of living of Poles and to support Polish businesses. An economic conflict between Poles and Jews began, in which both sides used all means possible, including violence. At the same time, the Second Polish Republic remained in an economic slump, and Polish peasants, whose profits had been drastically reduced, began to look for other means of supporting themselves. In mid-1935, Polish right-wing political activists in Radom County declared a general boycott of Jewish stores. The local Endecja sometimes resorted to violence, with activists urging Poles to stop buying at Jewish stores. In response, Jewish merchants begun flooding the market with their goods, pushing prices down so that newcomers couldn't compete with them.

In December 1935, a group of some 20 young Jews created their own armed and illegal self-defense unit, headed by a former officer of the Polish Army, Icek Frydman. Frydman organized military training for its members. The group was armed with illegally purchased guns, iron bars, and batons. Their task was to mobilize Jewish community in case of a violent conflict.

In the interbellum period, an annual kazimierzowski fair took place at Przytyk. In 1936, some 2,000 peasants attended, and since Polish police officers were aware of the possible conflict, the local department, which consisted of 5 officers, was strengthened by additional 11 officers, which later turned out to be an inadequate number. Furthermore, the police at Radom were on alert, ready to intervene. Jewish merchants of Przytyk, a town with a 90% Jewish majority, hoped that the early spring fair would help to improve their financial situation, but the armosphere in the town was tense, according to the official report of the voivode of Kielce: "We have to emphasize the fact that the idea of an economic boycott of Jews, put forward by the National Democracy, was embraced by the local peasantry, which feels hatred towards the Jews (...) The boycott itself leads [Jewish] merchants to despair, because the economic basis of their existence is threatened".

== The riot ==
Two days before the events some of the Jewish inhabitants assembled in the town square in anticipation of the attack by the farmers, but nothing happened on that day. Two days later, however, on a market day, according to historians Martin Gilbert and David Vital, the farmers attacked the Jews; the fight ended with two Jewish and one Polish casualty.

Gontarczyk writes in his book, Pogrom? Zajścia polsko-żydowskie w Przytyku 9 marca 1936 r. Mity, fakty, dokumenty (transl. Pogrom? Polish-Jewish incidents in Przytyk on March 9, 1936: myths, facts, documents), that the first incident took place early in the morning of March 9, when Jewish merchants destroyed a stall which belonged to a Polish hat-maker. Police intervened, but on the same day, at 15:00, a member of the Endecja, Józef Strzałkowski, appeared in front of a stall of a Jewish baker, urging Polish peasants not to buy any products from Jewish merchants. The baker kicked Strzałkowski's crutch, and in return, the Pole hit him in the arm. The baker reported the incident to the police that resulted in Strzalkowski's arrest. The consequence generated outrage amongst the Polish farmers, who encircled the police station, demanding the release of Strzałkowski. During the subsequent 20 minutes, the peasants and Jewish youth, which also began gathering in the town square, were dispersed by the police.

According to a report by Ksawery Pruszynski, the cause of the riots was a fight over a stall, Pruszynski noting that one likely cause for these events was extreme poverty of both local sides of the conflict. According to the journalist Julian Brun: "after the first "misunderstandings", the police quickly took on the role: they directed their weapons only against the Jews who were being beaten."

Polish peasants, aware of their numerical superiority, began gathering on the other side of the Radomka river. Near the bridge, another riot began, when Jewish stalls were turned over. A group of Jews arrived and armed with revolvers and clubs started attacking random bystanders. Both sides threw rocks at each other, and the police had to divide their forces into two groups. One was busy dispersing the peasants, while another one was trying to restrain the Jews, who kept on throwing rocks. When the police seemed to have settled the situation, a Jewish member of the Mizrachi movement, Szulim Chil Leska, began shooting at Poles from the window of a house. Leska killed a peasant named Stanisław Wieśniak.Two other Poles were shot as well. This infuriated the Polish crowd of some 1,000, which the police were unable to control.

Altogether, the riot lasted for some 45 minutes. A crowd of peasants, enraged by the killing of one of their own, beat up several Jews, smashing several stores and stalls, including a store which belonged to Fajga Szuchowa. Among others, the house of a woman named Sura Borensztajn, where a number of Jews hid, was attacked. A Jewish couple, Chaja and Josek Minkowski were killed during the riot, while their children were beaten up. Josek, who was a shoemaker, was probably killed by an axe in the hall of his house. His wife was severely beaten and died in hospital in Radom. Furthermore, 24 Jews were injured. A secret report, written after the riot by regional authorities from Kielce to the Polish Ministry of Internal Affairs, claims as follows: "The incident turned out into such a serious riot only after the Jews used guns, killing Wieśniak, which caused further bloody events".

== Aftermath ==
Officially, three people were killed and more than 20 injured, but the number of the injured Polish peasants was probably larger, as many of them decided not to go to hospital. An investigation was immediately started, with arrests of Szulim Chil Leska, his father and one peasant. At first, the police did not believe the peasants, who presented their version of the riot, and 22 Poles were soon arrested. On March 16 however, with the investigation still going on, three members of Jewish self-defence group were incarcerated: Icek Banda, Luzer Kirszencwajg and Chaim Świeczka.

Four days earlier, on March 12, Senator Moses Schorr publicly mentioned the riot, accusing local government and police of supporting the peasants. As Gontarczyk claims, Schorr's words, in which he talked about three brutally killed Jewish victims, without mentioning that one of the victims was Polish, resulted in complete distortion of the description of the events, as his words were immediately repeated worldwide, resulting in a wave of anti-Polish sentiment among the Jewish diaspora. Furthermore, the Cracow daily Nowy Dziennik published an article by the Sejm deputy Ozjasz Thon, in which, for the first time, he used the word pogrom, writing about "two human victims" at Przytyk. Gontarczyk claims in his book that among Jewish newspapers in Mandatory Palestine, only Davar stated that Jews were responsible for the riots, as it was a Jew who first killed a peasant.

The trial following the events started on June 2 and involved 43 Polish and 14 Jewish defendants, the latter charged with aggressive behavior towards Polish peasants. The verdict was pronounced on June 26, with eleven of the Jews sentenced to prison terms of from 6 months to 8 years (the person sentenced for 8 years was Szulim Chil Leska, the killer of Stanisław Wieśniak. Later, Leska's sentence was reduced to 7 years), while 39 Poles received sentences from 6 months to 1 year. The accused Jews claimed they were acting in self-defense, but the court rejected those arguments. The verdict outraged the Jewish community in Poland, leading to a number of nationwide strikes.

News of this pogrom horrified the Polish Jewish population, as well as Jews around the world, and contributed to significant emigration from Poland of Jews. A one-day nationwide strike, supported by left-wing parties Bund and PPS was organized, and in other parts of the country, street fights took place. In June 1936 in Mińsk Mazowiecki, after Jan Bujak, a Wachtmeister of the local 7th Uhlan Regiment was shot by a Jewish resident Judka Lejb Chaskielewicz, riots erupted in which several Jewish stores were smashed. The situation in Przytyk itself remained tense. Local Jews were supported by their American diaspora, which sent money and food to Przytyk. According to Gontarczyk, the collection of money for Jewish residents of the town resulted in a growing negative propaganda aimed at Poles. As Gontarczyk wrote, volunteers, while collecting funds, presented the picture of Poland as a "wild country of pogroms", hoping to collect as much money as possible. The tendentious information about the situation of Jews in Poland created false stereotypes of antisemitic Poles.

The poem-song Es brent was written by Mordechai Gebirtig in 1938 about the pogrom.

== Bibliography ==
- Gontarczyk, Piotr (2000). Pogrom?: zajścia polsko-żydowskie w Przytyku 9 marca 1936 r.: mity, fakty, dokumenty [Pogrom? Polish-Jewish incidents in Przytyk on March 9, 1936: myths, facts, documents] (in Polish). Oficyna Wydawnicza Rekonkwista (lit. 'Reconquest Publishing House'). pp. 70, 193. ISBN 978-83-86379-62-0.
