= Travelling the Face of the Globe =

Studio album by Oi Va Voi
- Released: 8 May 2009
- Genre: Alternative
- Length: 45:50
- Label: Oi Va Voi
- Producers: Kevin Bacon; Jonathan Quarmby

Oi Va Voi chronology
Oi Va Voi (2007)	Travelling the Face of the Globe (2009)

Travelling the Face of the Globe is the fourth studio album released by London, England based band Oi Va Voi. The first single of the album is Every Time.

== Track listing ==
No.	Title	Lyrics	Music	Length
1.	"Waiting"	Nik Ammar, Steve Levi	Nik Ammar, Josh Breslaw, Steve Levi, Dave Orchant	4:10
2.	"I Know What You Are"	Bridgette Amofah, Steve Levi	Nik Ammar, Josh Breslaw, Steve Levi, Bridgette Amofah	3:06
3.	"Travelling the Face of the Globe"	Nik Ammar	Nik Ammar, Josh Breslaw, Steve Levi	3:48
4.	"Every Time"	Steve Levi	Nik Ammar, Josh Breslaw, Steve Levi	5:36
5.	"S'brent" (featuring Ági Szalóki)	Mordechai Gebirtig	Nik Ammar, Josh Breslaw, Steve Levi / Trad	3:56
6.	"Magic Carpet"		Nik Ammar, Josh Breslaw, Steve Levi, Dave Orchant	4:34
7.	"Dusty Road"	Nik Ammar	Nik Ammar, Josh Breslaw, Steve Levi, Dave Orchant	3:17
8.	"Foggy Day"	Nik Ammar	Nik Ammar, Josh Breslaw, Steve Levi, Dave Orchant	3:36
9.	"Wonder" (featuring Ági Száloki)	Nik Ammar	Nik Ammar, Josh Breslaw, Steve Levi, Lemez Lovas	3:16
10.	"Long Way From Home"	Nik Ammar	Nik Ammar, Josh Breslaw, Steve Levi, Dave Orchant	3:11
11.	"Stitches and Runs"	Bridgette Amofah, Steve Levi	Nik Ammar, Josh Breslaw, Steve Levi, Bridgette Amofah	3:38
12.	"Photograph" (featuring Dick Rivers)	Nik Ammar, Steve Levi	Nik Ammar, Josh Breslaw, Steve Levi	3:48

== Personnel ==
- Nik Ammar - guitar, charango, strumstick, kazoo, percussion
- Bridgette Amofah - vocals
- Josh Breslaw - drums, percussion
- Steve Levi - clarinet, vocals
- Dave Orchant - trumpet
- Anna Phoebe - violin
- Lucy Shaw - double bass, electric bass
