= Zohara =

Israeli musician (born 1988)

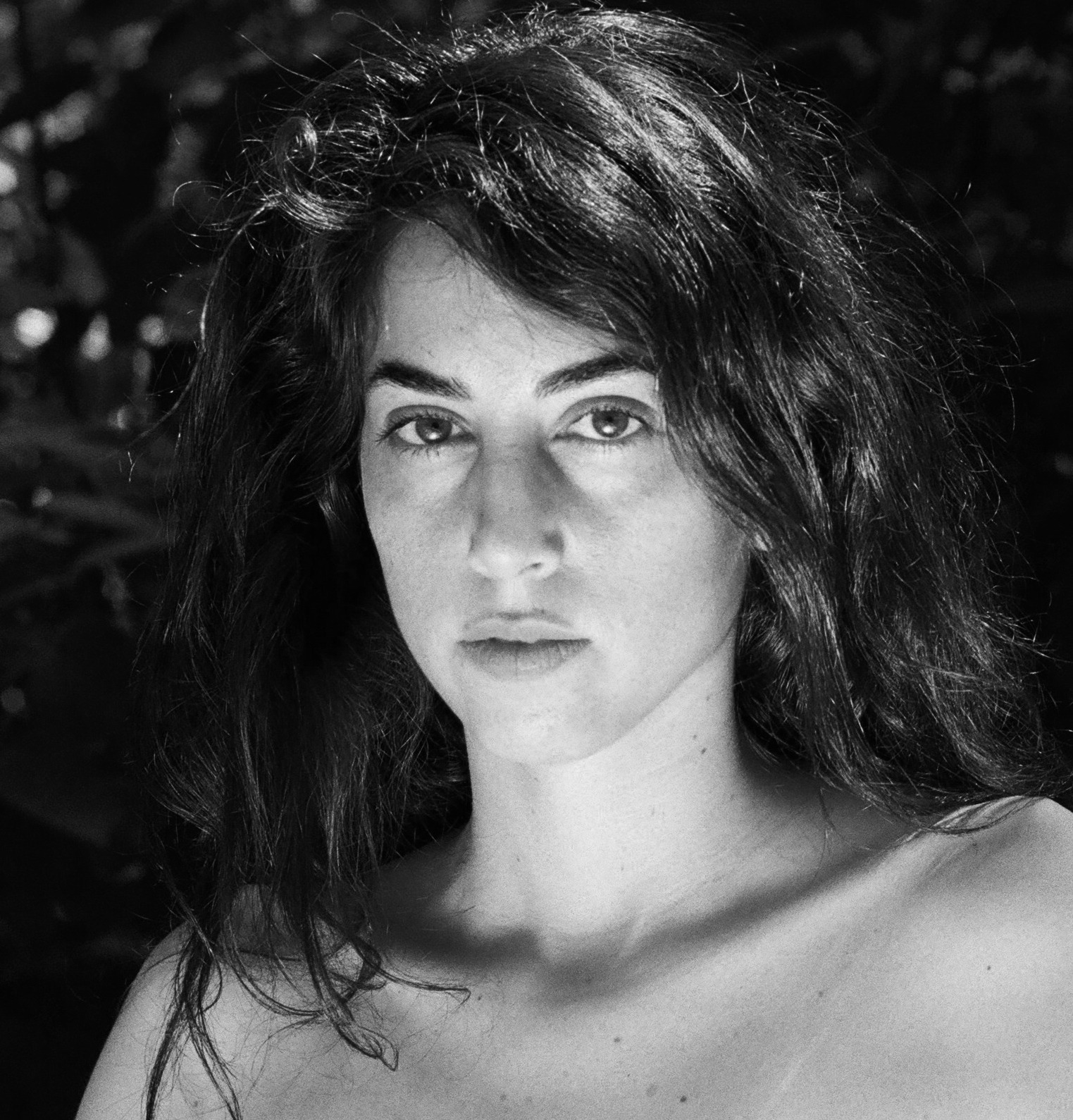

Background information
- Born: Zohara Niddam; 1988 (age 37–38)
- Origin: London, UK
- Genres: Electronic; Indie; Avant-pop; Experimental pop
- Occupations: Musician; singer; producer
- Years active: 2012–present
- Label: Independent
- Member of: Oi Va Voi
- Website: www.zoharamusic.net

Zohara (זוהרה, born 1988) is an Israeli musician known for fusing electronic production with Middle Eastern instrumentation, pop, classical and jazz.

== Career ==
Between 2012 and 2014, Zohara produced her first album Growing up Anyways, released in 2016. The album is made of 12 original songs that mostly deal with the doubts of people in their early twenties.

...Anyway give it listen (and watch) yourself and make up your own mind. We reckon Zohara deserves to be up there in the charts and in the public consciousness. Whether she will though depends on the odd machinations of the music industry but she deserves it.

— FLUX Magazine

In 2013 Zohara performed in Israel and London and made music videos. The videos were released in 2014–2015. One song, "Drum & Bass", was broadcast on MTV World, and her song "Lost" premiered on British magazine Konbini.

..Reminiscent of Bjork, say, but with a gritty, DIY sensibility, it's early days for Zohara – but these are promising signs.

— Clash Music

In 2017, Zohara became the lead singer of the British band Oi Va Voi. Their album Memory Drop was released by V2 in 2018, to critical acclaim, and was featured in The Guardian, Evening Standard and Songlines. The band appeared on The Tom Robinson Show (BBC 6 Music), Clive Anderson (BBC 4), the Dutch TV show Nijverheid, and sold out both of their London shows at Omeara and Islington Assembly Hall. They finished 2018 touring in Germany, Holland, Russia, Turkey, and Israel. In 2019, Zohara performed at The Royal Academy of Arts as part of Anthony Gormley's exhibition, headlined The Shacklewell Arms, supported Audiobooks at Electrowerkz and Paper Dress Vintage, and continued touring Europe as the lead singer of Oi Va Voi.

In 2020, Zohara signed to Studio Bruxo, established by sound artist David Wrench, who has worked with artists such as Frank Ocean, Caribou, Glass Animals, Arlo Parks, Manics, Goldfrapp, David Byrne, Erasure, XX, FKA Twigs, Sampha and Jungle.

In 2023, she released the single "Intro" on the London label Slow Dance, as part of their yearly compilation. Hard of Hearing Magazine wrote: "Also subtly ear-catching is Zohara, an incredibly exciting artist and producer. Her piece ‘Intro’ has something of mallwave about it but broadens its scope in drawing on Middle Eastern influences and the artist’s jazz background."

In 2024, Zohara released her second solo album Welcoming the Golden Age. Five singles were issued from the album, three of them via Studio Bruxo: "Sing a Song", "Curly" and "Ballad21".

In 2025, Zohara released three singles: "Thanks God the Russians Came", "I Didn't Have a Brat Summer" and a cover of Björk's "Jóga". Indie Underrated wrote of "I Didn't Have a Brat Summer": "Her voice is dramatic and emotive, with phrasing that showcases a heavy jazz influence. Sounding almost like a show tune written for the dance floor. The gloriously ironic video encompasses the song’s theme." The Wild Is Calling described the single as "a fun psychedelic trip… stylistically we think it connects with artists like Björk and FKA Twigs. It’s really smart pop."

Her cover of Björk’s "Jóga" received international press attention, including:

- Earmilk: "resistance and radiance… a protest in grace."
- York Calling: "I had goosebumps while listening to the track’s climax."
- The Big Takeover: "If only all artists could approach covering a song with the same amount of imagination and creative intellect."
- Beach House Magazine: "layering in Arabic instrumentation and modern electronic elements in a way that feels natural, not forced."
- Obscure Sound: "The track invigorates in ZOHARA’s evident vocal power, in addition to the infusion of Arabic instruments with deep history."

In November 2025, the Bristol, UK performance venue Strange Brew apologized for cancelling an Oi Va Voi performance, partly over Zohara's cover art for Welcoming the Golden Age.

== Discography ==
=== Albums ===
Date	Title
2016-11-13	Growing Up Anyways
2024	Welcoming the Golden Age

=== Selected Singles ===
- 2015 – "Soldier"
- 2015 – "Bass & Drum"
- 2015 – "Lost"
- 2015 – "Piano 1976"
- 2015 – "New Village"
- 2015 – "Play" (BalconyTV)
- 2015 – "Amplify Me" (IndieCity)
- 2023 – "Intro" (Slow Dance compilation)
- 2024 – "Sing a Song"
- 2024 – "Curly"
- 2024 – "Ballad21"
- 2025 – "Thanks God the Russians Came"
- 2025 – "I Didn't Have a Brat Summer"
- 2025 – "Jóga" (Björk cover)
