= Kaddish (Salem album) =

Studio album by Salem
- Released: 1994
- Genre: Death/doom

Salem chronology
Creating Our Sins (1992)	Kaddish (1994)	A Moment of Silence (1998)

Kaddish is a 1994 album by Salem. The album was one of the first Israeli extreme metal albums to engage with recent Jewish history and the Holocaust.
