= Mordechai Gebirtig =

Polish Jewish poet and songwriter

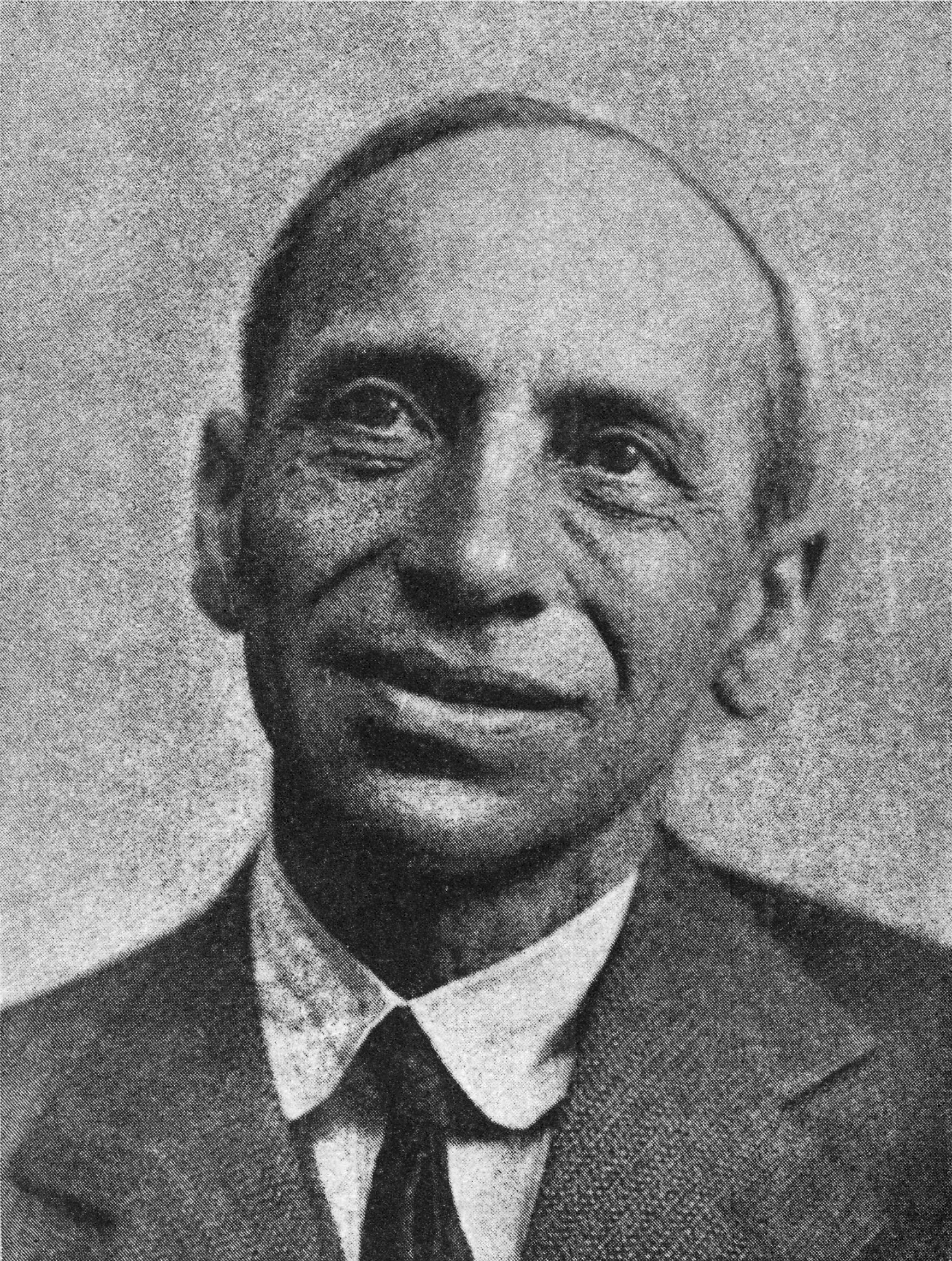
Portrait of Gebirtig

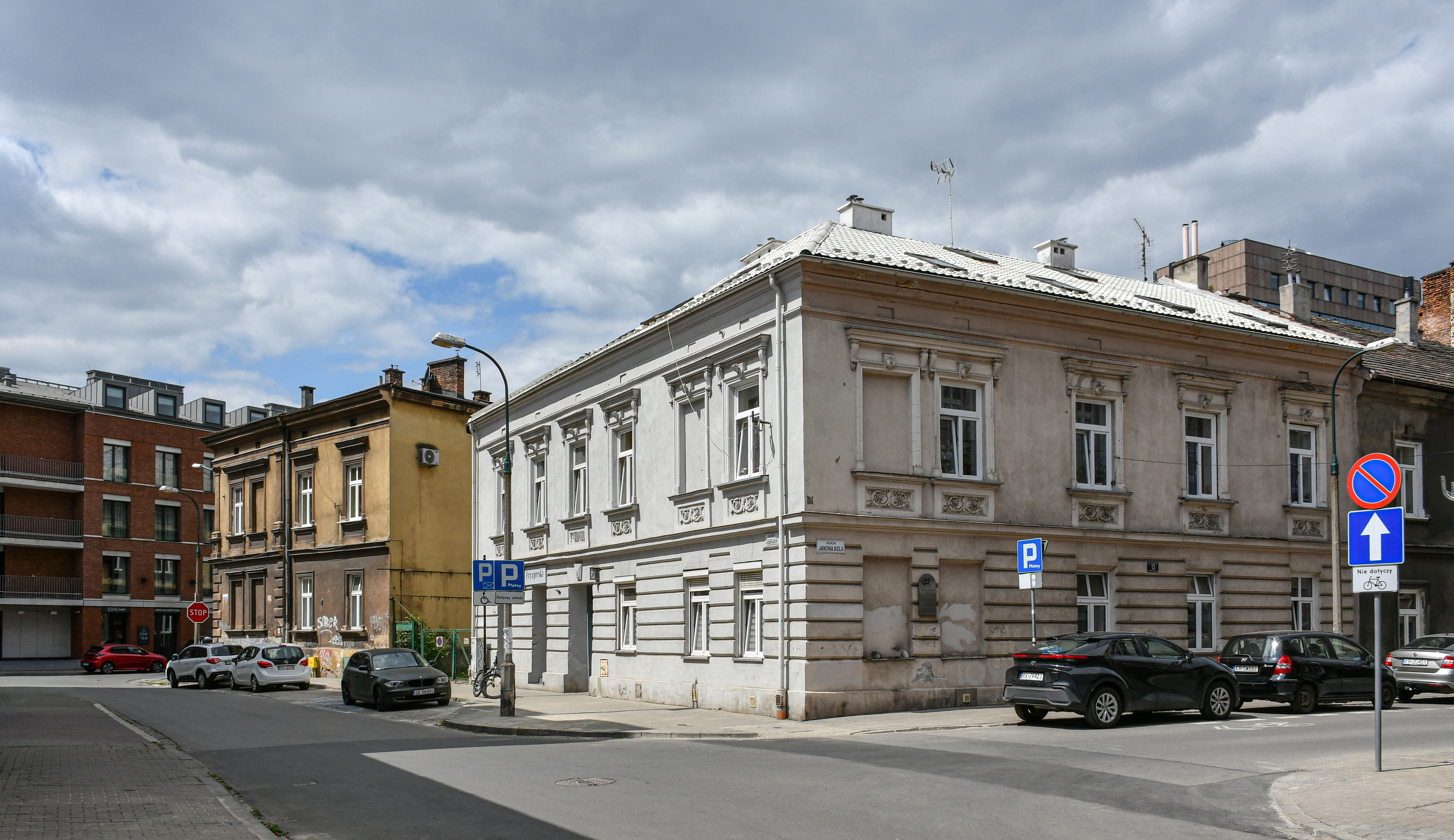
The Ghetto Memory Trail, the intersection of Dąbrówki and Janowa Wola streets. Here in 1942 the Germans murdered Abraham Neumann and Mordechai Gebirtig.

Mordechai Gebirtig (Polish: Markus Bertig Yiddish: מרדכי געבירטיג), born Mordecai Bertig (4 May 1877 – 4 June 1942), was an influential Polish Jewish poet and songwriter of the interwar period. He was shot by Germans in the Kraków Ghetto, occupied Poland, during the Holocaust. A number of his Yiddish songs are sung to this day, including Es brent, Reyzele, Moyshele Mayn Fraynd, and Kinder Yorn.

== Life ==
Mordechai Gebirtig was born in Kraków (Galicia and Lodomeria), and he lived his entire life in his Jewish quarter, Kazimierz. He served for five years in the Austro-Hungarian army. Gebirtig became a renowned folk artist in Yiddish literature and song while in Kraków. He was self-taught in music, played the shepherd's pipe, and tapped out tunes on the piano with one finger. He earned his livelihood as a furniture worker; while music and theatre were his avocations. His life ended in the Nazi shooting action carried out in the Kraków Ghetto on the infamous "Bloody Thursday" of June 4, 1942, along with the famed painter Abraham Neumann.

Gebirtig belonged to the Jewish Social Democratic Party, a political party in Galicia which merged into the Jewish Labour Bund after World War I. The Bund was a Yiddishist proletarian socialist party, which called for Jewish cultural autonomy in a democratic Second Republic.

== Music ==
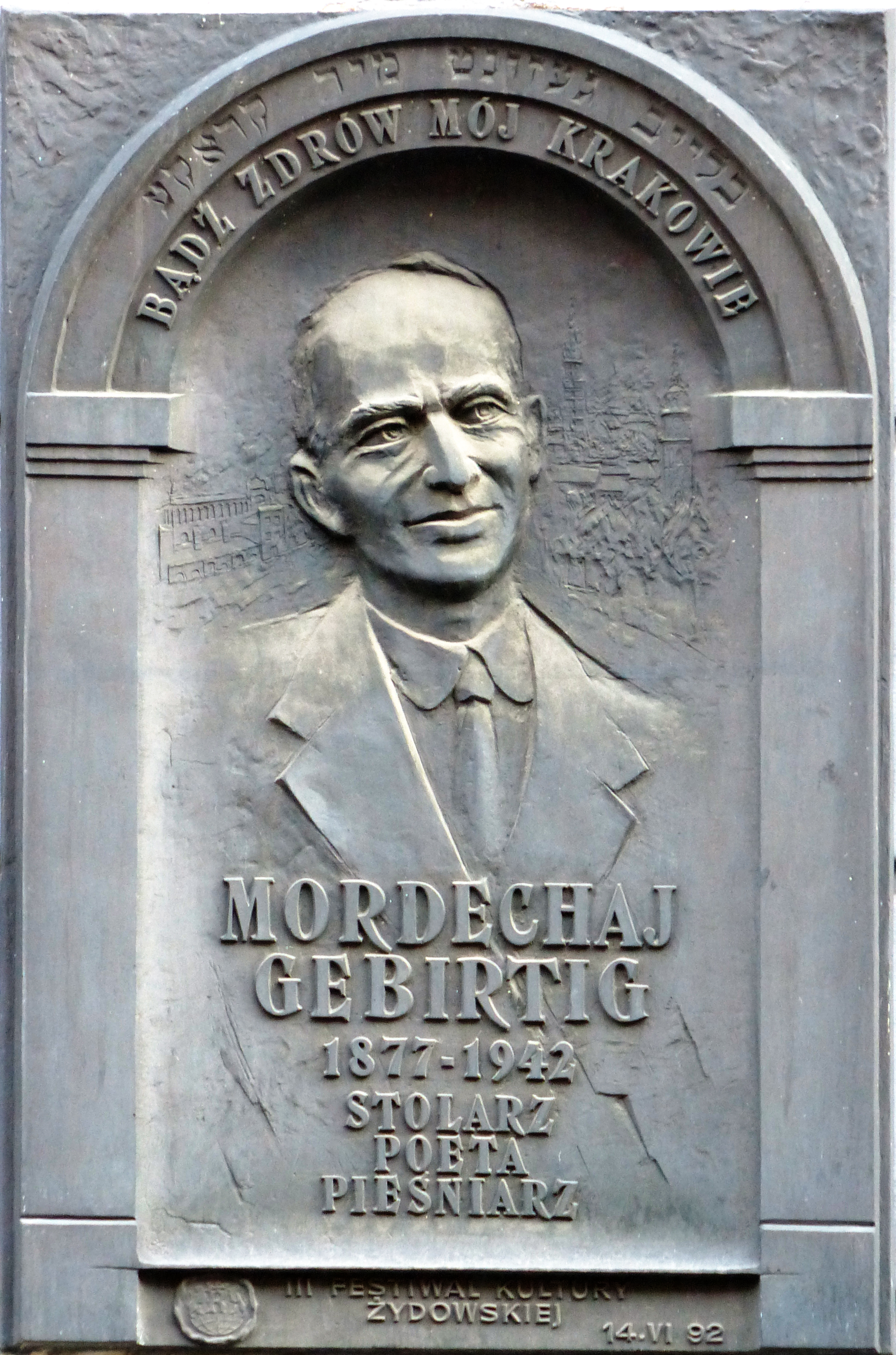
A commemorative plaque on the tenement house where he lived. Kraków, Kazimierz 5 Berka Joselewicza Street

From 1906 he was a member of the Jewish Amateur Troupe in Kraków. He also wrote songs and theater reviews for Der sotsial-demokrat, the Yiddish organ of the Jewish Social-Democratic Party. It was in such an environment that Gebirtig developed, encouraged by such professional writers and Yiddishist cultural activists as Avrom Reyzen, who for a time lived and published a journal in Krakow. Gebirtig's talent was his own, but he took the language, themes, types, tone, and timbre of his pieces from his surroundings, in some measure continuing the musical tradition of the popular Galician cabaret entertainers known as the Broder singers, who in turn were beholden to the yet older and still vital tradition of the badchen's (wedding jester's) improvisatory art.

== Style of folk songs ==
He published his first collection of songs in 1920, in the Second Polish Republic. It was titled Folkstimlekh ('of the folk'). His songs spread quickly even before they were published, and many people regarded them as folksongs whose author or authors were anonymous. Adopted by leading Yiddish players such as Molly Picon, Gebirtig's songs became staples of numerous regular as well as improvised theatrical productions wherever Yiddish theatre was performed. It is not an exaggeration to say that Gebirtig's songs were lovingly sung the world over.

=== S'brent ===
One of Gebirtig's best-known songs is "S'brent" (It is Burning), written in 1938 in response to the 1936 Przytyk pogrom in the shtetl (small town) of Przytyk. Gebirtig had hoped its message, “Don't stand there, brothers, douse the fire!” would be a call to action. Kraków (Cracow) underground Jewish resistance adopted S'brent as its anthem in World War II. "Undzer shtetl brennt" was sung in the Nazi ghettos of German-occupied Europe. Since then the song, in the original Yiddish and in its Hebrew translation titled "Ha-Ayyarah Bo'eret" (העיירה בוערת), "Our Little Town is Burning!" - hence the occasional reference to a Yiddish title, "Undzer Shtetl Brent!", continues to be widely performed in the context of Holocaust commemoration.

=== Arbetsloze marsh ===
One of Gebirtig's political songs that is also still popular today is the Arbetloze marsh or Song of the Unemployed:

Eynts, tsvey, dray, fir, arbetsloze zenen mir.
Nisht gehert khadoshim lang
in fabrik dem hamer klang,
s'lign keylim kalt fargesn,
s'nemt der zhaver zey shoyn fresn.
Geyen mir arum in gas,
vi di gvirim pust un pas.

Translation:

One, two, three, four, we are unemployed.
We have not heard all month long,
in the factory the hammer sound.
Tools lie cold, forgotten,
the rust is beginning to eat them.
While we go around on the streets,
like the rich, idle and aimless.

== Publications and recordings ==
- Gehat hob ich a hejm. Edition Künstlertreff, Wuppertal – ISBN 3-9803098-1-9 (gramophone record and booklet)
- Majn jowl. Edition Künstlertreff, Wuppertal – ISBN 3-9803098-3-5
- Der singer fun nojt. Edition Künstlertreff, Wuppertal – ISBN 3-9803098-2-7
- Farewell Cracow - Blayb gezunt mir, Kroke. Interpretiert von Bente Kahan. Studio Hard, Warschau (CD)
- 1946: S'brent. Krakau 1946
- 1949: Meine lider. Farl. Dawke, Paris 1949
- 1992: Jiddische Lieder. Wuppertal 1992. – ISBN 3-9803098-0-0
- 1997: Mai faifele: unbakante lider. Lerner, Tel Aviv 1997
- 2005: Shmutsige Magnaten. Anthony Coleman, piano. Tzadik, 2005

== Bibliography ==
- http://fcit.usf.edu/Holocaust/arts/musVicti.htm
- Papers of Mordecai Gebirtig at the YIVO, New York.
- http://holocaustmusic.ort.org/places/ghettos/krakow/gebirtigmordechai/
- https://web.archive.org/web/20110519162239/http://www.jewish-theatre.com/visitor/article_display.aspx?articleID=1901
- http://www.klezmershack.com/bands/vanoort/fayfele/vanoort.fayfele.html ( Mariejan van Oort & Jacques Verheijen produced 'Mayn Fayfele', a musical portrait of Gebirtig, 2003.)
- http://ulrich-greve.eu/free Free scores and song lyrics in Yiddish
