= Przytyk =

- Town
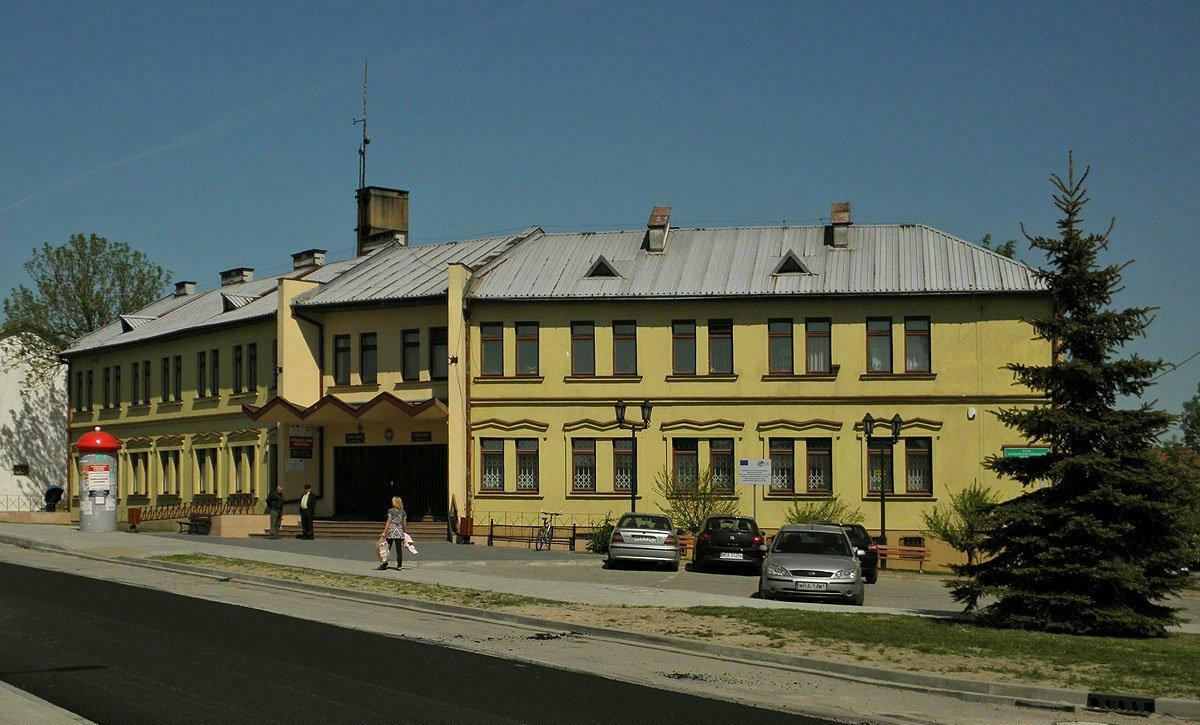
- Gmina Przytyk administration building

- Coat of arms

- Location within Poland
- Coordinates: 51°28′N 20°54′E
- Country: Poland
- Voivodeship: Masovian
- County: Radom
- Gmina: Przytyk

Population (2006)
  - Total: 990
- Time zone: UTC+1 (CET)
  - Summer (DST): UTC+2 (CEST)
- Vehicle registration: WRA
- Website: http://www.przytyk.pl/

Przytyk [ˈpʂɨtɨk] (Yiddish: פשיטיק) is a town in Radom County, Masovian Voivodeship, in east-central Poland, founded in the year 1333. It is the seat of the gmina (administrative district) called Gmina Przytyk.

== History ==
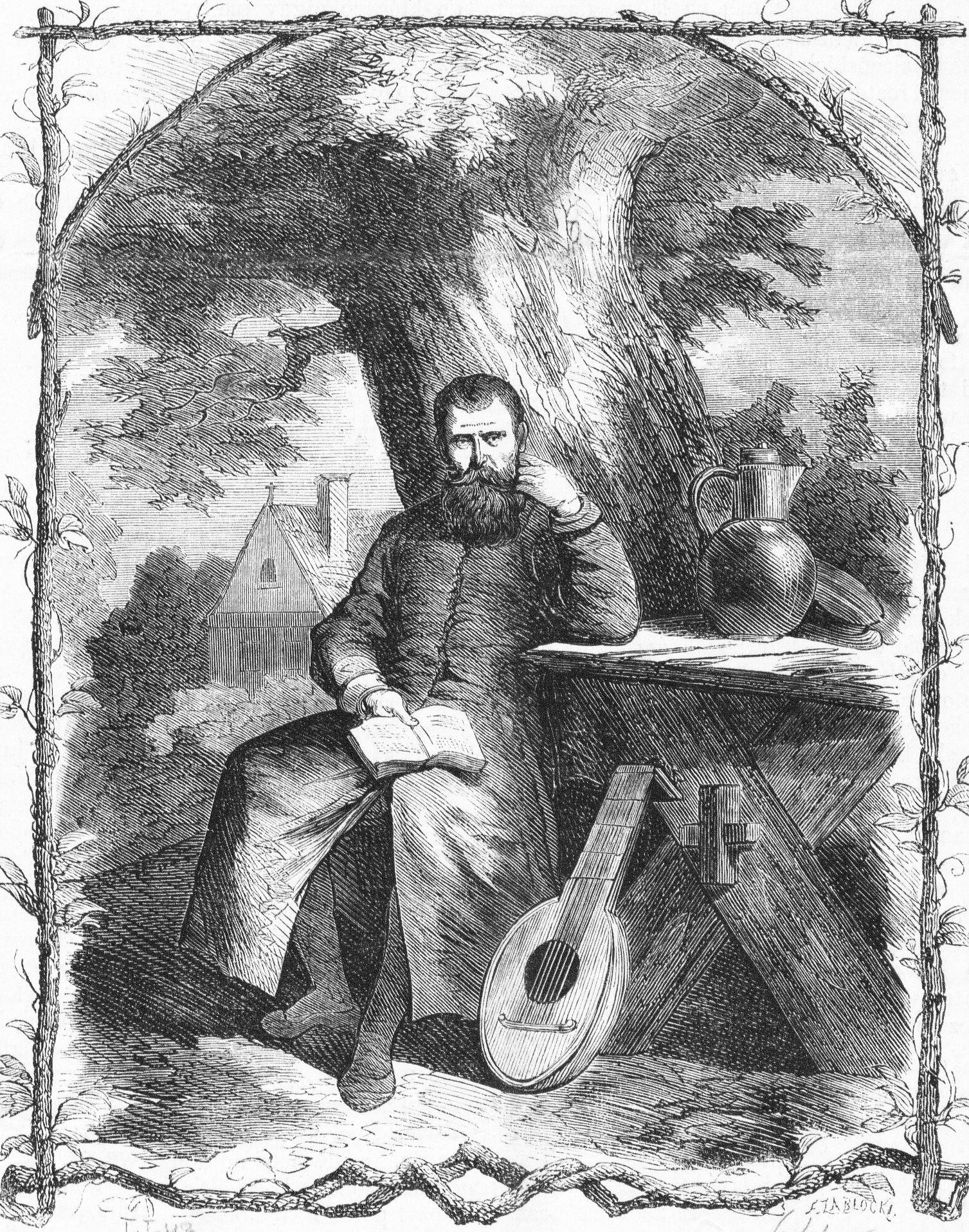
Poland's seminal poet Jan Kochanowski owned Przytyk since his 1570 marriage

In the late Middle Ages, the area of Przytyk belonged to the Podlodowski family (Janina coat of arms), whose seat was located at a village of Zameczek (also called Ostrow). The town of Przytyk was founded in 1333 by Piotr Podlodowski from Podlodów. In 1488, due to efforts of Jan Podlodowski, the castellan of Zarnowiec, King Kazimierz Jagiellonczyk granted to Przytyk the privilege to hold two fairs a year, and markets on Mondays. The tradition of Monday markets survives until this day. In 1570 a wedding of one of the most famous Polish poets, Jan Kochanowski, took place at Przytyk’s church. His wife was Dorota Podlodowska of Przytyk, and as a result of the marriage, the town became the property of the Kochanowski family. Przytyk remained in their hands until 1835, when the family lost it after the November Uprising. Przytyk was completely destroyed in the Swedish invasion of Poland (1655-1660). Administratively, Przytyk was located in the Radom County in the Sandomierz Voivodeship in the Lesser Poland Province. The town took advantage of a convenient location, at the intersection of two important merchant routes - the so-called Royal Trail (Warsaw - Kraków), and the Greater Poland Trail (Lublin - Poznań).

During the partitions period, after 1815, it formed part of Russian-controlled Congress Poland. A battle between Polish insurgents and Russian troops was fought in Przytyk on 11 August 1831 during the November Uprising. In 1834, the government opened a new road from Warsaw towards Kraków via Radom, which bypassed Przytyk. In 1869, as a punishment for the January Uprising, Przytyk lost its town charter. In 1895, the village was completely destroyed by a fire, leaving 4,000 inhabitants homeless. The one building not destroyed was the church.

=== 20th century ===
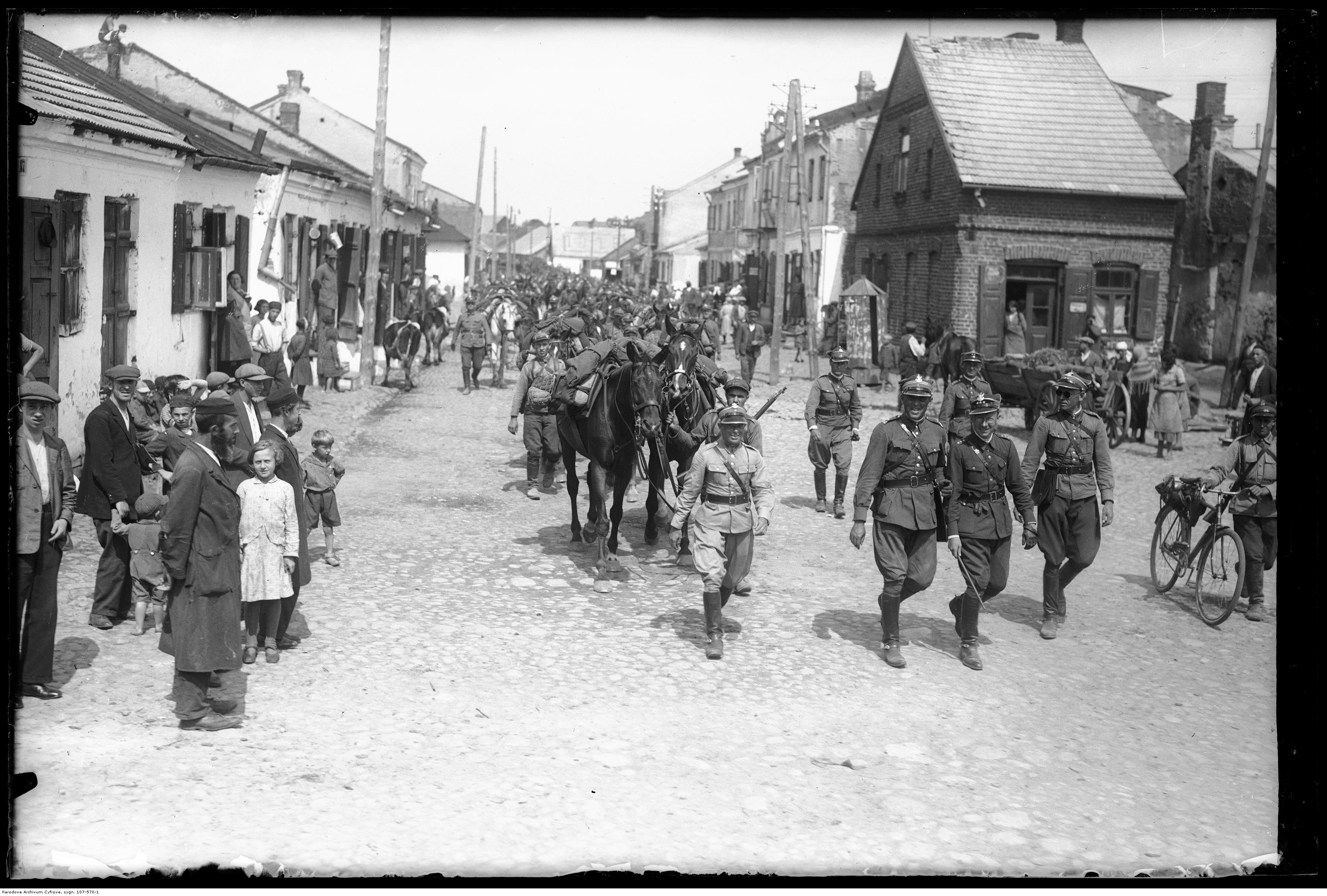
1st Mounted Rifle Regiment of the Polish Army in Przytyk in 1933

In the Second Polish Republic, following Poland's return to independence, Przytyk became an urban settlement in the Kielce Voivodeship with 2302 inhabitants in 1930, of whom 1852 (80 percent) were Jewish. The economy was almost entirely dominated by the Jewish craftsmen, tradesmen and farmers. The Jews owned and operated bakeries, slaughter houses, tailor shops, breweries, tobacco manufacturing plants, and groceries. Central markets were organized once a week, always on Mondays, drawing in crowds from nearby towns and villages. There was a power station in Przytyk, owned by Lejb Rozencwajg and two transportation companies, one owned by Pinkus Kornafel, and a second one owned by Moszek Rubinsztajn. There was also a Jewish-run credit union in the city. The competition for market share between Jews and a much smaller community of gentile Poles was intense, and the area was plagued by extreme poverty among both groups.

The town was the site of the 9 March 1936 Przytyk pogrom In spite of economic migration, prior to the invasion of Poland and the ensuing Holocaust, about 80 percent of the population remained Jewish. Most Jews of Przytyk were murdered in the Holocaust. In March 1941, Przytyk and the surrounding area was turned into a Luftwaffe training facility. All Polish residents were ordered to leave the town, and all buildings were destroyed by the Germans, except for the church. The destruction of the church was ordered on September 8, 1944, but this plan was halted due to lack of time. As a result, there are no other historic buildings in Przytyk. Two Polish policemen from Przytyk were murdered by the Russians in the Katyn massacre in 1940.

After German occupation ended, the town was restored to Poland, although with a Soviet-installed communist regime, which stayed in power until the Fall of Communism in the 1980s. In 1945–1947, the Polish anti-communist resistance carried out three raids of the local communist police station, and on 18 June 1949, a battle between the resistance and forces of the communist Ministry of Public Security was fought nearby.

== Transport ==
Przytyk lies on the intersection of vovoideship roads 740 and 732.

The nearest railway station is in Radom.
