= Nir Nakav =

Israeli drummer

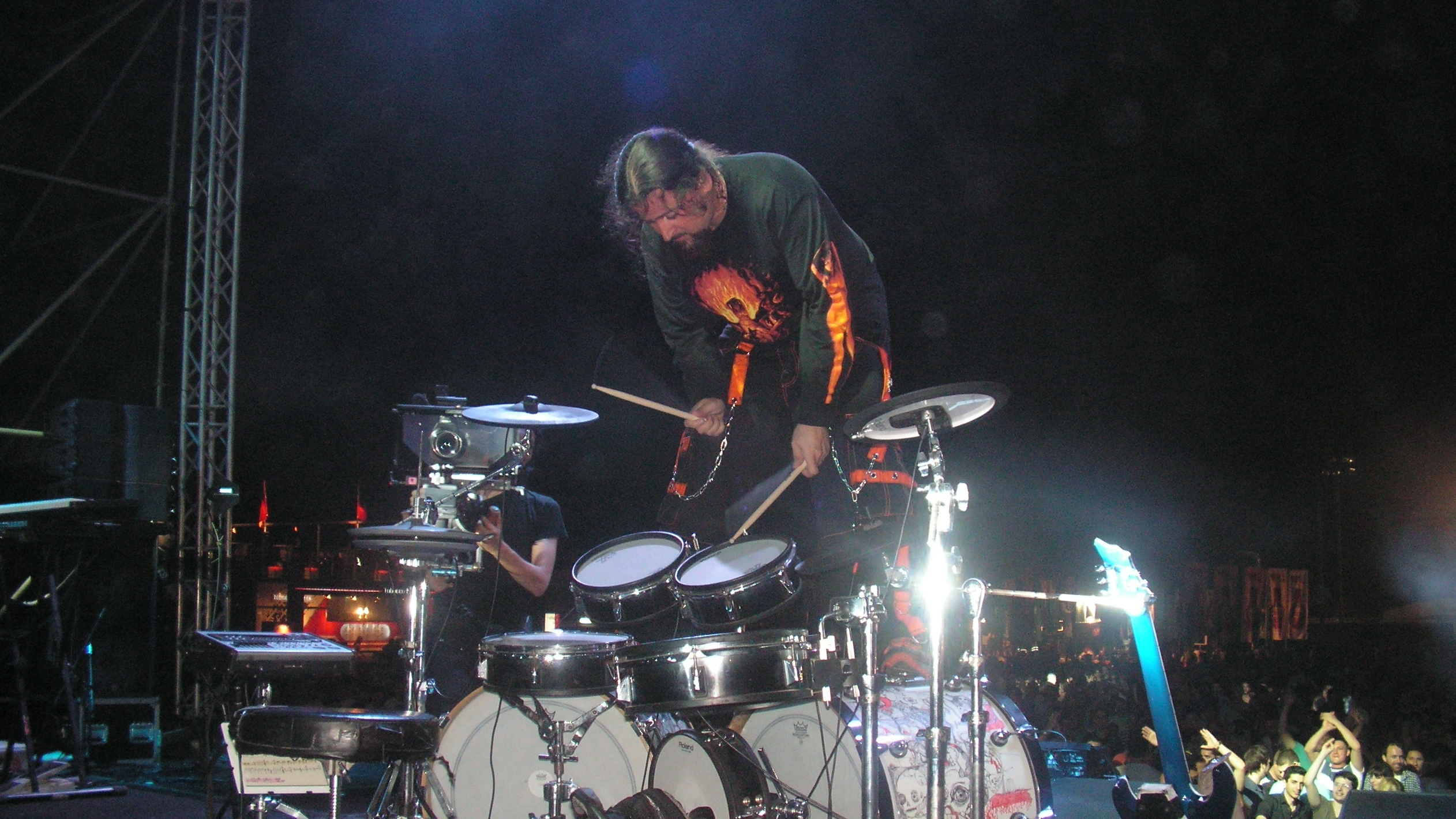
- Nir Nakav in a concert with Infected Mushroom

Background information
- Born: February 29th, 1972; Jaffa, Israel
- Origin: Israel
- Occupation(s): Musician, Drummer
- Instrument: Drums
- Website: www.nirnakav.com

Nir Nakav (Hebrew: ניר נקב) is an Israeli drummer. He is the head of the drums department in Rimon School of Jazz and Contemporary Music in Israel. Since 1998 he is the drummer of the extreme metal band Salem. Nakav is a graduate of Musicians Institute (MI) college in Hollywood, California. Nakav authored an educational textbook for drummers, titled "Battle Hymns".
