= Salem (Israeli band) =

Israeli extreme metal band

- Origin: Giv'atayim, Israel
- Genres: Oriental metal; death metal; doom metal; gothic metal; black metal (early)
- Years active: 1985–present
- Labels: KMG; System Shock; Season of Mist; Pulverised
- Members: Ze'ev Tananboim; Lior Mizrachi; Nir Gutraiman; David Cohen; Nir Nakav
- Past members: Beny Robinov; Giora Hirsch; Beny Cohen; Michael Goldstein; Yossi Mankovizki; Oded Shahar; Danny Mondani; Yair Benjy; Amir Neubach
- Website: salemband.com

Salem is an Israeli extreme metal band, pioneers of the oriental metal movement and of the Israeli heavy metal scene in general. Much of their lyrics and music deals with political issues concerning the Jewish people and Israel, most notably the concept albums Kaddish (1994) and Collective Demise (2002).

== History ==
Salem, the first extreme metal band in Israel, was formed in 1985, under the name Axe Metal, and is thus one of the first bands in the worldwide underground metal scene to play black metal. This can be heard in their self-titled rehearsal tape from 1986 and their live demo Destruction Till Death from 1987, recorded at the 'Penguin' club, the only outlet for alternative music in Israel throughout the 1980s. This formula was later honed by bands such as Beherit and Blasphemy in the early 1990s.

After five years underground, the band released another live demo, Millions Slaughtered (1990), with a new line-up and a genre shift towards the death/doom realms. This demo sold 1,500 copies and led to a record deal with the German label Morbid Records. In the film Global Metal, drummer Nir Nakav recounted a story relating to the demotape that somehow ended up in the hands of the Norwegian Varg Vikernes, who contacted the band and noted that while he appreciated the music, he loathed the anti-Holocaust lyrics and wished the band to perish in the Gulf War. The band, infuriated, replied with a strongly worded letter; a few days later the band was contacted by local police, who had found a bomb in the mail from Norway. The band's official website describes this story in the following manner: "SALEM was formed in 1985 along with the newly born extreme metal scene and released 2 demo tapes called: "Salem"(1986) and "Destruction till Death" (1987). Back than, SALEM were in very good relations with Mayhem's founder Euronymous who offered SALEM relocation to Norway and joining the black metal inner circle. Varg Vikernes of Burzum who disliked the band's ideals thought differently and sent to vocalist Ze'ev Tananboim an explosive envelope by mail."

Creating Our Sins (1992) and Kaddish (1994) were released by Morbid Records and became the first metal albums from Israel to gain worldwide success. Kaddish is a concept album about the Holocaust. Prior to its release, Morbid Records released a 7" picture EP with the single "Dying Embers" (1994) to promote the album, and when Kaddish came out, a limited edition picture disc was released. The opening song, "The Fading," was played on MTV's Headbanger's Balls rotation and had the band elected as one of the 10 best up-and-coming bands in the world by MTV and Kerrang!.

Kaddish also featured a cover song in Hebrew called "Ha'ayara Bo'eret" ("the small town is burning"). The song was originally a poem written in Yiddish under the name "S'brent" ("it is burning") by Polish-Jewish poet Mordechai Gebirtig in 1938, in response to the 1936 pogrom of Jews in the town of Przytyk near Radom. It was since translated into Hebrew, long before the band performed it. National controversy led to the Israeli parliament discussing whether it was appropriate for a metal band to play such songs.

In 1998, now with Israeli label B.N.E., the band enlisted producer Colin Richardson (Machine Head, Fear Factory), who flew over to Israel to record A Moment of Silence. The album was recorded in D.B. studios in Israel and The Chapel in England and was released late 1998. A big distribution deal with Modern Music (Germany) fell through due to miscommunication between B.N.E. and Salem.

In early 2001, Salem was released from their contract with B.N.E. In December 2001, Salem signed a three-album deal with KMG/System Shock from Germany. Their fourth album, Collective Demise, was released in September 2002, the most aggressive Salem album to date, produced by the band and recorded in D.B. Studios and Noise Studios in Israel. Most of the songs deal with the second Intifada.

In 2005 Salem released Strings Attached, 11 previously recorded songs now re-recorded with added string instruments. The album was also released as a special edition with a bonus CD, including four live performances from the Live Demise DVD, which was shot in July 2006.

Salem's sixth studio album was Necessary Evil. It included a 27-minute-long piece, "Once Upon a Lifetime Parts I – V", and a short protest song called "Amona", dealing with the 2005 events in Amona. The album was released in June 2007. That month the band performed for the first time ever outside of Israel, during the Hellfest festival in Clisson, France.

On 11 December 2009, it was announced that Salem was signed by Pulverised Records to release their upcoming seventh studio album Playing God and Other Short Stories on 3 April 2010 in Israel, 26 April 2010 in Europe and 25 May 2010 in the US.

On 6 May 2011, the band celebrated the re-release of their classic album Kadish, playing a special show at the Reading 3 club in Tel Aviv, where they were joined for most of the show by Guns N' Roses guitarist Ron "Bumblefoot" Thal.

On 29 July 2019, Michael Goldstein, the band's former long-time bassist died while residing in the United States. On 7 December 2019, the band held a fundraising concert to help cover for the medical bills which mounted leading up to Goldstein's death. The concert was held at the Gagarin club in Tel Aviv. Founding members of Orphaned Land, Kobi Farhi and Uri Zelha, joined Salem on stage as Zelha, Orphaned Land's bassist, played bass for Salem for the entire show. Other bands who played during the fundraising concert were Spawn of Evil, Arallu, Tomorrow's Rain and Shredhead.

== Musical style ==
Salem's music is a combination of doom/death metal (slow-paced death metal) with oriental elements and high-pitched screaming-vocals (distorted hoarse screams). Riffing, henceforth, can range from slow and heavy doom metal riffing to very fast and rapid death metal riffing. This sound evolved from Salem's original style (first two demos), which was old-school black metal. Salem's latest two studio albums are much heavier than their former LPs.

In some songs, Salem uses oriental (Jewish and Middle-eastern) melodies, such as "Act of Terror", "Al Taster", and the intro for "Ha'ayara Bo'eret". In Collective Demise, female vocals were combined with Tananboim's singing.

Salem has thus far recorded two songs in Hebrew: Mordechai Gebirtig's "Ha'ayara Boe'ret," and "Al Taster", taken from Psalms. These along with some Orphaned Land songs are among the few extreme metal songs sung in Hebrew.

== Band members ==
Current

- Ze'ev Tananboim – lead vocals (1985–present)
- Lior Mizrachi (Afifit) – guitar (1988–present)
- Nir Nakav – drums, percussion (1998–present)
- Nir Gutraiman – guitar (2001–present)
- David Cohen – bass (2013–present)

Former

- Beny Robinov – guitar (1985–1988)
- Giora Hirsch – guitar (1990–1996)
- Beny Cohen – bass (1985–1988)
- Michael Goldstein – bass (1988–2013), guitar (1985–1988)
- Yossi Mankovizki – drums, percussion (1985)
- Oded Shahar – drums, percussion (1985)
- Danny Mondani – drums, percussion (1985–1988)
- Yair Benjy – drums, percussion (1988–1990)
- Amir Neubach – drums, percussion (1990–1998)

Timeline

== Discography ==
=== Albums ===
- Creating Our Sins 1992
- Kaddish 1994
- A Moment of Silence 1998
- Collective Demise 2002
- Strings Attached 2005
- Necessary Evil 2007
- Playing God and Other Short Stories 2010

=== Demos ===
- Salem 1986
- Destruction Till Death 1987
- Millions Slaughtered 1990

=== EPs ===
- Dying Embers 1994

=== DVDs ===
- Live Demise 2006
- Salem Underground 2007
