= Oi Va Voi (album) =

Studio album by Oi Va Voi
- Released: 9 July 2007
- Genre: Alternative
- Length: 40:45
- Label: V2
- Producer: Mike Spencer

Oi Va Voi chronology
Laughter Through Tears (2003)	Oi Va Voi (2007)	Travelling the Face of the Globe (2009)

Professional ratings
Review scores
Source	Rating
Drowned in Sound	2/10
The Guardian	3/5 stars

Oi Va Voi is a studio album by the English, London-based, experimental band Oi Va Voi, released in 2007.

== Critical reception ==
AllMusic wrote that the album "saw Oi Va Voi embracing their peculiarities and creating a swirling mix of rock music, soulful electronica, and world music influences." The Guardian wrote that the band "excel here at everything from an Air-style 'kitsch space song' about Yuri Gagarin via skittering beats, Arabic strings and Jewish klezmer to the sensitive 'Dry Your Eyes.'" Drowned in Sound called it "an astoundingly bland, wearingly tedious long-player, with precious little to recommend it."

== Track listing ==
No.	Title	Length
1.	"Yuri"	4:33
2.	"Further Deeper"	5:45
3.	"Look Down"	5:18
4.	"Dissident"	4:01
5.	"Balkanik"	3:54
6.	"Black Sheep"	4:54
7.	"Nosim"	1:00
8.	"Dry Your Eyes"	4:47
9.	"Worry Lines"	4:29
10.	"Spirit of Bulgaria"	2:09

== Personnel ==
- Alice McLaughlin – lead vocals
- Lemez Lovas – lyrics, arrangement, trumpet, vocals
- Nik Ammar – guitar
- Josh Breslaw – drums
- Stephen Levi – clarinet
- Leo Bryant – bass
- Anna Phoebe – violin
