= Ági Szalóki =

Hungarian singer (born 1978)

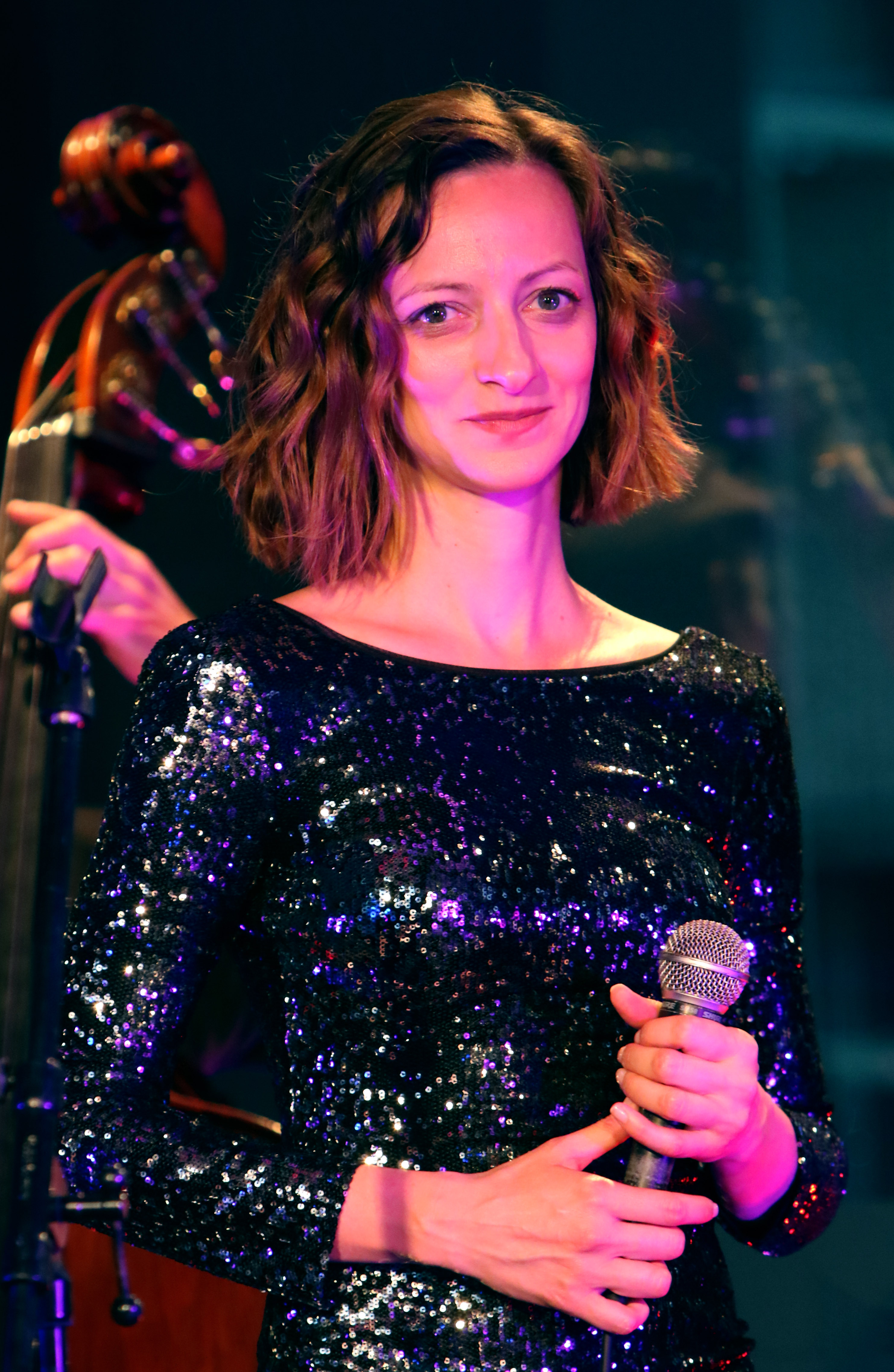
- Ági Szalóki in 2016

Background information
- Born: Ágnes Szalóki; October 17, 1978 (age 48)
- Origin: Budapest, Hungary
- Genres: Folklore, world music, jazz, electro-pop
- Occupation: Singer
- Instrument: Vocals
- Years active: 1996–present
- Labels: Hangvető, Folk Europa Records, Periferic Records
- Spouse: Julián Fábián

Ági Szalóki (born October 17, 1978) is a Hungarian folk singer. She has performed internationally with world music and folk revival bands, including Besh o droM and Ökrös.

== Career ==
Szalóki began singing as a toddler, reportedly drawing inspiration from Márta Sebestyén. She first gained recognition for her performances with Ökrös, where she sang in a traditional folk style, and later with Besh o droM, a Balkan gypsy brass band. In 2005, Szalóki began a solo career exploring various genres, such as jazz, 1930s ballads, and children's music. She has performed worldwide, including at the Montreal Jazz Festival, the Glastonbury Festival, the Théâtre de la Ville in Paris, in New York, and in Beijing.

Szalóki is trained in the Kodály method.

== Health ==
In 2015, Szalóki was diagnosed with hypothyroidism, but the effects have been largely mitigated by medical treatment.

== Discography ==
=== Solo albums ===
- Téli-nyári laboda (2004)
- Hallgató (2005)
- Cipity Lőrinc (2006)
- A vágy muzsikál (2008)
- Gingalló (2009)
- Kishúg (2010)
- Öröme az égnek, ünnepe a földnek (2012)
- Körforgás (2014)
- Fújnak a fellegek (2017)
- Zümmögő idő (2023)
- Utazásaim (2024)

=== Other appearances ===
- Korom Attila - Hajnali
- Ökrös - Bonchida, háromszor
- Kalotaszegi népzene - Neti Sanyi és Kicsi Aladár
- Besh o drom - Macsó hímzés
- Triton - Indulj el
- Karácsonynak éjszakáján
- Balkan Syndicate - Nikola
- Makám - Anzix
- Besh o drom - Gyí!
- Balázs Elemér Group - MagyarNeépdalok
- Balogh Kálmán - Karácsonyi örömzene
- Amikor én még kissrác voltam - Tisztelgés az Illés zenekar előtt
- Besh o drom - Ha megfogom az ördögöt
- Tony Lakatos - Gipsy Colours
- Kiss Feri - Szerelemajtók
- Ajándék - Roma művészek a gyerekekért
- Balogh Kálmán és a Gipsy Cimbalom Band - Aven Shavale
- OiVaVoi
- Szabó Dániel - Egetverő
- Budapest Bár
- Szájról szájra
- Bognár Szilvia - Semmicske énekek
- Sárkány apó
- "volt egyszer volt egy kis zsidó"
- Kozma Orsi Quartet - Hide And Seek

== Awards ==
- Fonogram Prize (2006 – for Hallgató / Lament, 2007 – for Cipity Lőrinc, 2010 – for Gingalló)
- 2006 – Artisjus Artistic Prize
- 2006 – Andás Bozóki, Minister of Culture, lauded Szalóki for her work in children's songs and world music genres
- 2007 – Zoltán Kodály Memorial Prize
- 2009 – March Youths Award (State award)
- 2010 – Sanoma and Story Magazine Value Award
