= Necessary Evil (Salem album) =

Studio album by Salem
- Released: June 19, 2007
- Genre: Death metal, oriental metal
- Label: Season of Mist

Salem chronology
Strings Attached (2005)	Necessary Evil (2007)	Playing God and Other Short Stories (2010)

Professional ratings
Review scores
Source	Rating
Metal Temple	4/5 stars

Necessary Evil is the sixth studio album by Israeli death metal band Salem, released on June 19, 2007.

The album includes the band's longest music piece, "Once Upon a Lifetime", which lasts more than 20 minutes, although it is divided into five parts in the album.

== Track listing ==
No.	Title	Length
1.	"Blood"	4:11
2.	"Amona"	2:20
3.	"Idol Worship"	5:33
4.	"Mindless"	4:38
5.	"Hypatia"	5:37
6.	"Strife"	4:50
7.	"Resentment"	3:54
8.	"Making a Difference"	4:18
9.	"More Blood" (Instrumental)	0:58
10.	"Once Upon a Lifetime Part 1"	5:26
11.	"Once Upon a Lifetime Part 2"	5:00
12.	"Once Upon a Lifetime Part 3"	5:19
13.	"Once Upon a Lifetime Part 4"	8:09
14.	"Once Upon a Lifetime Part 5"	2:09

Tracks 1–9 are by Salem & Nir Nakav. Tracks 10–14 are by Nir Nakav.

== Personnel ==
- Ze'ev Tananboim - lead vocals
- Lior Mizrachi - guitar
- Nir Gutraiman - guitar
- Michael Goldstein - bass
- Nir Nakav - drums, percussion
