= Speak for Yourself =

Studio album by Imogen Heap
- Released: 18 July 2005
- Recorded: 2004
- Length: 49:27
- Labels: Megaphonic; RCA Victor; Sony Legacy; White Rabbit
- Producer: Imogen Heap

Imogen Heap chronology
Details (2002)	Speak for Yourself (2005)	Ellipse (2009)

Singles from Speak for Yourself
- 1. "Hide and Seek" Released: 19 May 2005; 2. "Goodnight and Go" Released: 26 April 2006; 3. "Headlock" Released: 2 October 2006

Speak for Yourself is the second solo album by the English singer Imogen Heap. It was released on 18 July 2005 in the United States. The album was written, produced, arranged, and funded by Heap, without the backing of a record label, and features guest appearances from Jeff Beck, who provides a guitar solo on "Goodnight and Go", and by Heap's ex-boyfriend, Richie Mills, who argues with her on "The Moment I Said It". Heap began working on Speak for Yourself following her collaborative effort with Guy Sigsworth as Frou Frou.

Speak for Yourself was re-released on 24 December 2012, by Sony Music, with additional deluxe and instrumental editions. It was remastered and re-released on 17 October 2025 at higher audio quality to celebrate the album's 20th anniversary.

== Background and development ==
Heap recorded Speak for Yourself between her 26th and 27th birthdays, from December 2003 to December 2004. While recording the album, Heap kept a graph on which she had the keys of songs on the X axis and the tempos of songs on the Y axis so as to prevent herself from repeating song structures. The album was primarily recorded in her flat in Bermondsey, London. "I Am in Love with You" was written by Heap at age 19 while she was on tour with Rufus Wainwright, while "Clear the Area" was the first song on the album to be fully written. The song "Daylight Robbery" was written for an advertising agency.

The album's cover was created by Heap's boyfriend at the time, who had been editing a photo of her taken by a friend in Los Angeles, while the title was based on the name of a file folder which she would keep only her individual work in, away from all the files with her collaborators.

Speak for Yourself was released in the United States in 2005, and released in the UK through Imogen Heap's label, Megaphonic Records, in a digipak created specifically by Heap, before being licensed to White Rabbit Recordings in 2006 for the UK and international markets. It is licensed to RCA and Sony Legacy in the US, where the first run of 10,000 copies were copy protected and encased in the digipak. As of August 2009, it has sold 431,000 copies in the US according to Nielsen SoundScan. The album has also achieved Gold status in Canada. The album has sold 39,000 copies in the United Kingdom. Songs "Hide and Seek", "Speeding Cars" and "Goodnight and Go" have sold 647,000, 223,000 and 159,000 copies in the United States, respectively. "Speeding Cars" and "Can't Take It In" were not present on most releases except for in Japan.

Speak for Yourself was re-released digitally in deluxe, standard, and instrumental editions on 24 December 2012, by Sony Music.

== Critical reception ==
Professional ratings
Review scores
Source	Rating
About.com	5/5 stars
AllMusic	4/5 stars
Drowned in Sound	8/10
Entertainment Weekly	B+
Pitchfork	6.4/10
PopMatters	6/10

Speak for Yourself received generally positive reviews from music critics. A reviewer from About.com gave the album a perfect score, describing it as "a roller coaster ride of beauty and head pounding intensity." Conversely, David Raposa of Pitchfork opined that "the results of this musical terraforming are at once both gorgeous and bland."

=== Accolades ===
NPR's Ned Wharton named Speak for Yourself one of the best albums of 2005. Also for NPR, American radio presenter Nic Harcourt named "Have You Got It in You?" one of the best songs of 2005.

== Commercial performance ==
The album was certified platinum for a million equivalent sales in the United States, with a gold certification in the Canada.

Despite Speak for Yourself being Imogen Heap's best selling album now, it had the weakest start in comparison to all of her other albums (except I Megaphone). Speak for Yourself debuted at number 182 on the Billboard 200 chart, however, the album peaked at number 145 around 3 months later. Speak for Yourself was also particularly successful on the Billboard Top Dance Albums chart, peaking at number 2 and spending a total of one hundred and thirty-eight weeks on the chart. She would later top this chart with her next two albums, Ellipse and Sparks.

The three singles, "Hide and Seek", "Goodnight and Go" and "Headlock" all performed well. "Hide and Seek", the lead single, was certified Gold in the United States. "Hide and Seek" gained additional attention after being featured in the TV show The O.C. "Hide and Seek"'s longevity and fame were also increased due to being sampled in Jason Derulo's number 1 hit "Whatcha Say".

"Goodnight and Go", the second single of the album, debuted at number 56 on the Official Singles chart and achieved similar success. "Headlock", the third and final single of the album, debuted at number 74 on the Official Singles chart, but peaked at number 30 nearly 20 years after release due to a resurgence. This also made "Headlock" enter the Hot 100 chart and peak at number 82, spending a total of twelve weeks on the chart. "Headlock" is certified Platinum in the United States with 1 million units sold. "Headlock" is Heap's most successful single in terms of streaming.

== Track listing ==
All tracks are written by Imogen Heap.

Standard edition
No.	Title	Length
1.	"Headlock"	3:36
2.	"Goodnight and Go"	3:52
3.	"Have You Got It in You?"	4:10
4.	"Loose Ends"	3:40
5.	"Hide and Seek"	4:28
6.	"Clear the Area"	4:14
7.	"Daylight Robbery"	3:21
8.	"The Walk"	5:14
9.	"Just for Now"	3:00
10.	"I Am in Love with You"	3:08
11.	"Closing In"	4:48
12.	"The Moment I Said It"	5:56
Total length:		49:27

Japanese bonus tracks
No.	Title	Length
13.	"Speeding Cars"	3:32
14.	"Can't Take It In"	4:43
Total length:		57:42

Deluxe edition bonus tracks
No.	Title	Length
13.	"Headlock" (instrumental)	3:34
14.	"Goodnight and Go" (instrumental)	3:54
15.	"Have You Got It in You?" (instrumental)	4:08
16.	"Loose Ends" (instrumental)	3:39
17.	"Cumulus" (B-side to "Hide and Seek")	4:43
18.	"Clear the Area" (instrumental)	4:13
19.	"Daylight Robbery" (instrumental)	3:23
20.	"The Walk" (instrumental)	5:15
21.	"Just for Now" (instrumental)	2:54
22.	"I Am in Love with You" (instrumental)	3:06
23.	"Closing In" (instrumental)	4:48
24.	"The Moment I Said It" (instrumental)	5:54
Total length:		1:38:58

== Charts ==
=== Weekly charts ===
Weekly chart performance for Speak for Yourself
Chart (2005–2007)	Peak position
US Billboard 200	145
US Top Dance Albums (Billboard)	2
US Heatseekers Albums (Billboard)	1

=== Year-end charts ===
2006 year-end chart performance for Speak for Yourself
Chart (2006)	Position
US Top Dance/Electronic Albums (Billboard)	6

2007 year-end chart performance for Speak for Yourself
Chart (2007)	Position
US Top Dance/Electronic Albums (Billboard)	2

2025 year-end chart performance for Speak for Yourself
Chart (2025)	Position
US Top Dance Albums (Billboard)	18

== Certifications ==
Certifications for Speak for Yourself
Region	Certification	Certified units/sales
Canada (Music Canada)	Gold	50,000^{^}
United States (RIAA)	Platinum	1,000,000^{‡}
^{^} Shipments figures based on certification alone.^{‡} Sales+streaming figures based on certification alone.

== Personnel ==
Credits adapted from Tidal and album liner notes.

- Imogen Heap – vocals, production, mixing, engineering, programming
- Richie Mills – background vocals (1, 12), drums (3–4, 7, 11)
- Mich Gerber – double bass (1, 3)
- Jeff Beck – electric guitar (2)
- Arve Henriksen – trumpet (6, 10)
- Leo Abrahams – guitar (8)

== Release history ==
Region	Date	Version
United States	18 July 2005	Standard version
Canada	17 April 2006	Standard version
Mexico	17 April 2006	Standard version
United Kingdom	17 April 2006	Standard version
Japan	21 March 2007	Standard version
Various	24 December 2012	Deluxe version
Various	17 October 2025	20th anniversary remaster

== 20th anniversary remaster ==
On 18 July 2025, Heap teased a re-master project by releasing "Hide and Seek" with high bit-rate audio to deliver higher sound quality and Dolby Atmos support. On 17 October, the album was re-released on all streaming platforms.
