= Headlock (song) =

Single by Imogen Heap

from the album Speak for Yourself
- B-side: "Mic Check"
- Released: 2 October 2006
- Recorded: 2003
- Genre: Electropop
- Length: 3:36 (album version); 3:13 (Immi's Radio Mix)
- Label: White Rabbit
- Songwriter: Imogen Heap
- Producer: Imogen Heap

Imogen Heap singles chronology
"Goodnight and Go" (2006)	"Headlock" (2006)	"Not Now But Soon" (2008)

Music video
- "Headlock" on YouTube

"Headlock" is a song by English singer-songwriter Imogen Heap. It was released on 16 October 2006 through White Rabbit, a Sony BMG sublabel, as the third single from Heap's second studio album, Speak for Yourself (2005), following "Hide and Seek" and "Goodnight and Go". A rhythmic electropop song, it received critical praise upon its release.

The single initially debuted at number 74 on the UK Singles Chart in 2006, and, in 2025, peaked at number 30 on the chart and became her first song to appear on the Billboard Hot 100 after it went viral on TikTok due to its association with the video game Mouthwashing.

== Release and composition ==
After appearing on Imogen Heap's second studio album Speak for Yourself, which was independently released by her in July 2005, "Headlock" was released as a single on 16 October 2006 through White Rabbit, a sublabel of Sony BMG run by Nick Raphael that later merged into Epic Records UK in 2007. The single included a radio edit of the song, while its B-side is a remix of the song by High Contrast.

Heap wrote and produced "Headlock", which was inspired by the song "Funiculaire" by Readymade. It is a rhythmic electropop song that runs for slightly over three minutes. Heap sings with a "breathy" vocal over synthesizers, harp, and drums, and the song builds up to what Nick Hyman of Under the Radar described as a "boisterous synth beat explosion". John D. Luerssen, for AllMusic, called it one of the "rhythm-fueled", "experimental numbers" from Speak for Yourself. For NPR's Morning Edition, Stephen Thompson detailed the song's vibe as "unsettling" and "futuristic".

== Reception and commercial performance ==
David Renshaw of Gigwise gave "Headlock" four out of five stars, writing that it was "a fantastically quirky pop song" and praising it for its "twists, turns and slides". In a review of Speak for Yourself for Under the Radar, Nick Hyman wrote that "Headlock" "sets the tone fantastically" for Speak for Yourself. Luerssen of AllMusic wrote that "Headlock" was one of the album's songs that "suggest[s] Heap has written and produced the finest electro/alt rock CD of 2005". In a 2012 YouGov survey of more than five thousand of Heap's fans, 26 percent named "Headlock" as their favourite song of Heap's, making it her fourth most-favoured song by fans at the time after "Hide and Seek", "Let Go" by Frou Frou, and "Goodnight and Go".

"Headlock" debuted at number 74 on the UK Singles Chart for the week dated 22 October 2006. Upon its release, Heap requested to have it added to BBC Radio 1's rotation, but was told by the station that, since they already had Nerina Pallot on their playlist, they did not need another female singer-songwriter. "Headlock" became popular on TikTok starting in October 2024, initially due to its use in video tributes to the horror video game Mouthwashing. It had been used in more than 135 thousand videos on the platform by January 2025. Michael Savage of The Guardian also attributed its success to an increase in nostalgia for music and television series from the 2000s on the platform. That month, due to its increased popularity on streaming services, it became Heap's first career entry on the Billboard Hot 100 chart, debuting at number 100, and debuted on the Canadian Hot 100, also at number 100. It became her highest-charting and first top-40 entry on the UK Singles Chart, peaking at number 30 in February 2025.

== Other appearances ==
"Headlock" was sampled on ASAP Rocky's song "Angels" from his 2013 studio album Long. Live. ASAP, on English rapper Fakemink's song "Kill Everything" from his 2023 debut mixtape London's Saviour, and on Australian hip-hop group Onefour's 2025 single "Distant Strangers", which also featured The Kid Laroi and was included on the group's debut studio album Look at Me Now. In April 2025, in a collaboration with the generative AI company Jen, Heap released a "stylefilter" for "Headlock", among other songs of hers, which allows users to generate a song in the style of "Headlock".

== Track listings ==
CD single and 7" vinyl

1. Headlock (Immi's radio mix) – 3:13
2. Mic Check – 4:35

Promo vinyl & CD

1. Headlock (Immi's radio edit) – 3:16
2. Headlock (High Contrast remix) (edit) – 3:25

== Charts ==
=== Weekly charts ===
2006 weekly chart performance for "Headlock"
Chart (2006)	Peak position
UK Singles (Official Charts)	74

2024–2025 weekly chart performance for "Headlock"
Chart (2024–2025)	Peak position
Canada Hot 100 (Billboard)	72
Global 200 (Billboard)	97
Ireland (IRMA)	43
Lithuania (AGATA)	31
Lithuania Airplay (TopHit)	60
Norway (VG-lista)	68
NZ Catalogue (Recorded Music NZ)	14
Sweden Heatseeker (Sverigetopplistan)	5
UK Singles (Official Charts)	30
UK Indie (Official Charts)	4
US Billboard Hot 100	82
US Hot Rock & Alternative Songs (Billboard)	7

=== Monthly charts ===
Monthly chart performance for "Headlock"
Chart (2025)	Peak position
Lithuania Airplay (TopHit)	70

=== Year-end charts ===
Year-end chart performance for "Headlock"
Chart (2025)	Position
US Hot Rock & Alternative Songs (Billboard)	15

== Certifications ==
Certifications for "Headlock"
Region	Certification	Certified units/sales
New Zealand (RMNZ)	Platinum	30,000^{‡}
United Kingdom (BPI)	Gold	400,000^{‡}
United States (RIAA)	Platinum	1,000,000^{‡}
^{‡} Sales+streaming figures based on certification alone.

== Release history ==
Release dates and formats for "Headlock"
Region	Date	Format	Label(s)	Ref.
United States	28 January 2025	Alternative radio	White Rabbit	
