= Run Wild =

Run Wild may refer to:

- Run Wild (Lydia album)
- "Run Wild" (Barbra Streisand song)
- "Run Wild" (Big Time Rush song)
- "Run Wild" (New Order song)
- "Run Wild", the second single off Noel Hogan's album Mono Band
