= Melankton =

Studio album by Kate Havnevik
- Released: September 25, 2006
- Recorded: 2005
- Length: 60:00
- Label: Continentica
- Producers: Kate Havnevik, Carmen Rizzo, Guy Sigsworth

Kate Havnevik chronology
Melankton (2006)	You (2011)

Professional ratings
Review scores
Source	Rating
Allmusic	link
PopMatters	link
Slant	link
Spin	link

Melankton is the debut album by Norwegian singer, Kate Havnevik, featuring the single "Unlike Me," and the song "Nowhere Warm" as featured on the TV show Grey's Anatomy. The album was released in her home country of Norway on April 10, 2006, before being issued in the UK, accompanied by a bonus track, entitled "Travel In Time," which was written and produced with Carmen Rizzo (and featured in an episode of TV show The O.C. in 2005). Rizzo also helped mix some tracks and master the record.

The album premiered online on Havnevik's official website for 48 hours from 11–12 March 2006, and was added to Apple Computer's iTunes music store on 27 March 2006. Melankton was mixed and mastered in Los Angeles, having been recorded in London, Bratislava, Oslo, Reykjavík and Los Angeles. The strings were recorded first in Bratislava and Oslo, and the vocals were recorded last in Havnevik's London flat. In addition, the album also features production from Frou Frou member, Guy Sigsworth, who contributes tracks including "Unlike Me," "Not Fair" and "You Again." Sean McGhee mixed the majority of the album as well as co writing a number of songs.

Melankton is named after a character in a Norwegian book called Oppdageren by Jan Kjærstad, and means "black rose."

The album was released through Havnevik's own record label, Continentica Records, and licensed in the USA by Universal Music.

So far there have been four releases of the album:

- 2006 Norway
- 2006 UK
- 2007 USA/Canada
- 2010 Poland

== Track listing ==
1. "Unlike Me" – 4:45
2. "Travel in Time" – 4:09 (UK, USA/CAN, Poland)
3. "I Don't Know You" – 4:10
4. "Not Fair" – 5:18
5. "Nowhere Warm" – 4:59
6. "You Again" – 3:26
7. "Serpentine" – 5:22
8. "Kaleidoscope" – 4:19
9. "Sleepless" – 5:05
10. "Suckerlove" – 5:56
11. "Timeless" - (US/CAN, Poland)
12. "Se Meg" – 5:13 (Norway & UK)
13. "Someday" – 4:42 (Norway only)
14. "New Day" – 7:42
15. "Grace" – 3:03 (Bonus Track, Poland only)
16. "So:Lo" - (USA/CAN only)
