= Details (album) =

2002 studio album by Frou Frou

Studio album by Frou Frou
- Released: June 4, 2002 (US)
- Studio: Froufrou Central (London); Flat Studios (Bern); RAK Studios (London); Ganalahari Studios (Bangalore); Sterling Sound (New York City); Pete Scaturro's house
- Genre: Electropop; alternative pop
- Length: 49:30
- Label: MCA (US); Island (Int.)
- Producer: Imogen Heap; Guy Sigsworth

Frou Frou chronology
Details (2002)	Off Cuts (2022)

Imogen Heap chronology
I Megaphone (1998)	Details (2002)	Speak for Yourself (2005)

Guy Sigsworth chronology
Cradle (1997)	Details (2002)	STET (2019)

Singles from Details
- 1. "Breathe In"; 2. "Let Go"; 3. "It's Good to Be in Love"; 4. "Must Be Dreaming"

Details is the only studio album by British electronic duo Frou Frou. It was released on June 4, 2002, by MCA Records in the United States and by Island Records internationally.

== Commercial performance ==
As of 2009, the song "Let Go" has sold 370,000 units in the US while the album has sold 284,000 copies in the US and 29,000 copies in the UK.

== Reception ==
Professional ratings
Review scores
Source	Rating
Allmusic	4.5/5 stars
Drowned in Sound	7/10

Play reviewed Details positively, calling the duo "refreshing" and "not the typical electronic dance-music factory drones" and writing, "This melodic, occasionally striking collection of new-wave dance songs doesn't reek of overproduction, benefiting greatly from the pleasing, softening array of live instruments." For AllMusic, Alex Henderson gave the album three out of five stars, opining that the album had "quality singing and composing" which made it "a cut above much of the electronic Europop that came out in 2002" and comparing it to the music of singers Björk, Kate Bush, and Dido. Andy Thomas of Drowned in Sound called the album "mature", also comparing it to Dido and writing, "They do have more than a handful of good, if not overly ambitious, tunes."

Zach Braff's use of the song "Let Go" for the ending credits for his film Garden State (2004) and the inclusion on its Grammy-winning soundtrack is credited as exposing Frou Frou and Imogen Heap to a much wider audience. Its use as the last song was actually suggested by Braff's girlfriend at the time, Bonnie Somerville.

Writing for Entertainment Weekly, Ariana Bacle named "Let Go" as the third-best song from the Garden State soundtrack, describing it as "a could-be dance track but with more drama, more heart, and just enough Imogen Heap". On Stereogum's Margaret Farrell's list of the ten best Imogen Heap songs, "Hear Me Out" and "Let Go" were ranked fifth and third, respectively. Farrell described "Let Go" as "a cataclysmic escape" and "a song that bubbles with wonder and excitement bordering on anxiety", also identifying it as "probably Frou Frou's most popular song".

== Track listing ==
All tracks are written by and produced by Imogen Heap and Guy Sigsworth, except where noted.

No.	Title	Writer(s)	Length
1.	"Let Go"		4:13
2.	"Breathe In"		4:27
3.	"It's Good to Be in Love"		4:39
4.	"Must Be Dreaming"		4:01
5.	"Psychobabble"	Heap; Sigsworth; Peter Chill	5:33
6.	"Only Got One"		4:09
7.	"Shh"		5:34
8.	"Hear Me Out"	Heap; Sigsworth; Lee Bennett; Brian Eno	4:19
9.	"Maddening Shroud"	Heap; Sigsworth; Alexander Nilere	3:37
10.	"Flicks"	Heap; Sigsworth; Jon Hassell	3:58
11.	"The Dumbing Down of Love"	Heap; Sigsworth; Hassell	4:44

International bonus track
No.	Title	Writer(s)	Length
12.	"Old Piano"	Heap; Sigsworth; Hassell	5:09

20th Anniversary Edition
No.	Title	Length
13.	"Close Up"	4:20

=== Samples ===
- "Hear Me Out" contains a sample from "An Ending (Ascent)" by Brian Eno.
- "Maddening Shroud" is a cover of "Maddening Shroud" by Acacia, which itself contains a sample of "Ederlezi" by Goran Bregović.

== Singles ==
- UK CD single (2002) CID 799/582941-2
  1. "Breathe In" (Radio Edit) 3.49
  2. "Close Up" 4.20
  3. "Breathe In" (Watkins Radio Edit) 3.40
- UK CD promo (2002) FROUCD2
  1. "Breathe In" (Radio Edit) 3.49
- UK CD promo (2002) FROUCD3
  1. "Breathe In" (Watkins Radio Edit) 3.40
  2. "Breathe In" (Radio Edit) 3.49
- UK 12" single (2002) 12 IS 799
  1. "Breathe In" (Watkins Full Vocal Remix) 7.59
  2. "Breathe In" (Radio Edit) 3.49
  3. "Breathe In" (Aphrodite Full Remix) 6.41
- UK 7" promo (2002) FROU 1
  1. "Breathe In" (Mr Roque Mix)
  2. "Breathe In" (Mr Roque Dub)
- UK 12" promo (2002) 12 FROU 1
  1. "Breathe In" (Watkins Vocal Mix 12")
  2. "Breathe In" (Watkins Loves You Dub)
- UK 12" promo (2002) 12 FROU 2
  1. "Breathe In" (Aphrodite Remix)
  2. "Breathe In" (Aphrodite Dub)
- UK 12" promo (2002) 12 FROU 3
  1. "Breathe In" (DJ Encore Remix)
- US 12" promo (2002) MCAR-25773-1
  1. "Breathe In" (DJ Encore Remix) 4.03
  2. "Breathe In" (Aphrodite Remix) 6.48
  3. "Breathe In" (Watkins Vocal Mix) 8.00
  4. "Breathe In" (Mr Roque Mix) 5.22
- IT 12" single (2002) UNIV 06.02
  1. "Breathe In" (Watkins Mix Vocal Mix-Full Version) 7.59
  2. "Breathe In" (Radio Edit) 3.49
  3. "Breathe In" (Aphrodite Full Vocal Mix) 6.41
- US CD promo (2002)
  1. "Let Go" 4.12
- UK CD promo (2003) FROUCD6
  1. "Must Be Dreaming" (Radio Edit)
- UK 12" promo (2002) 12 FROU 4 PROMO
  1. "Must Be Dreaming" (K-Klass Ultra Vocal Mix) 7.38
  2. "Must Be Dreaming" (K-Klass Spektral Dub) 6.42
  3. "Must Be Dreaming" (Ruff & Jam Club Vocal) 6.00
  4. "Must Be Dreaming" (Soul Mekanik Mix) 9.01
- UK 12" promo (2002) 12 FROU 5 PROMO
  1. "Must Be Dreaming" (Ruff & Jam Nightmare Dub) 8.22
  2. "Must Be Dreaming" (Laser Remix) 6.37
- US CD promo (2002) MCAR-25945-2
  1. "Must Be Dreaming" (Ruff & Jam Radio Edit) 3.47
  2. "Must Be Dreaming" (Laser Radio Edit) 3.33
  3. "Must Be Dreaming" (Ruff & Jam Vocal Club 12" Mix) 6.02
  4. "Must Be Dreaming" (K-Klass Ultra Vocal Mix) 7.43
  5. "Must Be Dreaming" (Laser Dance Mix) 6.42
  6. "Must Be Dreaming" (Ruff & Jam Nightmare Dub) 8.22
  7. "Must Be Dreaming" (K-Klass Spektral Dub) 6.45
  8. "Must Be Dreaming" [Single Version] 4.00
- US 12" promo (2002) MCAR-25944-1
  1. "Must Be Dreaming" (Ruff & Jam Vocal Club 12" Mix) 6.02
  2. "Must Be Dreaming" (Ruff & Jam Nightmare Dub) 8.28
  3. "Must Be Dreaming" (K-Klass Ultra Vocal Mix) 7.43
  4. "Must Be Dreaming" (K-Klass Spektral Dub) 6.57
- EU CD promo (2002) FROUCD7
  1. "Must Be Dreaming" [Single Version] 4.01
  2. "Must Be Dreaming" (Ruff & Jam Vocal Club 12" Mix) 6.03
  3. "Must Be Dreaming" (K-Klass Ultra Vocal Mix) 7.40
  4. "Must Be Dreaming" (Laser Remix) 6.40
  5. "Must Be Dreaming" (Soul Mekanik Mix) 9.01
- UK CD promo (2003) MCSYDJ40322
  1. "It's Good to Be in Love" (Ruff & Jam Club Edit)
- UK 12" promo (2002) WMCSTX 40322
  1. "It's Good to Be in Love" (Watkins Love's Love Vocal Mix)
  2. "It's Good to Be in Love" (Ruff & Jam Club Mix Extended)
- UK 12" promo (2003) WMCSTZ40322
  1. "It's Good to Be in Love" (Watkins Good To Be Dub Mix)
  2. "It's Good to Be in Love" (Dark Globe's Mondo Scuro Vocal)
  3. "It's Good to Be in Love" (Dark Globe's Mondo Scuro Dub)
- EU CD promo (2003) MCSXDJ40322
  1. "It's Good to Be in Love" (Radio Edit)
  2. "It's Good to Be in Love" (Ruff & Jam Club Edit)

== Personnel ==
Credits adapted from Tidal.

- Imogen Heap – vocals, production, mixing (tracks 7, 11)
- Guy Sigsworth – production, keyboards (track 2), mixing (tracks 7, 11)
- Mich Gerber – double bass (tracks 1, 5)
- Ioana Petcu-Colan – violin (tracks 1, 5)
- Alasdair Malloy – percussion (tracks 3, 5, 7)
- Elad Elharar – bass guitar (track 3)
- Makoto Sakamoto – drums (tracks 4, 6)
- Jon Hassell – trumpet (tracks 10–11)
- Tom Coyne – mastering
- Gili Wiseburgh – mixing (tracks 1–2, 4–6, 8–10), engineering (tracks 1–10), recording arrangement (tracks 1–10), additional mixing (tracks 3, 7)
- Tom Elmhirst – mixing (track 3), additional mixing (track 1)
- Damian Taylor – mixing (track 2), additional mixing (track 11)
- Sean McGhee – engineering (track 4)
- Gert Staeuble – recording arrangement (track 5)
- Pete Scaturro – recording arrangement (track 10), recording engineering (track 11)
