= Guy Sigsworth =

English record producer and songwriter (born 1960)

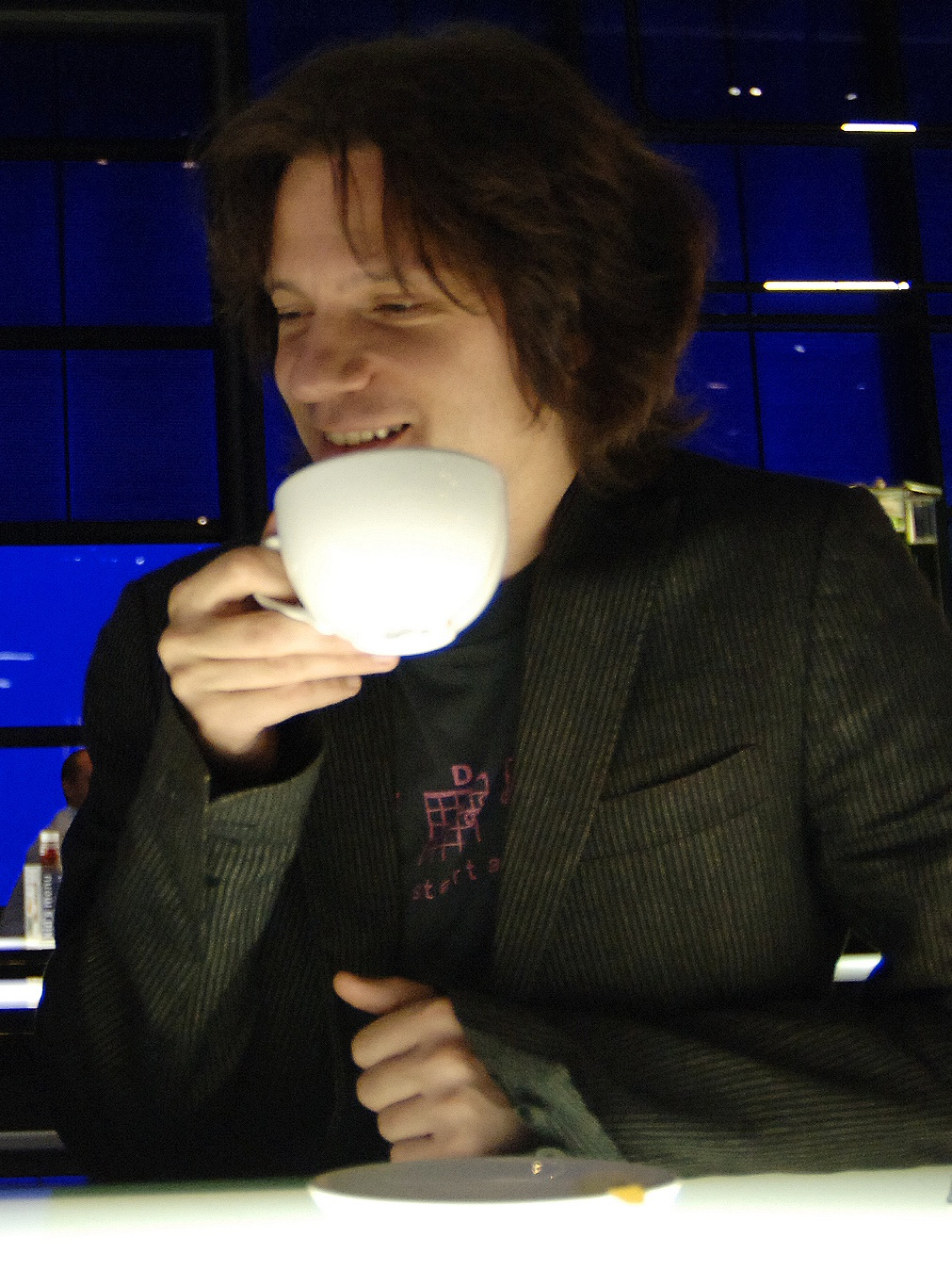
- Sigsworth in 2007

Background information
- Born: Allan Arthur Guy Sigsworth; May 1960 (age 66); Ilkley, England
- Occupations: Record producer; songwriter; musician
- Instruments: Keyboards; harpsichord; clavichord; guitar
- Labels: Mercury KX; Decca; Universal Classics
- Member of: Frou Frou
- Formerly of: Acacia
- Website: guysigsworth.co.uk

Allan Arthur Guy Sigsworth (born May 1960) is an English record producer and songwriter. He has worked with many artists, including Seal, Björk, Goldie, Madonna, Britney Spears, Kate Havnevik, Imogen Heap, Bebel Gilberto, Mozez, David Sylvian, Alanis Morissette, Eric Whitacre, Alison Moyet, and Aurora. He has also collaborated with many celebrated instrumental musicians, including Talvin Singh, Jon Hassell, and Lester Bowie. He is a member of the duo Frou Frou, with Imogen Heap.

== Early life ==
Allan Arthur Guy Sigsworth was born in May 1960 and grew up in Ilkley, West Yorkshire, where he developed a youthful passion for early music, especially the 14th-century composer Guillaume de Machaut. His earliest musical heroes were the multi-instrumentalist David Munrow and the maverick field recordist and composer David Fanshawe. He was a pupil at Leeds Grammar School in the 1970s. He studied the harpsichord, first at summer schools at the Casa de Mateus in Portugal, and later for a year at the Utrechts Conservatorium in the Netherlands. He toured Europe playing harpsichord for the European Union Baroque Orchestra.

Sigsworth has worked with various engineers and programmers of distinction. During the late 1990s, he worked with Damian Taylor, who has since engineered, programmed, and performed live with Björk; in the early 2000s, he worked with Sean McGhee, who has since produced Temposhark; and most recently, he has worked extensively with Andy Page, who has previously worked with Sasha, BT, and Harry Gregson-Williams.

== Career ==
=== Seal ===
After returning to the UK, Sigsworth moved to London and made a sudden change of direction. He became fascinated with the burgeoning acid house sound, and immediately bought a Roland sampler and an Atari computer. He met musician Seal, co-writing four songs on his debut album: "Crazy", "The Beginning", "Wild", and "Violet", plus the B-side, "Sparkle". The album's producer, Trevor Horn, was the first pop record producer Sigsworth had ever met.

=== Bomb the Bass / Hector Zazou ===
Tim Simenon was also involved in work on Seal's song "Crazy", and Sigsworth soon became part of the regular production team of Simenon's band, Bomb the Bass, co-writing the UK No. 7 hit single "Winter in July". He also worked with Simenon on Hector Zazou's 1992 album Sahara Blue, performing alongside celebrated French actor Gérard Depardieu on the track "I'll Strangle You". Sigsworth subsequently contributed to Zazou's 1994 album Chansons des mers froides, accompanying Björk.

=== Talvin Singh ===
While working on sessions for Japanese drummer/producer Gota Yashiki, Sigsworth met virtuoso tabla player Talvin Singh. He subsequently played synthesizer and harpsichord for Singh's live shows, and later played and contributed remixes on Singh's debut album, OK.

=== "Survival Game" ===
In 1993, Sigsworth produced the benefit song "Survival Game" for the relief organization Menschen für Menschen in Ethiopia, founded by actor Karlheinz Böhm. The song was written by Mike Turtle and Dean Frederick. The track was later remixed by Paul Dakeyne and hit the charts in South America and Europe.

=== Björk ===
While working with Talvin Singh, Sigsworth met Björk, becoming keyboard player, and later music director, of her live band for two albums, adding harpsichord, clavichord, regal, and positive organ accompaniments to her music. His harpsichord can be heard on the song "Cover Me" from the album Post; the clavichord on the song "All Is Full of Love"; and organ on "Unravel" from Homogenic. "Unravel" was Sigsworth's first co-written song with Björk. Sigsworth also played celesta on Björk's cover of Joni Mitchell's "The Boho Dance". The instrument later became a feature on both Selmasongs (where he also contributed a string arrangement) and Vespertine, on which he co-wrote "Hidden Place", "An Echo, A Stain", "Sun in My Mouth", and "Harm of Will".

=== Imogen Heap ===
Sigsworth first met Imogen Heap in 1996 after a friend played him a demo of her song "Come Here Boy". He immediately fell in love with her distinctive voice. He was also amazed to hear that she shared his idiosyncratic love of melodies featuring wide, angular intervals—especially major 7ths and minor 9ths—which are not so common in pop. They wrote two songs together, "Getting Scared" and "Airplane", which Sigsworth produced for her debut album, I Megaphone. In return, Heap sang backing vocals on Sigsworth's band project with Alexander Nilere, Acacia.

=== G:MT ===
In 1999, Sigsworth scored the movie G:MT - Greenwich Mean Time, which included musical contributions from Imogen Heap, Talvin Singh, and free jazz virtuoso Lester Bowie.

=== Madonna ===
Sigsworth co-produced the 1998 Mandalay album Empathy, which attracted the attention of Madonna. This in turn led to him co-writing the song "What It Feels Like for a Girl" with Madonna and David Torn, for her 2000 album Music. Sigsworth also wrote the song "Nothing Fails" with Jem for Madonna's 2003 album American Life.

== Frou Frou ==
One night in Mumbai, India, where he was producing a song for British artist Amar, Sigsworth composed a tune on his Yamaha QY20 pocket sequencer. As soon as he arrived back in London, he took it to Imogen Heap, and asked her to write a top line for it. It became "Flicks", their first song for what would become the Frou Frou album Details. Originally, there was no plan for Sigsworth and Heap to form a band. It was simply a matter of Sigsworth wanting to hear various song ideas properly realized. As Heap said: "Every month or so, Guy would phone me up and say 'I've got a new song, would you come in and sing it?', and then before we knew it, we'd already started the album."

As a linking concept for the emerging set of songs, Sigsworth suggested two ideas for the lyrics:

1. They should feel like one half of a conversation rather than singer-on-a-soapbox declarations. Sigsworth's inspiration for this was the 1932 Jean Cocteau play La voix humaine (the entire text of the play consists of one side of a telephone conversation between a woman and her former lover. Her lover's words are never heard but are inferred from her words).
2. The word "love" should be used as often as possible.

Sigsworth wrote the lyrics to the songs "Breathe In", "Only Got One", and "The Dumbing Down of Love", and co-wrote the lyrics to "Let Go", "It's Good to Be in Love", and "Psychobabble" on Details. Heap wrote the remaining lyrics, apart from "Maddening Shroud", which was texted by Alexander Nilere.

After eleven songs had been completed, Heap and Sigsworth set about finding a name for their collaborative effort. Sigsworth, a fan of all things French, came up with "Frou Frou", which Heap loved. The name comes from Rimbaud's 1870 poem "Ma Bohème", and is a French onomatopoeic word originally meaning the swishing noise made by skirts on dancing women. The album title, "Details", was a reference to the way the songs were constructed in the studio, by layering momentary details of sounds and performances to create a web of sound.

The album was released in 2002 on Universal Records. It was critically acclaimed, but did not achieve mass sales. "Breathe In" was released as the first single internationally, and reached number two on the Italian radio airplay charts, but follow-up singles "Must Be Dreaming" and "It's Good to Be in Love" were never commercially released in the UK. A video was also made for "The Dumbing Down of Love", directed by Joel Peissig (who later directed Heap's solo video "Hide and Seek"). After touring the record extensively across the United States, where the duo had established a cult fan base, Frou Frou disbanded in 2003.

Heap and Sigsworth temporarily reformed Frou Frou to record a cover version of "Holding Out for a Hero", originally recorded by Bonnie Tyler, for the Shrek 2 soundtrack. The duo were approached by the music director of the film, who had been a fan of their album. The resulting track is played during the end credits of the film. Frou Frou also experienced a resurgence in popularity in 2004, when Scrubs star Zach Braff chose album track "Let Go" for his independent film Garden State. Other Frou Frou tracks have been included on television series, such as CSI: Crime Scene Investigation and Roswell High.

== Discography ==
=== Solo ===
- STET (2019)

=== Acacia ===
- Cradle (1997)

=== Frou Frou ===
- Details (2002)
- Off Cuts (EP, 2022)

=== As primary producer ===
- Mandalay – Empathy (1998)
- Baz – Psychedelic Love (2003)
- Kate Havnevik – Melankton (2006)
- Richard Walters – Pilot Lights EP (2007)
- Temposhark – The Invisible Line (2007)
- Alanis Morissette – Flavors of Entanglement (2008)
- Kate Havnevik – Me (2009)
- Diana Vickers – Songs from the Tainted Cherry Tree (2010)
- Kate Havnevik – You (2011)
- Alanis Morissette – Havoc and Bright Lights (2012)
- Hildegard Von Bingen, Stevie Wishart & Sinfonye – Hildegard (2012)
- Alison Moyet – The Minutes (2013)
- Kate Havnevik – Residue (2014)
- Kate Havnevik – &i (2015)
- Alison Moyet – Other (2017)
- Jadu Heart – Melt Away (2019)
- Kate Havnevik – Lightship (2022)

=== Remixes ===
- Bomb the Bass – "The Air You Breathe (Real Mellow Mix)" (1991)
- Lio – "L'Autre Joue (L'Autre Mix)" (1991)
- Lio – "L'Autre Joue (Heaven Mix)" (1991)
- Dali – "Daylight (One For My Baby Mix)" (1995)
- Badmarsh & Shri – "Air I Breathe (Guy Sigsworth Remix)" (1998)
- Talvin Singh – "Vikram the Vampire (Heavy Rotation Refixx)" (1999)
- Talvin Singh – "OK (Heavy Rotation Refixx)" (1999)
- Björk – "All is Full of Love (Guy Sigsworth Remix)" (1999)
- David Sylvian – "Godman (Guy Sigsworth Remix)" (1999)
- Aphrodite – "See Thru It (Frou Frou Edit)" (2002)
- Bebel Gilberto – "O Caminho (Guy Sigsworth Mix)" (2005)
- Mirah – "La Familia (Guy Sigsworth Remix)" (2006)
- Diana Vickers – "Jumping Into Rivers (Frou Frou Central Mix)" (2010)
- Alison Moyet – "Changeling (Guy Sigsworth Remix)" (2013)
- Alison Moyet – "Right as Rain (Guy Sigsworth Remix)" (2013)
- Amy Lee – "Love Exists (Guy Sigsworth Mix)" (2017)
- Gia Margaret – "Solid Heart (Guy Sigsworth Remix)" (2021)

=== Work with other artists ===
List of songs co-written, featuring production involvement, instrumentation, arrangement, engineering, and/or mixing for other artists, showing year released and album name
Title	Year	Artist	Album	Credit(s)					
Title	Year	Artist	Album	Writing	Production	Instrumentation	Arrangement	Engineering	Mixing
All tracks	1990	Sally Natasha Oldfield	Natasha			Programming, drum programming	Co		
"Sparkle"	1990	Seal	Crazy	Yes	Co				
"A Minor Groove"	1991	Seal	Future Love EP	Yes					
"The Beginning"	1991	Seal	Seal	Yes		Keyboards, sampling			
"Crazy"	1991	Seal	Seal	Yes	Yes	Keyboards, sampling			
"Wild"	1991	Seal	Seal	Yes		Keyboards, sampling			
"Violet"	1991	Seal	Seal	Yes		Keyboards, sampling			
"Love So True (Depth Charge Remix)"	1991	Bomb the Bass	Unknown Territory			Additional keyboards			
"Winter In July (7" Mix)"	1991	Bomb the Bass	Unknown Territory	Yes		Keyboards, sampling			
"The Air You Breathe"	1991	Bomb the Bass	Unknown Territory	Yes		Keyboards, sampling			
"Winter In July (Ubiquity Mix)"	1991	Bomb the Bass	Unknown Territory	Yes		Keyboards, sampling			
"Love So True (12" Mix)"	1991	Bomb the Bass	Unknown Territory			Additional keyboards			
"Born To Be Alive!"	1992	Adamski	Naughty			Additional programming			
"Time Capsule"	1992	Adamski	Naughty			Additional programming			
"Newsflash"	1992	Adamski	Naughty			Additional programming			
"Head-On-Collision-Ism"	1992	Adamski	Naughty			Additional programming			
"No Return"	1992	Nokko	Hallelujah			Keyboards			
"Crazy Clouds"	1992	Nokko	Hallelujah			Keyboards			
"日なたのヒヨコ (Dandelion Heart)"	1992	Nokko	Hallelujah			Keyboards			
"Holy Night"	1992	Nokko	Hallelujah			Keyboards			
"What I've Got"	1992	Vitamino	Non-album single	Yes	Co				Yes
"I'll Strangle You"	1992	Hector Zazou	Sahara Blue			Keyboards			
All tracks	1992	Simon Climie	Soul Inspiration			Keyboards, programming			
"The Flame"	1992	Natasha Oldfield	The Flame			Keyboards			
"Crazy Clouds"	1993	Nokko	Call Me Nightlife			Keyboards			
All tracks	1993	Naked Truth	Fight		Yes				
"Survival Game"	1993	It's 5 to 12	Non-album single		Yes				
"Come In Out of the Rain"	1993	Kenji Hammer	A Few Years Since EP			Hammond B-3			
"A Few Years Since"	1993	Kenji Hammer	A Few Years Since EP			Wurlitzer			
"Visur Vatnsenda-Rosu"	1994	Hector Zazou	Songs From The Cold Seas			Grand piano			
"Cover Me"	1995	Björk	Post			Harpsichord			
"Venus As A Boy (Harpsichord)"	1995	Björk	Isobel			Harpsichord	Co		
"An Inexperienced Man"	1995	Gary Kemp	Little Bruises			Programming			
"These Are The Days (Born Under Twins)"	1995	Gary Kemp	Little Bruises			Programming			
"Sweet Sweet Intuition"	1995	Björk	It's Oh So Quiet			Organ			
"Possibly Maybe (Calcutta Cyber Cafe Mix)"	1996	Björk	Possibly Maybe			Additional keyboards			
"Together (Tears Of Joy) (Original TV Mix)"	1996	Gota				Keyboards			
"Hunter"	1997	Björk	Homogenic			Clavichord, keyboards, pipe organ			
"Jóga"	1997	Björk	Homogenic			Clavichord, keyboards, pipe organ			
"Unravel"	1997	Björk	Homogenic	Yes	Co	Clavichord, keyboards, pipe organ			
"All Neon Like"	1997	Björk	Homogenic			Clavichord, keyboards, pipe organ			
"5 Years"	1997	Björk	Homogenic			Clavichord, keyboards, pipe organ			
"Alarm Call"	1997	Björk	Homogenic			Clavichord, keyboards, pipe organ			
"Pluto"	1997	Björk	Homogenic			Clavichord, keyboards, pipe organ			
"All is Full of Love"	1997	Björk	Homogenic			Clavichord, keyboards, pipe organ			
"Scary"	1997	Björk	Bachelorette	Yes		Harpsichord			
"Traveller"	1998	Talvin Singh	OK			Keyboards, distortion			
"Sutrix"	1998	Talvin Singh	OK			Keyboards, distortion			
"OK"	1998	Talvin Singh	OK			Keyboards, distortion			
"Mother"	1998	Goldie	Saturnz Return			Keyboards			
"Getting Scared"	1998	Imogen Heap	I Megaphone	Yes	Yes				
"Sweet Religion"	1998	Imogen Heap	I Megaphone			Programming			
"Be There" (feat. Ian Brown)	1998	UNKLE	Psyence Fiction			Mellotron		Additional	
"People Are Strange (UNKLE Remix)"	1998	Stina Nordenstam	People Are Strange		Additional				
"Airplane"	1998	Imogen Heap	Shine		Yes	Programming			Yes
"The Beginning"	1998	Akemi Kakihara	Yes			Bass programming, drum programming			
"Deep"	1998	Akemi Kakihara	Yes			Sampler			
"Yes"	1998	Akemi Kakihara	Yes			Keyboards, sampler			
"Blue Apple"	1998	Akemi Kakihara	Yes			Strings			
"Girl"	1998	Akemi Kakihara	Yes			Sampler			
"Fast Train"	1998	Akemi Kakihara	Yes			Sampler			
"Sweet September"	1998	Akemi Kakihara	Yes			Bass programming			
"Overture"	2000	Björk	Selmasongs			Celesta			
"Cvalda"	2000	Björk	Selmasongs			Celesta			
"I've Seen it All"	2000	Björk	Selmasongs			Celesta	Co		
"Scatterheart"	2000	Björk	Selmasongs			Celesta			
"In the Musicals"	2000	Björk	Selmasongs			Celesta			
"107 Steps"	2000	Björk	Selmasongs			Celesta			
"New World"	2000	Björk	Selmasongs			Celesta			
"What It Feels Like for a Girl"	2000	Madonna	Music	Yes	Co	Guitar, keyboards, programming			
"Sometimes it Snows in April"	2000	Amar	Outside		Yes				
"Inner Sanctum"	2000	3rd Core	Pandemic		Co				
"Mindless and Broken"	2000	3rd Core	Pandemic		Co				
"Cold Comfort"	2000	3rd Core	Pandemic		Co				
"Driving Me Blue"	2000	3rd Core	Pandemic		Co				
"Numb"	2000	3rd Core	Pandemic		Co				
"Race"	2000	3rd Core	Pandemic		Co				
"Mother Heroic"	2001	Björk	Hidden Place	Yes		Celesta			
"Foot Soldier"	2001	Björk	Hidden Place	Yes					
"What Sound"	2001	Lamb	What Sound				String		
"One"	2001	Lamb	What Sound		Co				
"I Cry"	2001	Lamb	What Sound			Bass line			
"Heaven"	2001	Lamb	What Sound		Co	Bass line			
"Small"	2001	Lamb	What Sound		Co				
"Gabriel"	2001	Lamb	What Sound		Co				
"Just Is"	2001	Lamb	What Sound		Co				
"Hidden Place"	2001	Björk	Vespertine			Programming	Choir		
"It's Not Up to You"	2001	Björk	Vespertine			Clavichord	Clavichord		
"An Echo A Stain"	2001	Björk	Vespertine	Yes		Beat programming, celeste	Choir		
"Sun in My Mouth"	2001	Björk	Vespertine	Yes		Celeste	Celeste		
"Harm of Will"	2001	Björk	Vespertine	Yes		Celeste	Celeste		
"Unison"	2001	Björk	Vespertine			Programming	Choir		
"Blow My Mind"	2002	Robyn	Don't Stop the Music		Yes	All instruments			
"Should Have Known"	2002	Robyn	Don't Stop the Music		Yes	All instruments			
"What I've Got"	2002	Akkersson	Non-album single	Yes					
"It's in Our Hands"	2002	Björk	Non-album single			Programming			
"Whatever Makes You Happy"	2003	Sugababes	Three		Co	All instruments			
"Million Different Ways"	2003	Sugababes	Three	Yes	Co				Yes
"We Could Have It All"	2003	Sugababes	Three		Co				Yes
"Maya"	2003	Sugababes	Three	Yes	Co	All instruments			Yes
"Everytime"	2003	Britney Spears	In the Zone		Yes	All instruments			
"Nothing Fails"	2003	Madonna	American Life	Yes					
"Cada Beijo"	2004	Bebel Gilberto	Bebel Gilberto	Yes	Yes	Keyboards, drums, programming			
"New Shoes"	2005	Juliet	Random Order	Yes	Yes				Yes
"Bruised"	2005	Sugababes	Taller in More Ways		Yes	All instruments			
"Feel Free"	2005	Mozez	So Still		Yes				
"Venus Rise"	2005	Mozez	So Still		Yes				
"Like the Weather"	2005	Sugababes	Push the Button	Yes	Yes	All instruments			
"Someday (I Will Understand)"	2005	Britney Spears	Britney & Kevin: Chaotic		Yes	All instruments (except piano), sounds			
"Over to You Now"	2005	Britney Spears	Britney & Kevin: Chaotic	Yes	Yes	All instruments			
"You Are Loved (Don't Give Up)"	2006	Josh Groban	Awake		Vocal				
"Momento"	2007	Bebel Gilberto	Momento		Co	Programming			
"Close To You"	2007	Bebel Gilberto	Momento		Co	Programming			
"Azul"	2007	Bebel Gilberto	Momento		Co	Acoustic guitar, programming			
"Cadê Você?"	2007	Bebel Gilberto	Momento		Co	Programming			
"Wonderful"	2007	Mutya Buena	Real Girl		Yes	Piano, guitar, sampler, synthesizer, drum programming, bass			
"Evolution of Waters"	2007	Valgeir Sigurðsson	Ekvílibríum			Celesta			
"The Boho Dance"	2007	Björk	A Tribute To Joni Mitchell		Co	Celesta, programming, editing			
"Crashing Down"	2007	Olivia Broadfield	Eyes Wide Open		Yes	Keys, vocals, samples, synths, software			
"Out From Under"	2008	Britney Spears	Circus		Yes	Strings, keyboards, hang samples, drum programming			
"My Baby"	2008	Britney Spears	Circus	Yes	Yes				
"Paper Made Man"	2009	Amy Studt	My Paper Made Men	Yes	Yes	All instruments, noises			
"Broken Pieces" (feat. Lacey Sturm)	2010	Apocalyptica	7th Symphony	Yes					
"Sunlight"	2010	Diana Vickers	Once		Yes	Keyboards			
"Up There"	2010	VersaEmerge	Fixed at Zero	Yes		Programming			
"雪女王 (Snow Queen)"	2010	SingerSen	Sirens		Yes				
"Heart Skips a Beat"	2011	Lenka	Two		Yes	Strings, keyboards			
"You Will Be Mine"	2011	Lenka	Two	Yes	Yes	Strings, keyboards			
"Shock Me Into Love"	2011	Lenka	Two	Yes	Yes	Strings, keyboards			
"Heartbeats"	2011	SingerSen	Non-album single		Yes				
"Blossom"	2012	Richard Walters	Regret Less		Yes				
"Somebody to Love"	2013	Daniele Negroni	Bulletproof	Yes					
"Fly to Paradise"	2013	Eric Whitacre	Non-album single		Yes				
"Sea Song (You Waded Out)"	2015	Apocalyptica	Shadowmaker	Yes					
"Love Exists"	2017	Amy Lee	Non-album single		Yes				
"Chances"	2019	Dido	Still On My Mind	Yes					
"Dance on the Moon"	2019	AURORA	A Different Kind of Human - Step II	Yes					
"Shores of Mona"	2022	Nick Mulvey	New Mythology	Yes					
"Mona"	2022	Nick Mulvey	New Mythology	Yes					
"Flashback"	2023	Hannah Diamond	Perfect Picture	Yes	Co				
