= Kate Havnevik =

Norwegian singer-songwriter (born 1975)

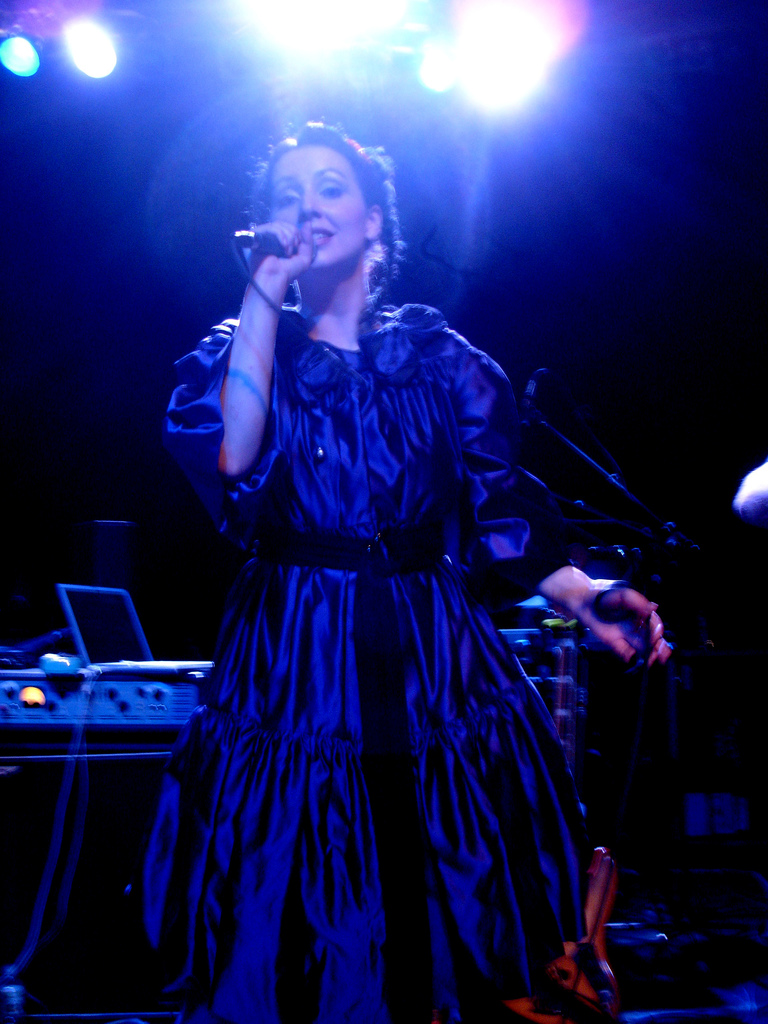
- Havnevik performing in 2007

Background information
- Born: Kate Havnevik; 27 October 1975 (age 50); Oslo, Norway
- Genres: Electronica, alternative dance, trip hop, pop
- Occupations: Composer, songwriter, singer
- Years active: 2000–present
- Label: Continentica
- Website: KateHavnevik.com

Kate Havnevik (born 27 October 1975) is a Norwegian film composer, songwriter and singer. Her debut album, the critically acclaimed electronica-infused Melankton, was released in March 2006 on iTunes and April 2006 (on physical CD) in Norway only, before being licensed internationally to Universal Republic USA later. Havnevik has successfully utilized PledgeMusic campaigns to fund some of her albums, including You, released October 2011, and &i, released March 2015. Her music has been prominently featured in TV shows such as Grey's Anatomy, The O.C., and The West Wing.

== Early life ==
Kate Havnevik is the child of classical flautists Andrew Cunningham and Lotte Havnevik. She can play the piano, the guitar, and the melodica amongst other instruments. Earlier in life, she aspired to be a classical and jazz musician, much like her parents, who are both classically trained musicians. At 14, her goals shifted when she joined an all female punk rock band, rehearsing and playing at Oslo's illegally occupied club Blitz. The experience led her to pursue an interest in classical music mixed with modern electronica.

== Music career ==
=== 2005-07: Melankton ===
Havnevik set about working with producers to help hone her sound, the most famous of whom is Guy Sigsworth, part of Frou Frou, who has also worked with Imogen Heap, Madonna, Jem, Britney Spears, Björk and Alanis Morissette. Havnevik tracked down Sigsworth around in 2000, rang him and left phone messages, until one day he agreed to meet her. The pair have co-written and recorded many songs together, some of which have been featured on Melankton, including "Unlike Me", "Not Fair" and "You Again", and some of which will be included on Havnevik's second album 'You', including "Disobey", which Havnevik premiered on her official web site. She describes Melankton as "dramatic, beautiful and euphoric", and deemed it the perfect introduction to her music, which is why it is being released first. The album title is from a character in a Norwegian book Havnevik was reading, and also translates to "black rose", which she says is very fitting for the album. Melankton was mastered in Devon, partly mixed in Los Angeles, partly mixed and recorded in London, Bratislava, Oslo, Reykjavík and Los Angeles. The album was premiered online on Havnevik's official web site for 48 hours from 11–12 March 2006, and was added to Apple Computer's iTunes music store on 27 March 2006. It was commercially released on CD on 3 April in Norway; a special UK edition, omitting "Someday", and instead including "Travel In Time", was released on 16 October 2006. The US edition, featuring a new song titled "Timeless", was released in the United States on 27 March 2007 exactly one year after its iTunes release.

In addition to Sigsworth, Havnevik has also collaborated with Marius De Vries, who has previously worked with Björk and David Gray, Yoad Nevo, famous for his work with Welsh singer Jem, LA producer Carmen Rizzo and Petter Haavik from Norwegian techno group Ost&KJex.

As well as her solo projects, Havnevik has also co-written and provided guest vocals on the tracks "Only This Moment" and "Circuit Breaker" by Röyksopp, both featured on the album The Understanding. Havnevik also contributes vocals to Röyksopp's live EP, Röyksopp's Night Out.

She co-wrote and provided vocals on the track "Crazy", featured on mono band's 2005 self-titled LP, a solo project of former Cranberries guitarist Noel Hogan. Working extensively with Guy Sigsworth, she also provided backing vocals, (as a favor), to a Britney Spears track he produced, which was released in late 2005, entitled "Someday (I Will Understand)."

On 5 December 2006 she made her first ever UK broadcast media appearance, on Janice Long's BBC Radio 2 show, performing "Unlike Me", "I Don't Know You" and "New Day."

A collaboration she recorded with Carmen Rizzo, "Travel In Time", featured on Rizzo's album, The Lost Art Of The Idle Moment. The track was remixed for the UK edition of Melankton and featured on a season 3 episode of the FOX teen drama series "The O.C." and an episode of NBC TV show "Windfall". In 2010, Havnevik again collaborated with Rizzo on the track "This Life" on his "Looking Through Leaves" album.

=== 2008–2012: You and side projects ===
Havnevik released a 5-track EP entitled Me, in September 2008

In February 2012, Havnevik played live on Norwegian radio channel P3, performing "MYYM" from her album You.

Havnevik's vocals are featured on the songs "Don't Go" & " The Fire" from the album "Atemlos" by Schiller, released on 12 March 2010 on iTunes, Germany. Havnevik joined the German concert tour of Schiller in May 2010, which was filmed for the 2 DVD + 1-CD box set 'Lichtblick'. "Atemlos" was made available on USA iTunes and elsewhere during summer 2010. "Lichtblick" was released in November 2010 in Germany, and includes a new song "Ghost", recorded by Havnevik and Christopher von Deylen, especially for it. Havnevik also wrote the songs "Velvet Aeroplane", "Hallucinating Beauty" and "Oasis" for his release "Sonne" in 2012, and joined him on his "Sonne" tour. She performed on the Sonne DVD, recorded in the Berlin O2 Arena in December 2012.

In 2010, Havnevik joined the collective "The Dark Flowers" formed by musician/writer/producer Paul Statham who was inspired after reading the "Motel Chronicles" by Sam Shepard and whilst listening to a soundtrack by Bruce Langhorne, from the 1970s western film, "The Hired Hand". Brian Eno's "Another Green World" has also played an influence. "The Dark Flowers" collective features, apart from Havnevik's "Fast Forest Rain", songs featuring vocalist's Jim Kerr, Dot Allison, Peter Murphy, Shelly Poole, Catherine A.D, Helicopter Girl and Remi Roughe. As of autumn 2010 the project was seeking a record deal.

=== 2012–2014: Mormor og de 8 Ungene movie ===
Kate Havnevik wrote, produced and orchestrated 7 songs for the Family Film-musical Mormor og de 8 Ungene in Norway. The film premiered on 16 August 2013 and was well received in press. The soundtrack is available in Norway. A subtitled version of the film will be released later. This was Havnevik's first film music project. She recorded the songs with Stavanger Symphony Orchestra, and the songs are performed by the actors in the film. Havnevik's Songs include:

- "Familiesamba"
- "De Skal Få Se"
- "Eggedosis"
- "Spor for Spor"
- "Plan B"

She also produced and arranged and orchestrated 2 songs written by Nils Petter Mørland

- "Taxisang"
- "Ensomsang"

Other composers who were part of the project included Stein Johan Grieg Halvorsen and Eyvind Andreas Skeie, who wrote the rest of the songs. The movie was produced by Paradox and directed by Lisa Marie Gamlem.

=== 2015: &I ===
Havnevik wrote and recorded another solo album, &i, released in March 2015, many of the songs having been co-written and produced by long-time collaborator Guy Sigsworth, but also featuring some new collaborators. Havnevik started a PledgeMusic campaign on 21 November 2014, which was run until the release date. The first single "Emperor Of Nowhere" was released on 24 November 2014. The video for Emperor Of Nowhere shows Havnevik in a black and white, darkly animated, scene. The video and song was well received and recommended on several UK music blogs, amongst them Q-magazine.

The video of her second single "Falling" was released on 6 February 2015.

== Discography ==
=== Albums ===
- Melankton (2006)
- You (2011)
- Residue (2014)
- &i (2015)
- Lightship (2022)

=== EPs ===
- Me

Track listing:

- "Show Me Love"
- "Halo"
- "Think Again"
- "Disobey"
- "Soon"

Disobey, a compilation of remixes with 4 versions of "Disobey", including an old version Kate and Guy Sigsworth did back in the day. Track listing:

- "Disobey" Album Version
- "Disobey" Old Version
- "Disobey" Siggi Remix
- "Disobey" Sultan & Ned Mix

=== Singles (& CD Singles) ===
- "Think Again" Official single in Norway (released May 2012 by Continentica Records)
- "Disobey" Official second single in the UK (released May 2012 by Continentica Records)
- "Mouth 2 Mouth" Official single in the UK (released March 2012 by Continentica Records)
- "MYYM" Official single in Norway, (released February 2012 by Continentica Records/ DaWorks Records)
- "Unlike Me" (October 2006 UK single includes a rare a cappella version and a remix by Ost & Kjex · Continentica Records)
- "So:Lo" (November 2006 Digital iTunes Single Release – Continentica Records)
- "Halo" (February 2009, released on iTunes – Continentica Records)
- "Show Me Love" (March 2009, released on iTunes – Continentica Records)
- "Mine" (March 2013, self-released via her website)
- "Micronation" (2014 June – First single of her upcoming &I album)
- "Emperor of Nowhere"
- "Falling" (released worldwide 6 February 2015)
- "The River" (2016 – with Sultan & Shepard)
- "Starlight Fires" (April 2021 – with Guy Sigsworth)
- "Into Dark" (June 2021)
- "Taking Flight" (July 2021)
- "Dream Her To Life" (November 2021)

=== Remixes ===
- "Disobey" remixes by [Siggi Remix] and [Sultan+Ned Shepard remix]
- "Happy Sad" remixed by Beatman & Ludmilla
- "Mouth 2 Mouth" remixed by Milosh
- "Unlike Me" remixed by Ost & Kjex (Cheese & Biscuits)
- "Serpentine" remixed by Dokkemand
- "New Day" remixed by Beatman & Ludmilla
