= Cradle (album) =

1997 studio album by Acacia

Studio album by Acacia
- Released: 13 October 1997
- Recorded: 1993–1996
- Genres: Electronic, alternative, pop
- Length: 66:16
- Label: WEA
- Producer: Guy Sigsworth

Guy Sigsworth chronology
Cradle (1997)	Details (2002)

Cradle is the only album by the English pop group Acacia, which featured record producer Guy Sigsworth and singer Alexander "Blackmoth" Nilere. It is notable for being the first full album released by Sigsworth as both full group member and producer (following his work as keyboard player with Björk and Seal) and for being the first record to heavily feature later solo artist Imogen Heap (who performs on all but one track).

== Details and history ==
The majority of the album was recorded by Sigsworth and Nilere (with Heap as backing singer and constant musical foil, although not a full band member). Two Acacia live musicians (Luca Ramelli and Eshan K) were also credited as part of the band. Two former Acacia live members (Maurizio Anzalone and Ansuman Biswas) actually performed on more of the album tracks than their successors did, but had left the band by the time of the album releases and were therefore credited only as guest musicians. Much of the album's guitar playing was in fact generated by Sigworth's sampler.

The album also features appearances from Colette Meury (Choc Electrique), Loretta Haywood (L.a.z.y.), Ragnhildur "Ragga" Gísladóttir (Tricky, Ragga & the Jack Magic Orchestra), Steve Mack (That Petrol Emotion) and Andrew Tumi (later known as "One" and as part of Supafly).

Cradle was released in 1997 but almost immediately withdrawn due to legal disputes between Warner Music UK and the band's former label Radar Records (although some copies of the album did arrive in the shops and were sold). Fifteen years later in 2012, the band had regained rights to the album and it was re-released via iTunes in May 2012 (followed by an iTunes reissue of the "Maddening Shroud" single in September). On October 5, 2026, the album was re-released onto streaming platforms by XZ1 Recording Ventures Inc., after the main two members (Nilere and Sigsworth) signed a reissue deal with the label.

== Track listing ==
All tracks are written by Alexander Nilere and Guy Sigsworth, except where noted.

No.	Title	Writer(s)	Length
1.	"Wired"		3:52
2.	"I'm in Love with Love"	words: Paul Robson, music: Chris Larkin, Chris Burke, Terry Ashley, Phil Dunne – additional words and music by Nilere, Sigsworth	3:31
3.	"The More You Ignore Me, the Closer I Get"	Stephen Patrick Morrissey, Boz Boorer; arranged by Nilere and Sigsworth	4:13
4.	"Sway"		3:06
5.	"Maddening Shroud"	contains a sample of the traditional song "Ederlezi" from Les Temps du Gitans, arranged by Goran Bregović	3:42
6.	"Unfulfilled Desire"		7:20
7.	"Yellow Is the Colour of My Cowardice"		3:39
8.	"Sympathy"		3:29
9.	"Hate"		3:46
10.	"Boils Down to Money"		3:31
11.	"Woe Woe Song"		4:31
12.	"You Nothing"	contains a sample of "Febus Mundo Orlens", from Music of the Gothic Era	8:34
13.	"Wire" (song is 3:31, track is 12:51 and contains hidden track)		3:31
14.	"Maddening Shroud" (1997 single mix – hidden track, appears during last 3:30 of previous track)		3:30

== Cover versions ==
"I'm in Love with Love" is a cover version of a song by the British band Holiday Patrons (originally released as the B-side to their 1985 debut single "Hottest Time of the Year").

"The More You Ignore Me, the Closer I Get" is a cover version of the Morrissey song from the 1994 album Vauxhall and I (the original version was also a number 8 hit single on the UK Singles Chart during 1994).

"Maddening Shroud" was later covered by Frou Frou, the pop duo set up by Sigsworth and Imogen Heap and appears on their sole album Details.

== Personnel ==
Acacia:

- Alexander Nilere – voice
- Guy Sigsworth – synthesizer, sampler, guitar facsimile (synthesized guitar) (tracks 1–4, 6–8, 10, 11), piano (tracks 12, 13)
- Luca Ramelli – guitar (tracks 2, 5)
- Eshan K (Eshan Khadaroo) – drums (track 2)
- Ansuman Biswas – berimbau, ektara, toys (track 3), santoor (track 6), cymbals, bells, hi-hat (track 7)
- Maurizio Anzalone – guitar (tracks 3, 4, 6, 8–11)

Guest musicians:

- Imogen Heap – backing vocals (tracks 1–12)
- Colette Meury – backing vocals (tracks 1, 7)
- Ragga (Ragnhildur Gísladóttir) – backing vocals (track 3)
- Loretta Heywood – backing vocals (track 5)
- Andrew Tumi – backing vocals (track 12)
- Lisa Ferguson – violin (track 6)
- Steve Mack – guitar (track 7)
