= Goodnight and Go =

2006 song by Imogen Heap

Single by Imogen Heap

from the album Speak for Yourself
- B-side: "Speeding Cars"
- Released: 26 April 2006
- Recorded: 2004
- Genre: Electronic rock, pop, electronica
- Length: 3:52 (album version); 3:28 (Immi's Radio Mix)
- Label: Megaphonic, RCA Victor, Sony BMG
- Songwriter: Imogen Heap
- Producer: Imogen Heap

Imogen Heap singles chronology
| "Hide and Seek" (2005) | "Goodnight and Go" (2006) | "Headlock" (2006) |

Music video
- "Goodnight and Go" on YouTube

"Goodnight and Go" is a song by English singer-songwriter Imogen Heap, the second single from her 2005 album Speak for Yourself. The lyrics of the song describe the "devastation of having a crush." The single received a little more push and promotion in the US than "Hide and Seek", and the music video received airplay on VH1. Jeff Beck plays guitar on the track.

== Release ==
"Goodnight and Go" was remixed by Heap for radio to include elements from her live performances of the track and labelled as "Immi's Radio Mix", which is accompanied on the release by a brand new track "Speeding Cars".

The video, which is featured on the CD release, hit MTV and VH1 UK in early April, before being added to other television channels later in the month, and the single charted at number 56 in the official UK top 75 singles chart. A special edit of the video for the US market was released in late April.

New Mac OS X Leopard Demos introduced on 11 June 2007 feature "Goodnight and Go".

The song was featured on the second series of Made in Chelsea which aired on 14 November 2011.

As of 2009 the song had sold 159,000 copies in United States.

== Track listings ==
CD single and 7" vinyl

1. "Goodnight and Go" (Immi's Radio Mix) – 3:26
2. "Speeding Cars" – 3:31

Promo CD

1. "Goodnight and Go" (Immi's Radio Mix) – 3:26
2. "Goodnight and Go" (album version) – 3:52

== Charts ==
Chart performance for "Goodnight and Go"
| Chart (2006) | Peak position |
|---|---|
| United Kingdom | 56 |

== Ariana Grande version ==
"Goodnight n Go"

Song by Ariana Grande

from the album Sweetener
- Released: August 17, 2018
- Studio: Glenwood Place (Burbank, California)
- Genre: EDM; future bass; trap
- Length: 3:09
- Label: Republic
- Songwriters: Imogen Heap; Ariana Grande; Victoria Monét; Tommy Brown; Charles Anderson; Michael Foster
- Producers: Tommy Brown; Charles Anderson; Michael Foster

Audio video
- "Goodnight n Go" on YouTube

American singer Ariana Grande covered/remixed the song for her fourth studio album Sweetener, released in August 2018. Grande's version, titled "Goodnight n Go" uses a sample of the original as part of an original arrangement but with extra harmonies and different song structures, with a new verse penned by Grande. It was written by Grande and Victoria Monét along with its producers Tommy Brown, Charles Anderson and Michael Foster. In terms of music "Goodnight n Go" is an EDM, future bass, and trap song that contains tropical and deep house elements.

=== Background and release ===
Prior to recording the song, Grande had expressed admiration for Imogen Heap's music, citing her as a musical inspiration. Heap told Billboard, in 2018, "I think for her 21st birthday — her mom emailed me somehow and asked, 'Can Ariana come over for dinner?' So she came to my house in the middle of the countryside in the outskirts of London." The two made a vegan dinner (Grande is vegan) and experimented with Heap's musical technology and devices.

When the song was finally recorded, Tommy Brown, Charles Anderson and Michael Foster handled production. It was recorded at Glenwood Place in Burbank, California, with Jeremy Lertola providing recording engineer assistance. Serban Ghenea mixed the track, and John Hanes as the assistant mixer. Grande's version uses a sample of the original as part of an original arrangement, reharmonizing and rearranging the song's structure. The chorus and bridge lyrics of the original are retained, with a new verse penned by Grande.

=== Composition ===
"Goodnight n Go" is an EDM, future bass, and trap song, with tropical and deep house elements. It runs for a total duration off three minutes and nine seconds. According to the sheet music published at Musicnotes.com by Universal Music Publishing Group, the song is composed in the key of C#Major with a tempo of 111 beats per minute. Grande's vocals range from the note of F♯_{3} to G_{b5}.

=== Reaction ===
Heap responded positively to the cover/remix, calling it "a gift", telling Billboard magazine, "...[Grande] kept tweeting about it and people were like, 'Are you going to do a cover of 'Goodnight and Go' on Twitter?' Her brother Frankie Grande sent me a text with the song, and I heard it and thought it was really great. I loved it. I'm so happy — I'm smiling now. It feels like a gift when somebody that famous picks up on a song that has had its day and gives it a second life, it's a real gift. I think she's done a lovely version of it. I love that saucy verse she's put in there and twisted it up at the end. What's not to like? ...one song on her album is like ten of my albums, so it's pretty cool. It's like a gift."

=== Live performances ===
The song was debuted live by Grande on The Sweetener Sessions. It was later performed on the Sweetener World Tour on all dates from March 18 to May 11, 2019 before being replaced by "Get Well Soon". The song was also performed during the first night of Grande's performance at Coachella Valley Music and Arts Festival on April 14, 2019. Heap also performed a mashup of her own version and Grande's version of the song during the North American dates of her world tour, April 28 to June 8 of 2019.

=== Charts ===
Chart performance for "Goodnight n Go"
| Chart (2018) | Peak position |
|---|---|
| Australia (ARIA) | 57 |
| Hungary (Single Top 40) | 19 |
| Canada Hot 100 (Billboard) | 67 |
| Portugal (AFP) | 76 |
| Scotland Singles (OCC) | 72 |
| UK Singles Downloads (OCC) | 68 |
| UK Audio Streaming (OCC) | 57 |
| US Billboard Hot 100 | 87 |

=== Certifications ===
Certifications for "Goodnight n Go"
| Region | Certification | Certified units/sales |
|---|---|---|
| Australia (ARIA) | Gold | 35,000^{‡} |
| Brazil (Pro-Música Brasil) | Platinum | 40,000^{‡} |
| New Zealand (RMNZ) | Gold | 15,000^{‡} |
| United Kingdom (BPI) | Silver | 200,000^{‡} |
| United States (RIAA) | Gold | 500,000^{‡} |
^{‡} Sales+streaming figures based on certification alone.
