= You (Kate Havnevik album) =

Studio album by Kate Havnevik
- Released: October 10, 2011
- Recorded: 2011, Poland
- Genre: Alternative rock, folk, electronica
- Length: 44:50
- Label: Continentica
- Producer: Kate Havnevik, Guy Sigsworth

Kate Havnevik chronology
Melankton (2006)	You (2011)	Residue (2014)

Singles from You
- 1. "Halo" Released: February 5, 2009; 2. "Show Me Love" Released: March 31, 2009; 3. "Grace" Released: April 4, 2011; 4. "MYYM" Released: January 9, 2012

You is the second studio album by Kate Havnevik. It was self-released October 10, 2011 on Continentica Records. In order to fund the recording of the album, Havnevik used the crowdsourcing website PledgeMusic, raising 247% of her original goal.

== Track listing ==
No.	Title	Length
1.	"Krakowska"	3:08
2.	"Mouth 2 Mouth"	3:34
3.	"Halo"	3:43
4.	"MYYM"	3:48
5.	"Disobey"	3:25
6.	"Castaway"	3:47
7.	"Think Again"	3:35
8.	"Show Me Love"	3:40
9.	"Happy Sad"	3:09
10.	"Soon"	3:57
11.	"Tears In Rain"	5:23
12.	"Grace"	3:41
