= Acacia (band) =

British experimental pop band

- Origin: London, England
- Genres: Pop, synth-pop
- Years active: 1994–1997
- Labels: Radar Records (1995–1996); Warner Music UK (1996–1997)
- Past members: Alexander Nilere; Guy Sigsworth; Talvin Singh; Ansuman Biswas; Maurizio Anzalone; Luca Ramelli; Eshan Khadaroo

Acacia was a multi-cultural British experimental pop band active during the mid-1990s. The band is most notable for helping to launch the subsequent musical careers of several of its members, most notably keyboard player/producer Guy Sigsworth, singer Alexander "Blackmoth" Nilere and associate vocalist Imogen Heap (later a solo artist, half of Frou Frou and a collaborator with Urban Species and Jeff Beck). Though never commercially successful, Acacia attracted a good deal of underground attention during their existence and were notable for their eclectic musical approach and for Nilere's unorthodox, polysexual image.

Other musicians who played with Acacia were drummer Eshan Khadaroo (Cirque Du Soleil, Blue Man Group, Psapp, Bow Wow Wow), guitarists Luca Ramelli and Maurizio Anzalone, and percussionist/world instrument player Ansuman Biswas (better known as a performance poet). Talvin Singh was also a member during the early days of the group.

The band should not be confused with the Detroit-based techno artist Acacia a.k.a. Kelli Hand.

== Sound and influences ==
Acacia's music combined elements of synthpop, electronic music, sampling, nu-soul, thrash metal, indie rock, R&B and club music. Core Acacia members Sigsworth and Nilere had originally bonded over a mutual interest in John Cage and Karlheinz Stockhausen, but retained their parallel (and more commercial) interest in "pop melodies with very strange arrangements." Nilere had first learned to play the guitar to Chinese and Balinese scales (before being introduced to R&B forms) and the band's songs were strongly influenced by this factor.

The band were known to describe their sound as "liquid music", due to the distinctive "underwater tabla" sound. Nilere once described Acacia as "a fourth world band, because the music's alien to everyone."

== History ==
=== Roots and formation ===
Alexander Nilere (the son of a wealthy and prominent Nigerian family based in the UK) had originally been scheduled to travel to America and study medicine. More interested in music, he fooled his parents by faking his departure from Heathrow Airport and subsequently settled in the London squat scene. During this period, he was introduced to Guy Sigsworth, a former harpsichord student obsessed by Stravinsky and electronic music. Sigsworth had already made a considerable mark for himself as a rising keyboard player, songwriter and junior producer on the British pop scene. In 1991, he had played and recorded with Bomb the Bass and Seal (co-writing the latter's hit single "Crazy"), and had followed this up in 1992 by working with Hector Zazou, Naked Truth and Seal's former musical partner Adamski. By the time he met Nilere, he had moved on to become Björk's keyboard player and musical director of her live band.

Initially forming Acacia as a duo project, Nilere and Sigsworth subsequently recruited Maurizio Anzalone (a self-taught Spanish/Italian guitarist who had developed a playing style blending punk and the avant-garde). As percussionist, they recruited future world-music/British-Asian musician Talvin Singh, who had already established himself as a live performer with Siouxsie and the Banshees, Björk and the On-U Sound System. Singh stayed with Acacia for "about three gigs". He was replaced by another British Asian, Ansuman Biswas, an experimental poet and performance artist who happened to play tabla, percussion and santoor.

=== Early singles ===
Acacia spent much of 1993 working on their music, and subsequently began to sell it via home-made cassette. They released their debut single, "Maddening Shroud" in April 1994 - a song fusing Balkan gypsy voices and gamelans to "an insistent nursery rhyme melody". "Maddening Shroud" was followed with a witty electronic soul-pop cover of Morrissey's "The More You Ignore Me, the Closer I Get".

Both singles, plus the interest built up by the band's compelling live concerts, attracted enough attention and then a deal from London label Radar Records. This gave Sigsworth enough immediate financial security to enable him to leave Björk's live band and to begin recording Acacia's debut album in his home studio at a basement flat near Abbey Road Studios.

=== Singles for Radar Records ===
Acacia's third single (and their first release for Radar Records) was 1995's "Hate" EP. By this time, Acacia had gained a part-time fifth member in the shape of backing singer Imogen Heap, who was recruited to the project by Sigsworth after he had heard her voice on a demo tape. Although Heap would never become a full-time member of the band, she was featured prominently on almost every song the band recorded from then on, and would perform at Acacia's live gigs whenever possible. Members of Acacia would return the favour by performing in Heap's backing band for her 1996 showcase at the Prince's Trust Concert in Hyde Park, London.

Acacia's fourth single, released later in 1996, was "Sway", a song of bisexual intrigue which gained the band some more press attention (although not much mainstream attention).

=== Line-up changes and further singles ===
Maurizio Anzalone left the band following the release of "Sway". He was replaced by Luca Ramelli - an Italian guitarist and sound designer based in London - who finished off the remaining guitar tracks on the album. Shortly afterward Ansuman Biswas also left the band to resume his solo work. Biswas was replaced by versatile session drummer/percussionist Eshan Khadaroo (aka Eshan K).

Signing a new deal with Warner Music UK, the new Acacia lineup re-recorded their first single, "Maddening Shroud". This gained the band the most interest they'd received so far and was promoted by a striking video. The band also played two concerts in Los Angeles at the Viper Room and Whiskey (as part of a possible deal with Interscope Records). A sixth single - the rave-inflected "Wired" - followed.

=== Cradle, and the end of the band ===
The band toured the UK nationally in early 1997. Originally these dates were to have been in support of Romo band Orlando. (Acacia themselves had already been loosely associated with Romo, playing dates at Arcadia and Club Skinny.) After Orlando pulled out, citing how the schedule of dates had become a logistical mess, Acacia went ahead regardless with the tour, upgraded to headline act for all shows.

Completed in 1996, the Acacia debut album - Cradle - was released in early 1997 and looked set to take the band to the next stage. However, problems with contract issues between Warner Music UK and Interscope were revealed which caused the album to be pulled from record stores at the last moment. (Enough copies of the album reached press and public to generate a few reviews and promote some mild cult interest.)

While the details of the legal problems are yet to be disclosed, they proved to be serious enough to entirely halt Acacia's career. With their impetus and opportunity apparently lost, the members of Acacia opted to split up the band.

=== Life after Acacia ===
The breakup of Acacia was entirely amicable, with several members continuing to work together on other projects. In particular, Guy Sigsworth and Alexander Nilere maintained their writing partnership, working together on songs for both Imogen Heap and for British soul singer Hinda Hicks.

Post-Acacia, Sigsworth also resumed his work as keyboard player and producer, going on to work with Mandalay, Badmarsh & Shri, Goldie, Robyn and Lamb. He has since moved into the premier league of pop sessions and productions thanks to his collaborations with Britney Spears, Alanis Morissette and Madonna (for the latter, he co-wrote and produced the smash hit single "What It Feels Like for a Girl").

During the last days of Acacia, Sigsworth and Imogen Heap had been working on Heap's debut solo album I Megaphone, for which Sigsworth co-wrote and produced the debut single "Getting Scared". Sigsworth and Heap subsequently formed the pop duo Frou-Frou (who recorded a cover of "Maddening Shroud" for their Details album). Although Frou Frou was a short-lived project (due to problems with record companies and Heap's desire to produce herself) the two remain friends and occasional collaborators.

Alexander Nilere went on (under the new pseudonym of "Blackmoth") to form the R'n'B/club music project Hexdragon with Nellee Hooper, which produced the singles "Da Boogaloo" and "Two Summers". Unfortunately, the debut Hexdragon album suffered the same fate as Acacia's Cradle and was pulled on the eve of its release for undisclosed reasons. Alternating between his own name and the Blackmoth pseudonym, Nilere then went on to a solo career and has also worked with Björk, Peyton, Saian Supa Crew and The Prodigy.

After his stint in Acacia, Eshan Khadaroo went on to drum with Blue Man Group, Bow Wow Wow, Psapp, Incognito, Jon Hassell, Bonnie McKee, Gemma Hayes, Badmarsh & Shri and his former Acacia bandmate Imogen Heap. He is one of the many members of Cirque Du Soleil. Both Talvin Singh and Ansuman Biswas resumed their own solo careers after leaving Acacia. Luca Ramelli left London to return to Italy in 1999. He now mostly creates music for commercials and fashion events, but remains very enthusiastic about Acacia and has expressed interest in participating in a reunion should it ever happen.

In 2012, Acacia finally regained rights to their recordings and began a reissue programme. Cradle was re-released via iTunes in May 2012 (followed by an iTunes reissue of the "Maddening Shroud" single in September).

== Members ==
Final lineup

- Alexander Nilere – vocals, acoustic guitar
- Guy Sigsworth – keyboards, sampler, programming, "guitar facsimile"
- Luca Ramelli – guitar and guitar treatments
- Eshan Khadaroo – drums, percussion

Past members

- Maurizio Anzalone – guitar and guitar treatments
- Ansuman Biswas – percussion, tabla, santoor, noise
- Talvin Singh – tabla, percussion

Associated members

- Imogen Heap – vocals

== Discography ==
Albums

- Cradle (Warner Music, 1997)

Singles

- "Maddening Shroud" (1994)
- "The More You Ignore Me, the Closer I Get" (1994)
- "Hate" (Radar Records, 1995)
- "Sway" (Radar Records, 1995)
- "Maddening Shroud" (Warner Music, 1996)
- "Wired" (Warner Music, 1996)
