= Mono Band =

Irish rock/electronica band (2004–2007)

- Origin: Limerick, Ireland
- Genres: Electronic rock
- Years active: 2004–2007
- Label: Gohan
- Spinoffs: Arkitekt
- Past members: Noel Hogan; Richard Walters; Soname Yangcheng; Marius De Vries; Alexandra Hamnede; Kate Havnevik; Nicolas Leroux; Fin Chambers; Angie Hart; Mike Hogan; Fergal Lawler

Mono Band were an Irish electronic rock band created by Cranberries guitarist Noel Hogan. The group, which uses a different lead vocalist for almost every song, first appeared when Hogan's website announced the name of his new project on 9 October 2004. Mono Band's first gig was 13 March 2005 at Dolan's in Limerick. On vocals that night were Richard Walters, Alexandra Hamnede, and Fin Chambers. This was followed by a performance at the 2005 SXSW Festival in Austin, TX on 17 March.

== Formation ==
The band consists of Noel Hogan and various rotating roster of guest artists who appear on a track-by-track basis.

Mono Band traces its roots back to what was intended to be The Cranberries' sixth studio album. Guest artists include Richard Walters, Marius De Vries, Alexandra Hamnede, Kate Havnevik, Nicolas Leroux, Fin Chambers, Angie Hart, and two fellow Cranberries, Mike Hogan and Fergal Lawler.

In May 2005, Mono Band released their debut EP, Mono Band EP, shortly before releasing their first album, Mono Band.

Not every vocalist was available for every tour date, with usually two of the vocalist performing at any given show. Over the course of touring Richard Walters began to emerge as the primary vocalist. With their touring commitment completed Hogan and Walters decided to work together and formed Arkitekt.

Arkitekt's first EP Black Hair, released in 2006, was described by Irish Times as "a dazzling introduction" and compared it to early Bowie "backed by The Smiths' rhythm section". They collaborated with Bernard Butler on their sole full-length release, What Makes Your World Go Round?.

== Line-up ==
- Noel Hogan – guitar, programming, backing vocals
- various guest artists on a track-by-track basis

== Discography ==
=== Albums ===
- Mono Band (2005)

=== EPs ===
- "Mono Band EP"
- "Remixes"

=== Singles ===
- "Waves"
- "Run Wild"
