= Mono Band (album) =

Studio album by Mono Band
- Released: May 30, 2005
- Genres: Alternative rock, indie rock, indietronica, electronic rock
- Length: 51:45
- Label: gohan recordings
- Producers: Noel Hogan and Matt Vaughan

Mono Band chronology
Mono Band EP (2005)	Mono Band (2005)	Remixes (2005)

Singles from mono band
- 1. "Waves" Released: 2005; 2. "Run Wild" Released: 2005

Professional ratings
Review scores
Source	Rating
Hot Press	8.5/10 stars
sin.ie	8/10 stars

Mono Band is Noel Hogan's side project from The Cranberries. Their self-titled only album Mono Band was released on May 30, 2005 in the Republic of Ireland, June 9, 2005 in Europe. "waves" was the first single was released in late April. "Run Wild" was released as the second single.

Mono Band's self-titled debut album was ranked #2 on the Best Of The Year Gone By (2005) from Irish Abroad.

== Track listing ==
1. "Brighter Sky"
2. "Waves"
3. "Why?"
4. "Run Wild"
5. "Home"
6. "Invitation"
7. "Crazy"
8. "Hollow Man"
9. "Miss P"
10. "Indecisive"
11. "Release"
12. "Coyotes & Helicopters" (hidden track)

== Band members ==
- Noel Hogan – guitar, programming, backing vocals
- Richard Walters – lead vocals (2, 5, 10)
- Alexandra Hamnede – lead vocals (3, 4, 6, 9)
- Kate Havnevik – lead vocals (7)
- Nicolas Leroux – lead vocals (8)
- Fin Chambers – lead vocals (11)
- Angie Hart – lead vocals (12)
- Marius De Vries – additional keyboards & programming (1)
- Fergal Lawler – drums (2, 4, 7, 10, 11)
- Mike Hogan – bass (11)
- Matthew Vaughan – programming, keyboards
