= Joel Peissig =

American film director

- Occupation: Film director

Joel Peissig is an American film director.

== Career ==
Peissig signed to Ridley Scott Associates production company in 2001 and was reported to have signed with bicoastal Notorious Pictures in 2004. He was in the New Directors Showcase at the Cannes Lions International Advertising Festival of 2002.

He is known for his award-winning Resfest music video of Frou Frou's "Dumbing Down of Love" (2003), and for directing the video of Imogen Heap's Grammy-nominated single "Hide and Seek" in 2005.

== Awards and recognition ==
In 2012, Peissig won a Silver Promax award directing the Showtimes hit series HomeLand launch campaign.

In 2021, while consulting with Searchlight Pictures, he won a Clio for his work on Wes Anderson's The French Dispatch.

In 2023, Peissig and Chené Lawson won a Webby for Best Scripted Podcast Series for All Things Undone. In 2024, Peissig was again awarded a Podcast Webby, this time an honoree award for "Best Documentary" for the first two episodes of How To Destroy Everything, which he produced, edited, sound designed and music supervised.
