= Ost & Kjex =

Norwegian electronic music duo

- Origin: Kolbotn, Norway
- Genres: Electronic
- Members: Tore Gjedrem; Petter Haavik

Ost & Kjex is a Norwegian electronic music duo from Kolbotn outside Oslo. The duo consists of Tore ”Jazztobakk” Gjedrem and Petter ”Hi-Fi” Haavik.

In 2007 their track "Milano Mugolian (A Thrilling Mungophony in Two Parts)" was chosen among Pitchfork Media's top 100 tracks of the year, placing 100th.

== Discography ==
=== Studio albums ===
- Some, But Not All Cheese, Comes From The Moon (2004)
- Cajun Lunch (2010)
- Freedom Wig (2015)
- Dirty Mind (2017)
- Songs From the End of the World (2022)
