= Hide and Seek (Imogen Heap song) =

2005 single by Imogen Heap

Single by Imogen Heap

from the album Speak for Yourself
- B-side: "Cumulus"
- Released: 19 May 2005
- Recorded: 2004
- Genre: A cappella; folktronica
- Length: 4:29 (album version); 3:01 (radio edit)
- Label: Megaphonic
- Songwriter: Imogen Heap
- Producer: Imogen Heap

Imogen Heap singles chronology
"Aeroplane" (2002)	"Hide and Seek" (2005)	"Goodnight and Go" (2006)

Music video
- "Hide and Seek" on YouTube

"Hide and Seek" is a song recorded by English singer Imogen Heap and released on 19 May 2005 as the first single from her second album Speak for Yourself. Written and produced by Heap, the a cappella folktronica ballad heavily uses the harmonizer and describes painfully losing someone due to a breakup or a divorce.

"Hide and Seek" first gained popularity after appearing in a scene in the final episode of the second season of the Fox television series The O.C. and in The Shooting, a Saturday Night Live parody of the scene. It gained renewed popularity after being featured in an episode of the BBC Three television series Normal People in 2020. The song's bridge was notably sampled in American singer Jason Derulo's 2009 debut single "Whatcha Say", which eventually topped the Billboard Hot 100 chart. "Hide and Seek" went on to sell over 647,000 copies in the United States, earning it a gold certification from the RIAA. It was also a critical success, and has been cited by several critics as Heap's best song.

Heap performed "Hide and Seek" during the 2017 benefit concert One Love Manchester and during her 2019 performance on NPR's Tiny Desk Concerts series. The song also appeared on NPR's 2018 list of The 200 Greatest Songs by 21st Century Women+.

== Background and composition ==
"Hide and Seek" was recorded during a late-night studio session, where Heap decided to record her voice using the "vocoder" setting on a DigiTech Vocalist Workstation harmonizer after her computer lost power. During the making of "Hide and Seek", Heap said she found the song "so self indulgent" and believed that no one would enjoy it. Although she was frequently told during recording that "something was missing" from it, she decided to release it after sending it to a friend who called it "genius" and "the most amazing thing he had ever heard". The song is written in the key of A major and Heap's vocals span from B2 to B5.

"Hide and Seek" was released in 2005. It was featured in the season two finale of the Fox television series The O.C., "The Dearly Beloved". It is an a cappella folktronica song. Heap uses a keyboard-controlled digital harmonizer (similar to a vocoder) on the song to generate distorted harmonies of her voice, lending the song its altered a cappella sound. Fans have speculated that the song was written about the divorce of Heap's parents at age 12. The song ends with a sample of a train passing by. Heap described the song as one which "doesn't connect to a genre, it's completely open", adding "It's full of color, but it's colorless. It's full of meaning, but it has no meaning. It has so much for you as the listener to identify with it and fill in the gaps." Stereogum's Margaret Farrell wrote that the song's vocal effects make Heap "sound possessed with disquieting misery, bubbling to an overdose where she sounds occasionally alien".

== Critical reception and commercial performance ==
"Hide and Seek" received critical acclaim upon its release. Writing for The New York Times, Laura Sinagra wrote that "Hide and Seek" was "the ghostly pièce de résistance" of Speak for Yourself, adding that the song "suggest[s] a kind of lovesick cyborg alienation, an almost disembodied, distinctly modern malaise". Sophie Heawood of The Guardian referred to the song as "extraordinary", describing its use of vocal layering as "startling" albeit with a "Marmite-style love-or-hate effect on listeners". For Pitchfork, David Raposa identified "Hide and Seek" as the "black sheep" of Speak for Yourself, writing, "It's gorgeous, it's impressive, it's grandiose, and it's barely there at all — just Heap's voice darting and divebombing, making itself scarce, disappearing into itself." The Skinny's Dave Reid suggested that "Hide and Seek" "threatens to put the rest of the album in the shade". Jeff Vrabel of PopMatters wrote that the song was "uniformly gorgeous" with "no beat required", adding, "Its sonic trickery makes the song lap itself; there's so much synthetic beauty in there that it comes off sounding organic anyway."

Since its release, "Hide and Seek" has continued to garner acclaim, with many critics identifying it as Heap's signature song. NPR placed "Hide and Seek" at number 147 on their list of The 200 Greatest Songs by 21st Century Women+, writing that the song was "the stand-out gem of [Heap's] illustrious career". On Stereogum's Farrell's list of Heap's best songs, "Hide and Seek" was named as Heap's best song, with Farrell writing, "'Hide and Seek' is Imogen Heap’s most devastating and haunting track to date. Whether heard via a choice sync by a music supervisor or a chance encounter over a streaming service, the song lingers for days or even years." KCMP included the song on their list of "893 Essential Songs" at number 494. Matt Moen of Paper referred to "Hide and Seek" as "Heap's greatest hit" which "not only has paved the way for the judicious use of the vocoder as an emotional vocal treatment in today's top 40 but has been objectively one of the strangest songs to weave its way into our cultural fabric." Time Out listed "Hide and Seek" as one of the best breakup songs of all time, writing that it "toes the line between poignantly lachrymose and sickeningly maudlin". For The Ringer, Lindsay Zoladz wrote, "Imogen Heap rarely gets credit for the ripple effects that 'Hide and Seek' sent through the pop mainstream," adding that the song was "indebted" to Laurie Anderson's "O Superman" and Daft Punk's 2001 album Discovery. As of 2009, the song has sold 647,000 copies in the United States and has been certified gold by the RIAA.

== Music video ==
Still from the music video for "Hide and Seek" (dir. Joel Peissig)

A music video "Hide and Seek" was released in November 2005. Directed by Joel Peissig, it features Heap singing in a dark windy set, in front of a breathing wall of back light. The video is shot in a vertical orientation, one of the earliest music videos in this format. The New York Times's Kelefa Sanneh wrote that the video "resembles a glamorous dance-pop video, except that you'll wait in vain for the beat to arrive." Peissig explained that the video's lighting effects were accomplished in camera, the intensity of the light controlled by applying pressure to the 35 mm film in front of his camera's gate in time with the crescendo and decrescendo of Heap's voice. He explained that he decided to shoot the frame portraiture as it "complimented her face and her solitude ... also the light streaks we created in camera looked better if you put the camera on its side."

== Covers, remixes, and samples ==
Jason Derulo's 2009 single "Whatcha Say" prominently sampled Heap's song in its chorus after Derulo and producer J. R. Rotem chose to use the sample. In the United States, the single topped the Billboard Hot 100 chart. In the fifth season of Australian reality competition series Australian Idol, finalist Ben McKenzie performed the song on the season's fourth episode. British alternative rock band Fightstar covered the song as a B-side to their single "The English Way" in 2008. American metal band And Then There Were None covered the song in 2009. In 2010, Canadian guitarist Antoine Dufour recorded a solo guitar version of the song. British a cappella ensemble the King's Singers included a cover of the song on their 2010 album Swimming Over London. In 2010 and 2011 respectively, Dutch DJ Afrojack and Swedish DJ Otto Knows released remixes of the song. In 2012, British pop rock band the Dunwells released a cover of the song on their EP Leaving the Rose. A trance remix of the song by Dutch DJ Ferry Corsten was released in 2013. British band Amber Run released a cover of the song on their 2014 EP Spark. In 2017, English musician Jacob Collier recorded his solo harmonizer rendition of the song. American DJ Slushii released a future bass remix of the song in 2018. In 2025, Australian indie rock band Ball Park Music performed a cover of "Hide and Seek" on Triple J's Like a Version series.

== Appearance in media ==
"Hide and Seek" gained immense popularity after being featured during the climax of the 2005 season two finale of The O.C.. After director Norman Buckley was given a copy of Speak for Yourself by music supervisor Alexandra Patsavas, Buckley suggested to creator Josh Schwartz that he listen to the album early on in the season. Schwartz then decided that "Hide and Seek" would be used in the season finale. The song was originally written to be played during the funeral scene of Caleb Nichol. It was eventually decided that the song would instead be used in the climax of the episode, wherein Marissa Cooper shoots Trey Atwood, during an altercation between Atwood and his brother, Ryan Atwood. The use of the song in the episode received praise from critics: Vulture's Lindsey Weber called it "the most obviously important" musical moment on the show, while Celina Torrijos of Much stated, "Most fans of the show...will cite the scene where Marissa shoots Trey to Imogen Heap’s "Hide And Seek" as the most memorable music moment of the series." Ilana Kaplan of Nylon also included it on her list of the most memorable music moments from the show, calling it "one of the most defining songs of The O.C.," and Angela Law of PopSugar included it on her list of the best songs used in the show. Grant Ridner of Vox described the scene as "infamous" due to its use of the song. Lindsay Zoladz of The Ringer called it "arguably the most absurd and melodramatic shooting scene in the history of televisual media" and "stupid and ridiculous and somehow (largely due to the song) genuinely, deeply moving"; Metro's Emma Kelly wrote that it was "the most memorable track from a series known for its music".

The scene was later parodied in a 2007 Saturday Night Live digital short created by American comedy trio The Lonely Island called The Shooting, which also featured the song. The Cut's Claire Lampen noted that the "infamous" status of "Hide and Seek" was "cemented" by its use in The Shooting. The sketch caused the song to become a popular internet meme, where the song's bridge ("Mmm, whatcha say") would be played over death or otherwise emotional scenes in television and film. The first parody to gain traction was of a scene from the teen drama series Degrassi: The Next Generation. "Hide and Seek" went on to be featured in the BBC and Hulu miniseries Normal People. Although Maggie Phillips, the music supervisor for Normal People, was initially against using the song due to its association with The O.C. and Saturday Night Live, the song was included in the second episode by director Lenny Abrahamson during a montage of the two main characters, Marianne and Connell. Its appearance in Normal People in 2020 caused the song to experience a temporary boost in popularity in Ireland, earning six times as many streams in the six weeks following its appearance than it had throughout 2019 and becoming the most-streamed song from the show.

"Hide and Seek" was also adapted to be featured in the West End and Broadway productions of the 2016 play Harry Potter and the Cursed Child, for which Heap wrote the music. Listed on the soundtrack album as "Edge of the Forest", it appears during a scene at the edge of the Forbidden Forest and is sung by a choir. It is the only time in the show during which lyrics are heard. The song also appears in the films The Last Kiss and Warren Miller's Off the Grid. It was also featured in the series So You Think You Can Dance.

== Live performances ==
"Hide and Seek" was performed live by Heap at One Love Manchester, a benefit concert and television special held in Manchester on 4 June 2017 and organised by Ariana Grande as a tribute to the victims of the bombing at her Manchester Arena concert. The performance was praised by critics, with writers from The Telegraph and NME naming it one of the best moments of the concert. Heap later performed "Hide and Seek" during her performance on NPR's Tiny Desk Concerts series with her Mi.Mu gloves on 20 June 2019, and performed a "jolly" rendition of the song for Royal Albert Hall's Royal Albert Home free virtual concert series on 29 May 2020. After three years of absence from the live stage, Heap joined Swedish artist ionnalee on 2 March 2023 for a live duet of "Hide and Seek" in London at EartH (Evolutionary Arts Hackney), as part of iamamiwhoami's then ongoing world tour.

== Track listings ==
CD single

1. "Hide and Seek" (radio edit) – 3:02
2. "Hide and Seek" (album version) – 4:29

Vinyl

1. "Hide and Seek" – 4:29
2. "Cumulus" – 3:34

== Charts ==
Chart performance for "Hide and Seek"
Chart (2005–2008)	Peak position
Canada Digital Song Sales (Billboard)	57
Italy (FIMI)	4
UK Singles (Official Charts Company)	125
UK Download Chart (Official Charts Company)	22
US Digital Song Sales (Billboard)	37

== Certifications ==
Sales and certifications for "Hide and Seek"
Region	Certification	Certified units/sales
New Zealand (RMNZ)	Gold	15,000^{‡}
United Kingdom (BPI)	Silver	200,000^{‡}
United States (RIAA)	Gold	647,000
^{‡} Sales+streaming figures based on certification alone.
