= I Megaphone =

1998 studio album by Imogen Heap

Studio album by Imogen Heap
- Released: 16 June 1998
- Studio: RAK Studios (London); Quad Studios (New York); Chapel Studios (Los Angeles); The Barn (Philadelphia)
- Genre: Alternative rock; art pop; electronica
- Length: 48:42
- Label: Almo
- Producer: Imogen Heap; David Kahne; Dave Stewart; Guy Sigsworth; Nik Kershaw

Imogen Heap chronology
I Megaphone (1998)	Details (2002)

Alternative cover
- Japanese reissue cover

Singles from I Megaphone
- 1. "Getting Scared" Released: 1997; 2. "Shine" Released: 30 March 1998; 3. "Come Here Boy" Released: 1998; 4. "Oh Me, Oh My" Released: 1999

I Megaphone (Note: Also written iMegaphone or I-Megaphone.) is the debut studio album by the British singer-songwriter Imogen Heap. It was released on 16 June 1998 by Almo Sounds. The album was primarily written by Heap, starting when she was 15 years old, with co-writing assistance from Guy Sigsworth and Fil Eisler. It was first produced and recorded solely by Heap and Dave Stewart and subsequently re-recorded with producers David Kahne and Guy Sigsworth. It is an alternative rock record with largely confessional lyricism, addressing themes ranging from adolescent drug use and revenge to perseverance and religion.

The album spawned several singles, including "Getting Scared", which was featured on the soundtrack of the horror film I Still Know What You Did Last Summer, "Shine", "Come Here Boy", and "Oh Me, Oh My". Some critics dismissed the record as derivative of the work of fellow singer-songwriters Tori Amos and Alanis Morissette, while others praised the album for Heap's vocal performance and piano playing. Almo did little to promote the album, causing it to be a commercial failure, and the label shut down before Heap was able to release a second album.

== Development and release ==
The writing of I Megaphone started with "Come Here Boy" when Heap was 15 years old. Parts of the album were recorded in the United States and Jamaica. Heap originally recorded the album solely with Dave Stewart of the British pop duo Eurythmics, and re-recorded the album six months later alongside David Kahne and Guy Sigsworth after realizing, according to her, that it was "over-done" and that there was "too much going on". She later teamed with Sigsworth to form the duo Frou Frou. The title of I Megaphone is an anagram of Heap's name.

The album's lead single, "Getting Scared", was released in 1997, and appeared on the soundtracks for the 1998 horror film I Still Know What You Did Last Summer and for the 1999 comedy film Women Talking Dirty. "Come Here Boy", the third single, was released in 1998, and appeared in the 1999 film Virtual Sexuality.

== Composition ==
I Megaphone is an alternative rock album. Of the album, Heap stated, "Everything I’ve been through since I was a kid had to be confronted in these songs."

The album's opener, "Getting Scared", is a "vengeful" track described by Gil Kaufman of MTV as "A spare, creepy tune anchored by a thudding drum-machine beat, chaotic piano and blasts of industrial noise". It was written by Heap about a "revenge fantasy" about a former roommate and friend who betrayed her trust by telling people one of Heap's intimate secrets about her childhood trauma that, according to her, "turned out to be real". "Sweet Religion" is a song about Heap deifying a former lover, while "Oh Me, Oh My" is a song about Heap's attempts to look for God on which she "wails soulfully".

"Shine" is written about perseverance and self-preservation and incorporates elements of trip hop in its production. "Whatever" is addressed to an ex-lover of Heap's. "Angry Angel" is an "aggressive" song about Heap's own experimentation with recreational drug use from a young age which features "saw-edged" guitar riffs, while the instrumentation of "Candlelight" is built around an old family piano in Heap's father's house. "Come Here Boy" is a "sensual" piano ballad written when Heap was 17 years old about her music technology teacher at the BRIT School. "Rake It In" is written as a screed against record companies; "Useless" was described by The Irish Times as "tragic". Heap stated that "Sleep", the album's closer, was her favorite track from the album. "Sleep" is a "spare" song featuring piano and violin, written about "the split second when you wake up and everything is absolutely perfect, and then, you remember what you have to do and nothing is quite the same after that."

== Critical reception ==
Professional ratings
Review scores
Source	Rating
AllMusic	4/5 stars

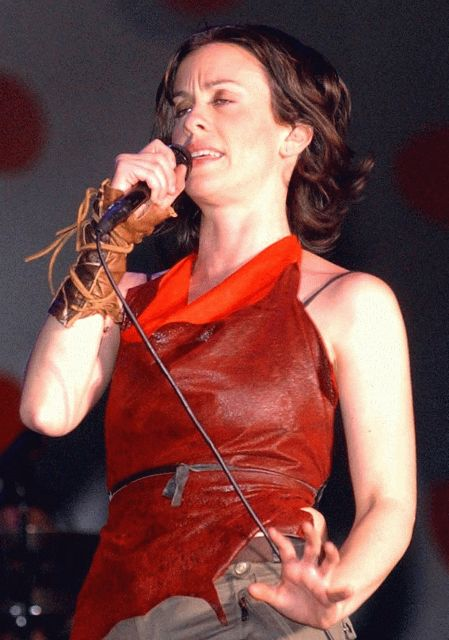
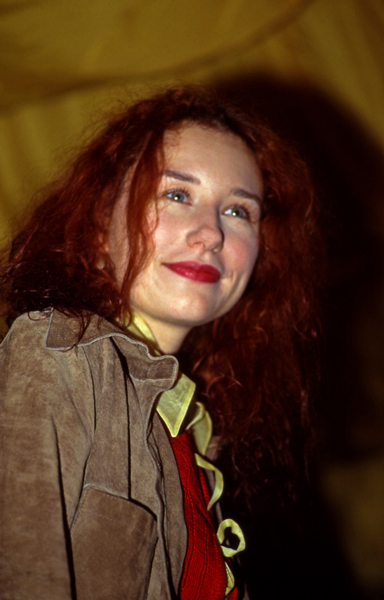
Critics compared Heap's sound on I Megaphone heavily to that of fellow alternative rock singer-songwriters Alanis Morissette (left) and Tori Amos (right)

I Megaphone was compared by several critics to the work of other female singer-songwriters, most notably Tori Amos and Alanis Morissette. Writing for Tulsa World, Thomas Conner wrote, "Heap has all the restraint Alanis Morissette didn't bother to learn...Her use of plunky piano makes tunes like 'Sweet Religion' shadow even a few Tori Amos standards." In a review for Consequence of Sound of Heap's third studio album, Ellipse, Alex Young wrote, "[I Megaphone] sounded very much like the aggressive female rock that was getting airplay at the time." Speaking of the comparisons to Morissette, Heap said, "I've never liked her. I just don’t think she is very real. But what gets me about the comparison is that people who don't like her will see this 'Imogen-Alanis' thing and then stay away from my music, not even give me a chance. That really is the worst thing about those lazy comparisons." In regard to the comparisons to Amos, Heap stated, "When Tori [Amos] first came out, they would say she sounded like Kate Bush. Now they think she sounds like Tori. Plus, when I wrote this album, I'd never even heard of these people."

For The Irish Times, Joe Jackson wrote of the record that there was "something fascinating" about Heap, noting that "the real power and poetry [on I Megaphone] probably stems from her semi-strangulated cries, the rush of crushed chords on the keyboard, the way her voice soars without restraint. Imogen has already been largely dismissed by many critics. I suspect that in time she will make them eat their words." Jackson added that tracks such as "Sleep", "Useless", and "Getting Scared" "define their own space, to a great degree". Tom Demalon of AllMusic described I Megaphone as "[a] compelling album chock-full of engaging melodies delivered in a memorable voice," naming "Angry Angel", "Candlelight", and "Come Here Boy" as highlights. Eric Hiss of The Standard-Times wrote that the album was "a potent sonic cocktail that moves from chunky grooves to classical hybrids and careens back to sinewy guitar riffs" and "a soulful, intoxicating blend of pop", adding that its songs "aim for impact".

In 2018, "Getting Scared" was identified by Margaret Farrell of Stereogum as Heap's seventh-best song. Farrell referred to "Getting Scared" as the "star pupil" of I Megaphone, and called the album "refreshing and even surprising" compared to her later work.

== Commercial performance ==
Following its release, I Megaphone was barely promoted by Almo Sounds, and sold few units. However, the album received moderate airplay on radio stations throughout the US. Heap's contract was discontinued following the dissolution of Almo.

== Track listing ==
All tracks are written by Heap, except where noted.

I Megaphone — Standard edition
No.	Title	Writer(s)	Producer(s)	Length
1.	"Getting Scared"	Heap; Guy Sigsworth	Heap; Sigsworth	4:53
2.	"Sweet Religion"		Heap; David A. Stewart; David Kahne^{[a]}	4:03
3.	"Oh Me, Oh My"		Heap; Kahne	5:05
4.	"Shine"		Heap; Stewart; Kahne^{[a]}	4:40
5.	"Whatever"	Heap; Fil Eisler	Heap; Kahne	3:44
6.	"Angry Angel"		Heap; Stewart	4:45
7.	"Candlelight"		Heap; Kahne	4:39
8.	"Rake It In"	Heap; Eisler	Heap; Stewart	3:50
9.	"Come Here Boy"		Heap; Kahne; Nik Kershaw	3:58
10.	"Useless"		Heap; Stewart	5:19
11.	"Sleep"		Heap; Kahne	3:46
Total length:				48:42

I Megaphone — Japanese issue (bonus tracks)
No.	Title	Writer(s)	Producer(s)	Length
12.	"Airplane"	Heap	Heap	4:20
13.	"Whatever [Demo]"			3:55
Total length:				57:18

I Megaphone — Japanese 2002 reissue (bonus tracks)
No.	Title	Writer(s)	Producer(s)	Length
12.	"Aeroplane"	Heap; Sigsworth	Heap; Sigsworth	4:20
13.	"Feeling Strange"		Heap	4:38
14.	"Blanket" (Urban Species featuring Imogen Heap)	Peter Akinrinlola; Heap	Urban Species; Raw Deal	5:47
15.	"Kidding" (live hidden track)		Heap	4:31
Total length:				1:07:58

Notes

- ^{^[a]} signifies an additional producer

Sample credits

- "Rake It In" contains a sample of "Sexy Girls", written and performed by Gert Wilden
- "Useless" contains a sample of "Liquid Days", written by Philip Glass and David Byrne, and performed by Glass

== Personnel ==
All credits adapted from liner notes.

=== Performers and musicians ===
- Imogen Heap – lead vocals, piano
- Randy Jackson – bass (tracks 6, 8, 10)
- Eshan Khadaroo – drums (track 1)
- Andy Kravitz – drums (tracks 2–5, 7, 9)
- Abe Laboriel Jr. – drums (tracks 6, 8, 10)

=== Production ===
- Guy Sigsworth – production (track 1), programming (track 1)
- David Kahne – production (tracks 3, 5, 7, 9, 11), additional production (tracks 2, 4), engineering (tracks 1, 3, 5–7, 9, 11), mixing (tracks 2, 4)
- Dave Stewart – producer (tracks 2, 4, 6, 8, 10)
- Nik Kershaw – production (track 9)
- Nick Addison – engineering (tracks 2, 4, 8, 10)
- Phil Bodger – engineering (tracks 2, 4, 6, 8, 10)
- Alex Silva – programming (tracks 2, 4, 8, 10)
- Andy Wright – programming (tracks 2, 4, 6, 8, 10)
- Steve Bush – additional programming (track 1)
- Greg Calbi – mastering
- Roland Herrington – mixing (track 1)
- Pete Norris – recording (track 11)

=== Design ===
- Matt Hardman – background artwork
- Josh Eve – art direction, design, layout
- Dwight Marshall – cover photography
- Chaz – photography
