= Urban Species =

British hip-hop band

Urban Species is a British hip-hop band, best known for several hit singles during the 1990s. The band's music draws on a diverse range of influences (including reggae, blues, funk, dub, jazz, ragga and acoustic folk) and combines live playing with samples and programming, resulting in an organic sound that has sometimes been compared to a British version of Arrested Development. The band's music is frequently associated with the acid jazz movement of the mid-1990s.

Urban Species' consistent core figure and effective leader has been Peter "Mintos" Akinrinlola, but the band's line-up has at various times included other producers and rappers plus many of the best musicians from the London funk and jazz-funk scenes. The band is also known for collaborations, most notably with MC Solaar, Terry Callier and Imogen Heap.

== History ==
=== Prehistory (MC Mint and Renegade) ===
The band was founded in Tottenham, North London, England, by childhood friends Peter Akinrinlola (who took on the rapper's name of "MC Mint", later revising it to "Mintos") and Winston Small (who provided beats under the name "DJ Renegade"). Growing up in the 1980s, both shared an interest in various underground music including hip-hop (which at the time was restricted mainly to its electro and rap subdivisions), dancehall reggae, rave and blues. The duo began writing together in 1988. For sampleable material, they drew extensively on the stock of jazz and funk records owned by Renegade's older brother, which came to shape their organic, live-sounding musical approach.

Under the MC Mint & DJ Renegade name, the duo recorded their first white-label release – "It's My Thing" – in 1989. The disc became an underground and pirate radio hit in the UK and also came to the attention of two high-profile New York radio stations (Kiss and WBLS) who eventually put the track into frequent rotation.

Inspired by this initial success (which, as an unsigned act without commercial backing, they were unable to immediately follow up), Mintos and Renegade eventually produced a second self-funded and distributed single called "Got To Have It". This attracted the interest of British DJ Gilles Peterson, a champion of new black British music who was also the owner of the Phonogram Records subsidiary Talkin' Loud (the label for acts including Incognito, Omar Lye-Fook, Young Disciples and Galliano). Talkin' Loud eventually signed Mintos and Renegade in 1992 under the new project name of Urban Species.

=== 1992–1993 – Urban Species develop their profile ===
The first formal Urban Species track to be released was "Hide And Seek" (which appeared on the Talking Loud Sampler Volume 2 compilation). Shortly afterwards, Urban Species expanded from a core duo to a trio with the addition of a second rapper, Doc Slim (real name Rodney Green). Slim was one of Mintos' and Renegade's old school friends, and had an MC delivery inspired by ragga-style toasting and street humour. For live appearances, Urban Species drew on a pool of live funk musicians (including drummer Andrew Missingham, bass player Yolanda Charles and guitarist Nemo Jones, as well as members of Incognito and Galliano) to ensure that they delivered full-fledged musical shows instead of DAT-based PA performances. As a consequence – and following well-received support slots for MC Solaar, Guru's Jazzmatazz project and the Stereo MCs – the band developed a strong live reputation and soon attained headline-act status.

=== 1994 – Listen ===
Urban Species released their debut album – Listen – in May 1994. The band had extended the musicality of their concerts to their recording sessions, incorporating live instruments alongside the samples and programming, and going for a spacious, organic feel to the album atmospheres. Listen included the earlier single "Gotta Have It" as well as "Hide And Seek". It also produced three more singles – the title track (featuring singer Chezeré), "Spiritual Love" and "Brother". The singles were hits, and the album received wide critical acclaim.

Over the next eighteen months, the band continued to develop their profile. They became successful in continental Europe (particularly in France) and maintained their inroads into the US via New York, where they had developed an underground following considerable airplay and an acclaimed performance at the 1994 New Music Seminar. Aiming for a truly international approach, the band also toured the Far East and Africa, where they continued to befriend other musicians and educate themselves.

=== 1995–1997 – line-up and direction changes ===
As the success of Urban Species grew, Mintos became the dominant force in the band. This in turn caused friction between him and Renegade, who was also finding the rigours of touring to be difficult. Not without regret, Renegade opted to leave Urban Species in 1995. He would subsequently follow a career as a hip-hop/R'n’B producer with Dub Wise Productions.

With Mintos now in overall charge of the project, Urban Species began to move towards a more collective approach (similar to that of their contemporaries Massive Attack) in which the group's core membership was less important than the opportunities offered by collaboration. In 1997, the band began recording material for a second album, Blanket. The first sign of a new approach came with the 1997 EP Religion and Politics. The two songs featured on the EP (the title track and 'Changing of the Guard') were both collaborations with 1960s American jazz-folk-soul singer Terry Callier, whose career had recently been reinvigorated in the UK by the interest of the acid-jazz community.

=== 1998–1999 – Blanket ===
Further album sessions followed, with the assistance of new producer Raw Deal. During this period, Doc Slim was replaced in the band (both in the studio and onstage) by a new MC called Tukka Yoot who was the lead vocalist on Us3's single Tukka Yoot's Riddim. Mintos also invited contributions from various other artists outside the Urban Species core. These included veteran British rappers Blak Twang and MC Mell'O', plus singers Elizabeth Troy, Jeffery Darnell (a fellow Talkin' Loud signing), future house star MJ Cole and singer-songwriter Imogen Heap.

Due to Urban Species' higher European profile, Blanket was originally released in continental Europe in late 1998, without a UK release until the following year. However, the album was similarly successful to Listen and received similar critical acclaim. As well as incorporating the collaborations with Terry Callier, the album produced two singles – the title track (co-written by and featuring Imogen Heap) and "Woman".

=== 2000–2008 – hiatus ===
Following the release and promotion of Blanket, Urban Species released no new material bar occasional remixes. In the early 2000s, Mintos put Urban Species on indefinite hold to concentrate on family life and other projects. During this period he wrote material for S Club 7, The Freestylers and LHB as well as various unspecified "unsigned talent". He also developed a career outside music as an entrepreneur, starting up an Overseas Property company as well as an organic coffee business.

=== 2008–present – reunion ===
On 6 December 2008, Mintos announced an Urban Species reunion via his MySpace blog. He commented "My break from music went on for a lot longer than I intended. I kept saying 'yeah, this year... this year... this year...' and before I knew it six years flew by. But nothing before its time, I always say. I got my groove, passion and hunger back plus I got a lot of things to say." Mintos' two main creative foils in the reunion appear to be Doc Slim and Blanket producer Raw Deal, with whom he is recording a third Urban Species album.

The band are also intending to carry out a reunion tour featuring various former Talkin' Loud colleagues, about which Mintos has commented "I spoke to Omar and (he) likes the idea. Bluey from the Incognito is said to be down and he's gonna speak to Carleen Anderson from the (Young Disciples). I did speak to Rob from Galliano and he's like 'err, I don't know' so we'll see."

== Selected discography ==
=== Albums ===
- Listen (Talkin' Loud, 1994) - UK No. 43
- Blanket (Talkin' Loud, 1998)

=== Singles and EPs ===
- "Spiritual Love" (Talkin' Loud, 1993) – UK No. 35
- "Brother" (Talkin' Loud, 1993) – UK No. 40
- "Listen" (Talkin' Loud, 1993) – UK No. 47
- The Experience EP (Talkin' Loud, 1993)
- Religion and Politics EP (Talkin' Loud, 1997)
- "Predictably Unpredictable" (Talkin' Loud, 1998)
- "Blanket" (Talkin' Loud, 1999) – UK No. 56
- "Woman" (Talkin' Loud, 1998)
