= Frou Frou =

English electronic duo

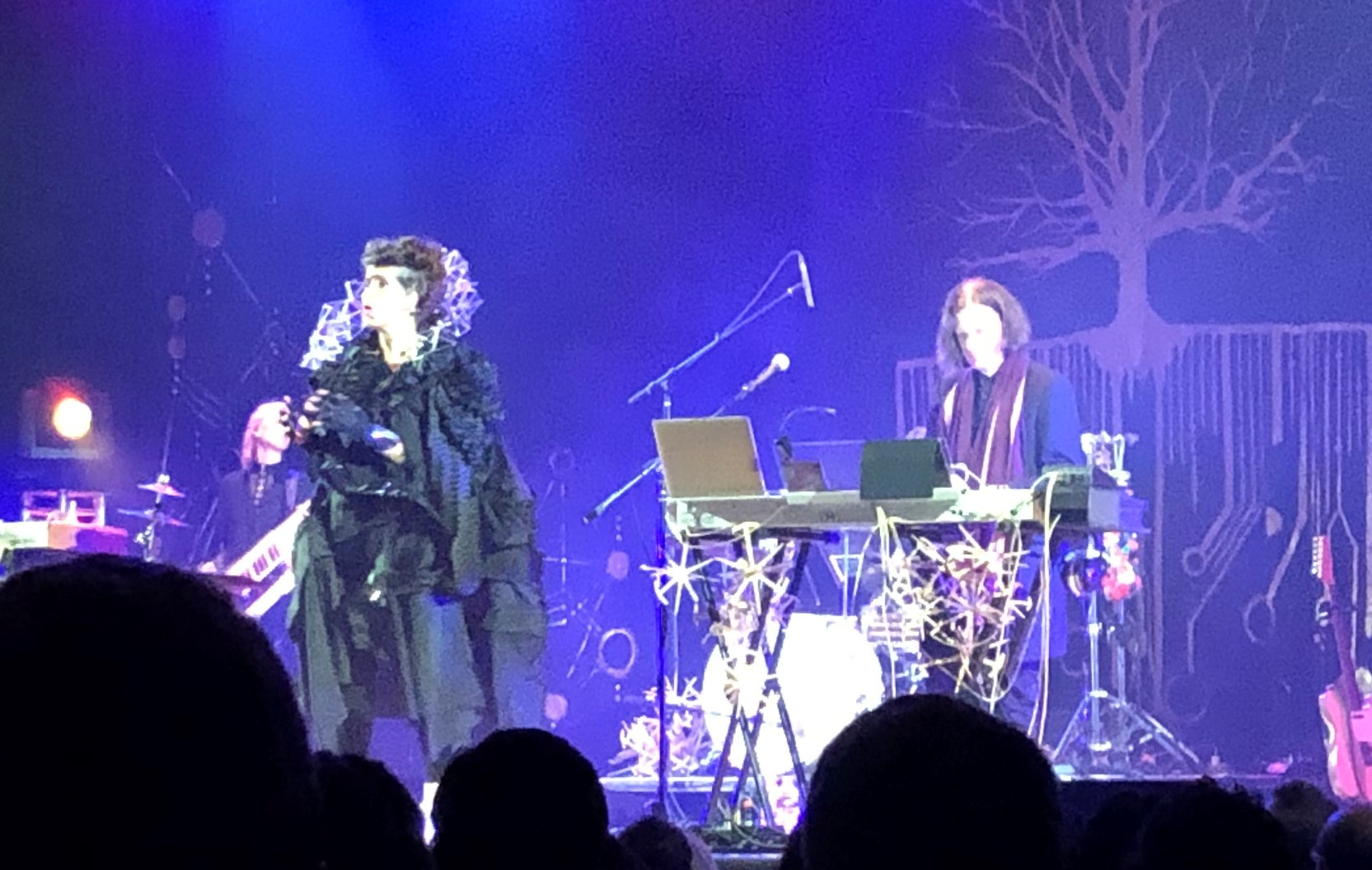
- Frou Frou performing in 2019 at The Town Hall in New York City

Background information
- Origin: England
- Genres: Electronic; pop
- Years active: 1996–2004, 2017–present
- Labels: Island; MCA; We Are Hear; Megaphonic
- Members: Imogen Heap; Guy Sigsworth

Frou Frou are an English electronic duo composed of musician and singer Imogen Heap and record producer Guy Sigsworth. They released their only studio album, Details, in 2002. It yielded their breakout single "Breathe In", which appeared on the UK Singles Chart, and also contained the song "Let Go", which rose to popularity in the United States due to its use in the Grammy Award–winning soundtrack for Zach Braff's 2004 film Garden State. Details was received warmly by critics but sold poorly and, with no plans to release a follow-up record, the duo amicably disbanded. They briefly reunited in 2004 to record the song "Holding Out for a Hero" for the 2004 film Shrek 2's soundtrack.

In 2017, Frou Frou reunited for Heap's Mycelia Tour. "A New Kind of Love", an unreleased demo of theirs, went viral on TikTok in 2021. They officially released it the following year—with it later charting on Billboard's Hot Rock & Alternative Songs chart in 2025—as the lead single of their archival extended play (EP) Off Cuts (2022), which consisted of demos.

== History ==
=== 1997–2002: Introductions ===
Heap and Sigsworth met in 1996 when Heap was 18 years old after Sigsworth was given a demo recorded by Heap and asked to meet with her. The two first collaborated when Heap contributed guest vocals to Sigsworth's band Acacia. Sigsworth later wrote two songs for Heap's 1998 debut studio album, I Megaphone, including her debut single, "Getting Scared". As Heap went on tour throughout North America and Europe to promote the album, Sigsworth continued to write and produce for other artists, including Madonna and Björk. As Heap's record label Almo Sounds lost funding, they asked Heap for a second album, and dropped her soon after being acquired by Universal, while Acacia was disbanded.

Sigsworth began work on an album in 2001, which he initially envisioned as a solo album consisting of songs written and produced by Sigsworth with features from various singers, poets, and rappers. After working with Heap on a song, Sigsworth instead decided to form Frou Frou with her, and the two began working on an album together.

=== 2002–2003: Details ===
On 15 July 2002, Frou Frou released their first and only album, Details, through Island Records and MCA Records. Heap stated that the two had not planned on making a follow-up album at the time due to their both being "kind of free spirits". The lead single of Details, "Breathe In", was released to modern rock and college rock stations soon after the album's release, with a music video starring Robin Tunney. It reached number two on the Italian radio airplay charts and debuted in the top-50 of the UK Singles Chart. It was described as their breakout hit. The 2003 music video for their song "The Dumbing Down of Love" was directed by Joel Peissig and won the award for best video at RESFest. The album's song "Let Go", which was originally written for the 2002 film Phone Booth but did not end up being used, became one of the duo's most popular songs after being included on the soundtrack of Zach Braff's 2004 film Garden State, which was released through Epic Records in August of that year and won a Grammy Award. Its appearance in the film led to an increase in record sales for Details and brought Frou Frou to a wider international audience. By 2009, Details had sold 284 thousand copies.

For Drowned in Sound, Andy Thomas wrote in a review of Details that its songs were "good, if not overly ambitious" and "pleasant enough to do the washing up to". In a four-and-a-half out of five star review, Alex Henderson of AllMusic praised Details for its "attractive" production, "solid songwriting", and "expressive vocals". Heap later said that Island Records "did an absolutely terrible job of marketing [Details]" due to being more focused on promoting Sugababes at the time. The album sold poorly and Island dropped Frou Frou from the label but offered Heap a solo deal, which she turned down. The two soon disbanded the group, though they gained a cult following in the following few years. In 2004, Chris Douridas, a DJ for KCRW and the music supervisor for the animated film Shrek 2, reached out to Sigsworth about recording a cover of Bonnie Tyler's 1984 song "Holding Out for a Hero" for the film. Sigsworth wanted Heap to sing on the cover and the two soon reunited as Frou Frou to record a rendition of the song, which appeared in the film's closing credits.

The duo also worked together in 2003 on a track for Britney Spears's fourth album In the Zone, entitled "Over to You Now". The track was written by Sigsworth, Swedish pop singer Robyn and her long-term songwriting companion, and Sigsworth asked Heap to come in and make the song more suitable for Spears, adding backing vocals and making the track more electronic music-infused. Despite not being used on In the Zone, the track was released in late 2005 on the Japan CD single of Spears' single, "Someday (I Will Understand)" and on the UK and Japan bonus CDs of the DVD release of her reality TV show, Britney and Kevin: Chaotic.

=== 2017–present: Live reunion, Off Cuts ===
In November 2017, it was announced that Heap and Sigsworth would be reuniting as Frou Frou during Imogen Heap's Mycelia Tour throughout 2018 and 2019. In April 2019, Frou Frou released a live recording of "Guitar Song", their first single in 15 years and one of two singles not released at the time of the band's initial break-up, through We Are Hear. Also in 2019, Australian musician Vierre Cloud released a drum and bass remix of "A New Kind of Love", then an unreleased demo by Frou Frou that had been cut from Details. The remix went viral on TikTok in 2021 and, by 2024, had accrued more than 400 million streams on Spotify, also garnering attention for the original online. "A New Kind of Love" was officially released by the duo in 2022. It peaked at number 30 on Billboard's Hot Rock & Alternative Songs chart in January 2025.

In late March 2022, Heap partnered with Symphonic Distribution to re-release previous material. Off Cuts, an extended play (EP) consisting of Frou Frou demos, was released digitally and on streaming platforms in June 2022, with "A New Kind of Love" as its lead single. A vinyl of the EP was released for Record Store Day in April 2023. A studio version of the "Guitar Song" demo released as the second single in May 2022.

Frou Frou re-released the song Aeroplane as a single on Spotify, with two versions from previously recorded material. In March of the same year, Frou Frou gave their first live performance since 2019 at the Greek Theatre in Los Angeles for the 20th anniversary of the Garden State soundtrack, performing "Let Go".

== Musical style and legacy ==
Frou Frou's music has been described as electronic, electropop, synth-pop, and alternative pop.

Amaya Lin of The Line of Best Fit wrote in 2023 that Frou Frou's music in the 2000s "unearth[ed] something alien and ethereal in 2002" to become "a blueprint for the electronic pop renaissance of the 2020s". Esther Zuckerman of Thrillist called Frou Frou "the undeniable champion of 2004 soundtracks" for their contributions to Shrek 2 and Garden State.

== Discography ==
=== Studio albums ===
Title	Details
Details	Released: 4 June 2002; Label: MCA; Format: CD, vinyl, digital download, streaming

=== EPs ===
Title	Details	Peak chart positions		
Title	Details	UK DL	US Curr.	US Heat
Off Cuts	Released: 3 June 2022; Label: Megaphonic; Format: Digital download, streaming, Vinyl	91	63	19

=== Singles ===
Title	Year	Peak chart positions				Album
Title	Year	UK	US Rock/ Alt.	US Adult Pop	US Dance Club	Album
"Breathe In"	2002	44	—	33	23	Details
"Must Be Dreaming"	2002	—	—	—	16	Details
"It's Good to Be in Love"	2002	—	—	—	—	Details
"A New Kind of Love"	2022	—	30	—	—	Off Cuts
"Guitar Song"	2022	—	—	—	—	Off Cuts
"Aeroplane"	2025	—	—	—	—	

== See also ==
- List of ambient music artists
