= Temposhark =

English electronic rock band (2004–2010)

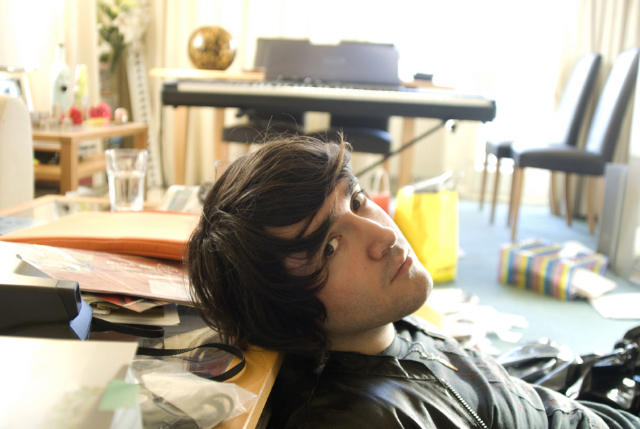
- Diament in 2008

Background information
- Also known as: Robert Diament
- Origin: Brighton / London, England
- Genres: Electronic, alternative, indie
- Years active: 2004–2010
- Labels: Paper & Glue; Defend Music
- Past members: Robert Diament (vocals 2004–2010); Luke Busby (keyboards/co-songwriter 2004–2007); Jasmin O'Meara (bass 2004–2005); Laurence Warder (bass 2005–2006); Mathis Richet (drums 2006–2010); Mark Ferguson (bass 2007–2010); Luke Juby (keyboards 2008); Leila MacFie (keyboards 2009–2010)
- Website: Temposhark.com

Temposhark was an English electronic rock band, formed in London and Brighton by singer-songwriter Robert Diament and one-time music producer Luke Busby. Temposhark were best known for their songs "Bye Bye Baby", "Joy", "It's Better To Have Loved" and "Not That Big", a duet with singer Imogen Heap which appeared on their 2008 debut album, The Invisible Line. Their second album, Threads, was released in 2010 and reached the top 15 on the iTunes UK electronic albums chart. Other notable artist collaborations include Guy Sigsworth, Sean McGhee, Youth from Killing Joke, Kate Havnevik, Melnyk, Camille, MaJiKer, Morgan Page, Avril and the virtuoso violinist Sophie Solomon. Temposhark's music has been featured in numerous television programmes, including the US advertising campaign for British TV series Downton Abbey in 2011.

== Early EPs and collaborations (2004–2007) ==
The initial idea for Temposhark started in London whilst Diament was recording and writing with producer Youth from Killing Joke. At this time, Diament also began staying in Brighton where his old school friend Luke Busby was studying visual art and music at the time. Diament has spoken about that era of initial experimentation,

Crime was one of the first songs that Luke and I ever wrote, when Luke was studying in Brighton. Listening to the clip just now brought back so many hilarious memories of us running riot around Brighton with our friend Tasha (who went on to become the very wonderful Bat For Lashes). Around the time of writing Crime, Tasha and I performed in a musical Luke had written. We put it on in a tiny Brighton theatre and had such a laugh doing it. Great memories – but I just hope the video footage never turns up!

Diament set up his own UK record label in December 2004 called Paper and Glue, releasing a series of limited-edition Temposhark singles, the first of which was their EP Neon Question Mark. The label is defunct as of October 2014.

Temposhark quickly collaborated with singer Imogen Heap (Frou Frou), received club remixes from electro pioneers including Cursor Miner, Mark Moore (S'Express), Melnyk, Metronomy, Avril (FCommunications), Carmen Rizzo and Crispin J Glover as well as hip-hop crew Border Crossing, Masashi Naka (Escalator Records, Japan), Akira the Don and electropunk duo Noblesse Oblige. The band have also written two short film soundtracks for fine artist Justine Pearsall. Diament and Pearsall went on to collaborate on an art music video for the Temposhark song "It's Better To Have Loved" in 2005. This art video was first screened in public at the De La Warr Pavilion in February 2006 when Temposhark performed live at the respected British arts venue.

A second EP, Invisible Ink/Little White Lie came out in May 2005, which attracted many new admirers, including producer Guy Sigsworth, best known for his work with Madonna, Björk and Britney Spears. Sigsworth went on to produce Temposhark's first nationwide-released UK single, "It's Better To Have Loved", which came out as a limited-edition CD on 12 December 2005. All of these early Temposhark limited-edition EPs came in deluxe packaging helping to create a buzz around the band in creative circles and with their fan base. The band themselves were never pictured on the sleeves, instead choosing striking original art images and stylish die-cut record sleeves. Around this time, Temposhark's live shows included bass player Jasmin O'Meara, who also plays bass for Zoot Woman.

In 2005, Diament said that his band name was thought up when he "woke up in the midst of a dream one night, at like 4am, and just said the word Temposhark. So it came from my subconscious I guess. Honestly it was that simple. I wanted a name that sounded strong. I liked the idea that music could be a weapon. Something powerful."

In May 2006 Temposhark released their second nationwide single, "Joy", on limited-edition CD and 7" vinyl, and the band set out on a UK tour visiting towns all over the UK. These dates included a high-profile London show at Tate Britain on 5 May and Carling Academy Islington on 20 May. Temposhark gained many new fans when "Joy" was featured on the home page of iTunes UK and in iTunes' weekly newsletter.

In 2007, Temposhark toured the US with their full band as well as completing their debut album, to be released in March 2008 in the US and Europe.

In 2008, their collaboration with rapper Akira the Don was released in US magazine XLR8R called Bang.

Guardian critic Paul Lester described Temposhark as a "classic electro-pop" act "in the mould of the Pet Shop Boys, Soft Cell and OMD".

== The Invisible Line (2008 debut album) ==
Temposhark's debut album, The Invisible Line, was released in spring 2008 in both UK and US/Canada. It was produced and recorded in London by rising producer Sean McGhee with two tracks produced by Guy Sigsworth. The album includes the song "Blame", which was co-written with producer Youth a.k.a. Martin Glover from Killing Joke as well as a duet with Imogen Heap called "Not That Big".

On 15 March 2007 at the South by Southwest 2007 festival, Temposhark announced on stage that their debut album was to be called The Invisible Line. Singer Robert Diament has said that the album title was inspired by controversial British artist Tracey Emin from passages in her books Exploration of the Soul (1994) and Strangeland (2005).

A behind-the-scenes video of Temposhark recording at London's RAK Studios was released on YouTube on 26 May 2007. The video was synced up to the full album version of the Temposhark song "Blame". This is thought to be the first preview of the newly recorded album version of the song.

In October 2007, Temposhark's song "Blame" was nominated in the Best International category at the Ontario Independent Music Awards, which take place in Toronto, Canada on 15 November 2007. Due to the album being leaked ahead of its official Spring 2008 release, it has now been made available on iTunes in Europe, Australia and Japan.

In February 2008, Temposhark and their song "Blame" was announced as a finalist in the Pop/Top 40 category of the International Songwriting Competition (ISC). "Blame" was chosen by a board of respected judges including Nelly Furtado, Macy Gray, DJ Tiesto, Robert Smith of The Cure and Julian Casablancas of The Strokes. In April 2008, the song went on to become a winning finalist in the Pop/Top 40 category.

In the same month, The Invisible Line was highlighted in The Guardian as a new band to watch article, described as "What if Kate Bush had shagged Marc Almond and spawned a monster that grew up listening to Violator? That's Temposhark, musically at any rate."

In March 2008, the NME praised Temposhark's debut album with a positive review, "What if Trent Reznor was raised on the Pet Shop Boys rather than Einsturzende Neubauten? Think these dudes... they could be your new favourite band. 7 out of 10"

Temposhark filmed four songs live for Fox TV's music show Fearless Music in the US during April 2008.

Temposhark's animated music video to their single "Blame" was selected for the Edinburgh International Film Festival 2008. Directed by New York-based artist Motomichi Nakamura, the video will be screened on 22 June as part of the Mirrorball event focused on music video and music documentaries.

On 27 June 2008, SXSW Click digital festival announced Temposhark's music video "Blame" in the top 3 finalists for the best music video of 2008. At the end of July 2008, Temposhark were announced the winner of the Music Video category, and will therefore have their video screened at the 2009 SXSW Film Festival in Austin, Texas.

Temposhark's music video to "Blame" was then shortlisted for the Portugal International Music Video Festival ViMUS 2008 and was screened in Póvoa de Varzim, Portugal between 4–7 September 2008.

The "Blame" video went on to be nominated for a Hollywood Music Award (ceremony in November 2008) whilst also being selected for screening at the San Francisco International Animation Festival (run by the San Francisco Film Society) and at the Holland Animation Film Festival 2008.

On 7 September 2008, Temposhark's song "Knock Me Out" was played on the MTV Video Music Awards 2008.

In November 2008, Temposhark's video "Blame" won the New Music Video Awards 2008.

== Threads (2010 second album) ==
In 2009, two new digital singles, "The World Does Not Revolve Around You" and "Bye Bye Baby", were released, each accompanied by a music video. Also in Summer 2009, Diament wrote songs with producer Guy Sigsworth and pop star Diana Vickers.

In April 2010, Temposhark released their second album, Threads. The album has 11 new songs. Released on 5 April 2010 as a digital download, it reached number 15 in the iTunes Top 20 electronic albums in the UK. The digital version of the album includes two bonus remixes of the title track by Morgan Page and MaJiKer and PDF downloadable artwork. The album reached the US Top 20 in CMJ's college radio albums chart in March 2010.

In March 2010, Temposhark's song "Bye Bye Baby" was nominated for an Exposure Music Award in the UK. In May 2010, the song also received regular radio play in Germany when released as a single there.

In May 2010 for an interview with UK magazine The Kaje, Diament described Threads as a "break-up album in many ways. A lot of the songs are about the end of a relationship and the start of a new life." Diament said the album was originally going to be called Fireworks but after writing the song Threads he decided that title summed up the album's overall mood and continued his earlier concept from his debut The Invisible Line of "how music can really connect people. But also of how everyone is interconnected in the world".

== Recordings for television ==
Songs from Temposhark's two albums, including "The World Does Not Revolve Around You", "Bye Bye Baby", "Frames", "Green Lights", "Not That Big", "Knock Me Out", "Blame" and "Irresistible", were featured in US television programmes such as Keeping Up with the Kardashians, Paris Hilton's My New BFF, People's Choice Awards (CBS), The Bad Girls Club, Road Rules, Love Games and numerous MTV shows, including The Real World, 2008 MTV Video Music Awards, and Styl'D.

In July 2010, Temposhark songs "Joy" and "Crime" were used in fashion advertising campaigns by Max Mara and Marina Rinaldi.

In October 2011, it was announced that US television network PBS had licensed Temposhark's song Irresistible for the US advertising campaign of British TV series Downton Abbey.

== Touring ==
Temposhark's first live appearances took place in fashionable London club nights such as Electrogogo, Nag Nag Nag, Kashpoint, Computer Blue and Drama. In August 2005, British style icon Princess Julia joined Temposhark on stage at the TDK Cross Central music festival where Temposhark were supporting Grace Jones and Goldfrapp. Her duet on the song 'Paris' has since been made into a popular electro club remix and they performed the track live a further time at Nag Nag Nag for Fischerspooner's after show party in September.

Temposhark toured the UK in 2006 visiting all major cities, culminating in a performance at London's Tate Britain art gallery and soon afterwards at the Mean Fiddler Latitude Festival on 16 July 2006. Temposhark first visited New York City on a UK music industry trade mission in June 2006 and started performing live in Europe soon after including a sold out headline gig in Paris in July 2006.

In November 2006, Temposhark began performing with their new live band, French drummer Mathis Richet and bassist Mark Ferguson. This led to the band being invited by music festival/conference South by Southwest 2007 (SXSW), which became the band's first live shows in the US. They performed live twice to packed audiences at the event in Austin, Texas on 15 and 16 March 2007. Temposhark were awarded funding from the 'British Music Abroad' scheme run by the PRS Foundation, Arts Council England and UK Trade and Investment to support their SXSW 2007 trip to the US.

On 11 May 2007, Temposhark announced their first theatre and club tour of the US. Temposhark's US tour supporting Darren Hayes from Savage Garden took place between 11–26 June 2007. They visited cities including New York, Los Angeles, Chicago, Toronto and San Francisco, with dates in all cities completely sold out. Temposhark played a live solo concert as part of New York fashion week in September 2007, it was their longest US show so far, at just under one hour.

In April 2008, Temposhark returned to the live circuit performing headline live shows in London as well as a short US tour of the East Coast including New York, Hartford, Philadelphia and Buffalo. Temposhark also announced a new live member, the keyboard player Luke Juby, who is best known for being in pop star Mika's band. In June 2008, Temposhark headlined London club night Popstarz to coincide with the launch of their single Blame and the UK release of their debut album. The show at Simon Hobart's Popstarz saw the band return to the London clubs where they first began.

In March 2010, Temposhark performed live at the Institute of Contemporary Arts fundraising gala at KoKo, London alongside other acts including Ellie Goulding, Lily Allen, Bryan Ferry and I Blame Coco.

In April 2010, Robert Diament of Temposhark sang live in Paris, France as part of MaJiKer's series of live concerts The Lab which has included other vocalists Camille, Indi Kaur, Bénédicte Le Lay and Sacha Bernardson.

== Remixes ==
Having successfully remixed the track "Pull Up The People" for M.I.A., Temposhark have started to remix other artists.

Recent remix commissions include French music star Camille (Virgin/EMI Records) for her single "Ta Douleur", Hellogoodbye (Sanctuary/Drive Thru Records) for their global hit song "Here in Your Arms" and Kate Havnevik (Universal/Continentica Records) for "You Again", taken from her cult debut album, Melankton.

January 2006 saw Temposhark remix Sophie Solomon's song "Holy Devil" taken from the virtuoso violinist's solo album Poison Sweet Madeira on Decca Records. Their remix has since been a success in Germany on both radio and at the iTunes German store.

In June 2007, Temposhark's remix of Melnyk's song "Me and My Muse" was released on Melnyk's album Silence Remixed. Temposhark's interpretation included additional vocals by lead singer Robert Diament. The remix was later added onto Melnyk's 25 compilation of artists from his label. Melnyk has remixed a number of songs for Temposhark including their cult hit "Joy".

Temposhark collaborated again with Melnyk in 2008 for his second album, Revolutions, on a track called "Hurricane", which was inspired by the Temposhark song "Knock Me Out".

In October 2009, Temposhark released a 20-track compilation album of rare remixes and previously unreleased songs and B-sides called Remixes & Rarities.

In 2014, Temposhark's aforementioned 2006 remix of "You Again" by Kate Havnevik appeared in the collection album Residue with other remixes and rarities.

== Internet popularity and podcasts ==
In March 2006 MySpace featured Temposhark as one of their favourite artists, giving the band a new worldwide platform with more than 928,000 unique plays to date. The band also have over 25,000 friends on the networking site.

2006 also saw the launch of Temposhark's official podcast series featuring lengthy interviews with fellow musicians/singers (including Kate Havnevik and Sophie Solomon) as well as short video documentaries and studio diaries. This free series of digital downloads began in May that year and is available from music stores such as iTunes and has attracted 15,000 subscribers.

In December 2007 and January 2008, Temposhark's singer Robert Diament was invited to be a guest blogger on music blog ArjanWrites.com, where he wrote a number of blog entries related to his favourite music.

In January 2008, Temposhark launched their music on the Last.fm internet radio network. In one week they had over 54,600 plays of songs from their debut album.

In February 2008, MySpace featured Temposhark again as one of their featured artists, giving them an incredible boost to their listening figures of over 70,000 listens in a few days.

In March 2008, global fashion brand Fred Perry chose Temposhark as one of their new favourite rising bands. Temposhark were featured for the whole month of March at the Fred Perry website and a selection of Temposhark's songs, taken from their debut album, were streamed on the Fred Perry website radio player.

In March 2008, the band's debut album reached number 20 in the top 100 iTunes US chart for electronic music.

In May 2008, Temposhark won funding of £15,000 from SliceThePie (SliceThePie.com) winning the top prize out of over 1,000 selected bands. The money helped the band make and release their second album, Threads.

On 27 June 2008, SXSW Click digital festival announced Temposhark's music video Blame in the top 3 finalists for the best music video of 2008. At the end of July 2008, Temposhark were announced the winner of the Music Video category, and therefore had their video screened at the 2009 SXSW Film Festival in Austin, Texas.

On 29 August 2008, Temposhark recorded a live radio session for the British Council's radio show The Selector which included exclusive acoustic song "I Kissed A Girl", a cover version of the number 1 song by Katy Perry. Having been uploaded to the internet, the song quickly became popular with bloggers and fans alike. During the radio interview singer Robert Diament joked that,

Having sung the song, I'd now love to kiss Katy Perry!

In 2010, Temposhark's "Knock Me Out" gained popularity with gamers thanks to the song being featured on the US computer game website OurWorld in level 6 of the game Dance Planet and Dance Planet Multiplayer.

In May 2010, Rob Diament of Temposhark featured in the music video to Will Kevans' single "Dialling Tone" starring British actor Russell Tovey.

== Discography ==
=== Albums ===
- The Invisible Line (July 2008 (hard release)/ March 2008 (soft release)· UK release date · Paper and Glue/Defend Music (via Pinnacle) · CD & digital download)
- Threads (April 2010) · Worldwide release date (including United States, Canada, UK, Germany, France and many more) · Paper and Glue · digital download)

=== CD singles/EPs/digital downloads ===
- Threads (January 2010 · Paper and Glue) (4 track digital download including remixes by Morgan Page and Qzen)
- Bye Bye Baby (November 2009 · Paper and Glue) (4 track digital download including remixes by Melnyk and Monsieur Adi)
- The World Does Not Revolve Around You (September 2009 · Paper and Glue) (two-track digital download including B-side, MaJiKer remix of Threads)
- Blame (June 2008 · Paper and Glue) (Single out last week of June 2008 in UK)
- Blame (April 2008 · Paper and Glue) (Digital download to coincide with US tour – with new remixes and animated music video directed by Motomichi Nakamura)
- Joy (May 2006 · Paper and Glue) (A bonus remix of Joy by Melnyk was released as a digital download in January 2007 on iTunes)
- It's Better To Have Loved (December 2005 · Paper and Glue)
- Battleships (August 2005 17 track promo sampler featuring rare early home-studio demos and remixes · Paper and Glue)
- Invisible Ink/Little White Lie (May 2005 · Paper and Glue)
- Neon ? (December 2004 · Paper and Glue)
- Temposhark Sampler (May 2004 11-track promo sampler featuring rare early demos and remixes)

=== Vinyl singles ===
- Blame (June 2008 · Paper and Glue · 7" vinyl)
- Joy (May 2006 · Paper and Glue · 7" vinyl)
- Little White Lie (May 2005 · Paper and Glue · 12" vinyl) (The three Little White Lie remixes were re-released as a Digital EP in January 2007 on iTunes)
- Neon ? (December 2004 · Paper and Glue· pink 10" vinyl)
- Play with the Minute (June 2004 · Paper and Glue · white label 12" vinyl)

=== Compilations ===
- Stash DVD magazine – Blame music video directed by Motomichi Nakamura (October 2008/Stash number 49 DVD magazine)
- XLR8R Magazine CD – "Bang (Akira The Don Remix)" (April 2008/XLR8R Magazine US covermount CD)
- Rockumentaries CD with Ray-Ban – "Joy (album version)" (April 2008/BlackBook Magazine US covermount CD)
- Robopop 'The Return' – CD1: "Paris" CD2: "Paris" 'The Most Remix' (December 2006/Lucy Pierre/Planet Clique Records)
- TSHDT – "Not That Big (Metronomy Remix)" (October 2006/Australian magazine covermount CD)
- Vice CD – "Joy" (May 2006/Vice Magazine covermount CD)
- Viva Paris – "Invisible Ink" 'Avril Remix' (May 2006/Viva fashion agency promotional CD)
- Ministry of Sound Chill Out Sessions – "It's Better To Have Loved" (January 2006/Ministry of Sound)
- London Now 2005 – "Hard, Medium, Soft" (November 2005/VirginDigital.com online compilation)
- Ministry of Sound Angel Beach – "Invisible Ink" (July 2005/Ministry of Sound)
- Vice CD – "Little White Lie" (April 2005/Vice Magazine covermount CD)
- Tank Magazine – "Crime" (February 2005/Tank Magazine covermount CD)

=== Temposhark remixes ===
- Akira The Don – "Bang" (Akira The Don Vs. Temposhark) (2008/Paper & Glue)
- Kate Havnevik – "You Again" (2006/Continentica Records)
- Camille – "Ta Douleur" (2006/EMI Virgin Records)
- Hellogoodbye – "Here in Your Arms" (2006/Sanctuary Records)
- Melnyk – "Me and My Muse" (2006/Gaymonkey Records)
- Sophie Solomon – "Holy Devil" (2006/Decca Records)
- M.I.A. – "Pull Up The People" (2005/XL Records)

=== Cover versions ===
- "I Kissed A Girl" (Katy Perry cover version) – live acoustic version recorded for The Selector radio show, 29 August 2008.
- "Like A Prayer" (Madonna cover version) – live full band version performed on Temposhark's US & UK live tours in 2007.

== Videography ==
=== Music videos ===
- Bye Bye Baby directed by Ben Charles Edwards (2009)
- The World Does Not Revolve Around You directed by Doyle Hooper (2009)
- Blame (Radio Edit) directed by Japanese animator Motomichi Nakamura (2008)
- Blame (Album Version) behind the scenes studio video directed by Doyle Hooper (2007)
- It's Better To Have Loved (Guy Sigsworth Mix) directed by British artist Justine Pearsall (2005)

=== Concert film and interview ===
- Map The Music documentary film including Temposhark, directed by Samantha Hale (TBC 2008)

== Awards ==
- 2009 – Nominated in two categories of Exposure Music Awards 2009, Best Dance Track (Joy) and Best Video (Blame)
- 2009 – Nominated as Best Commissioned Film (Blame animated music video) at 16th Stuttgart International Festival of Animated Film.
- 2008 – Winner of the New Music Video Awards 2008 for their video Blame directed by Motomichi Nakamura.
- 2008 — SXSW Sound Checks award for best music video of 2008 for Blame animated video, directed by Motomichi Nakamura.
- 2007 – International Songwriting Competition, Blame was a winning finalist in the Pop/Top 40 category, judged by Nelly Furtado.
