= Remixes & Rarities =

Compilation album by Temposhark
- Released: October 26, 2009 (worldwide digital release date)
- Recorded: 2009
- Genre: Electronica/Alternative/Pop/Rock
- Length: 60:04
- Labels: Paper and Glue
- Producers: Sean McGhee, Avril (Frederic Magnon), Metronomy, Guy Sigsworth, Milosh, Luke Busby, Cursor Miner, Melnyk, Akira The Don, Noblesse Oblige, Karin Ström

Temposhark chronology
The Invisible Line (2008)	Remixes & Rarities (2009)	Threads (2010)

Professional ratings
Review scores
Source	Rating
EQ music blog	positive

Remixes & Rarities is a compilation album containing rare songs and previously unreleased remixes by UK band, Temposhark, a project of singer/songwriter Robert Diament.

It was released in October 2009 as a digital download. The digital version of the album includes a PDF downloadable artwork file. The album contains 20 tracks of remixes of songs taken from The Invisible Line alongside rare songs and b-sides made during the recording process of their debut album.

Diament commented on his decision to release the album,

I put this compilation together in response to many emails requesting hard-to-find tracks. Whilst it was not possible to include every unreleased Temposhark song or remix, this is definitely a great overview of the varied collaborations that took place between 2004–2008, in the build up to The Invisible Line.

== Track listing ==
1. "Paris (feat. Princess Julia)" – 3:18
2. "Not That Big (Metronomy Remix)" – 3:22
3. "Neon Question Mark" – 3:07
4. "Bang (Akira The Don Remix)" – 2:58
5. "The Coffee Girl" – 3:31
6. "I Kissed A Girl (The Selector Live Session)" – 2:39
7. "Blame (Banished to Frigia Remix)" – 4:52
8. "Knock Me Out (Napsugar Remix)" – 7:12
9. "Crime (Masashi Naka Remix)" – 6:14
10. "Lemonade" – 2:16
11. "Invisible Ink (Avril Remix)" – 5:49
12. "Neon Question Mark (Border Crossing Remix)" – 4:25
13. "Crime (Noblesse Oblige Remix)" - 5:13
14. "Hard, Medium, Soft" – 4:02
15. "Blame (Milosh Remix)" – 4:30
16. "Little White Lie (Cursor Miner Remix)" – 6:28
17. "Joy (Melnyk Remix)" – 7:47
18. "Knock Me Out (Karin Ström Remix)" – 3:31
19. "Snow" – 2:57
20. "Switch Off" - 4:19
