= Threads (Temposhark album) =

Studio album by Temposhark
- Released: 5 April 2010 (worldwide digital release date)
- Recorded: 2010
- Genres: Electronica, alternative, pop, rock
- Length: 50:04
- Labels: Paper and Glue
- Producer: Sean McGhee

Temposhark chronology
The Invisible Line (2008)	Threads (2009)	Remixes & Rarities (2010)

Threads is the second and final album by UK band, Temposhark, a project of singer/songwriter Robert Diament.

== History ==
Temposhark's second album was produced, co-written and recorded in 2009 in London by producer Sean McGhee. The first single "The World Does Not Revolve Around You" was released in September 2009. The album includes 11 brand new songs with two bonus dance remixes of the title track by Morgan Page and MaJiKer. Threads was released on 5 April 2010 as a digital download and reached #15 in the iTunes Top 20 electronic albums in the UK. The digital version of the album includes 2 bonus remixes and downloadable artwork in PDF form. The album reached the Top 20 in CMJ's college radio albums chart in March 2010. So far, two videos have been released from Threads for the singles "Bye Bye Baby" (directed by Ben Charles Edwards) and "The World Does Not Revolve Around You" (directed by Doyle Hooper).

Violinist Sophie Solomon plays violin solos on the tracks "Say I'm Sorry" and "Green Lights". Solomon originally collaborated with Temposhark on their first album The Invisible Line and Temposhark also remixed her single "Holy Devil" in 2006. Simon Neilson of rock band The Gadsdens plays piano on the album's closing song "The Last Time I Saw Matthew", written about a friend of Diament's who had died.

In an interview with UK magazine The Kaje, Diament described Threads as a, "Break-up album in many ways. A lot of the songs are about the end of a relationship and the start of a new life." Diament said the album was originally going to be called Fireworks but after writing the song "Threads" he decided that title summed up the album's mood and continued the concept from his debut The Invisible Line of "how music can really connect people. But also of how everyone is interconnected in the world". In March 2010, during a video interview in New York with US music blog Hard Candy, Diament spoke about running his own record label, learning classical piano since the age of 4 and his plans for concerts. He described the new album Threads:

"There's a lot more live instruments on the new album, so we've got songs with drums on whereas before it was always electronic, so it's mixing those elements together for the first time. It's a break-up record really, it's quite different, it's very personal and emotional in that sense...but it's also got hope."

In March 2010, to promote Threads, Temposhark performed live at the Institute of Contemporary Arts fundraising gala at KoKo, London alongside Ellie Goulding, Lily Allen, Bryan Ferry and I Blame Coco. In the same month, Temposhark's song Bye Bye Baby was nominated for an Exposure Music Award in the UK. In April 2010, Robert Diament sang live in Paris, France as part of MaJiKer's series of live concerts The Lab which has included vocalists Camille, Indi Kaur, Bénédicte Le Lay and Sacha Bernardson.

The making of the album Threads was documented in a series of over 20 video blogs posted by Diament on Temposhark's YouTube channel in 2009. The album was partly funded by a £15,000 prize that Temposhark won via their fans voting for them on music website SliceThePie.com

== Reception ==
Professional ratings
Review scores
Source	Rating
The Fly (UK)	3.5/5 stars
The Music Critic	4/5 stars
EQ Music Blog	positive and
CMU	positive
The Music Fix (UK)	6/10 stars
Band Engine (UK)	7/10 stars
Fake DIY (UK)	6/10 stars
Zap! Bang! (UK)	3.5/5 stars
Hubbub UK	positive
Boyz	3/5 stars
The Kaje (UK)	

The Fly compared Threads to Scritti Politti and described the album as "Stylised, stylish stuff, but there's enough substance and savvy here that you wouldn't rule out this being Temposhark's time". EQ Music Blog said Threads is "One of my personal favorite electronic pop albums to be released this year and it's another shining example of outstanding pop music that is made independently - without a major label."

In October 2011, it was announced that USA television network PBS had licensed Temposhark's song Irresistible, taken from the album Threads, for the USA advertising campaign of British TV series Downton Abbey

== Track listing ==
1. "Irresistible" – 3:08
2. "The World Does Not Revolve Around You" – 2:57
3. "Bye Bye Baby" – 3:21
4. "Threads" – 4:00
5. "Cold" – 4:34
6. "Stuck" – 3:16
7. "Green Lights" – 5:12
8. "Fireworks" – 3:41
9. "Say I'm Sorry" – 4:11
10. "Frames" – 4:20
11. "The Last Time I Saw Matthew" – 3:50
12. "Threads (MaJiKer Remix)" – 3:57
13. "Threads (Morgan Page Remix Radio Edit)" - 4:06
