= Karin Ström =

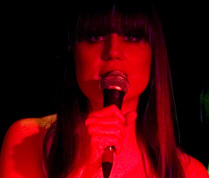
- Ström in 2007

Background information
- Origin: Kristianstad, Sweden
- Genres: Electronica
- Years active: 1997–present
- Label: Datadamen Records
- Website: karinstrom.com

Karin Ström (born 1977) is a Swedish singer and writer.

== Music ==
Born in the small town of Kristianstad, Sweden, as the daughter of poet Eva Ström, Karin relocated to London in 1997 where she started to record homemade demos, sung in English with a classic singer-songwriter sound. One of these demos reached Nettwerk America, who offered her a deal and financed the recording of an album. Karin moved to Los Angeles and a five track EP was released, but a couple of months later she got dropped, which meant her finished album never came out. After five years in London and one in LA, Karin decided to move back to Stockholm.

Back home, Karin decided to learn how to produce her own music and start her own label – Datadamen Records (Computer Lady Records) – as well as start singing in Swedish. In April 2006 the first sample of Karin's new sound was released, Sneda ögons EP (Slanted Eyes EP), which was described as dark singer-songwriter electronica. During the following summer Karin recorded her debut album, En saga om en sten (A story about a stone). It was released in Sweden in January 2007.

In June 2007, the album Ny musik för landssorg (New Music For National Grief & Mourning) was released, where Karin participates with the song "Ordlös" (Wordless). The music was first broadcast in the spring of 2007 on the Swedish national radio show Ström, an acclaimed electronica show hosted by Håkan Lidbo and Andreas Tilliander, whose mission was to pick out the elite of Swedish electronic producers to interpret the concept of grief and sorrow.

In February 2008, Karin produced and released the single Silent Night as part of the Absolut Vodka campaign in an Absolute World. The video was shot with her real life friends in their nocturnal Stockholm hangout Spy Bar. In October 2009, Ström's remix of British electronic pop band Temposhark's song Knock Me Out was released on the album Remixes & Rarities. Karin's second album, Fantomhalvan, was released on 20 January 2010. The same year she released a remix for Shout Out Louds' single Fall Hard and went on a small tour in Sweden, hitting Gothenburg, Malmö, Växjö, Eskilstuna and Stockholm.

In 2012, after six years of producing all her music on her own, Karin was yearning to work with others. A chance encounter on a plane across the Atlantic led to the introduction of Brooklyn-based producer Mark Ephraim (Joan as a Policewoman, Sophia Knapp, A Nighthawk). Together with musicians Kevin Barker (Feist), Parker Kindred (Godspeed You! Black Emperor) and Tyler Woods (Antony & the Johnsons) they recorded two songs in Ephraim's Brooklyn studio: New York and Los Angeles. These two songs were released 13 March 2013 as a double single titled NY/LA and form the first part of Karin's new project: to write music about cities.

After a three year hiatus, during which Karin started med school at Karolinska Institutet in Stockholm, Karin rediscovered the joy in producing her own music. In November 2018 she released her third album Till allt som varit dött (To everything that has been dead), again with her typical 80's-inspired electronic sound and Swedish lyrics.

== Writing ==
Karin is a fashion, lifestyle and design journalist in her native Sweden, writing for a number of Swedish monthlies such as Elle, Scanorama, Plaza Magazine and many others. For her international readers, she interviewed Noam Chomsky about tradition in language in the number 7 issue of Acne Paper, released in October 2008.

Karin is also a novelist and debuted 1997 with Bensin (Gasoline), a travelogue mirroring a young girl's deep passion for design, fashion and music. Bensin was followed up by Feber (Fever) in 2000, about a vulnerable girl's thirst for love and her struggle to put out the music her traumatic experiences result in. Both novels were written in Swedish and published by LeanderMalmsten.

In 2010, Karin started the miniature publishing company Aglaktuq together with her sister author Anna Vogel and graphic designer Agnes Stenqvist. Aglaktuq means writes in inupiatun, spoken by around 2000 people in Northern Alaska. Inspired by the DIY-attitude of independent record labels and the technological advances of both the digital book and print-on-demand, the company aims to be a new alternative on an increasingly commercial book market. The company's first titles Våld (Violence) by Karin ström and Den ryska sjalen (The Russian shawl) by Anna Vogel was released the same year. In 2012, Karin released two short stories, Audition by Aglaktuq (e-release only) and Stamtavla (Pedigree) by Novellix.

== Trivia ==
While living in London, Karin completed a Bachelor of Science degree in Neuroscience at University College London. She enrolled in 1999 and graduated in 2002.

== Discography ==
=== Albums ===
- En saga om en sten (2007)
- Fantomhalvan (2010)
- Till allt som varit dött (2018)

=== EP:s ===
- Karin Ström (2004)
- Sneda ögons EP (2006)

=== Singles ===
- "Darling" (2004)
- "Psykos" (2006)
- "Betydelsen av rum" (2007)
- "Klaustrofobi" (2007)
- "Silent Night" (2008)
- "Hon som älskade dig" (2009)
- "Hackney Downs" (2010)
- "NY/LA" (2013) (double single)
- "Älskling du är här nu" (2018)

=== Remixes ===
- Temposhark Knock Me Out (Karin Ström Remix) taken from Remixes & Rarities (2009)
- Shout out Louds Fall Hard (Datadamen Remix) (2010)

== Novels ==
- Bensin (1997)
- Feber (2000)
- Våld (2010)

== Short stories ==
- "Stamtavla" (2012)
- "Audition" (2012)
