= Music Hole =

Studio album by Camille
- Released: April 7, 2008
- Genre: Chanson
- Length: 61:03 (non-digital version); 65:51 (digital version)
- Label: Virgin Records
- Producer: Camille and MaJiKer

Camille chronology
Live au Trianon (2006)	Music Hole (2008)	Ilo Veyou (2011)

Professional ratings
Review scores
Source	Rating
AllMusic	4/5 stars
PopMatters	7/10

Music Hole is the third studio album by French singer Camille, released on April 7, 2008. It was co-written with English producer MaJiKer. In the EPK for the album, Camille advised that the title "Music Hole" refers to the main parts of her body that make music. The song "Waves" was used in Perrier "Melting" television ad.

== Track listing ==
All lyrics written by Camille except track 3 (by Camille Dalmais, Dominique Dalcan).
All music composed by Camille Dalmais and MaJiKer except tracks 2 and 10 (by Camille Dalmais) and track 7 (by Camille Dalmais, Rainy Orteca).

1. "Gospel With No Lord" – 3:35
2. "Canards Sauvages" – 3:43
3. "Home is Where it Hurts" – 4:23
4. "Kfir" – 3:44
5. "The Monk" – 6:42
6. "Cats and Dogs" – 3:29
7. "Money Note" – 6:18
8. "Katie's Tea" – 2:44
9. "Winter's Child" – 4:49
10. "Waves" – 5:31
11. "Sanges Sweet" – 4:42
12. "I Will Never Grow Up" (digital only bonus track) – 4:48
- On the CD version of Music Hole, the track Sanges Sweet has a post track gap, extending the time to approximately 16 minutes. At around 11 minutes 55 seconds, a short message from Camille is heard: "Merci" ("Thanks").
- 'Canards Sauvages' translates from French as 'Wild Ducks'.

=== Limited edition bonus DVD ===
The limited edition of Music Hole is packaged in a three panel, matte-finish, digipak with the same cover as the standard CD booklet, and housed in a glossy black slip-case, with a hole in the front large enough to show only Camille's face from the CD cover. When the digipak is removed, a small picture of Camille is also visible through the hole.

The bonus DVD, entitled Des Pieds Et Des Mains contains body percussion performances by Camille of the 11 tracks of the album proper, some of which contain vocals, vocalisation or percussive instruments; each performance ranging from 35 seconds to 81 seconds in length. The entire DVD is approximately 12 minutes in length. Whilst the packaging advertises the DVD as "The Documentary Des Pieds Et Des Mains", there are no interviews or classic documentary footage.

The limited edition also contains a 12-page CD booklet of photos and lyric excerpts; and a title strip (similar to an Obi strip) as the slip case does not have the title or song titles printed on it.

== Chart performance ==
(2008)	Peak position
Belgium Albums Chart (Wallonia)	7
French Albums Chart	5
Swiss Albums Chart	25
