= Le Fil (album) =

Studio album by Camille
- Released: 14 February 2005
- Genre: Experimental pop; art pop; a capella; chanson
- Length: 74:33
- Label: Virgin
- Producer: Camille, MaJiKer

Camille chronology
Le Sac des Filles (2002)	Le Fil (2005)	Live au Trianon (2006)

Professional ratings
Review scores
Source	Rating
AllMusic	4/5 stars
musicOMH	4.5/5 stars
PopMatters	8/10
The Observer	4/5 stars

Le Fil is the second album by French singer–songwriter Camille. First released in 2005, the album was reissued with four bonus tracks in 2006 in the United States, the UK and Australia. The title translates as "The Thread".

The album features a low-level drone (a B tone) in the background of every song, which Camille has described as "[her] note". Camille has stated that many people returned the record, thinking this sound was a fault in the recording.

On the original release, the final track "Quand je marche" has a runtime close to 39 minutes. The actual song is only four minutes in duration, but the tone extends for over 30 minutes after it has ended. The final 30 seconds contain Camille speaking in French. The extended ending was cut from reissues featuring bonus tracks.

It has been most frequently compared to Björk's Medúlla, for Camille's use of her voice as an instrument in innovative ways.

The track "Ta Douleur" placed 26 in the Triple J Hottest 100 for 2006.

In 2008, the eighth track on Le Fil, "Senza", was used by Ford in televised adverts for their Kuga SUV. The advert premiered at half time of the 2008 UEFA Champions League Final, opening up a new Pan-European audience to Camille's work. It has continued to air on networks across Europe throughout Euro 2008.

In 2010, the track "Ta douleur" was featured in the Saturday Night Live sketch "Les Jeunes de Paris".

== Track listing ==
1. "La jeune fille aux cheveux blancs"
2. "Ta douleur"
3. "Assise"
4. "Janine I"
5. "Vous"
6. "Baby Carni Bird"
7. "Pour que l'amour me quitte"
8. "Senza"
9. "Janine II"
10. "Vertige"
11. "Au port"
12. "Janine III"
13. "Pâle septembre"
14. "Rue de Ménilmontant"
15. "Quand je marche"

Reissue bonus tracks:

16. "J'ai tort"
17. "Jolie bruine"
18. "Lumière"
19. "Femme libérée"

== Charts ==
Chart (2005–2006)	Peak position
Australian Albums Chart	27
Belgium Albums Chart (Wallonia)	22
French Albums Chart	4
Swiss Albums Chart	48

== Awards ==
- Prix Constantin, 2005
- Victoires de la Musique, 2006
