= Le Sac des Filles =

Studio album by Camille
- Released: September 23, 2002
- Genre: Chanson
- Length: 39:35
- Label: Virgin/EMI

Camille chronology
Le Sac des Filles (2002)	Le Fil (2005)

Professional ratings
Review scores
Source	Rating
AllMusic	4/5 stars

Le Sac des Filles is the first album by Camille.

The title is literally translated as 'The Bag of the Girls', referencing a woman's purse.

== Track listing ==
1. "1, 2, 3"
2. "Paris"
3. "La Demeure d'un ciel"
4. "Les Ex"
5. "Mon petit vieux"
6. "Ruby" (written by Euston Jones)
7. "Le Sac des filles"
8. "Un homme deserté"
9. "Je ne suis pas ta chose"
10. "Elle s'en va"
11. "Là où je suis née"
