= Sophie Solomon =

English musician

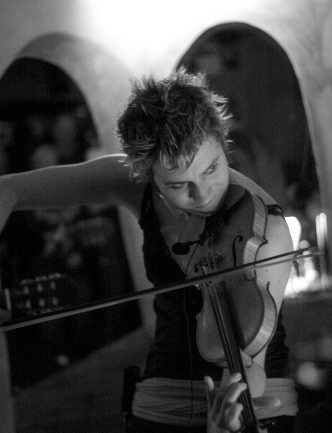
- Sophie Solomon performing in Cambridge, March 2006

Background information
- Born: 6 June 1978 (age 47)
- Origin: London, England
- Genres: Classical
- Years active: 2006–present
- Label: Decca

Sophie Solomon (born 6 June 1978) is a British violinist, songwriter and composer who fuses many different musical influences into her music. She was artistic director of the Jewish Music Institute, SOAS (University of London) from 2012 to 2015.

== Early life ==
Solomon began playing the violin at the age of two. At four she met Yehudi Menuhin and was taken to see the great cellist Mstislav Rostropovich. For the first five years she played totally by ear, learning to read music at the age of seven.

Even though the National Children's Orchestra and Pro Corda heralded her as one of the most promising violinists of her generation, Solomon "was never completely satisfied by the classical world alone, I felt constrained by the fact that the music was written down and the strict parameters of the repertoire. I felt I had to step outside of that and find my own voice."

She was one of Bell's Belles who campaigned for Martin Bell during his successful attempt to be elected MP for Tatton in the 1997 general election.

She studied at Cheltenham Ladies' College, and later at University College, Oxford (University of Oxford) graduating in 1999 with a First Class degree in Modern History and Russian. She also holds an MSc in Economic History from the London School of Economics.

== Career ==
During her time at Oxford, Solomon spent a year living in Russia, where she had a residency DJing ragga jungle music at Kitai Gorod's Propaganda nightclub. Solomon developed a passion for the traditional musics of Eastern Europe, especially klezmer and gypsy styles, and travelled widely in the region, absorbing new sounds and influences along the way. This led to her becoming a founder member of Oi Va Voi, who were described as "one of the most exciting bands in Britain today" by The Daily Telegraph. It was with this band that she rediscovered her love for the violin.

Famed for their live appearances and Solomon's on-stage pyrotechnics, the band's debut album, Laughter Through Tears, received rave reviews, was voted in the top ten albums of 2004 by The New York Times, and won them two nominations in BBC Radio 3's annual awards for world music and an Edison Album of the Year Award 2003.

Solomon's collaboration with Josh "Socalled" Dolgin – Solomon & Socalled's HipHopKhasene – with special guests David Krakauer, Michael Alpert and Frank London, a traditional klezmer wedding hip-hop style, received the Preis der Deutschen Schallplattenkritik Album of the Year award 2004.

She became increasingly in demand, lending her violin playing to the likes of Rufus Wainwright, KT Tunstall, Paul Weller, Killing Joke and Theodore Bikel. Solomon teaches klezmer music all over the world, most recently at the School of Oriental and African Studies (University of London), the Royal Academy of Music and Weimar Conservatoire. She is on the artistic advisory committee of the Genius of the Violin festival, the only such event in the world devoted entirely to the instrument. In February 2006 she appeared alongside Roby Lakatos, Nikolaj Znaider and Mark O'Connor in the Genius of the Violin concert at the Barbican Hall with the London Symphony Orchestra, performing special orchestrations of her own compositions. Martha Wainwright made an appearance as Sophie's special guest at this concert singing Lazarus.

In May 2006 Solomon released her debut solo album, Poison Sweet Madeira, on Decca Records – an eclectic mix of klezmer, folk and pop and featuring the vocal talents of Richard Hawley, Ralph Fiennes and KT Tunstall. Her regular touring band comprises Ian Watson (accordion), Daniel Glendining (guitar/vocals), Grant Windsor (piano), Ali Friend (bass) and Stevie Pilgrim (drums).

She has appeared and worked with musicians as diverse as The Klezmatics, Gary Lucas, Bacon & Quarmby, Luke Toms, The Real Tuesday Weld, Nayekhovichi, Alan Bern & Brave Old World, Maurice El Medioni, the London Symphony Orchestra, th'Legendary Shackshakers, the Israeli Sinfonietta, Hazmat Modine, Avishai Cohen, Yasmin Levy, Ludovico Einaudi, Marius de Vries, Kipper, Temposhark, Jon Thorne, Smadj, Ben Parker (formerly of Ben & Jason) and Besh o droM.

In 2006, Solomon was Musical Arranger on Lindsay Posner's critically acclaimed production of Fiddler on the Roof starring Henry Goodman, which transferred to the Savoy Theatre on London's West End in May 2007.

In early 2007 Solomon premiered Wiesenberg's Suite Concertante for Klezmer and Classical Violins with Dora Schwarzberg & the Yehudi Menuhin School Orchestra. In 2008 she was a featured musician for the premiere at London's South Bank Centre of Marius de Vries's composition Q4 based on T S Eliot's Four Quartets, commissioned by the Rafael Bonachela Dance Company.

She contributes regularly to The Strad magazine.

She is currently working on her second solo disc for Sony/ATV, produced by Marius de Vries, and composing music for various film projects. She composed the score for Vlast (Power), a film about Mikhail Khodorkovsky, which has been screened at international film festivals, including Zagrebdox, where it won a Special Recognition Award, and as part of Al Jazeera's Witness strand. In 2009, Solomon was composer, arranger and musical director for Our Class, a new play by Tadeusz Slobodzianek directed by Bijan Sheibani at the Royal National Theatre in London. In 2010, she was Composer for 'Off the Endz' by Bola Agbaje at the Royal Court Theatre in London and appeared as featured folk fiddler in London Assurance at the Royal National Theatre directed by Nicholas Hytner.

In November 2011, she was appointed artistic director of the Jewish Music Institute, SOAS, effective from January 2012. As part of her work at Jewish Music Institute, Solomon commissioned composer Jocelyn Pook, together with dramaturg Emma Bernard and video artist Dragan Aleksic, to create Drawing Life, a new multimedia work inspired by the poems and drawings of the child inmates of Theresienstadt Ghetto. The work, funded by the Arts Council and winner of the PRS David Bedford Award for Music Education, features singers Melanie Pappenheim and Lorin Sklamberg of The Klezmatics and received a preview performance in 2014 at Kings Place in London.

Solomon is also Founder and Governor of Hackney New Primary School, a new Outstanding free school focused on music, which opened in Hackney in September 2015.

In December 2014, the Financial Times named Solomon one of the 50 most powerful people working part-time in the UK.

== Discography ==
- Digital Folklore (Voi Records, 2002)
- Laughter Through Tears (Outcaste, 2003)
- Solomon&Socalled's HipHopKhasene (Piranha, 2003)
- Poison Sweet Madeira (Decca Records, 2006)
- Lazarus (single, Decca Records, 2006)
- Stop the Parade (Sophie Solomon, 2016)

== Contributions ==
- 'Klezmer', Timeshift documentary, BBC4 2012
- Find the Torch, Burn the Plans – Paul Weller Live at the Royal Albert Hall DVD
- Special Guest with Paul Weller at the Royal Albert Hall, May 2010
- Threads – Temposhark 2010 (violin solos on songs Say I'm Sorry and Green Lights)
- Solo violin and viola on Mrs Klein by Nicholas Wright (playwright) at the Almeida Theatre, London 2009
- Special Guest with Paul Weller at Island Records 50th Birthday Celebrations, Shepherd's Bush Empire 2009
- Solo violinist on Easy Virtue directed by Stephan Elliott, new film version of Noël Coward play starring Jessica Biel, Colin Firth and Kristin Scott Thomas, with score by Marius de Vries
- Fiddler on the Roof- Jerry Bock & Joseph Stein – Musical Arranger of critically acclaimed production @ Crucible Theatre, Sheffield, & Savoy Theatre, West End, London, directed by Lindsay Posner and starring Henry Goodman as Tevye, 2006/7
- World Premiere of Menachem Wiesenberg's Suite Concertante for Klezmer and Classical Violins, commissioned for Sophie by the Jewish Music Institute, performed with Dora Schwarzberg & the Yehudi Menuhin School Orchestra, London 2007
- "Fools with Money", Luke Toms, Island Records 2007, produced by Marius de Vries
- The Invisible Line – Temposhark, 2007/2008
- Natureboy – Amanda Ghost, 2007
- Chagall Illuminated, a Spiel-commissioned project of animation & improvisation inspired by Chagall paintings, together with Max Reinhardt, Tamar Osborn, Ben Mandelson and Lemez Lovas, 2007
- Socalled Seder Live 2007
- Want Two – Rufus Wainwright, DreamWorks 2005, produced by Marius de Vries
- Music From The Winery – David Krakauer, Tzadik 2005
- Redbird – Heather Nova, V2 2005
- Another Run Around the Sun – Ben Taylor, Independiente 2005, produced by Bacon & Quarmby

== Awards ==
- Preis der Deutschen Schallplattenkritik Album of the Year 2004 – Solomon & Socalled's HipHopkhasene (Piranha)
- Edison World Music Album of the Year 2004 – Oi Va Voi Laughter Through Tears (Outcaste)
- Timewise Power Part Time 2014 as Sophie Jankovic

== Poison Sweet Madeira track list ==
1. "Holy Devil"
2. "Burnt by the Sun" (with Richard Hawley)
3. "Poison Sweet Madeira"
4. "Lazarus" (with KT Tunstall)
5. "A Light That Never Dies" (with Ralph Fiennes)
6. "Hazy"
7. "I Can Only Ask Why"
8. "Meditation on Dvořák's Slavonic Fantasy"
9. "Pin Pricks And Gravy Stains"
