= Revbensstäderna =

Book by Eva Ström

- First edition
- Author: Eva Ström
- Language: Swedish
- Genre: poetry
- Published: 2002
- Publisher: Albert Bonniers förlag
- Publication place: Sweden
- Awards: Nordic Council's Literature Prize of 2003

Revbensstäderna (lit. The Rib Cities) is a 2002 poetry collection by Swedish poet Eva Ström. It won the Nordic Council's Literature Prize in 2003.
