= MaJiKer =

British songwriter-producer and performer

- Also known as: Matthew Ker
- Origin: England
- Genres: Pop, electronic, indie, contemporary classical
- Years active: 2005–present
- Website: www.majiker.com

Matthew Ker, known by his stage name MaJiKer, is a British songwriter-producer and performer. Born in Birmingham, he resides in London and works internationally, having lived for many years in Paris.

== Music career ==
=== Collaborations ===
MaJiKer has worked extensively as a songwriter-producer and live performer, with a special interest in vocal production and co-writing material.

After graduating from Dartington College of Arts, MaJiKer produced the double platinum-selling album Le Fil with French singer/songwriter Camille and the pair collaborated again when producing and co-writing its platinum-selling follow-up Music Hole. He performed on stage with Camille on her international tour for Le Fil during 2005–2006 and was musical director and performer on the Music Hole tour in 2008-2009. MaJiKer also co-wrote songs with Camille for her albums Ilo Veyou (2011) and Ouï (2017). His work with Camille has won awards including the Prix Constantin, several Victoires de la Musique and BBC Radio 3 Awards for World Music.

In 2010, he collaborated with producer Valgeir Sigurdsson on the arrangements for the debut album by Italian artist Erica Mou, with whom he subsequently toured internationally.

His other studio collaborations have included artists such as Emmelie de Forest, David Byrne and Fatboy Slim, You Are Wolf, Zaza Fournier, juice vocal ensemble, Melissa Laveaux, Maya Barsony, and China Moses. He has remixed artists including Fever Ray, Nico Muhly, Jenny Wilson, Melnyk, Temposhark, Nicolette and Client.

In 2017 MaJiKer performed as the beatbox soloist in Anna Meredith's Concerto for Beatboxer and Orchestra with the Southbank Sinfonia.

After signing a publishing deal with Universal Music Publishing he started regularly co-writing songs with other artists, songwriters and producers. American singer-songwriter Allyson Ezell became a frequent collaborator, and together they wrote the English version of Mercy by Madame Monsieur (which become France entry in the Eurovision Song Contest 2018), as well as songs for electronic acts Jabberwocky, Namic, Les Gordon, Joyzu and TEPR.

In 2018, he directed vocalists for the spoof charity song 'Save Our Trolls' for BBC Radio 4's Woman's Hour which featured performances by Charlotte Church, Miranda Hart, Edith Bowman and Andy Serkis.

In late 2019, he collaborated with beatbox collective Berywam, co-producing and co-writing tracks on the debut album.

=== Solo albums ===
MaJiKer's solo debut album Body-Piano-Machine was released in April 2009. All the sounds on the record came from the body (body percussion, human beatbox and singing voice), an acoustic piano, and a specific machine - a Yamaha keyboard PSS 270 which was the keyboard from his childhood.

His second solo album entitled The House of Bones was released on Halloween 2011 on Alche-my. The album was recorded in Valgeir Sigurdsson's Greenhouse Studios, and in a remote summer house on a mountain in Laugarvatn, Iceland. The project was inspired by ghost stories, haunted house movies from the 1940s and Norse mythology. He toured both albums, performing several times in Paris, and also in the UK including gigs at the Institute of Contemporary Arts in London and The Hare & Hounds in Birmingham.

In 2014 he released the collaborative album project NORTH which consisted of Nordic folk melodies with new lyrics in English written by MaJiKer himself. He also arranged and produced the album which featured 16 guest vocalists including Jennie Abrahamson, Sam Lee, David Thomas Broughton, China Moses, Thea Hjelmeland, Gaggle and Ellekari Sander.

In 2019 he created two albums of original songs entirely made from human body sounds exclusively for Felt Production Music, which have been used in TV and radio shows internationally.

On the meditation app Insight Timer, throughout 2020 MaJiKer released his 'Serenetudes' a series of 24 tracks each created using a single vocal note which is sculpted into an hour-long immersive soundscape.

== Selected discography ==
=== Albums ===
- Martin Mey - Words (Without) - (2019, Internexterne)
- Claude Violante - Armani - (2019, Panenka Music)
- TEPR - Technosensible - (2019, Parlophone / Warner Music)
- Coco Bans - Fantasy & Parables - (EP) - (2019, Warner)
- You Are Wolf - Keld - (2018, Firecrest Records)
- Zaza Fournier - Le Déluge - (EP) - (2018, Le Rat des Villes)
- Allyson Ezell - The Ease of Remembering Sparks - EP - (2015, Universal)
- Zaza Fournier - Le Départ - (2015, Verycords)
- The North Project - NORTH - (2014, Alche-my)
- Celina Bostic - Zu fuss - (2014, Rough Trade Germany)
- You Are Wolf - Hawk To The Hunting Gone - (2014, Stone Tape)
- MaJiKer - The House of Bones - (2011, Alche-my)
- Erica Mou - È - (2011, Sugar)
- MaJiKer - Body Piano Machine - (2009, Gaymonkey Records)
- Camille - Music Hole - (2008, Virgin)
- Camille - Le Fil - (2005, Virgin)

=== Songs ===
- Anna Zak - Call It Out - (2019, Cool Beanz)
- Erica Mou - A Ring In The Forest - (2019, Beating Drum)
- Alyusha - 48 - (2019, Tsuru)
- Elisa Erka - Corps Météo - (2019, Universal)
- Inni K - Edges - (2018)
- Charl XCX - Lucky (Ö Remix) - (2018, Asylum)
- TEPR - Why Don't You ft. JAFAAR - (2018, Parlophone / Warner Music)
- Claude Violante - Armani - (2018, Panenka)
- Coco Bans - Make It Up - (2018, Coco Bans)
- Emmelie De Forest - History - (2018, Cosmos)
- Woman's Hour - Save Our Trolls - (2018, BBC Radio 4)
- Namic - Brush It Off ft. Allyson Ezel' - (2018, Soonvibes)
- Avenue Sky - We Can Run - (2018, amuse)
- Camille - Lasso - (2017, Because Music)
- Camille - Fille à papa - (2017, Because Music)
- Emmelie De Forest - Sanctuary - (2017, Cosmos)
- Jabberwocky - Lighter Day ft. Allyson Ezell - (2017, Pain Surprises)
- Annica Milán & Kimmo Blom - Good Enough - (2016, UMK)
- Emily Portman - Hollow Feather - (2015, Furrow Records)
- Nitin Sawneny - October Daze (French version) - (2015, London Undersound)
- juice vocal ensemble - Only Girl In The World - (2014, Nonclassical)
- Cecilia Nordlund - Något mörkt - (2014, Margit Music)
- Erica Mou - Nella Vasca Da Bagno Del Tempo - (2012, Sugar)
- Camille - My Man Is Married But Not To Me - (2011, Virgin/EMI)
- Maya Barsony - La Funambule - (2011, Columbia Records)
- David Bryne & Fatboy Slim - Pretty Face - (2010, Todomundo/Nonesuch)
- Melissa Laveaux - Dodo Titit - (2008, No Format)
- Maya Barsony - Boomerang - (2008, Sony BMG Music Entertainment)
