= Eva Ström =

Swedish writer (born 1947)

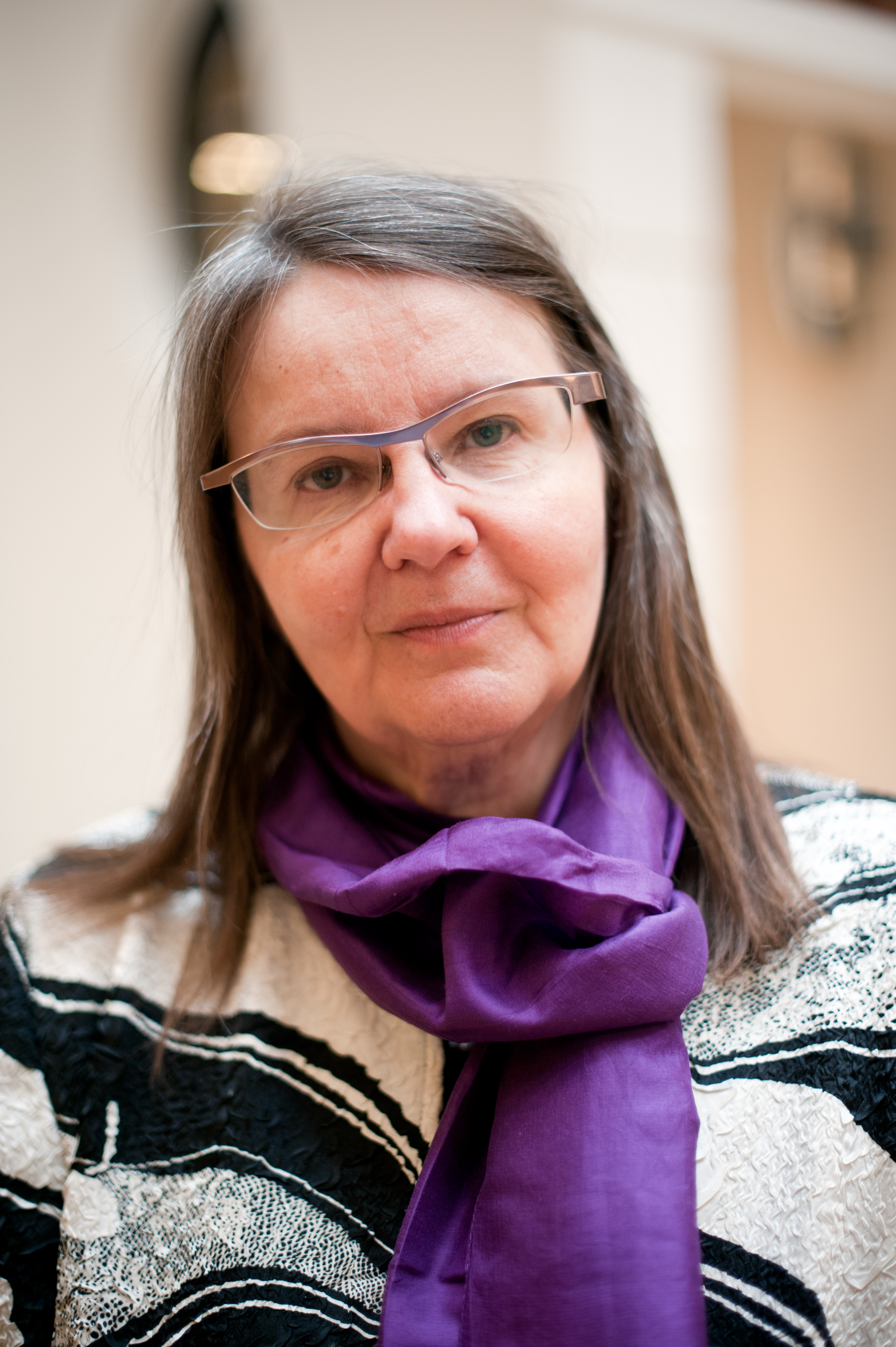
- Ström in 2011
- Born: 4 January 1947 (age 79); Lidingö, Sweden
- Children: Karin
- Writing career
- Period: 1977–
- Notable work: Revbensstäderna

Eva Ström (born 4 January 1947 in Lidingö, Stockholm County) is a Swedish lyricist, novelist, biographer, and literary critic. She made her literary debut in 1977 with the poetry collection Den brinnande zeppelinaren. Ström trained as a physician and worked in the medical profession 1974–1988 before becoming a full-time author.

She was awarded the Nordic Council's Literature Prize in 2003 for the poetry collection Revbensstäderna ("The Rib Cities"). In January 2010, she was elected a member of the Royal Swedish Academy of Sciences.

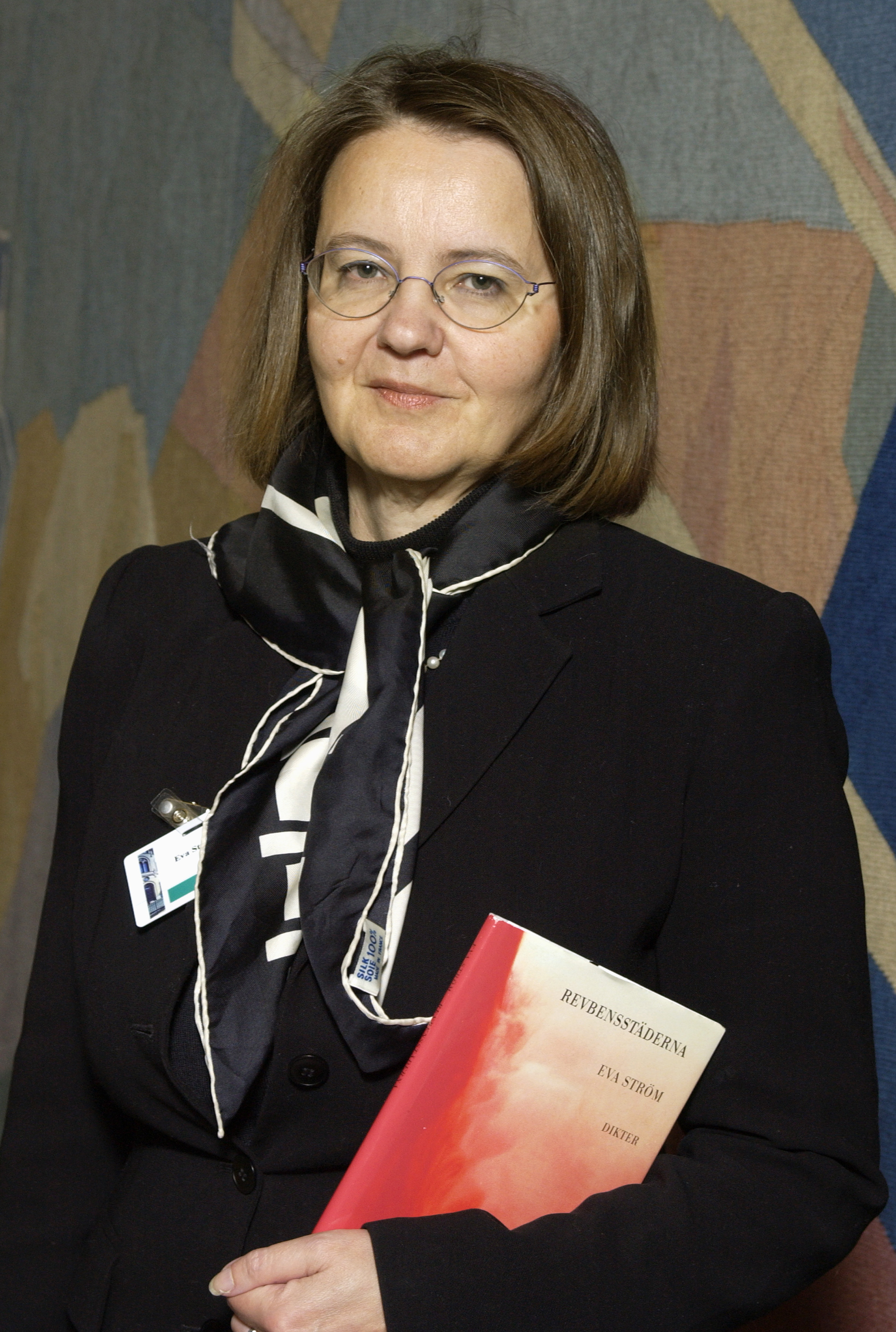
Ström in 2003

She is the mother of Karin Ström.

== Awards ==
- Nordic Council's Literature Prize 2003
- Jan Smrek Prize 2018, Slovakia
