= Akira the Don =

British musician, DJ, and producer

Akira The Don
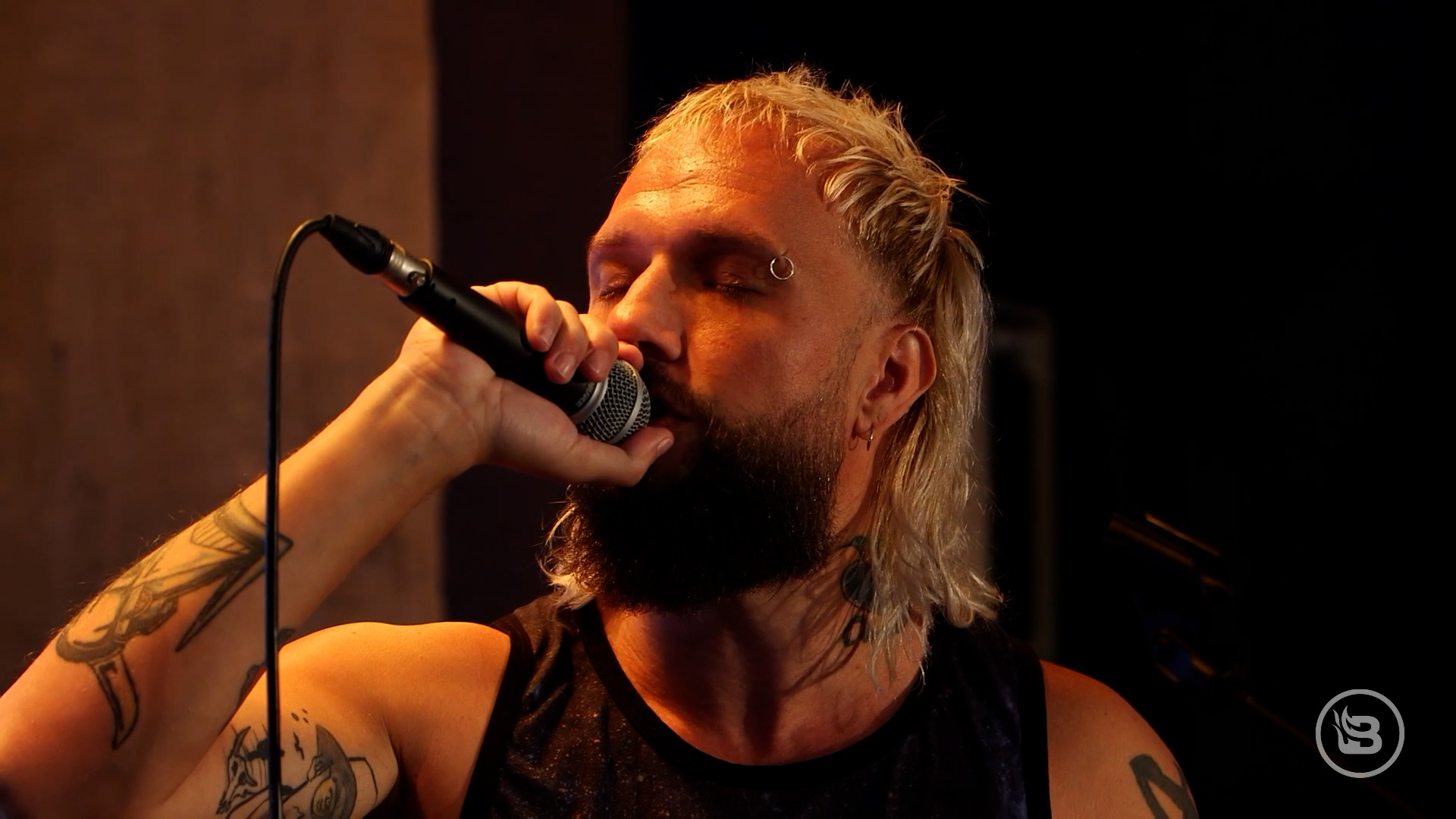
- Akira singing during a set on the Normal World Show

Background information
- Born: Adam Jan Narkiewicz
- Origin: UK
- Genres: Lo-fi; EDM; hip hop; trap
- Occupations: Musician; DJ; record producer
- Years active: 2004–present
- Labels: Meaningwave (2020–present); Living in the Future (2009–2020); Something in Construction (2004–2009); Interscope (2005–2006)
- Website: www.meaningwave.com

Adam Jan Narkiewicz, known professionally as Akira the Don is an English musician, DJ, producer, and YouTuber. His debut album When We Were Young was released in 2006. He has released several mixtapes such as The Life Equation in 2011.

== Early life ==
Adam Jan Narkiewicz was born in West Bromwich and raised in North Wales, for most of his career he lived in London.

== Career ==
=== Rapper and producer ===
Prior to launching a solo career, Akira the Don was a member of hip-hop group Crack Village, another member being Lois Winstone. In 2006, Akira rapped on Brave Captain's album Distractions. He released his first album When We Were Young the same year. He lists influences including Ice Cube, Adam Ant, Morrissey, Leonard Cohen, David Bowie and the Wu-Tang Clan. Akira has produced songs for a number of artists including two top forty hits for Lethal Bizzle along with songs for Newham Generals' Footsie, Big Narstie, Envy, G-Mane, Littles, Marvin The Martian, Issue, and Time.

In May 2011, he released his second LP, The Life Equation. The album is co-produced with Stephen Hague and features collaborations with Gruff Rhys (of Super Furry Animals) and Envy. Akira often produced his own videos. In 2012, Akira performed and hosted panels at Grant Morrison’s MorrisonCon alongside My Chemical Romance’s Gerard Way. Grant had said that Akira was his favourite artist.

In 2011, Akira collaborated with Chilly Gonzales on mixtape. In 2014, he moved to Los Angeles. By March, he released A.T.D.R.I.P.. He played his final gig as a traditional rap artist in London on 19 May. In 2015, Akira produced a cover of Adamski's "Killer" featuring Grant Morrison. In 2016, he released a remix of the Stranger Things theme.

Since 2017, Akira the Don has been integrating philosophically inspired lyrical content into his music. He created and developed the Meaningwave Universe which is aimed at inspiring people to find wholesomeness in their lives, and promotes the ideas of peak performance or flow consciousness. He's sampled soundbites from Jordan Peterson, Alan Watts, Joe Rogan, Elon Musk, Fred Rogers, Anthony Bourdain, and others. In February 2018, Akira entered what he deemed a new era of "hyper productivity", and has since released 109 albums.

In September 2021, Scott Adams appeared as a guest on the Fox News Channel talk show Gutfeld! to promote his album with Akira The Don, The Basket Case Theory.

In 2021, Jordan Peterson appeared on Akira's podcast, an experience he went on to discuss with numerous podcasters.

=== Appearances ===
In October 2014 Akira relocated to Los Angeles, where he formed the party rap duo MIDNITEMEN with long time collaborator and nightclub organizer Wade Crescent, and began DJing every week in Hollywood nightspots like The Roosevelt Hotel, Blind Dragon, Hooray Henrys and Bootsy Bellows. The latter is co-owned by David Arquette, for whom Akira provided accent coaching for the actor's role in a stage production of Sherlock Holmes.

In December 2015, MIDNITEMEN produced an official remix of the song "Sunrise" by the band The Kooks. This remix would then be featured on their album Hello, What's Your Name?

As resident DJ at Blind Dragon, he DJed parties for the likes of The Weeknd, Nylon Magazine and Harry Styles. He DJed for Justin Bieber at Hooray Henrys following his VMAs performance.

In November 2022, Akira performed at Decentraland's Metaverse Music Festival, sharing the virtual stage with artists such as Björk, Ozzy Osbourne, Dillon Francis, Soulja Boy, Izzy Bizu, Megadeth, and many more. The event brought together a diverse lineup of global talent, showcasing Akira’s music in the environment of the metaverse.

In early October 2023, Akira performed the entire ANTHEM EP—a commissioned piece by the Atlas Society at the Atlas Society's 7th Annual Fundraising Gala, an event that brought together prominent figures from the worlds of business and philosophy. Notable attendees included Jennifer Grossman, CEO of the Atlas Society, billionaire entrepreneur Ricardo Salinas, and tech entrepreneur Michael Saylor. Akira appeared as a guest on Blaze TV's "The Normal World Show." During the episode, Akira performed a special set near the end, featuring a song that incorporated the words of Ayn Rand, blending his unique musical style with philosophical themes.

In February 2024, Akira appeared as a guest on the "Nights with Chris Boyle segment of OANN TV. He discussed the creation, cultural impact, and creative process of Meaningwave, highlighting its blend of music, motivational speeches, and philosophical ideas. The interview showcased Meaningwave’s growing influence on music and internet culture.

In March 2024, Akira made a return appearance on Blaze TV's "The Normal World Show." This time, he performed a song with lyrics adapted from The Meditations Of Marcus Aurelius, taken from his album MEDITATIONS VOL II, that adapts Book 3 of the Meditations into an album, MEDITATIONS VOL II. This was the follow up to MEDITATIONS VOL 1, which was described as “excellent” by Robin Warterfield in his Annotated Edition.

In 2020, he moved to Texas in order "to secure the future of Meaningwave, his son's childhood, and the very Don Dynasty itself." From 2021 to 2026, he resided in Mexico. In 2026, he returned to the US, residing in Nashville, Tennessee.

== Discography ==
=== Albums ===
2006

- When We Were Young

2010

- The Kidnapping Of Akira The Don Akira -The Don, Joey2tits’ - By Joey2tits

2011

- Living In The Future
- The Life Equation

2016

- GOLDTRON

2017

- GOLDTRON II
- THEMES
- BLISS POINT

2018

- 12 Rules For Life: The Album featuring Jordan Peterson
- Timewave featuring Terence McKenna
- GOLDTRON III
- IV: DREAMS featuring Alan Watts
- JBPWAVE: Genesis featuring Jordan Peterson
- STOP THINKING IV (The instrumental version of Wattswave IV: Dreams)
- JBPWAVE: GENESIS Instrumental
- ELON: A Space Odyssey featuring Elon Musk
- THIS IS WATERWAVE featuring David Foster Wallace
- SPACEWAVE: The Elon Instrumental Vol. 1
- GOLDTRON IV
- THE IMMORTAL STAN LEE featuring Stan Lee
- MEANINGWAVE CHRISTMAS

2019

- THE PATH featuring Jocko Willink
- WATTSWAVE V featuring Alan Watts
- CLOCKWORK ELVES featuring Terence McKenna
- JBPWAVE: Paradise featuring Jordan Peterson
- GET AFTER IT: Motivational Instrumentals
- STOP THINKING V: Transcendent Instrumental
- CLEAN UP YOUR ROOM 8
- MEANINGWAVE MASTERPIECES
- GOGGINS featuring David Goggins
- HOW TO GET RICH VOL. 1 featuring Naval Ravikant
- PHONK BEATS: Trappin In The Dungeon (The Goggins Instrumentals)
- PRESENT: Calm (The Naval Instrumentals)
- JBPWAVE: Father featuring Jordan Peterson
- CLEAN UP YOUR ROOM 9

2020

- SONGS OF MYTHOLOGY featuring Joseph Campbell
- MYTHICAL BEATS (The Joseph Campbell Instrumentals)
- MEDITATIONS VOL. 1 featuring Marcus Aurelius
- THE GARY VEE SHOW featuring Gary Vaynerchuk
- STOIC BEATS - The Marcus Aurelius Instrumentals
- WATTSWAVE VI featuring Alan Watts
- STOP THINKING VI
- THE USER INTERFACE FOR REALITY ITSELF featuring Scott Adams
- PERSUASIVE BEATS (A Scott Adams Instrumentals)
- EXPERIENCE featuring Joe Rogan
- GREAT & POWERFUL BEATS: The Rogan Instrumentals
- MEANINGWAVE MASTERPIECES II
- WATTSWAVE II: HOW TO BE A BETTER PERSON featuring Alan Watts
- MEANINGWAVE MASTERPIECES II INSTRUMENTALS
- STOP THINKING II - The Alan Watts Instrumentals

2021

- JBPWAVE: Aesthetic featuring Jordan Peterson
- CLEAN UP YOUR ROOM X - The Jordan Peterson Instrumental
- THE WAR ON CONSCIOUSNESS featuring Graham Hancock
- AYAHUASCA BEATS (The Graham Hancock Instrumental)
- HOW TO GET RICH VOL. 2 featuring Naval Ravikant
- PRESENT II: The Naval Instrumentals
- TELLING STORIES featuring Theo Von
- HITTERS - The Theo Von Instrumentals
- BASKET CASE THEORY featuring Scott Adams
- PERSUASIVE BEATS II (Scott Adams Instrumental)
- FREEDOM TO CHAINS featuring Paul Harvey
- LOFI CHRISTMAS IV
- THE CALL TO ADVENTURE featuring Jordan Peterson

2022

- TRUTH & DRAGONS (Orchestral Versions) featuring Jordan Peterson
- TRUTH & DRAGONS featuring Jordan Peterson
- CLEAN UP YOUR ROOM XI (Truth & Dragons Instrumentals)
- MEANINGWAVE MASTERPIECES III
- MYTHOS featuring Joseph Campbell
- GET SOME featuring Jocko Willink
- GET AFTER IT II
- MASTERPIECE INSTRUMENTALS III
- LOFI CHRISTMAS V
- THE WOLF featuring Alan Watts x Carl Jung

2023

- MEANINGWAVE MASTERPIECES IV
- MASTERPIECE INSTRUMENTALS IV
- HOW TO GET RICH VOL. 3 featuring Naval Ravikant
- PRESENT 3: The Naval Instrumentals
- DUNEWAVE: ODYSSEY featuring DanikaXIX
- SONGS OF ARRAKIS: DUNEWAVE INSTRUMENTALS
- LOFI CHRISTMAS VI

2024

- MYTHOS Joseph Campbell
- BETTER THAN JUSTICE Marcus Aurelius
- BEHIND CLOSED DOORS Marcus Aurelius
- STOP DRIFTING! Marcus Aurelius
- MEDITATIONS VOL. II featuring Marcus Aurelius
- STOIC BEATS II: The Marcus Aurelius Instrumentals
- ESCAPE
- WHAT WE BECOME WE THINK ABOUT Earl Nightingale
- CONFORMITY Earl Nightingale
- I DON’T BELIEVE IN CIRCUMSTANCES Earl Nightingale
- THE STRANGEST SECRET IN THE WORLD featuring Earl Nightingale
- THE STRANGEST SECRET INSTRUMENTALS
- GOGGINS II featuring David Goggins
- PHONK BEATS II - The Goggins Instrumentals
- HANK featuring Charles Bukowski
- BUKOWSKI BEATS
- WARPATH featuring Jocko Willink
- GET AFTER IT III
- LOFI CHRISTMAS VII

2025

- MAYBE (THE CHINESE FARMER) featuring Alan Watts
- WEIRDER AND WEIRDER featuring Terence McKenna
- MEANINGWAVE MASTERPIECES V
- INFINITE featuring Earl Nightingale
- AGE OF THE MIND featuring Earl Nightingale
- THE WRONG PROBLEMS featuring Earl Nightingale
- THE MIRACLE OF YOUR MIND featuring Earl Nightingale
- ASSUME YOU HAVE IT featuring Neville Goddard
- THAT GOLDEN SOUND
- FEELING IS THE SECRET featuring Neville Goddard
- EVERYTHING YOU WANT featuring Neville Goddard
- COMFORT ZONES ARE POISON featuring Michael Chandler
- ASSUME TO BE TRUE featuring Neville Goddard
- STOP TRYING featuring Neville Goddard
- ALL THAT YOU CAN featuring Fulton J. Sheen
- GOD MADE A FARMER feat Paul Harvey
- STOP TRYING (Instrumentals)
- THE ANSWER’S NO feat Naval Ravikant
- PORUS feat Marshall McLuhan
- SOCCER featuring Scott Adams
- HAVING TO BE ALONE featuring David Foster Wallace
- DON’T STOP ASKING QUESTIONS featuring Naval Ravikant
- BE WATER Bruce Lee
- DON’T THINK (FEEL) Bruce Lee
- THE PAYOFF Scott Adams
- ME IS A DISEASE Naval Ravikant
- SILK ROAD BEATS
- ACRES OF DIAMONDS (Aug 8) Earl Nightingale
- ACRES OF DIAMONDS II (IN MY MIND) Earl Nightingale
- WE DO IT Earl Nightingale
- ACRES OF DIAMONDS (Aug 29) Earl Nightingale
- THAT GOLDEN SOUND II
- WHAT IS HAPPINESS Naval Ravikant
- SEARCHING FOR PEACE
- WHAT YOU THINK ABOUT THE MOST Scott Adams
- WHAT YOU ARE LOOKING FOR IS WHAT YOU ARE Rupert Spira
- BEAUTIFUL WORLD Scott Adams
- LOFI CHRISTMAS VIII
- MANIFESTS Charles Carroll of Carrollton
- MAN CAN MOVE HIMSELF (KINGDOM OF HEAVEN)
- MEANINGWAVE MASTERPIECES VI
- PEOPLE ARE ONLY RATIONAL TEN PERCENT OF THE TIME featuring Scott Adams
- I DON’T REGRET ANYTHING featuring Scott Adams
- ALMOST ANYTHING COULD HAPPEN TODAY featuring Scott Adams

=== EPs ===
- GOTHWAVE (Oct 2016)
- Litmas (Dec 2016)
- Harrison Bergeron featuring Kurt Vonnegut (Mar 2018)
- BORN featuring Charles Bukowski (Mar 2018)
- NEW GODS featuring Jack Kirby (Mar 2018)
- WAITSWAVE featuring Tom Waits (Apr 2018)
- Dunewave EP featuring DanikaXIX (Jul 2018)
- >Be Me featuring Internet Historian (Oct 2018)
- Intellectual Dark Wave featuring Eric Weinstein (Oct 2018)
- ANTHEM EP featuring Ayn Rand (Oct 2023)

MIXES/MIXTAPES

- ATD28: Unkillable Thunderchrist
- JBPWAVE 1
- JBPWAVE 2
- HYPERNORMALISATION
- JBPWAVE 3
- LOFI CHRISTMAS
- L A S T C H R I S T M A S
- TRAPPIN AT C H R I S T M A S
- LOFI 2018
- TRUE LOFI ROMANCE
- LUSH LOFI VIBES
- JBPWAVE: A Glitch In The Matrix
- Extreme Ownership
- JBPWAVE 4
- CLEAN UP YOUR ROOM 4
- MOZWAVE (A Morrissey Mix)
- Rainy Lofi Vibes
- LOFI SPRING
- WATTSWAVE
- HSTWAVE
- STOP THINKING
- JBPWAVE 5
- Tay A.I.: The People's Chatbot
- Clean Up Your Room 5
- WATTSWAVE II: Time
- steamed hams but it's lofi hip hop
- STOP THINKING 2
- NAVALWAVE
- Happiness
- JBPWAVE 6
- Clean Up Your Room 6
- WATTSWAVE III
- STOP THINKING III
- Lofi Summer
- The Bare Necessities Lofi Hip Hop Remix
- NeighborWave (A Fred Rogers Mix)
- Midsummer Madness (Akira The Don Just Joji Remix)
- Wholesome Vibes
- Bound 2
- ADVENTURE WAVE
- RUNNING - A Meaningwave Mix
- RUNNING 2 - A Meaningwave Mix
- LOFI CHRISTMAS 2
- LOFI BEATS
- LOFI BEATS 2
- LOFI CHRISTMAS 3
- KEEP CALM AND LISTEN TO MEANINGWAVE
- This Is A Mysterious Planet And We Are Mysterious Beings
- LOFI BEATS IMMORTAL
- A LOFI CHRISTMAS MIRACLE
- THE CHAD FORMULA
- THE CHAD FORMULA 2
- THE NEW PSYCHEDELIC WAVE
- THE CHAD FORMULA 3
- THE SHADOW | A Berserk Meaningwave Mixtape
- THE BEST OF MEANINGWAVE VOL.1
- LOFI BEATS ALPHA
- DECENTRALAND 2
- SONGS ABOUT DISCIPLINE
- COFFEE & MEANINGWAVE
- THE CHAD FORMULA (2022)
- STOICWAVE: Reject Modernity
- COFFEE & MEANINGWAVE 3
- THANK YOU
- DOOMER
- DOOMER TO BLOOMER
- BLOOMER MUSIC
- DOOMER TO BLOOMER: NIRVANA
- THE MEANING OF CHRISTMAS
- THE BEST OF ALAN WATTS VOL. 1
- MEANING PILL VOL. 1: ESCAPE THE MATRIX
- MOTIVATION OVER 9000
- Lofi Spring Has Sprung Mix
- SONGS ABOUT FREEDOM
- THE HERO'S STORY
- HONOUR THY FATHER
- HOPECORE MUSIC VOL. 1
- HOPECORE VOL. 2
- THE BEST OF ALAN WATTS LOFI VOL. 2
- HOPECORE VOL. 3
- LOFI CHRISTMAS: THE KING OF LOFI CHRISTMAS
- STOICWAVE 2: MEMENTO MORI
- NEW LIFE VOL. 1
- STOICWAVE 3: CITY OF MARBLE
- OCEAN VIEW
- I TOSS AND TURN AT NIGHT
- LOFI CHRISTMAS 100
