= The Invisible Line =

Studio album by Temposhark
- Released: 25 March 2008 (USA/Canada)
- Recorded: 2007
- Genre: Electronica, alternative, pop, rock
- Length: 45:45
- Label: Paper and Glue in association with Defend Music (via Ryko in USA)
- Producer: Sean McGhee, Guy Sigsworth

Temposhark chronology
The Invisible Line (2008)	The Invisible Line (2009)	Threads (2010)

The Invisible Line is the debut album by UK band, Temposhark.

== Recording ==
Temposhark's debut album was produced and recorded in London by rising producer Sean McGhee with two tracks produced by Frou Frou member Guy Sigsworth, who contributes It's Better To Have Loved and Winter's Coming. The recording process ran from August 2006 until February 2007. The album will include many brand new songs alongside some tracks from their rare early EPs, but all the album tracks have been re-produced by McGhee and in some cases re-written with never-before-heard additional sections. The album includes a duet with Imogen Heap called Not That Big. Whilst virtuoso violinist Sophie Solomon appears on tracks Blame and Battleships.

It was released in March 2008 on CD and digital download in the USA/Canada and later in the whole of Europe including UK, Germany and France. The digital version of the album, including a bonus track and PDF downloadable artwork, will also be available in the rest of Europe/Japan/Australia and New Zealand, from early March 2008. There are rumours of more releases including singles for Knock Me Out and Blame, which was co-written with legendary producer Youth aka Martin Glover from Killing Joke.

In February 2007, Temposhark uploaded two brand new songs onto their MySpace.com profile from their debut album. The songs were Don't Mess With Me (a brand new song with lush string arrangements) and Joy (a new album version with a middle section previously unheard). On 23 February 2007, Robert Diament of Temposhark mentioned in his blog that a new song called Winter's Coming would feature on the album and it was produced and co-written with Guy Sigsworth. On 15 March 2007, at the South by Southwest 2007 festival, Temposhark announced on stage that their debut album was to be called The Invisible Line. Robert Diament has said that the album title was inspired by controversial British artist Tracey Emin from passages in her books Exploration Of The Soul (1994) and Strangeland (2005):

There was a phrase that had stuck in my head, it's early on when Tracey talks about her birth. She describes the moment she was born, how she was holding onto invisible lines that connect us all to each other, the past, the present etc… and it resonated with me so strongly as that was always the way I've thought about music, as a magical thing that can travel around the world and connect us to each other. The philosopher Spinoza wrote about invisible lines too in his work… there's many layers to it… I like the surreal, dream-like quality to the idea.

The album is released through singer Robert Diament's own record label, Paper and Glue, and licensed in the US to Defend Music via Ryko.

In October 2007, Temposhark's song "Blame" was nominated in the Best International category at the Ontario Independent Music Awards, which took place in Toronto, Canada, on 15 November 2007.

On 27 December 2007, Diament revealed that one of the earliest songs on the album was "Crime", written when the band first started in Brighton, where Busby was studying visual art and music at the time. Diament has spoken about that era of initial experimentation,

Crime was one of the first songs that Luke and I ever wrote, when Luke was studying in Brighton. Listening to the clip just now brought back so many hilarious memories of us running riot around Brighton with our friend Tasha (who went on to become the very wonderful Bat For Lashes). Around the time of writing Crime, Tasha and I performed in a musical Luke had written. We put it on in a tiny Brighton theatre and had such a laugh doing it. Great memories - but I just hope the video footage never turns up!

== Critical reception ==
Professional ratings
Review scores
Source	Rating
Clash Magazine (UK)	3/5 stars
The Guardian (UK)	Positive
NME (UK)	7/10 stars
MusicOMH (UK)	3.5/5 stars
PopMatters	4/10 stars
URB Magazine (US)	5/5 stars

In February 2008, Temposhark and their song Blame was announced as a finalist in the Pop/Top 40 category of the International Songwriting Competition (ISC). Blame was chosen by a board of respected judges included Nelly Furtado, DJ Tiësto, Robert Smith of The Cure and Julian Casablancas of The Strokes. In April 2008, the song went on to win second place in the Pop/Top 40 category.

In the same month, The Invisible Line was highlighted in The Guardian as a new band to watch article, described as "What if Kate Bush had shagged Marc Almond and spawned a monster that grew up listening to Violator? That's Temposhark, musically at any rate."

In March 2008, the NME praised Temposhark's debut album with a positive review, "What if Trent Reznor was raised on the Pet Shop Boys rather than Einsturzende Neubauten? Think these dudes... they could be your new favourite band. 7 out of 10"

Temposhark's animated music video to their single Blame was selected for the Edinburgh International Film Festival 2008. Directed by New York-based artist Motomichi Nakamura, the video will be screened on 22 June as part of the Mirrorball event focused on music video and music documentaries.

On 27 June 2008, SXSW Click digital festival announced Temposhark's music video Blame in the top 3 finalists for the best music video of 2008. At the end of July 2008, Temposhark were announced the winner of the Music Video category, and will therefore have their video screened at the prestigious 2009 SXSW Film Festival in Austin, Texas.

Temposhark's music video to Blame has also been shortlisted for the Portugal International Music Video Festival ViMUS 2008 and will be screened in Póvoa de Varzim, Portugal between 4–7 September 2008.

The Blame video went on to be nominated for a Hollywood Music Award (ceremony in November 2008) whilst also being selected for screening at the San Francisco International Animation Festival (run by the San Francisco Film Society) and at the Holland Animation Film Festival 2008.

On 7 September 2008, Temposhark's song Knock Me Out was played on the MTV Video Music Awards 2008.

In 2010, Temposhark's Knock Me Out gained popularity with gamers thanks to the song being featured on the US computer game website OurWorld in level 6 of the game Dance Planet and Dance Planet Multiplayer.

== Track listing ==
1. "Don't Mess With Me" – 3:23
2. "Joy" – 3:20
3. "Blame" – 4:04
4. "It's Better To Have Loved" – 3:37
5. "Not That Big" – 3:52
6. "Knock Me Out" – 3:39
7. "Crime" – 4:13
8. "Battleships" – 3:56
9. "Little White Lie" – 3:50
10. "Invisible Ink (prelude)" – 0:39
11. "Invisible Ink" – 4:27
12. "Winter's Coming" – 3:54
13. "Invisible Ink (reprise)" - 2:24 (hidden track)
14. "Neon Question Mark" – 3:07 (bonus track, digital download only)
15. "Snow" – 2:57 (bonus track, digital download only)
