= Jeff Melnyk =

Canadian electronic music producer

Melnyk
- Origin: Alberta, Canada & London, England
- Genres: Electronica, Electropop, Pop
- Years active: 2004–present
- Label: Gaymonkey
- Website: gaymonkeyrecords.com

Melnyk is a Canadian electronic music producer who lives and works in London, England.

== Career ==
Jeff Melnyk co-runs the independent record label Gaymonkey Records. His debut album Silence received worldwide critical acclaim, and fans such as the Pet Shop Boys approached Melnyk as a result to remix their hit single I'm With Stupid.

Melnyk has also collaborated extensively with UK pop band Temposhark. Melnyk has remixed a number of songs for Temposhark including their cult hit Joy. In June 2007, Melnyk released a remix album called Silence Remixed, which featured a Temposhark remix of Melnyk's song Me and My Muse featuring the additional vocals of lead singer Robert Diament. In 2008, Temposhark's singer appeared on Melnyk's second album Revolutions on a track called Hurricane, which was inspired by the Temposhark song Knock Me Out.

Melnyk has also produced four tracks for Louie Austen's 2006 album Iguana.

== Discography ==
=== Albums ===
- Silence (2005)
- Revolutions (2008)

=== Remix albums ===
- Silence Remixed (2007)

=== Singles and EPs ===
- "Art of Seduction" (2004)
- "Strut" (2005)
- "Fabulous" (2005)
- "Silence Remixed Vol. One" (2006)
- "Sound of Falling" (2006)
- "Revolutions" (2008)
- "The Competition" (2009)

=== Remixes ===
- Sara Berg - "Nuclear Love" (2004)
- Sara Berg - "Fabulous" (2004)
- Sara Berg - "Another Night" (2005)
- Napsugar - "Blind" (2006)
- My Robot Friend - "America is Automatic" (2006)
- Pet Shop Boys - "I'm With Stupid" (2006)
- Ebb - "I'm All Made of Music" (2006)
- Temposhark - "Joy" (2006)
- Louie Austen - "Disco Dancer" (2006)
- Division Kent - "In the Headlights" (2009)
- Temposhark - "Bye Bye Baby" (2009)
- MaJiKer - "Wall of Sound" (2010)
