= Earl Nightingale =

American radio speaker and author

Earl Nightingale V
- Born: March 12, 1921; Los Angeles, California, U.S.
- Died: March 25, 1989 (aged 68); Scottsdale, Arizona, U.S.
- Occupations: Radio speaker, author
- Notable work: Sky King, The Strangest Secret, Our Changing World

Earl Nightingale V (March 12, 1921 – March 25, 1989) was an American radio speaker and author, dealing mostly with the subjects of human character development, motivation, and meaningful existence. He was the voice during the early 1950s of Sky King, the hero of a radio adventure series, and was a WGN radio program host from 1950 to 1956. Nightingale was the author of The Strangest Secret, which economist Terry Savage has termed "…one of the great motivational books of all time." During his lifetime, Nightingale wrote and recorded more than 7,000 radio programs, 250 audio programs as well as television programs and videos.

== Early life, family and education ==
Nightingale was born in Los Angeles, California, in March 1921. His father, Earl Nightingale IV, abandoned his mother in 1933. After his father left, his mother relocated the family to a tent in nearby Tent City in Long Beach on the waterfront behind the Mariner Apartments.

== Military career ==
When Nightingale was seventeen years old he joined the United States Marine Corps. He was an instructor at Camp Lejeune, North Carolina. Nightingale was on the USS Arizona during the attack on Pearl Harbor and was one of fifteen surviving Marines aboard that day. Other than Pearl Harbor, it is unknown if Nightingale experienced combat. He left the military in 1946.

== Career ==
After World War II, Nightingale began work in the radio industry, which eventually resulted in work as a motivational speaker and narrator. During the autumn of 1949, Nightingale was inspired while reading Think and Grow Rich by Napoleon Hill.

During 1956, he produced a spoken word record, The Strangest Secret, which sold more than a million copies, making it the first spoken-word recording to achieve Gold Record status.

In 1959, Nightingale-Conant produced a radio program, called Our Changing World. It aired on more than a thousand radio stations, and became, at the time, the longest-running and most widely syndicated show in radio history. It was broadcast across the US, Canada, Mexico, Australia, New Zealand, Fiji, South Africa, the Bahamas, and 23 additional overseas countries, as well as the Armed Forces Network. Earl Nightingale eventually recorded 7,000 radio programs and was elected into the Radio Hall of Fame.

During 1960, Nightingale narrated a condensed audio version of Think and Grow Rich, titled Think and Grow Rich: The Essence Of The Immortal Book By Napoleon Hill, Narrated by Earl Nightingale and produced by Success Motivation Institute. Also in 1960, he co-founded the Nightingale-Conant Corporation with Lloyd Conant.

In the early-1960s, Nightingale-Conant released its first audiobook, Lead The Field. The book was released on a collection of cassette tapes, and featured Earl Nightengale talking about the secrets of success. The book was highly successful. "Lead the Field" created an entire new industry of audio recorded motivational books. In 1978, Nightingale-Conant added Denis Waitley as its second author. His recording The Psychology of Winning sold 1.5 million copies, making it the bestselling audio self-improvement program in history. Because of the success of Waitley’s program, the Company began to publish a variety of authors. Earl Nightengale updated the Lead The Field series in 1987, with a newly-recorded version of the tape set, released under the same name.

Nightingale published his first book, Earl Nightingale’s Greatest Discovery, in 1987.

After his retirement, Nightingale and his wife Diana formed the company Keys Publishing. Just prior to his death in 1989, Nightingale created a new format for a book, The Winner’s Notebook. It included his texts, his illustrations, and incorporated space for a private journal.

== Recognition ==
Nightingale's LP record album The Strangest Secret went gold.

In 1976, he won the Golden Gavel Award from Toastmasters International. He was inducted into the National Speakers Association Speaker Hall of Fame. In 1985, he was inducted into The National Association of Broadcasters National Radio Hall of Fame.

During the mid-1980s, Nightingale received the Napoleon Hill Gold Medal for Literary Excellency for his first book, Earl Nightingale’s Greatest Discovery.

== Personal life ==
Earl Nightingale's wife Diana Nightingale continued working with Earl's commercial themes.

Nightingale died on March 25, 1989, in Scottsdale, Arizona, of complications after heart surgery.

== See also ==
- New Thought – 19th-century American spiritual movement
