= Cursor Miner =

English electronica producer

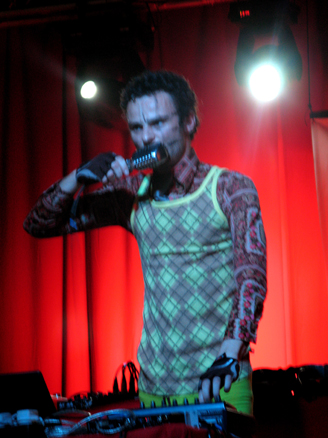
Cursor Miner at Sónar 2007

Cursor Miner (Robert Tubb) is an underground electronica producer from Selsey, England. Signed to Lo Recordings and Uncharted Audio in the UK, he has released four albums, Cursor Miner Requires Attention (2010), Danceflaw (2006), Cursor Miner Plays God (2004) and Explosive Piece Of Mind (2002). His music was described by Uncut as "electro Syd Barrett meets Aphex Twin meets Gary Numan with a touch of early Eno and a nod at Beck". He is also a popular remixer, and in 2005 had an underground hit with Temposhark's 'Little White Lie'.
