= Envy (English rapper) =

- Born: Nicola Varley; 9 April 1987 (age 39)
- Origin: Sale, Greater Manchester, England
- Genres: Grime, electro, hip hop
- Occupation: Rapper
- Instrument: Vocals
- Years active: 2006–present
- Label: StopStart Records

Nicola Varley (born 9 April 1987), known as Envy, is an English rapper/MC.

Envy carved out her own niche in the predominantly male British grime scene with several appearances on 'The City Is Ours Music Mixtapes' from Manchester. This led to collaborations with artists from all over the UK She released her debut solo single, "Tongue Twister", through StopStart Records.

Having graduated from Loughborough University with a degree in Media, Envy now concentrates on her music career full-time:

Her lyrics, if you can hear them (you might need a vari-speed facility), are well smart, with the wry, pithy intelligence of the media-savvy: "I take it tit for tat/I'll take your tacit consent/To turn the Taliban to take over your town… You're lookin' to be loved but can't find a flippin' solution/I'm lost on location, laceratin' as I'm lacin'/Lookin' lovely/Better pray your label pay for elocution," she rapid-fires over the bubblicious grime rhythms, with their shades of Missy's Work It, of previous single Tongue Twister. We're not sure what she means or who the subject is of her ire here, but as ever she sounds fierce yet witty, her staccato delivery popping in time to the buzzing, fizzing synth beat. In fact, so rhythmic is her phrasing that it would sound good acappella, but it works both ways: remove her rhymes and you've got pristine future-perfect electro-pop.

== Discography ==
=== Albums ===
| Year | Title |
|---|---|
| 2010 | Set Yourself on Fire: Released: 22 March 2010; Formats: CD, digital download; Label: StopStart Records |

=== Singles ===
| Title | Release date |
|---|---|
| "Tongue Twister" | 5 May 2008 |
| "Friday Night" | 24 November 2008 |
