= TDK Cross Central =

TDK Cross Central was a dance music festival run by TDK Corporation and held in Kings Cross, London, England from 2004 to 2007. It included performances from the likes of Goldfrapp and Grace Jones.
