= Simon Hobart =

British businessman (1964–2005)

Simon Hobart (24 September 1964 – 23 October 2005) was a figure in British gay nightlife. He founded the alternative nightclub Popstarz at London's Scala. He was also the owner and promoter of Soho venues Ghetto (which hosted the Nag Nag Nag night) and Trash Palace.

== Early career ==
He began his career as a promoter and DJ at a Westbourne Grove goth club in the early 1980s, the KitKat. In 1984, a photo of him in full goth regalia was splashed across the front page of the tabloid The Sun, above the caption "Godfather of Goth." Hobart took the fall for the first club raid on London's first all-night club. Police (dressed as goths) undertook surveillance of the venue and saw no club managers or owners at the place: just the 20-year-old DJ. 200 police descended upon the premises. Hobart was sentenced to undertake community service.

Following the huge success of the night, he opened Bedrock. He has said in interviews that he promoted the club's opening night (3 February 1989 At Oxfords, 21 Oxford street W1) by not letting anyone in, forcing them in a long queue outside, but blasting the music and pretending it was packed to capacity inside.

Later he had DJ residencies at Heaven. Simon then moved into Drum and Bass, opening two underground DnB nights, Fusion and Vivid.

== Popstarz and later career ==
On 25 May 1995, he started his first gay night, Popstarz, capitalizing on the popularity of Britpop. "If Popstarz had failed," he told Alternative London Magazine, "I wouldn’t have embarrassed myself, because I didn’t know anyone in the gay community."

He told Gay.com that he started Popstarz to bring something different to the gay scene, away from the “factory-farm stereotyped, mindless, blinkered gay people” churned out by other clubs. "The feeling was that gay people had been liberated from the hell that they’d been in for most of their teen to adult lives,” he said. “So many people said to me it was like coming out of the closet for the second time.”

In more recent years, his passion was the Ghetto (previously the Tube Nightclub), a small basement club behind the London Astoria, where he had the opportunity to nurture a number of criss-crossing alternative gay scenes.

Simon often said he was willing to take losses on certain nights (such as Redeye) because he was so committed to promoting the alternative gay scene.

In 2003, The Observer included Simon in its list of the 20 most influential gay people in the country.

== Death ==
Simon Hobart died in the early hours of Sunday 23 October 2005 outside his home in Clapham, London. An inquest into his death recorded that 'the toxic effect of alcohol had affected his breathing'

A benefit night was held in Hobart's honour with close friend, Suede front man Brett Anderson as the DJ that night.
