= Ilo Veyou =

Studio album by Camille
- Released: October 7, 2011
- Genre: Chanson
- Length: 39:25
- Label: EMI Music France
- Producer: Camille

Camille chronology
Music Hole (2008)	Ilo Veyou (2011)	Oui (2017)

Ilo Veyou is the fourth studio album by French singer Camille, released on October 7, 2011.

AllMusic stated in its review of the album, "with such an ambitiously unconventional approach, it's quite an achievement that Ilo Veyou contains far more hits than misses."

Ilo Veyou has sold 50,000 copies in France.

== Track listing ==
1. "Aujourd'hui"
2. "L'étourderie"
3. "Allez allez allez"
4. "Wet Boy"
5. "She Was"
6. "Mars Is No Fun"
7. "Le Berger"
8. "Bubble Lady"
9. "Ilo Veyou"
10. "Message"
11. "La France"
12. "My Man Is Married But Not to Me"
13. "Pleasure"
14. "Le Banquet"
15. "Tout Dit"

== Musicians ==
- Clément Ducol: Guitar, prepared piano, arrangements
- Christelle Lassort, Guillaume Roger, Jean-Marie Baudour: Violin
- Martin Rodriguez: Viola
- Anaïs Belorgey: Cello
- Maxime Duhem: Tuba
- Marianne Tilquin: Horn
- Alexander Angelov, Martin Gamet: Double bass
