= Nag Nag Nag =

Coordinates: 51.5161°N 0.1307°W

Promotional flyer

Nag Nag Nag was an influential London club night at Simon Hobart's Ghetto nightclub. Founded by DJ, promoter and musician Jonny Slut in 2002, it ran for six years. The night is commonly associated with the post-electroclash scene.

== History ==
The Independent described the night as a "legendary electro midweeker" famous for its blend of subcultures and musical styles. It was held every Wednesday night from 2002 to 2008. In 2003, The Independent wrote that "it's the sort of place where students mix with celebs, where you wait your turn behind Kate Moss for the make-up mirror, and where the presence of Boy George, checking out Pink Grease last week, didn't even merit a double take."

Popular among London's celebrities, stars such as Kate Moss, Alexander McQueen, Björk, Keith Flint, Gwen Stefani, Cilla Black, Zoë Ball and regular Boy George were documented partying there, and acts such as Ellen Allien, Vitalic, Miss Kittin and My Toys Like Me performed.

Jonny Slut told The Times in 2005 that "one reason I started the night was that music was becoming more interesting again. It might not entertain 4,000 people at Ministry of Sound, but it certainly entertains my crowd. Anyone who thinks club culture is dead should come and see my queue on Wednesday nights."

The club's name is derived from the song "Nag Nag Nag" by 1970s industrial band Cabaret Voltaire. The track is included on a double CD compilation of music that was played at the club, compiled by Jonny Slut, released in 2003.

Nag Nag Nag closed in May 2008.

== NagNagNag Records and Atomizer ==
Jonny Slut and another of the club's DJs, Fil OK, released music on their own label called NagNagNag under the name Atomizer. Their debut single was co-produced by the KLF's Jimmy Cauty.

=== Discography ===
==== Singles, EPs ====
- Hooked On Radiation (International Deejay Gigolo Records, 2003)
- Snake / Ball & Chain (Nagnagnag, 2005)
- Zero Zero (Nagnagnag, 2006)
- Underdog EP (BearCage, 2006)
- I'd Prefer Not To / Rot of the Stars (Nagnagnag, 2007)
- Je Suis Lesbien EP (Nagnagnag, 2007)
- Karate Marble Factory EP (Nagnagnag, 2008)
- So Many Poisons EP (Nagnagnag, 2010)

==== Albums ====
- Rubber Youth (Nagnagnag, 2006)
- Cult of Europa (Nagnagnag, 2009)
- Open Secret (Nagnagnag, 2011)
