= Arts in Póvoa de Varzim =

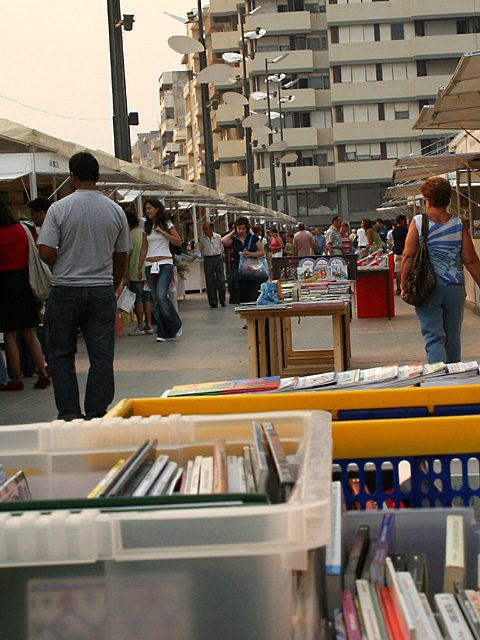
The Póvoa de Varzim Book Fair takes place in August.

Several places and events are associated with the Arts in Póvoa de Varzim, Portugal.

Diana Bar, Póvoa de Varzim, currently the beach library, was a traditional writers meeting place since the 19th century, and was where José Régio passed his free time writing. Other famous writers closely associated with the city are Almeida Garrett, Camilo Castelo Branco, António Nobre, and Agustina Bessa-Luís. Nevertheless, the city is often remembered as the birthplace of Eça de Queiroz, one of the main writers in the Portuguese language.

In modern times, the city gained international prominence with Correntes d'Escritas, a literary festival where writers from the Portuguese and Spanish-speaking world gather in a variety of presentations and an annual award for best new release. Other international meetings include the music video festival presentation known as VIMUS and the International Music Festival, an erudite event established in 1978.

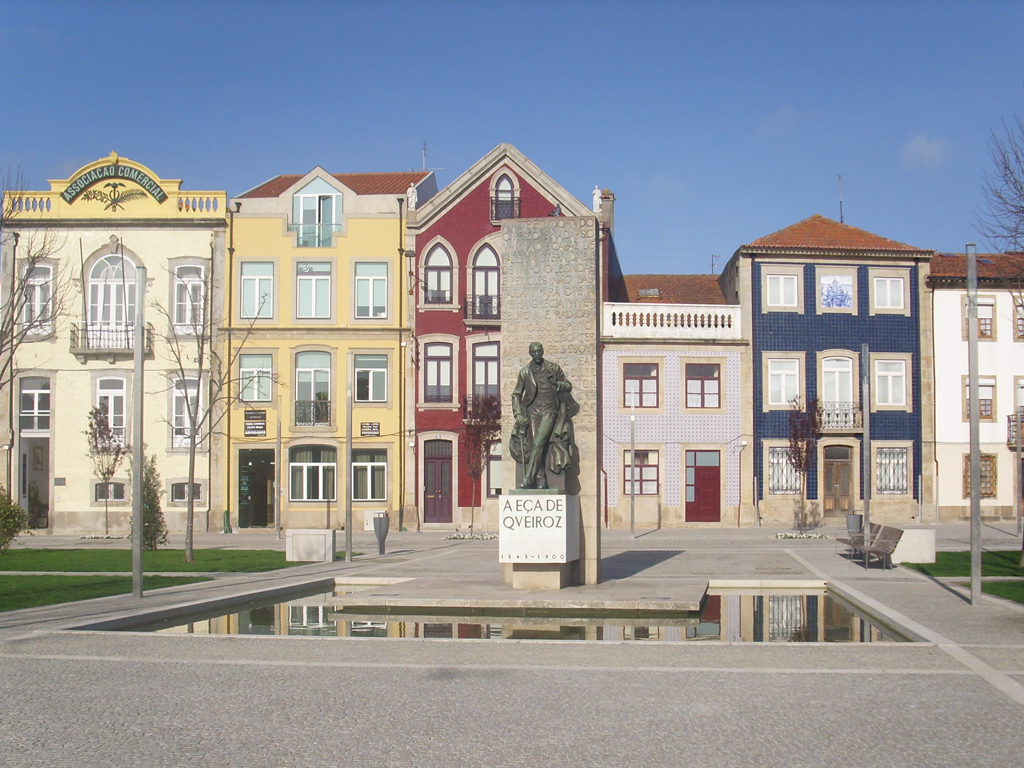
Statue of Eça de Queiroz in Praça do Almada."I'm a poor man from Póvoa de Varzim" is one of Eça's most famous autobiographical phrases.

The Cine-Teatro Garrett Theatre was, for more than a century, the most important performing arts venue in the city, but it closed and was bought by the city council that plans to reopen it in the future. The municipal auditory had been created in early 21st century and is where the School of Music and the Octopus Film club with exhibitions of quality cinema coexist. The Varazim Teatro is a cultural and youth group of amateur theatre that has encouraged local drama and the Filantrópica, created in 1935, has as its purpose the execution of cultural activities and inducement to artistic creation.

The Ethnography and History Municipal Museum of Póvoa de Varzim was established in 1937 by António dos Santos Graça in order to preserve the Poveiro’s practices and traditions which were being lost without record or research in it. Two themed museums exist: the Museum Nucleus of the Romanesque Church of Saint Peter of Rates which is dedicated to the dissemination of the history, legend and art surrounding the Romanesque Church of Saint Peter of Rates, and the Archaeological Nucleus of Cividade de Terroso, which serves as a presentation of Cividade de Terroso. The Arquivo Municipal is the city's archive planned for those who are interested in tracing their own family pedigree chart or scrutinize the city's records.

== See also ==
- Festivals of Póvoa de Varzim
