= Camille (French singer) =

French singer (born 1978)

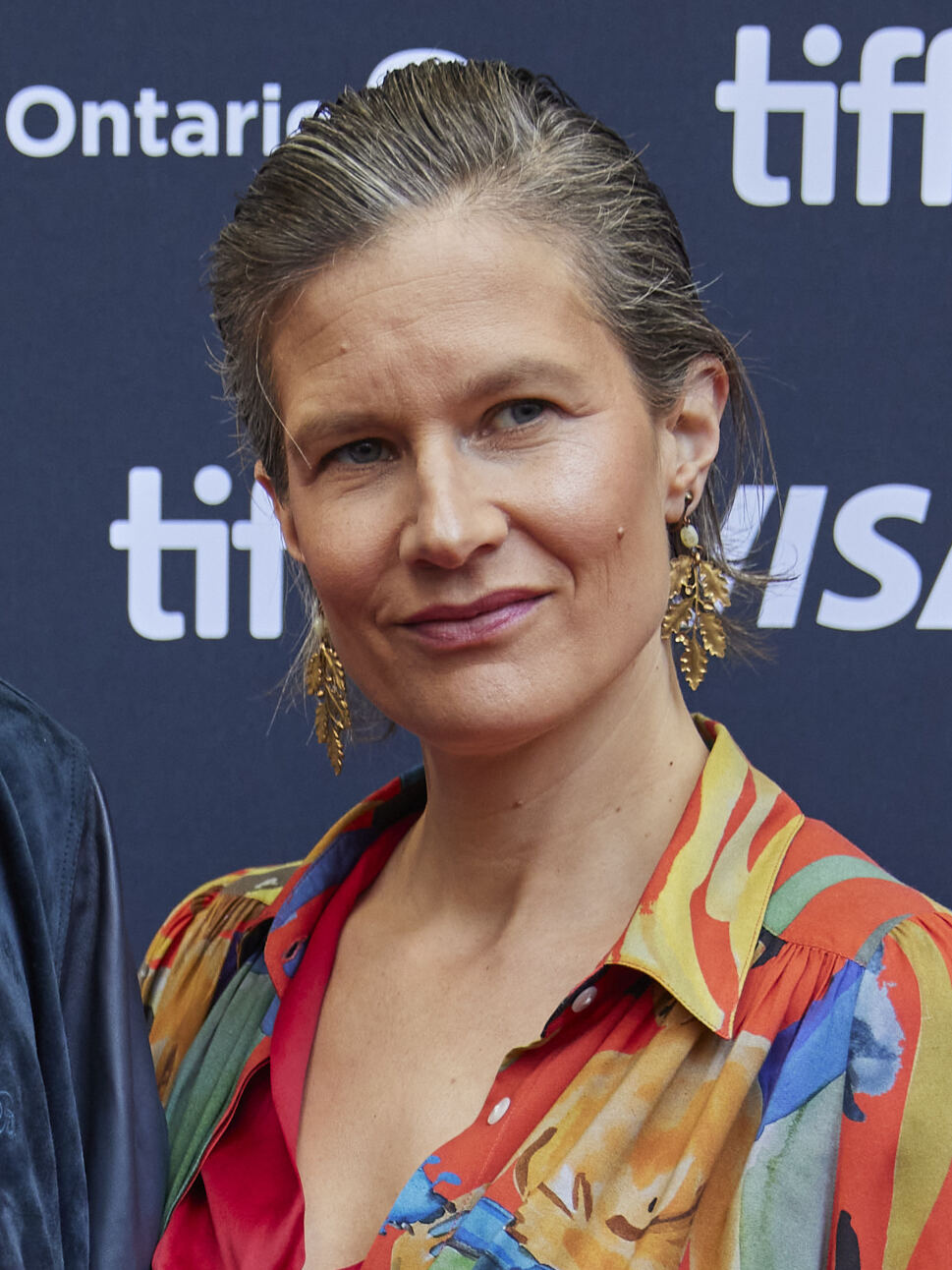
- Camille in 2024

Background information
- Born: Camille Dalmais; 10 March 1978 (age 48); Paris, France
- Genre: Chanson
- Occupation: Singer
- Years active: 2002–present
- Labels: Virgin; Because
- Website: camilleofficiel.fr

Camille Dalmais (born 10 March 1978), better known by her mononym Camille, is a French singer-songwriter.

== Early life and education ==
Camille was born and raised in Paris. Her mother was an English teacher and her father, Hervé Dalmais, was a musician. As a teenager, she studied ballet and developed an interest in bossa nova music and American stage musicals. She attended the prestigious Lycée International de Saint Germain-en-Laye, where she obtained her baccalaureate in literature. Thanks to her mother, Camille speaks English fluently as well as her native French. She performed her first original song "Un Homme Déserté" at the age of sixteen while attending a wedding. In the early 2000s, while performing at jazz clubs in Paris, Camille made her acting debut in the film Les Morsures de l'aube (by Antoine de Caunes; with Asia Argento and Guillaume Canet). She also contributed to the song "La Vie la Nuit" in its soundtrack.

She attended Sciences Po Paris just before beginning her music career.

== Career ==
In early 2002, Camille signed a recording contract with Virgin Records. She released her first studio album Le Sac des Filles. In 2004, she began working with Marc Collin and his band Nouvelle Vague, which incorporates new wave and bossa nova music. She contributed vocals to the songs "Too Drunk to Fuck", "In a Manner of Speaking", "The Guns of Brixton", and "Making Plans for Nigel" on their first album.

In 2005, she released the album Le Fil, which was produced in collaboration with English producer MaJiKer. This album incorporated an avant-garde concept – a string, or thread ("le fil"), which was a drone that persisted throughout the entire course of the album. All of the songs on this album are based on the exploration of the voice, with only a double bass, bass guitar, guitar, trombone, percussion, or keyboard as accompanying instruments. Le Fil quickly became certified gold. The song "Ta Douleur" was voted 26th in Australia's Triple J Hottest 100, 2006.

In June 2007, Camille performed Benjamin Britten's A Ceremony of Carols and a new a cappella work God is sound (The 12 World Prayers) at L'église Saint-Eustache, Paris.

Camille's song "1, 2, 3" from Le Sac des Filles was used in the television ad for Cacharel's Promesse perfume starring Laetitia Casta and Matthew Avedon. Her song "Waves" was used in Perrier's "Melting" television ad.

Also in 2007, she contributed to the soundtrack of Pixar's Ratatouille, with the song entitled "Le Festin". Additionally, she provides the European French dub voice of Colette in Ratatouille.

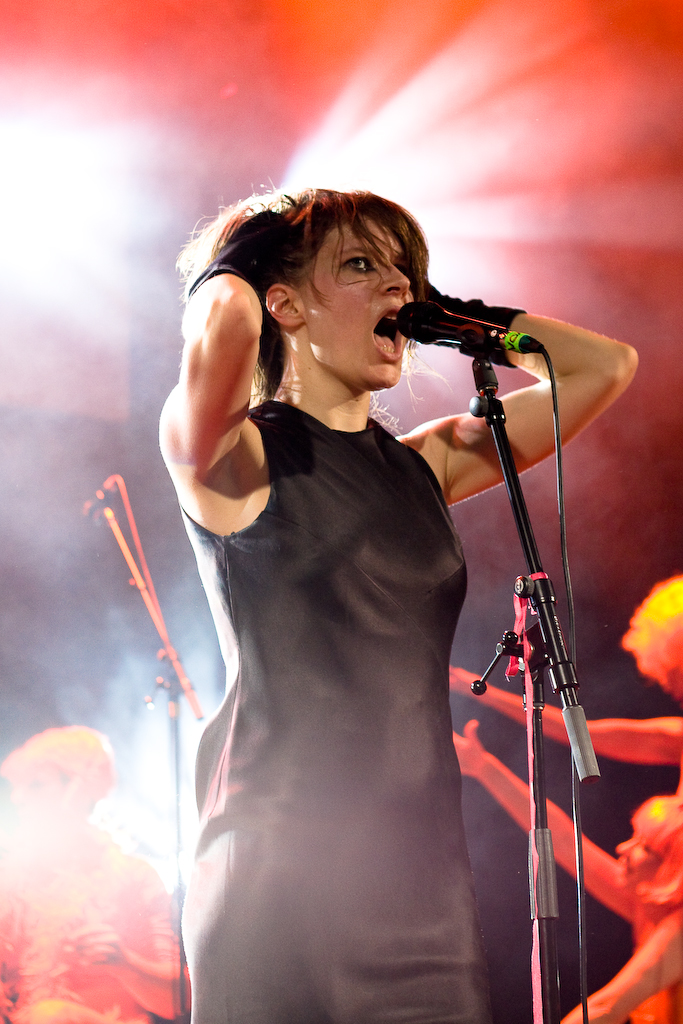
Camille performing in 2009

Camille's album Music Hole was released on 7 April 2008, again produced in collaboration with MaJiKer. Music Hole was recorded and mixed by Valgeir Sigurðsson. The first single from the album, "Gospel with No Lord", was released for online download on 11 February 2008, along with another new song from the album entitled "Money Note".

Her song, "Ta douleur" was featured on the American television program Saturday Night Live. The original sketch aired in October 2010 titled "Les jeunes de Paris" hosted by actress Emma Stone.

She contributed to the track "Putain putain" on Nouvelle Vague's 2010 album Couleurs sur Paris for whom she had previously done work for on their first album. She later appeared on Jérôme Van Den Hole's self-titled album on the track, "Debout".

Her song "Pour que l'amour me quitte", from her 2005 album Le Fil, was covered in Italian superstar Elisa's 2010 acoustic album Ivy in collaboration with her colleague Giorgia.

She is featured in the soundtrack with Hans Zimmer and Richard Harvey to the 2015 French animated film The Little Prince.

Her song "She was" was a theme in the 2022 movie Corsage about the Empress Elisabeth of Austria.

Camille, alongside her partner and longtime musical collaborator Clément Ducol, wrote all of the original songs for Jacques Audiard's Spanish-language musical crime film Emilia Pérez (2024), which premiered at the Cannes Film Festival. Camille wrote all of the lyrics in Spanish with the assistance of a Mexican translator, and performed the songs for the demo. She also composed the film's original score with Ducol. Camille and Ducol went on to win the Cannes Soundtrack Award. The song "El Mal" granted her, Ducol and co-writer Jacques Audiard the Golden Globe Award for Best Original Song, and also won the Oscar.

== Personal life ==
She has two children with musician and percussionist Clément Ducol; Marius, born 18 November 2010, and Lila, born in August 2013.

== Discography ==
=== Studio albums ===
Title	Album details	Peak chart positions					Certification
Title	Album details	FRA	AUS	BEL (Fl)	BEL (Wa)	SWI	Certification
Le Sac des Filles	Released: 23 September 2002; Label: Virgin/EMI	90	—	—	—	—	
Le Fil	Released: 14 February 2005; Label: Virgin	4	27	—	22	48	FRA: 2× Platinum
Music Hole	Released: 7 April 2008; Label: Virgin	5	—	—	7	25	FRA: Platinum
Ilo Veyou	Released: 3 October 2011; Label: Virgin/EMI	3	—	66	9	24	
Ouï	Released: June 2017; Label: Because Music	1	—	186	3	20	

=== Guest appearances ===
Year	Song	Featuring	Album
2004	"In a Manner of Speaking" "Guns of Brixton" "Too Drunk to Fuck" "Making Plans for Nigel"	-	Nouvelle Vague
2005	"Dumb VF"	-	Le Pop En Duo
2005	"Someone Like You"	-	Fast Track (Vocal Mix)
2005	"Si j'avais su"	-	Hold-up
2007	"Le Festin"	-	Ratatouille (soundtrack)
2009	"Alliance"	-	Around Robert Wyatt
2009	"The Pink Piano"	-	Body-Piano-Machine
2009	"Metropolitain"	-	Metropolitain
2010	"Pretty Face"	-	Here Lies Love
2010	"Putain, Putain"	-	Couleurs sur Paris
2011	"Nicole"	Les Petroleuses	The Singers
2011	"Debout"	-	Jérôme Van Den Hole
2013	"L'amie d'un italien (Rainbows)"	Raphael Gualazzi	Happy Mistake
2015	"Suis moi"	Hans Zimmer	Le Petit Prince (soundtrack)
2015	"Equation"	Hans Zimmer	Le Petit Prince (soundtrack)

== Filmography ==
=== Film ===
Year	Title	Role	Notes
2001	Love Bites		Singer
2007	Ratatouille	Colette (voice, European French dub)	Singer
2013	On My Way	Muriel	
2014	Fever	Alice Snow	
2015	The Little Prince		Singer
2019	Heartbeast	Audrey	
2022	Corsage		Composer
2024	Emilia Pérez		Composer

=== Television ===
Year	Title	Role	Notes
2009	Bulles de Vian		TV movie
2014	Capitaine Marleau	Caroline Celac	Episode: "Une voix dans la nuit"

== Awards ==
Award	Year	Nominee(s)	Category	Result	Ref.
BBC Radio 3 Awards for World Music	2007	Herself	Europe Artist of the Year	Won	
Globe de Cristal Awards	2006	Herself	Best Female Singer	Won	
Prix Constantin	2005	Le Fil	Album of the Year	Won	
Victoires de la musique	2006	Herself	Group or Artist Popular Révélation of the Year	Nominated	
Victoires de la musique	2006	Herself	Group or Artist Stage Révélation of the Year	Won	
Victoires de la musique	2006	Le Fil	Album Révélation of the Year	Won	
Victoires de la musique	2006	"Ta douleur"	Original Song of the Year	Nominated	
Victoires de la musique	2009	Herself	Female Group or Artist of the Year	Won	
Victoires de la musique	2009	Music Hole	Song/Variety Album of the Year	Nominated	
Victoires de la musique	2009	Music Hole Tour	Musical Show, Tour or Concert of the Year	Nominated	
Victoires de la musique	2012	Herself	Female Artist of the Year	Nominated	
Victoires de la musique	2012	Ilo Veyou	Song/Variety Album of the Year	Nominated	
Victoires de la musique	2012	"L'Étourderie"	Original Song of the Year	Nominated	
Victoires de la musique	2013	"Allez allez allez"	Original Song of the Year	Won	
Victoires de la musique	2013	Ilo Veyou à l'Olympia	Musical Show, Tour or Concert of the Year	Nominated	
Victoires de la musique	2018	Tournée	Musical Show, Tour or Concert of the Year	Won	
Cannes Film Festival	2024	Emilia Pérez	Soundtrack Award	Won	
Academy Awards	2025	Emilia Pérez	Best Original Score	Nominated	
Academy Awards	2025	"El Mal"	Best Original Song	Won	
Academy Awards	2025	"Mi Camino"	Best Original Song	Nominated	
Golden Globe Awards	2025	Emilia Pérez	Best Original Score	Nominated	
Golden Globe Awards	2025	"El Mal"	Best Original Song	Won	
Golden Globe Awards	2025	"Mi Camino"	Best Original Song	Nominated	
Critics' Choice Movie Awards	2025	Emilia Pérez	Best Score	Nominated	
Critics' Choice Movie Awards	2025	"El Mal"	Best Song	Won	
Critics' Choice Movie Awards	2025	"Mi Camino"	Best Song	Nominated	
British Academy Film Awards	2025	Emilia Pérez	Best Original Music	Nominated	
César Awards	2025	Emilia Pérez	Best Original Music	Won	
Lumière Awards	2025	Emilia Pérez	Best Music	Won	
