= Imogen Heap =

British musician (born 1977)

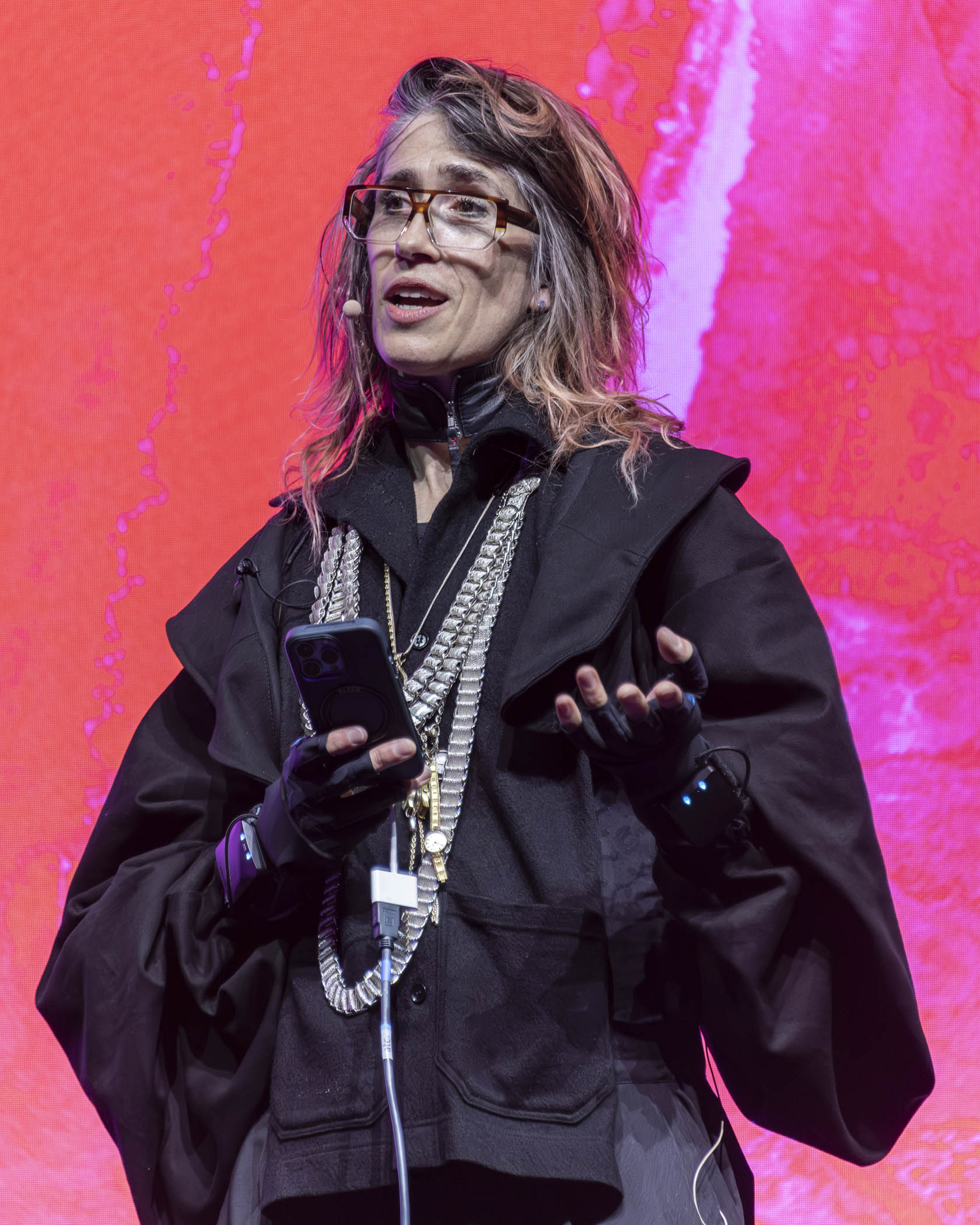
- Heap at SXSW London 2025
- Born: Imogen Jennifer Jane Heap; 9 December 1977 (age 48); Romford, London, England
- Other name: Him Gone Ape
- Education: BRIT School
- Occupations: Musician; singer; songwriter; record producer; entrepreneur
- Years active: 1995–present
- Children: 1
- Relatives: James Paterson (great-grandfather)
- Musical career
- Genres: Pop; electropop; art pop; alternative rock
- Instruments: Vocals; piano; keyboards; keytar; Mi.Mu gloves
- Works: Discography
- Labels: Almo; Megaphonic; RCA; Sony; White Rabbit; Epic
- Member of: Frou Frou
- Website: imogenheap.com

Imogen Jennifer Jane Heap (born 9 December 1977) is an English musician, singer, songwriter, record producer, and entrepreneur. She is considered a pioneer in pop music, particularly electropop, and in music technology.

While attending the BRIT School, Heap signed to independent record label Almo Sounds and later released her debut album I Megaphone (1998). It sold poorly and she was soon left without a record deal. In 2000, she and English record producer Guy Sigsworth formed the electronic duo Frou Frou, in which she was the vocalist, and released their only album to date, Details (2002). Their song "Let Go" earned them wider recognition after being used in Zach Braff's 2004 film Garden State.

Heap produced, recorded, arranged, mixed, and designed the cover art for Speak for Yourself (2005), her second studio album, on her own. It was self-released through her independent record label, Megaphonic Records. Its lead single "Hide and Seek" garnered success internationally after being featured in the Fox television series The O.C. Her follow-up 2005 single "Headlock" went viral on TikTok in 2024 and, in 2025, became both her first entry on the Billboard Hot 100 and her highest entry on the UK Singles Chart. Heap's third studio album, Ellipse (2009), peaked in the top-five of the Billboard 200 chart, produced the single "First Train Home", and made Heap the second woman after Trina Shoemaker to win the Grammy Award for Best Engineered Album, Non-Classical. This was followed by her fourth studio album, Sparks (2014), which topped Billboard's Dance/Electronic Albums chart. Heap also found commercial success with her 2016 children's song "The Happy Song" and collaborated with Clams Casino on the re-release of his 2011 cloud rap song "I'm God" in 2020.

Heap is known for her innovative musical approach, contributions to film and television soundtracks, independent success online, and devoted fanbase. She developed the Mi.Mu gloves, a line of wired musical gloves, and, in the 2020s, became known for her work with and advocacy for artificial intelligence in music. She composed the music for the play Harry Potter and the Cursed Child, a sequel to the Harry Potter novels which premiered on the West End in 2016 and for which she won a Drama Desk Award. She has also been awarded the Grammy Award for Album of the Year for her production work on Taylor Swift's 2014 album 1989, an Ivor Novello Award, and an honorary doctorate from Berklee College of Music.

== Early life ==
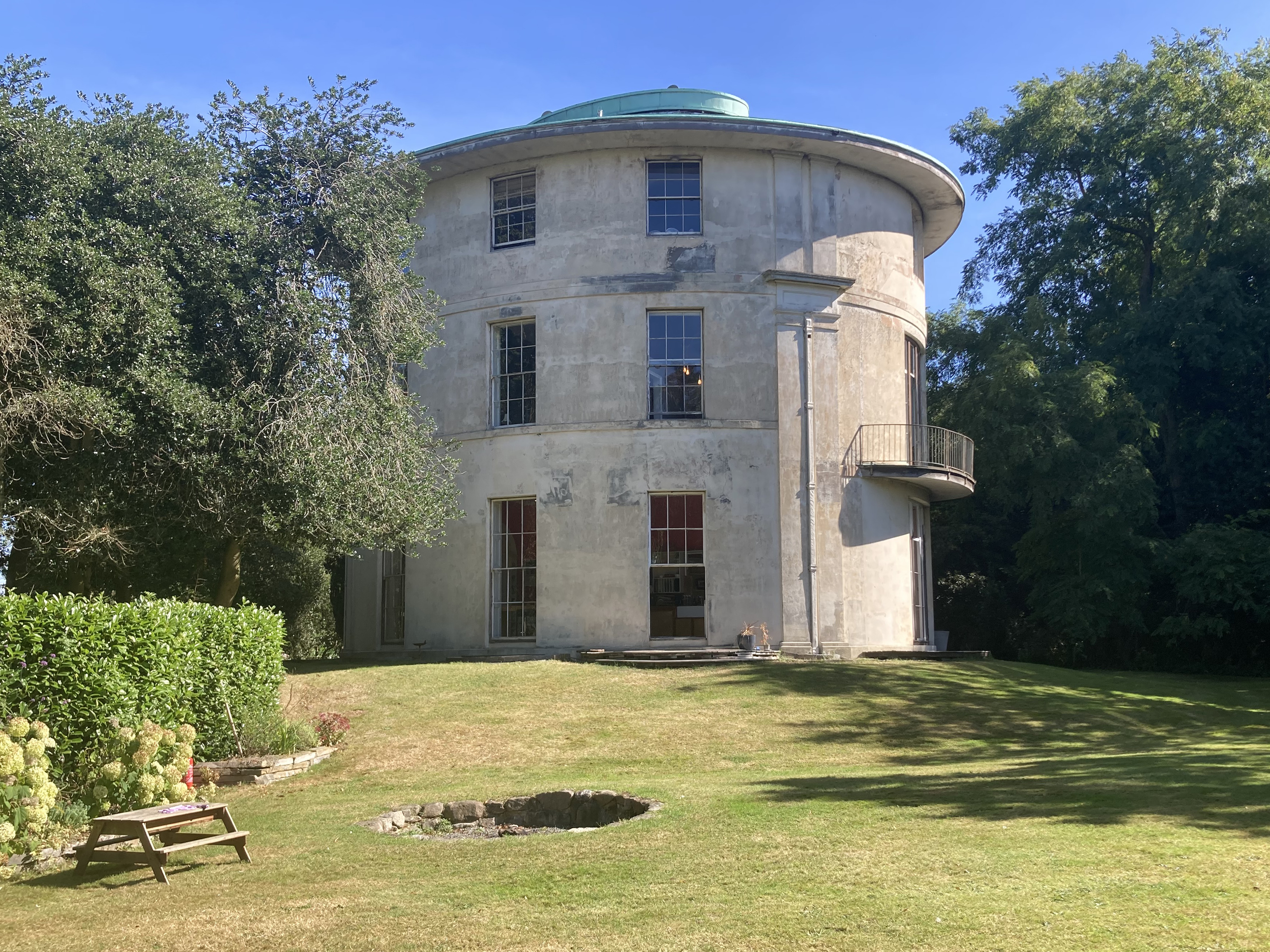
Heap's childhood home, an 18th-century elliptical house in Havering-atte-Bower called the Round House. She purchased it in 2006 and converted its basement into a recording studio.

Imogen Jennifer Jane Heap was born on 9 December 1977 in Romford, England. She was named after British composer Imogen Holst, as her mother, who worked as an art therapist, wanted Heap to become a cellist like Holst. Heap's father worked as a construction rock retailer. Her parents divorced when she was twelve years old. Her maternal great-grandfather is the Scottish painter James Paterson, a figure in the Glasgow Boys art movement. Her brother also works with construction rocks and her sister, Juliet, worked as a town planner in London. In November 2019, while cycling through Patagonia, Juliet died from polytrauma after falling off of her bike and hitting her head in Río Gallegos.

Heap was raised in the Round House, a Grade II* listed elliptical house in Havering-atte-Bower near Romford built in 1792; she later bought the house from her father when it was put on the market in 2006 and converted its basement, which had been her play room as a child, into a recording studio called the Hideaway. When she was one year old, she was diagnosed with osteomyelitis in her left leg. She played music from an early age, first learning to play her mother's piano at age two due to "wanting attention" as a middle child and realising, according to her, that "it was something [she] could make a lot of noise with". She has also stated that "everyone was playing music" in her family home growing up and that she rarely listened to the radio.

She did not enjoy playing the music of classical composers such as Bach and Beethoven, and would instead attempt to play in their style to convince her parents she was practicing their music. As a child, she recorded music by recording herself playing piano on cassette, then recording herself again singing over it. At around age 10, she composed Christmas carols for her school's choir. She soon began taking lessons and became classically trained in several instruments, including piano, cello, and clarinet, while attending Friends' School, a private, Quaker-run boarding school in Saffron Walden. She has stated that she found being at school "extremely boring" and was "everyone's worst nightmare" while there, spending much of her time smoking, drinking, and experimenting with drugs. She performed frequently at school recitals in order to avoid being punished for bad behaviour.

Due to being placed a year above children her age, Heap has stated she did not get along with many people from the school and spent most of her time in the music room practising piano. She stated, "In boarding school ... I was mocked about the clothes I wore, the way I looked, whatever. People there really did regard me as some kind of freak from the middle of nowhere." Her music teacher—who, she has said, considered her "really irritating"—would send her to the school's music technology room as punishment, where she taught herself how to sample music. At age twelve, she also taught herself how to use Cubase on an Atari ST computer at Friends' School. By the age of thirteen, she had begun writing songs. At age fifteen, she started using reel-to-reel recording to record her music and using a home computer to program it. She eventually got expelled from school after telling her matron to "fuck off", but since they still needed her to perform at the end-of-year concert, lived with the headmistress and practised piano for the rest of the year.

== Career ==
=== 1995–1996: Almo Sounds and Acacia ===
At age 16, Heap started studying at the BRIT School for Performing Arts & Technology in Croydon, South London, with plans to write orchestral music, where she first began regularly singing and writing songs. She recorded her first song to feature her vocals, "Missing You", which was released on the BRIT School's Class of 1994 album and earned her attention from manager Mickey Modern after he saw her performance at a talent showcase. After being introduced to Nik Kershaw by Modern, Heap recorded demos which were taken to Rondor Music. Several months later, Heap signed her first record contract, aged 18, with independent record label Almo Sounds.

In 1996, Heap began working as a guest vocalist with the British experimental pop band Acacia, whose members included her later collaborator Guy Sigsworth. Her first major live solo performance was as part of the line-up for the 1996 Prince's Trust Concert in Hyde Park, where she played in between performances by Eric Clapton and the Who.

=== 1997–1999: I Megaphone ===
Heap's debut commercial single, "Getting Scared", was released in 1997 and included on the soundtrack for the 1998 horror film I Still Know What You Did Last Summer. Her debut studio album, I Megaphone, was released on 16 June 1998, through Almo. "Getting Scared", "Shine", and "Come Here Boy" were released as the album's singles in the United Kingdom. I Megaphone was made with several producers, including Sigsworth, Kershaw, Dave Stewart of Eurythmics, and David Kahne. It featured personal lyricism and critics compared it heavily to the works of fellow female singer-songwriters Tori Amos, Kate Bush, Alanis Morissette, and Fiona Apple. She toured the album in the US and Europe from 1998 to 1999, though Almo cut funding for her tour in the UK to promote I Megaphone. I Megaphone received airplay on various American radio stations but was a commercial failure, as Almo did little to promote it. Soon after its release, Almo Sounds was acquired by Universal, forcing its artists to either move to other labels or be released from their contracts; Heap was consequently dropped from the label.

During her time as an unsigned artist, Heap collaborated with British hip hop band Urban Species on the 1998 single "Blanket". It became Heap's first charting single and peaked at number 56 on the UK Singles Chart. The song would later appear in Limp Bizkit frontman Fred Durst's 2005 sex tape.

=== 2000–2004: Frou Frou ===
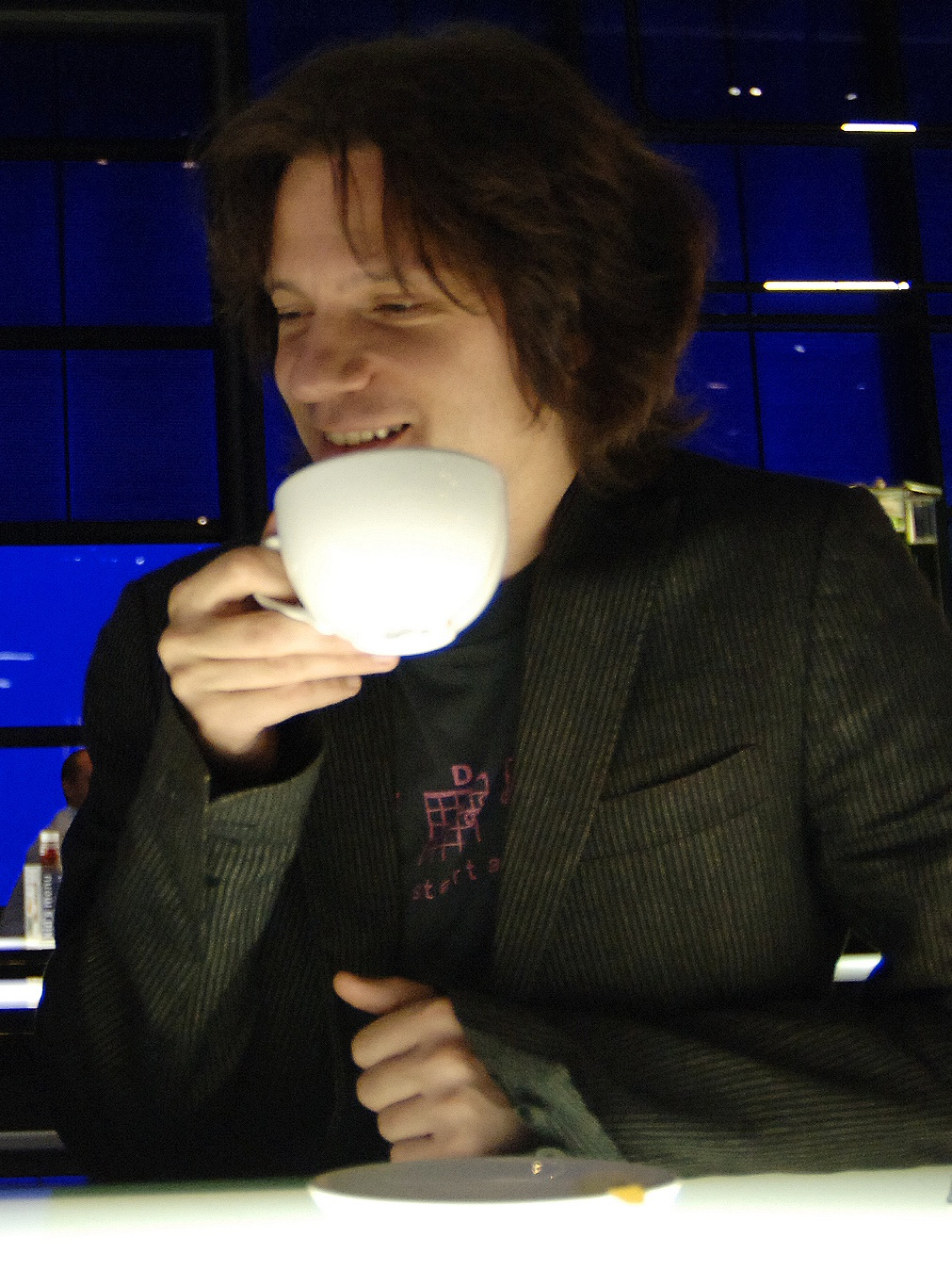
In 2000, Heap formed the musical duo Frou Frou with record producer and frequent collaborator Guy Sigsworth (pictured in 2007).

In 2000, Heap and Sigsworth formed the electronic duo Frou Frou, with plans to record an album featuring a different singer, rapper, or poet on each song. She described the formation of the duo as "very organic and spontaneous". Heap also appeared as a featured vocalist on two songs—"Dirty Mind" and "Rollin' and Tumblin'"—from the 2001 album You Had It Coming by English guitarist Jeff Beck and on the American rock band Rustic Overtones' 2001 album ¡Viva Nueva!.

Frou Frou's first and only album, Details, was released through Island Records and MCA Records on 15 July 2002. The duo had no plans to record a sophomore album. Its lead single "Breathe In" was described as their breakout hit and its song "Let Go" became popular after being used on the soundtrack for Zach Braff's 2004 film Garden State, which won a Grammy Award. By 2009, Details had sold 284,000 copies. It received positive reviews from Drowned in Sound and AllMusic. The album received minimal marketing from Island and sold poorly, prompting Island to drop Frou Frou from the label, though they offered Heap a solo deal. She turned it down, stating in 2006, "If you had taken a shirt into a dry cleaners and they burned it, would you then go, 'Thanks very much. I'll bring in my other dry cleaning tomorrow'?" Frou Frou disbanded, briefly reforming to record a cover of "Holding Out for a Hero" for the 2004 film Shrek 2.

Heap recorded a rendition of the song "I'm a Lonely Little Petunia" for the seventh episode of the fourth season of the HBO drama series Six Feet Under, which premiered in August 2004. Her rendition was included as the album closer for the 2005 soundtrack album Six Feet Under, Vol. 2: Everything Ends. In September 2004, she performed at Time for Change, a benefit concert advocating for Americans living in the United Kingdom to submit absentee ballots for the 2004 United States presidential election.

=== 2005–2006: Speak for Yourself ===
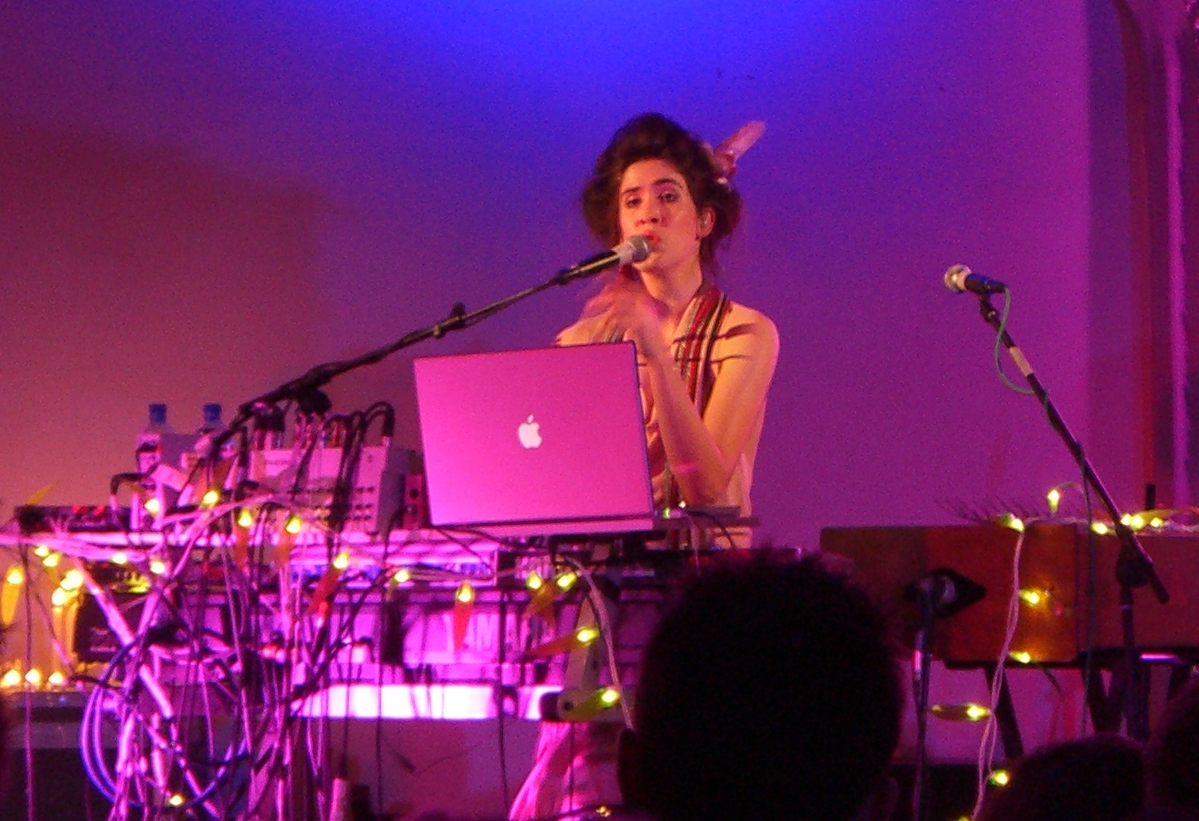
Heap performing at Bush Hall in 2005

After Frou Frou were dropped from Island Records, Heap had accrued £10 thousand in credit card debt. She was denied bank loans due to not being employed and, afraid of signing another record deal, she remortgaged her flat in Waterloo, London, to finance the making of her next studio album. Her property surveyor had been a fan of Frou Frou and offered to provide her the money she needed. Heap used the money to book a session to master the album one year ahead of its recording, to rent a studio at Atomic Studios in Bermondsey, London, that had previously been used by Dizzee Rascal, and to purchase all of the equipment to make it. Partly in response to her frustration with being considered "just the singer" in Frou Frou, Heap aimed to create the album without any outside assistance. She also maintained a blog on her website to chronicle the making of the album.

Heap wrote and provided additional vocals on the Britney Spears song "Over to You Now", a bonus track from her 2005 extended play (EP) Britney & Kevin: Chaotic, which was released to accompany Spears's reality television series of the same name. She co-wrote the song with Robyn and Sigsworth, who produced it. In May 2005, Heap released "Hide and Seek", the lead single from her forthcoming album, with a music video directed by Joel Peissig. The song began gaining traction in the UK when it received praise from radio DJs Jo Whiley and Zane Lowe. It brought her to fame internationally after it was used to soundtrack the season two finale of the Fox teen drama television series The O.C. on the same day as its release; it was also included as the closing track of The OC Mix 5, a soundtrack album for the series released by Warner Bros. Records in November 2005. Its appearance in the series caused it to become especially popular on the iTunes Store and it peaked in the top-40 of the Billboard Digital Songs chart, eventually receiving a gold certification from the Recording Industry Association of America (RIAA) and a silver certification from the British Phonographic Industry (BPI). A Saturday Night Live parody of the scene in 2007 that featured the song brought it to further prominence and made it into a meme online. It also received critical praise, with Kelefa Sanneh calling it "the best thing" on her second studio album for The New York Times and Margaret Farrell of Stereogum listing it as Heap's best song in 2018. It went on to be sampled in the 2009 song "Whatcha Say" by American singer Jason Derulo, which topped the Billboard Hot 100.

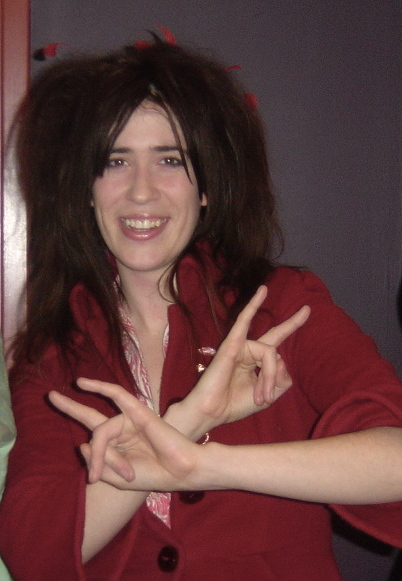
Heap at the Recher Theatre in 2006

Heap self-released her second studio album, Speak for Yourself, through her newly-formed independent record label Megaphonic Records on 18 July 2005. The album was entirely written, produced, recorded, mixed, and arranged by her. Except for a guitar riff played by Beck on the album track "Goodnight and Go" and trumpet played by Arve Henriksen on several tracks, she also played all instruments on the album and designed its packaging and artwork. RCA Records later licensed the album to be released on 1 November 2005 in the US, where it peaked at number 145 on the Billboard 200 album chart in February 2006 and had sold more than 120 thousand units by May of that year, while Sony Records licensed its release throughout Europe. By 2009, Speak for Yourself had sold 431 thousand copies in the US, where it was certified gold, and 39 thousand in the UK. It was also certified gold in Canada. Speak for Yourself has been described as her breakout album. It received mostly positive reviews from critics, with particular praise for Heap's voice, songwriting, and innovation. However, some criticized its production for sounding too polished and overornate. "Goodnight and Go" was released in May 2006 through Sony BMG as Speak for Yourself's second single and debuted at number 56 on the UK Singles Chart. It was followed by "Headlock" in October 2006, which was released through White Rabbit, a sublabel of Sony BMG run by Nick Raphael that later merged into Epic Records UK in 2007.

In August 2005, Heap appeared on the soundtrack for the 2005 romantic comedy film Just Like Heaven, performing a cover of the song "Spooky" by American band Classics IV. In November 2005, Heap wrote and produced the song "Can't Take It In" for the soundtrack of the fantasy film The Chronicles of Narnia: The Lion, the Witch and the Wardrobe, which was released one month later, after a soundtrack appearance by Dido fell through and the film's music supervisor needed a replacement. The song was later nominated for the Grammy Award for Best Song Written For Motion Picture, Television Or Other Visual Media at the 49th Grammy Awards in 2007, where she was also nominated as Best New Artist, and for the World Soundtrack Award for Best Original Song in 2006. Also in November of that year, she performed at a benefit concert at the London Astoria for the Stop the War Coalition, which was headlined by Rachid Taha and Brian Eno and also featured Nitin Sawhney and Mick Jones of The Clash.

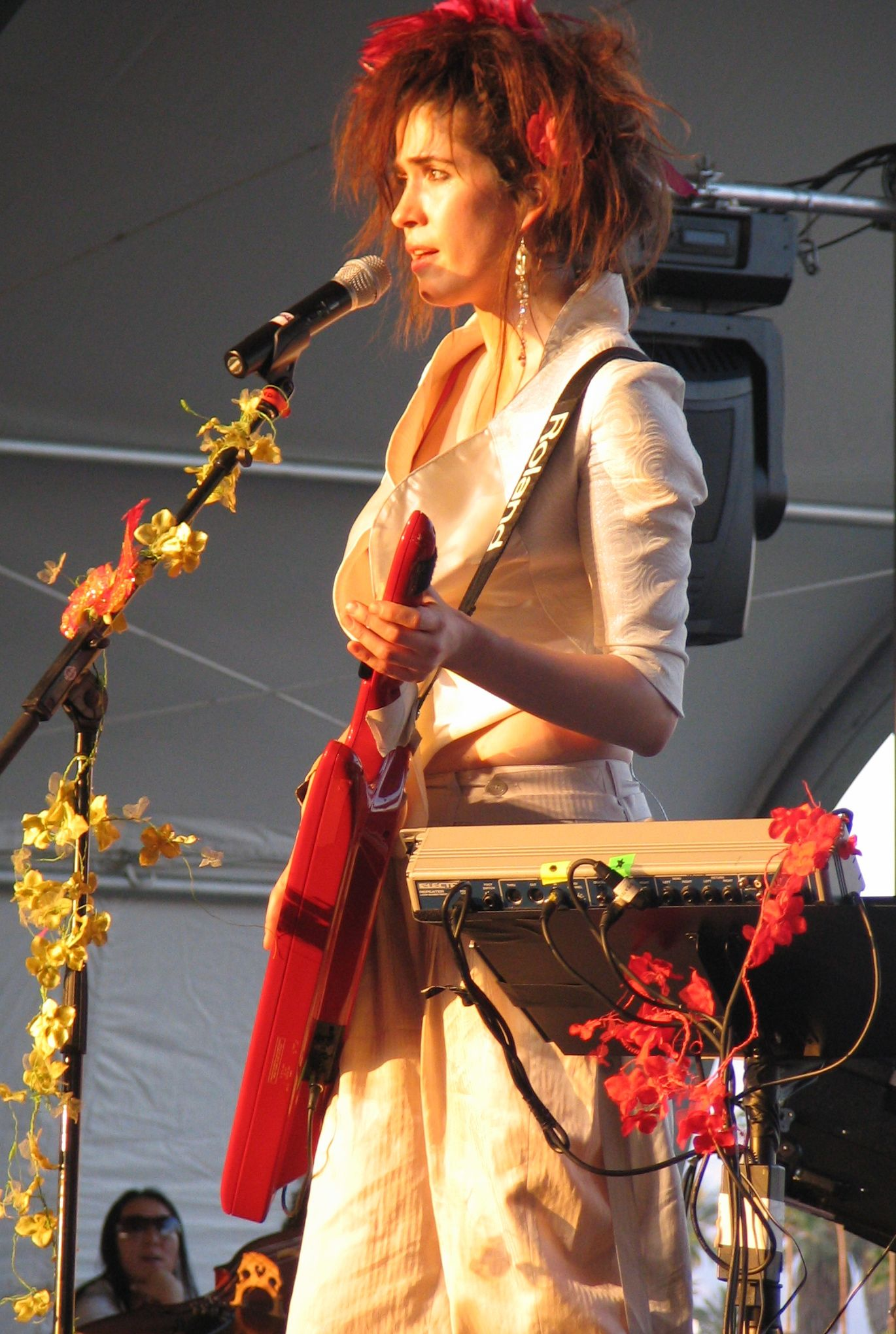
Heap performing at Coachella in 2006

After touring in promotion of Speak for Yourself, she did a one-off show at Scala in London in February 2006. She then performed at Coachella and went on a three-week-long tour of the US in May 2006. Heap recorded an a cappella cover of the Leonard Cohen song "Hallelujah" for the season three finale of The O.C., which premiered in May 2006. By mid-2006, Heap was one of the most popular musical acts on MySpace, with more than one and a half million profile users. She was variously referred to in the media as the first "download diva" for her robust online presence and independent success online in 2006. Heap's music was used as the soundtrack for Pool (No Water), a one-act physical theatre play written by Mark Ravenhill and originally performed by Frantic Assembly, which opened at the Drum Theatre in Plymouth in September 2006. At the 2006 MTVU Woodie Awards, which was voted on by college students, Heap tied with Arctic Monkeys for the most nominations with three (for Best Emerging Artist, Most Original Artist, and Most Downloaded for "Hide and Seek"), though she won none. She wrote and performed the song "Glittering Cloud", which was based on the plague of locusts, as part of an event called the Margate Exodus sponsored by Artangel in November 2006, where ten artists each performed one song based on one of the Plagues of Egypt in Margate. The songs were compiled in the 2006 album Plague Songs. Heap toured the US in late 2006 with beatboxer Kid Beyond, singer-songwriter Levi Weaver, and electronic musician Pixelh8, whom she found through MySpace, as opening acts.

=== 2007–2010: Ellipse ===
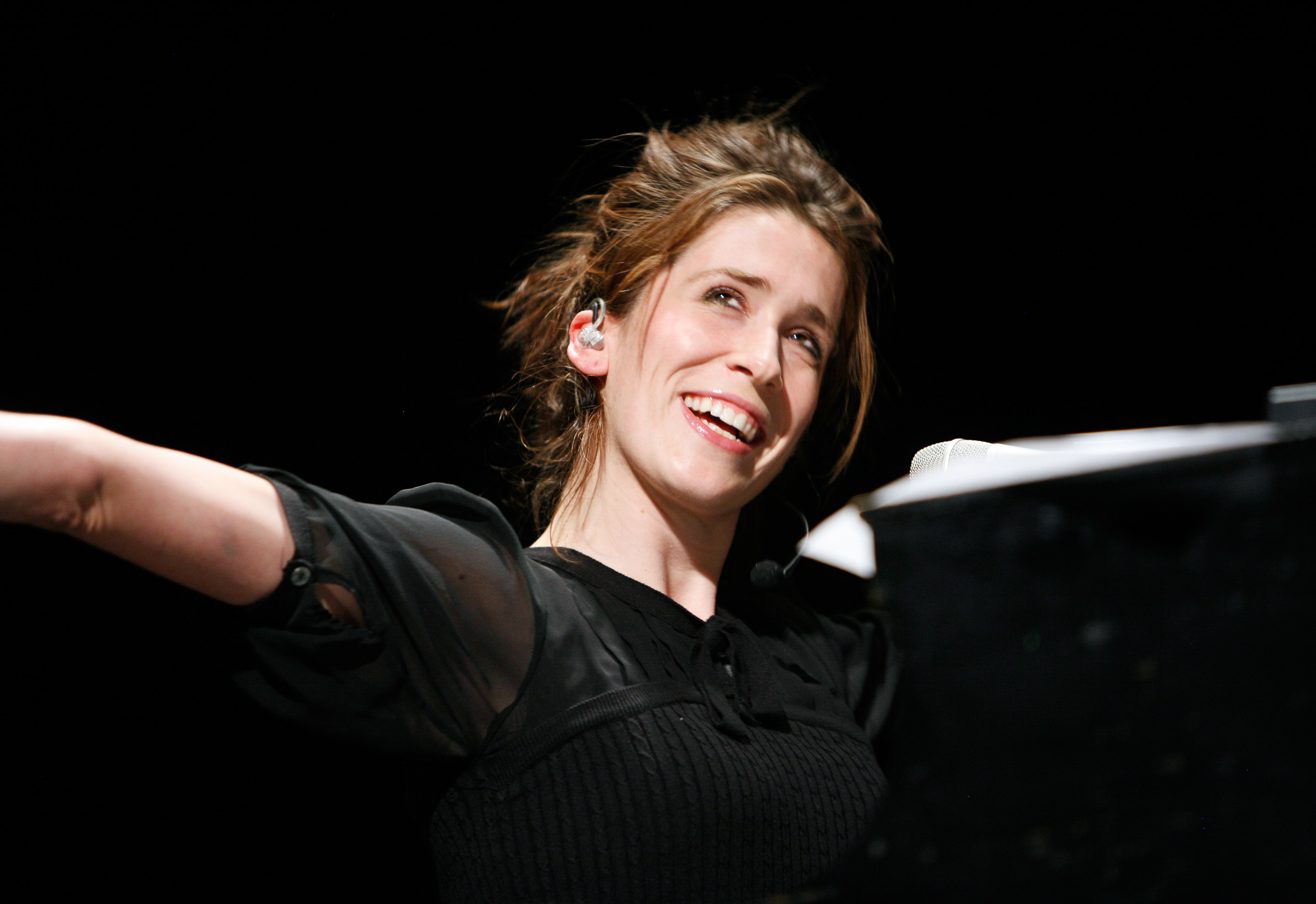
Heap performing at PopTech in 2008

By 2007, Heap's was the fourth most-friended MySpace profile throughout the UK, following Product Red, Gorillaz, and Bullet for My Valentine. I Megaphone was re-released in late 2006 and, in February 2007, she performed two shows—one in Los Angeles and the other in New York City—of material from the album. She was also featured as a guest during Beck's performance at Ronnie Scott's in November 2007 and appeared on two songs from its accompanying live album, Live at Ronnie Scott's, released in 2008, and in its DVD, released in 2009. Heap was featured on English band Temposhark's song "Not That Big" from their debut 2008 studio album The Invisible Line and on Nitin Sawhney's song "Bring It Home" from his 2008 studio album London Undersound. She also appeared on the 2008 compilation album Songs for Tibet: The Art of Peace, which was made by the Art of Peace Foundation in support of the Dalai Lama during the 2008 Tibetan unrest and released in August. In late 2007, she recorded the song "Not Now But Soon" for the soundtrack of the NBC television series Heroes, the album of which was released in March 2008 by the NBC Universal Television, DVD, Music & Consumer Products Group. In October 2008, Heap gave a musical performance in the anti-human trafficking documentary and rockumentary film Call + Response, directed by Justin Dillon.

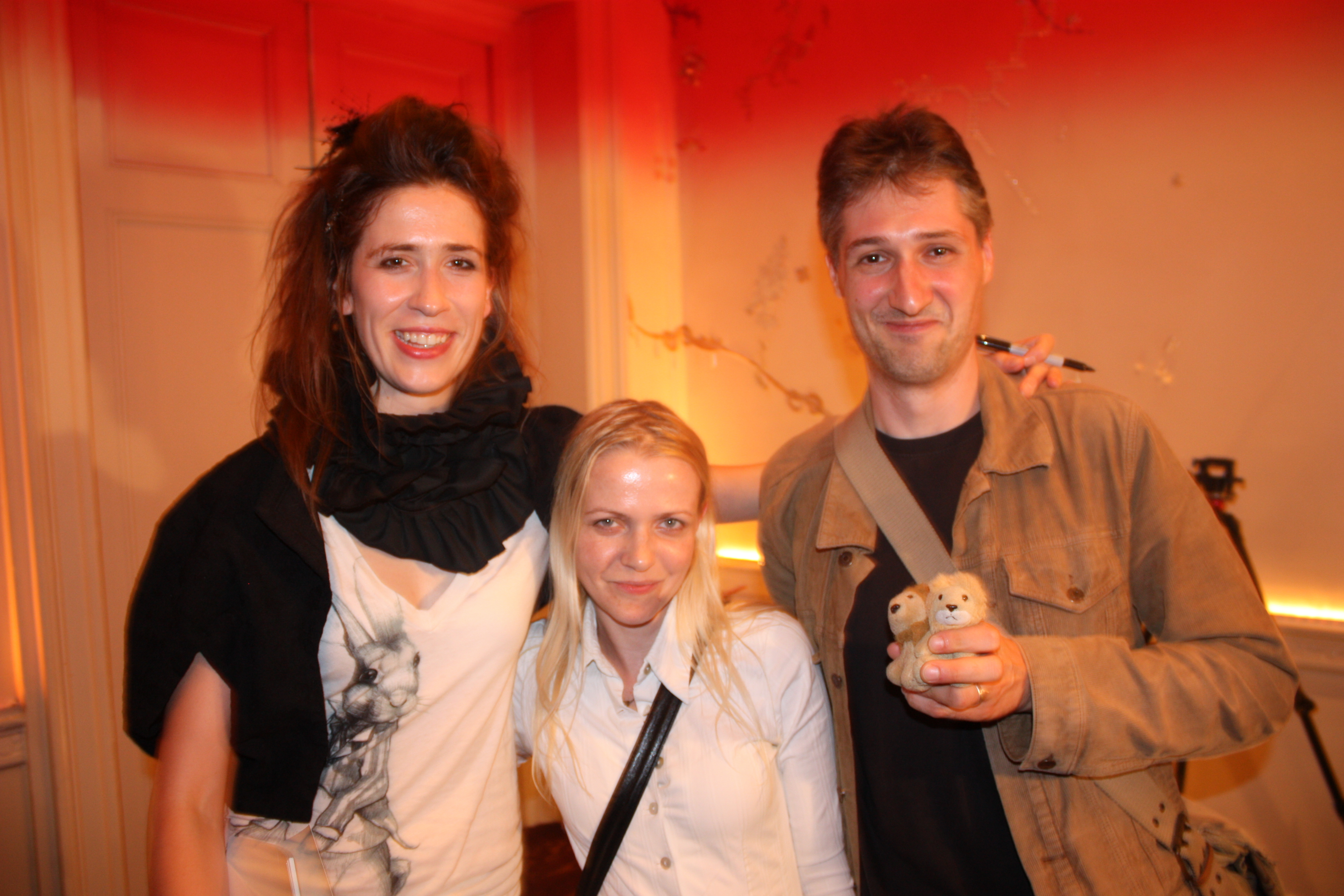
Heap with fans at her Heaptweetup event in London in 2009

Starting in February 2007, Heap began posting YouTube video blogs at the request of a fan to document the making of Ellipse, her third studio album, eventually making a total of 40. She recorded the album in the basement of her childhood home, using sounds from around the house as instruments, while its name was inspired by the house's elliptical shape. Its lead single "First Train Home" premiered on Stereogum and was released to adult alternative and hot AC radio stations through RCA Records in the US in July 2009. Later that month, she released a black-and-white music video for the album's song "Canvas". After completing Ellipse, she held a contest on Flickr for fans to submit photos to use as the album's artwork in exchange for a small cash prize. In July, prior to the album's release, an advance promotional copy was listed on eBay. After Heap tweeted about her frustration over it, the bidding price was raised to over £10 million by fans and the listing was soon taken down by eBay. The release date of Ellipse was pushed back multiple times; it was eventually released in the UK on 24 August 2009 through Megaphonic and Epic Records and in the US on 25 August 2009 through RCA. Like Speak for Yourself, Ellipse was made largely alone by Heap, who wrote, produced, engineered, and mixed the album in its entirety, though it was mastered by Simon Heyworth. Describing the two-year-long process of recording Ellipse as laborious and "bordering on torture", Heap stated that it would be her "last album like this" and that her following album would involve making one song a month and releasing it soon after.

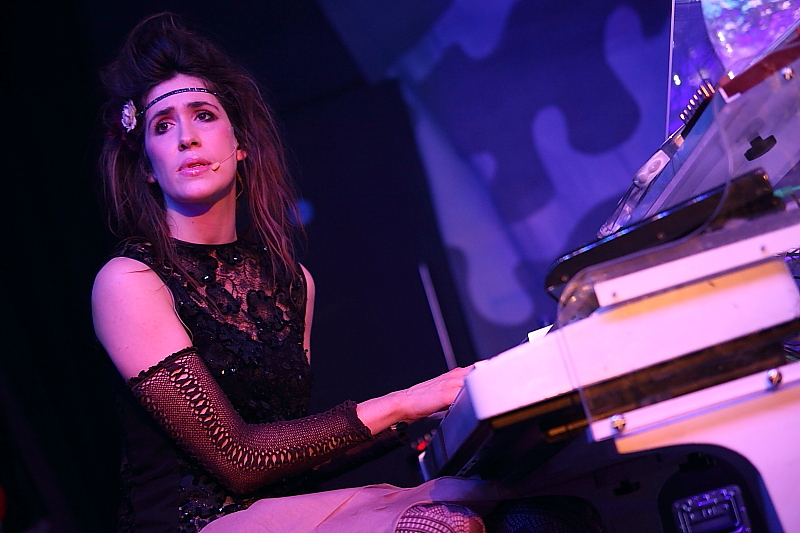
Heap performing at O2 Academy Birmingham in 2010

Critics gave Ellipse mostly favorable reviews, with compliments toward its eclecticism, Heap's understated vocals, and for combining electronic music with natural, human elements, but criticism toward its overall sameness and its lack of sonic deviation from Speak for Yourself. Critics also remarked that it had no moments comparable to "Hide and Seek" and others compared its sound to that of Dido. It debuted at number five on the Billboard 200 chart, making it Heap's highest-ever entry on the chart after selling 48 thousand copies in its first week, and became her first appearance on the UK Albums Chart, where it debuted in the top-40. Heap began touring in promotion of Ellipse in November 2009. It also debuted at number four in Canada. She received two nominations for the album at the 49th Annual Grammy Awards: one for Best Pop Instrumental Performance for its song "The Fire", and the other for Best Engineered Album, Non-Classical. She won the latter award to become its second-ever female recipient, following Trina Shoemaker's 1999 win for Sheryl Crow's The Globe Sessions. Everything In-Between: The Story of Ellipse, a documentary by Justine Pearsall chronicling the making of Ellipse, was released on DVD in November 2010.

By September 2009, Heap was the 117th most-followed user overall on Twitter, with more than 960 thousand followers. She was featured on the song "My Secret Friend" by IAMX from his 2009 album Kingdom of Welcome Addiction and contributed vocals to Mika's song "By the Time" from his album The Boy Who Knew Too Much, released in September 2009. Also that month, she performed "First Train Home" on the Late Show with David Letterman. She won the Ivor Novello Award for International Achievement in May 2010. She went on tour in 2010, starting in Los Angeles and performing at V Festival, Coachella, and Ilosaarirock. She auditioned musicians for the tour using the livestreaming service Vokle, which she later promoted at Midem and invested seed money in the following year. The seventh leg of the tour took place in the UK in the fall of 2010. It included a performance at the Royal Albert Hall, where she premiered Love the Earth, a short nature documentary created and scored by her, which consisted of clips sent in by fans of "why they love the Earth".

=== 2011–2015: Sparks ===
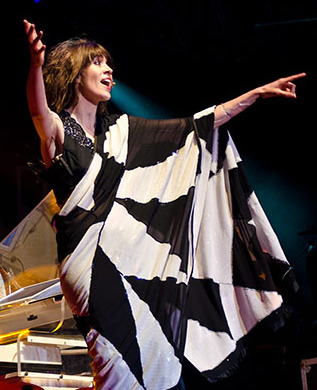
Heap performing at NH7 Weekender in 2011

In March 2011, for the Birds Eye View's Sound & Silents program, Heap composed an a cappella score for Germaine Dulac's seminal 1928 surrealist film The Seashell and the Clergyman, which she performed at the Latitude Festival that year with the Holst Singers. She performed it again, conducted by Hugh Brunt, at the Roundhouse in February the following year. In April of that year, Heap held Songs for Christchurch, a benefit concert in Christchurch, New Zealand to help rebuild the Unlimited Paenga Tawhiti High School, following a severe earthquake in the city two months prior.

Also in March 2011, Heap began working on her then–unnamed fourth studio album, which she said would be largely inspired by her trips to Asian countries such as Bhutan, China, and India, and revealed that she would be writing and releasing a new single for the album once every three months. She recorded and released the album's lead single, then released under the working title "Heapsong1" and eventually released commercially as "Lifeline" with a music video, via Ustream. It was made using crowdsourced audio samples, videos, and photos from fans and based on a story she read about the 2011 Tōhoku earthquake and tsunami. "Propeller Seeds", the second single, followed in July 2011, and was billed as the first song to use 3D audio. The third single from the album, "Neglected Space", was created as part of Heap's project with charity organization Clear Village to restore a Georgian walled garden in Bedfords Park and released in October 2011. She starred in the debut episode of the Indian musical reality television series The Dewarists, where she recorded "Minds Without Fear", the fourth single from Sparks, with Indian production duo Vishal–Shekhar. Both "Neglected Space" and "Minds Without Fear" were released in October 2011.

Heap recorded her song "Xizi She Knows" during a trip to Hangzhou, which was partially funded by PRS for Music and the British Council. It was released as the fifth single from the album in February 2012. She premiered her song "The Listening Chair" at the Royal Albert Hall's Prom 62 event in August 2012. "You Know Where to Find Me" was then released as the album's sixth single. She collaborated with Canadian record producer Deadmau5 on the song "Telemiscommunications", which was included on his 2012 studio album, Album Title Goes Here and released as the eighth single from Sparks in March 2013 alongside an animated music video. Her single "Run-Time" was made using a generative music app, which she designed with RjDj and Intel that created custom music for running, and was released in July 2014 with a music video.

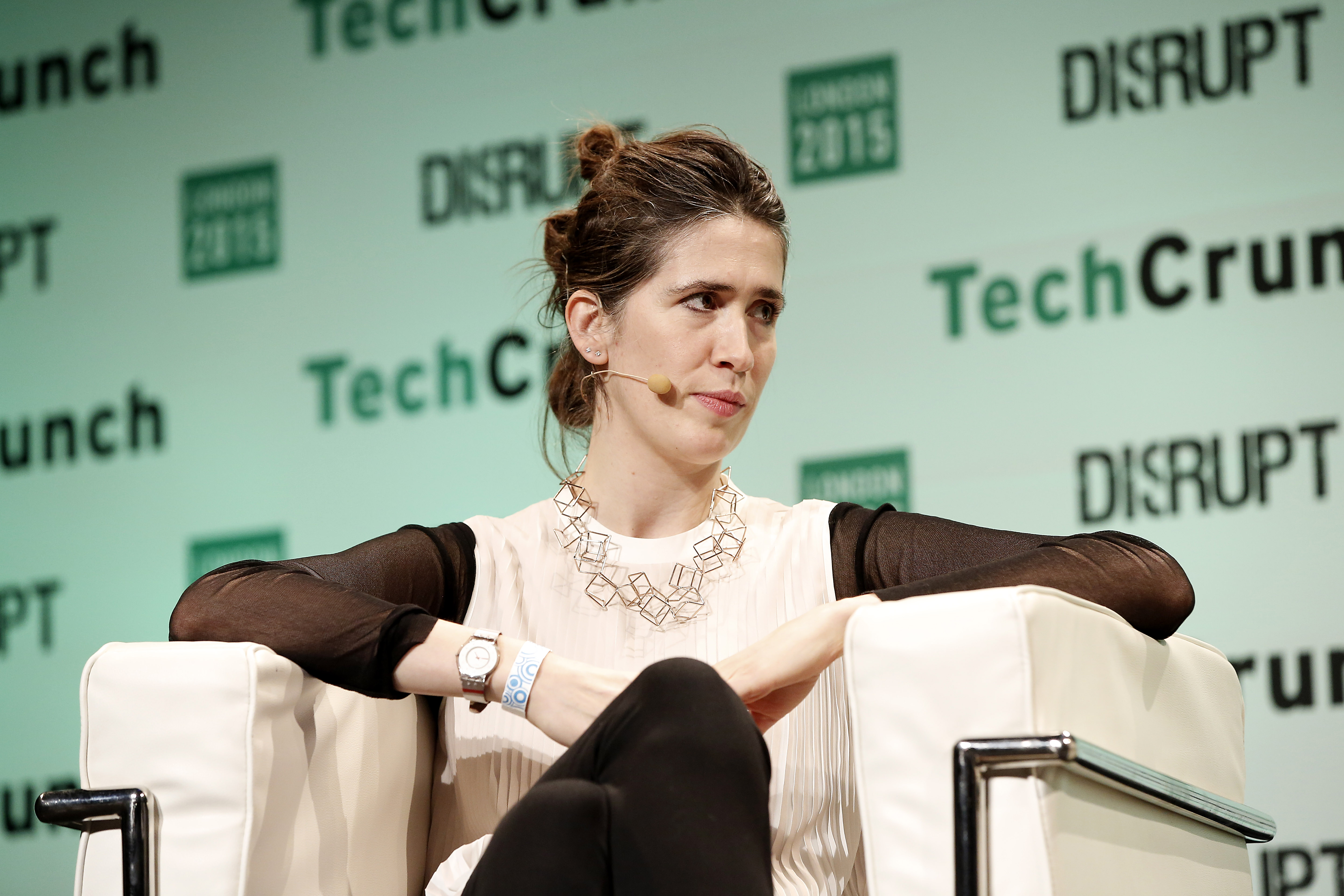
Heap at TechCrunch Disrupt in 2015

The title of Sparks, Heap's fourth studio album, was announced in September 2013, and the album was released on 18 August 2014 through Megaphonic Records. It debuted at number 40 on the UK Albums Chart, at number 21 on the Billboard 200, and at number one on Billboard's Dance/Electronic Albums chart. Its deluxe boxset was nominated for the AIM Independent Music Award for Special Catalogue Release of the Year and for the Grammy Award for Best Boxed or Special Limited Edition Package in 2015.

Heap co-wrote and produced the Taylor Swift song "Clean", which appeared as the closer to Swift's fifth studio album 1989 (2014) and led to her being part of the production team that won Album of the Year at the 58th Grammy Awards. She returned to produce "Clean (Taylor's Version)", which peaked at number 30 on the Billboard Hot 100, for Swift's 2023 re-recording of 1989. In October 2015, Heap released the single "Tiny Human" using her blockchain-based platform Mycelia. By 2017, it had made US$133.20.

=== 2016–2020: Harry Potter and collaborations ===
After being contacted by movement director Steven Hoggett, Heap reworked and composed music from her catalogue to be used as the music in Harry Potter and the Cursed Child, the eighth installment of the Harry Potter series in the form of a West End play that opened in the summer of 2016. For her work on the play, she received several award nominations, including for the Grammy Award for Best Musical Theater Album, the Laurence Olivier Award for Outstanding Achievement in Music and the Outer Critics Circle Award for Outstanding New Score (Broadway or Off-Broadway), and won the Drama Desk Award for Outstanding Music in a Play.

Heap was one of the artists featured in an episode of the 2016 PBS docuseries Soundbreaking and she narrated and composed music for the 2016 documentary Crossing Bhutan, which premiered at the Santa Barbara International Film Festival. Also in 2016, she was commissioned by French advertising agency BETC and British company Cow & Gate, in collaboration with researchers from Goldsmiths, University of London, to help write a song which would be proven to "make babies happy", which was eventually titled "The Happy Song". The track was engineered through several months of scientific testing on babies, also incorporating sounds from a survey of UK parents about which noises made their babies happy, and was released in October 2016. Its animated music video was released in December 2019 and had 62 million views on YouTube by 2024. "The Happy Song" was certified silver in the UK by the BPI and certified gold in the US, with Heap identifying it in 2019 as her second most commercially successfully song after "Hide and Seek".

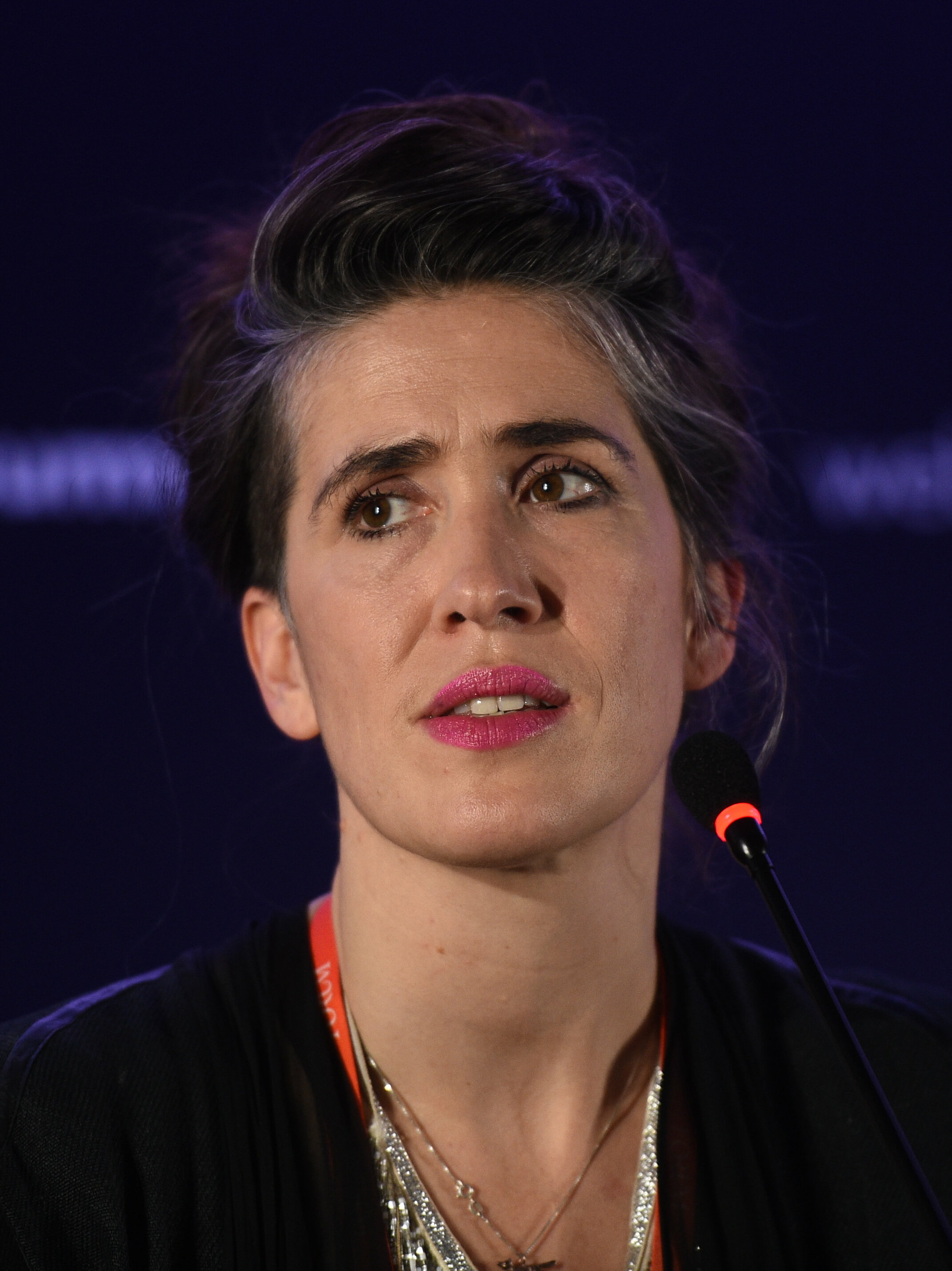
Heap at the 2018 Web Summit

Heap wrote, produced and recorded the song "Magic Me" as the score for the 2017 animated short film Escape, which premiered at the 2017 Tribeca Film Festival in April of that year. She performed "Hide and Seek" at the benefit concert and television special One Love Manchester in Manchester in June 2017. Her performance was praised by critics as "powerful" and "melancholy". The following month, she was featured on the song "We Drift On" by British singer-songwriter Dan Black from his second studio album Do Not Revenge. She announced in November 2017 that she would be reuniting Frou Frou with Guy Sigsworth and would be embarking on the Mycelia World Tour with him to promote the release of Mycelia's Creative Passport program. In March 2018, she was awarded the Inspiration Award at the 2018 Music Producers Guild Awards. Heap also recorded "The Quiet" as the end credits song for the 2018 Square Enix video game The Quiet Man.

On 18 September 2018, Heap released The Music of Harry Potter and the Cursed Child in Four Contemporary Suites, a condensed soundtrack album of the play, which peaked at number two on Billboard's Classical Albums chart. An interview with her appeared in the Alex Winter-directed documentary Trust Machine: The Story of Blockchain in November 2018. The Mycelia World Tour began in Europe in 2018, while the North American leg began in April 2019, marking her first North American tour in nine years and her first tour as part of Frou Frou since 2003. That same month, she and Sigsworth released "Guitar Song (Live)", their first Frou Frou song in 15 years, through We Are Hear. She gave a lecture at Boston Calling Music Festival in May 2019. In June 2019, she announced that she planned to release an album consisting of collaborations in 2020, the lead single of which would be one of three versions of "The Quiet". She also performed on NPR's Tiny Desk Concerts series that same month.

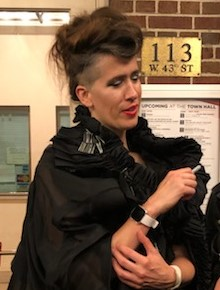
Heap at The Town Hall in 2019

She hosted the 62nd Annual Grammy Awards Premiere Ceremony in January 2020. In April 2020, she was credited as a lead artist on the commercial re-release of the 2011 instrumental "I'm God" by American record producer Clams Casino, which was initially produced for American rapper Lil B in 2009 using a then–unauthorised sample of Heap's song "Just for Now" and is considered by critics to be the beginning of the cloud rap subgenre. It was certified gold in the US in 2024. She also released the single "Phase and Flow" as part of a collaboration with IBM that month. The following month, she performed during Royal Albert Hall's Royal Albert Home virtual concert series. Heap gave a livestreamed closing performance for the Virtual Design Festival held by Dezeen in July 2020. During the COVID-19 pandemic, she launched a self-titled app for fans to view unreleased material and demos and participate in listening parties with her through Discord for a monthly fee. In November 2020, she was one of the artists to announce the nominations for the 63rd Annual Grammy Awards on a livestream. She released the single "Last Night of an Empire", which was inspired by conversations with fans about the end of Donald Trump's first presidency, in December 2020.

=== 2021–present: Commercial resurgence of "Headlock" and I Am ___ ===
Heap hosted a panel at SXSW about livestreaming and extended reality in March 2021. In late March 2022, she partnered with Symphonic Distribution to re-release previous material, including a handful of Frou Frou demos, which will compile into the Off Cuts release. The first single "A New Kind of Love (Demo)" was released in April of that year. In 2022, she produced the instrumental soundtrack for Cate Blanchett and Danny Kennedy's climate change–focused Audible podcast Climate of Change, on which she also appeared as a guest, with nature documentarian Dan O'Neill. Its soundtrack double album, Chordata Bytes, was also released that year. Heap and Clams Casino were featured on ASAP Rocky's song "I Smoked Away My Brain", a mashup of his song "Demons" with "I'm God" which was released in 2023 and appeared on Billboard's Hot R&B/Hip-Hop Songs chart, also receiving a platinum certification from the RIAA.

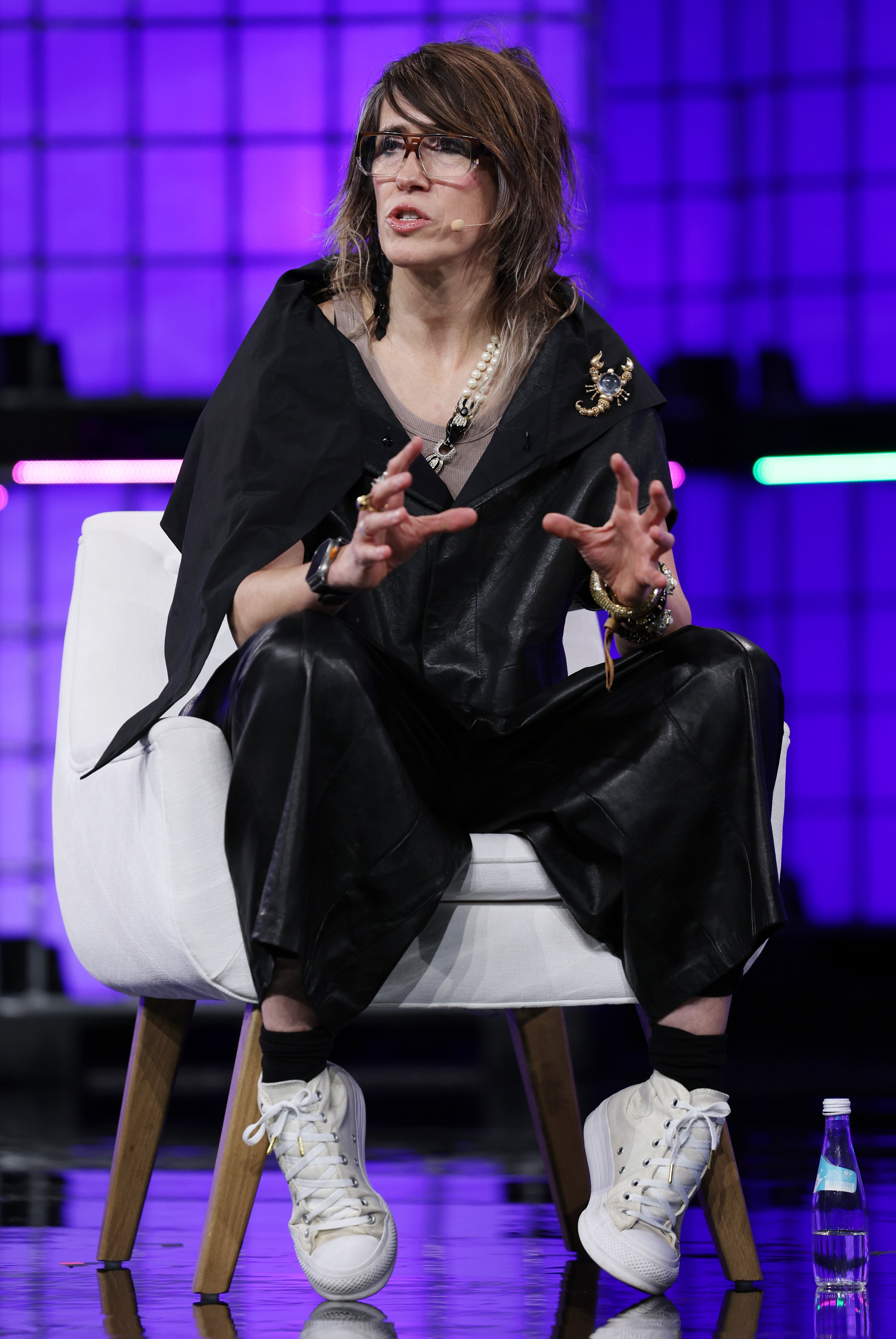
Heap at the 2024 Web Summit

As part of a project called The Living Song, Heap released the single "What Have You Done to Me?" in November 2024, which was created using the melody of "Hide and Seek" and first previewed through the Calm app in January. She also released the single "Noise" on the 20th.

Video edits of the horror video game Mouthwashing using Heap's song "Headlock" on TikTok brought it to popularity online and on streaming services in late 2024. It became Heap's first Billboard Hot 100 entry, debuting at number 100 in January 2025. It also appeared on the Canadian Hot 100, also debuting at number 100. It peaked at number 30 on the UK Singles Chart in February 2025, making it her first top-40 entry, and was certified silver in the UK in March 2025.

In January 2025, Heap spoke with FKA Twigs as part of Spotify's video podcast series Countdown To for her studio album Eusexua. Heap and Sigsworth reunited as Frou Frou in March 2025 to perform "Let Go" at Zach Braff's 20th anniversary concert for the Garden State soundtrack. Her side project Him Gone Ape, an anagram of her name and billed as her "playful" persona, began in April 2025. She was featured along with the Kid Laroi on the Australian drill group Onefour's song "Distant Strangers", which sampled "Headlock" and was released in June 2025. Her single "Aftercare" was released in October 2025. It was included on her EP I Am ___, which was released in October 2025 and also included her two singles from November 2024. An experimental music video directed by Daria Korsak featuring a suite of all three songs was released with the EP. Also that month, Heap released a remastered version of Speak for Yourself through Megaphonic for its 20th anniversary.

In 2026 she wrote the end credits track, titled "Chapter 4", for a documentary film presented by Benedict Cumberbatch, titled How to Live on Earth, which was released on YouTube on 20 September 2026. The film is about how we can live in ways that help to protect nature and the planet.

== Technology ventures ==
In October 2015, Heap created the blockchain-based platform Mycelia, which she created as a decentralized musical database for artists to share their music on and enforce smart contracts using Ethereum. Mycelia's Creative Passport programme is a personalised profile for artists not signed to a major label. In April 2021, she collaborated with the now-defunct music platform Endlesss to release the Firsts Collection, a series of non-fungible tokens (NFTs) featuring snippets from her online jam sessions and visuals by designer Andy Carne, with five percent of the proceeds donated to the carbon dioxide removal company Nori. They were sold on the NFT marketplace OpenSea. After previewing it at Web Summit 2024, Heap launched Auracles, a digital rights management platform, in December 2024.

=== Mi.Mu gloves ===
Heap demonstrating the Mi.Mu gloves in a 2014 video for Dezeen

In July 2011, Heap unveiled a pair of in-development, wired musical gloves at the TEDGlobal conference in Edinburgh, Scotland. They were originally developed by Heap with Tom Mitchell, a University of the West of England, Bristol lecturer in music systems, and designed and sewn by Rachel Freire, a costume designer, over the course of the prior two and a half years. They were inspired by another pair of musical gloves developed by engineer Elly Jessop at MIT which Heap had witnessed during a visit to the university's Media Lab. Early versions of Heap's gloves had issues with latency and accuracy. In an interview, Heap stated, "The gloves help me embody those sounds which are hidden inside the computer, for me to physicalise them and bring them out so that I can play them and the audience members will understand what I am doing—rather than fiddling around on a keyboard and mouse which is not very clear—I could just be doing my emails."

The gloves, which eventually came to be known as the Mi.Mu gloves (a name derived from an abbreviation of "me" and "music"), are made from the material Yulex and consist of a hardware board at the wrist developed by Seb Madgwick with an inertial measurement unit used to determine the speed and orientation of the hands, flex sensors over the knuckles, a haptic motor, a removable battery, open palms and LED lights in between the thumb and forefinger which indicate whether or not the user is recording. Open Sound Control data is sent to a computer, which can perform a number of different actions, including adjusting volume, recording loops and filtering sound. The gloves also come with a custom gesture recognition software called Glover that can be integrated with music production apps such as Ableton Live, Pro Tools, and MainStage and was released for standalone purchase in 2021. An accompanying iOS app, Gliss, was also released in 2021 to be used with Glover. They use 802.11 Wi-Fi.

Heap recorded her song "Me the Machine" using an early version of the gloves, debuting the single during a livestream on Earth Day in 2012. Also in 2012, she showcased the Mi.Mu gloves on an episode of the BBC television series Dara Ó Briain's Science Club. Heap began crowdfunding to produce more pairs of the gloves in April 2014 on Kickstarter, with a goal of £200,000, but the campaign failed to meet its target. However, the Mi.Mu project found investors who collaborated with Heap's team to continue to develop the gloves. An early investor and user of the gloves was American singer Ariana Grande, who used the gloves during her second concert tour, the Honeymoon Tour, in 2015. In April 2019, the Mi.Mu gloves became publicly available for pre-order. In 2021, they sold for £2,500 a pair. Popular Science included the Mi.Mu gloves on their list of the 100 greatest innovations of 2019.

=== Artificial intelligence ===
During the COVID-19 pandemic, Heap began work on a project called "Augmented Imogen", meant to be an artificial intelligence (AI) version of herself. In late 2024, she began developing Mogen, also known as AI.Mogen (stylized in lowercase), an AI assistant that began as a premium feature on her app. She developed it with an audio engineer and trains it using Plaud Note, a ChatGPT-powered voice recorder. She has stated that it is based on "anything [she has] ever said or done" and designed to answer questions about her life and work for fans and to collaborate with her on future projects while replicating her voice. Heap used AI.Mogen on her 2024 remix of Slovak singer Karin Ann's song "False Gold", to produce the final part of her 2024 song "What Have You Done to Me?", and to process the vocals on her 2025 song "Aftercare". Paul G. Oliver, a lecturer at Edinburgh Napier University, wrote for The Conversation that Mogen was "a fascinating case study into the evolving relationship between music, technology and human creativity" and "a refreshing alternative" to fears of AI replacing human musicians, while Emma Keates of The A.V. Club derisively compared the project to Heap going "full Black Mirror", specifically likening it to the show's episode "Rachel, Jack and Ashley Too".

Heap has praised the use of generative AI in art and music and pushed back against concerns about its environmental impacts and its potential to replace human musicians, but has been critical of the lack of transparency about its training data, its potential for copyright infringement, and it being used to create music that replicates her preexisting compositions without proper credit. She has also criticized AI music creation programs like Suno and Udio as "boring" and record labels making deals with AI startups, while advocating for the use of ethical AI. Jen Lennon of The A.V. Club wrote in 2024 that her "open-armed embrace of AI" was "a notable deviation from the way many other artists, writers, and actors have strongly denounced" AI, while, in 2025, Brian Hiatt of Rolling Stone called her one of "vanishingly few" musicians to publicly advocate for its use in music.

Heap was a judge for the AI Song Contest 2021, an international competition for music made using AI. Heap was one of one thousand artists credited on Is This What We Want?, a silent protest album consisting entirely of recordings of empty recording studios, which was released in February 2025 in response to the UK government's proposed changes to copyright laws that would allow artificial intelligence firms to train large language models (LLMs) on copyrighted music. She announced her partnership with the generative AI music company Jen for their StyleFilter program, which allows users to generate songs with the same "vibe" as licensed songs on the platform, at Web Summit in November 2024. She then released StyleFilters for her songs "Headlock", "Just for Now", "Goodnight and Go", "Last Night of an Empire", and "What Have You Done to Me?" through Auracles in April 2025.

== Artistry ==
I just love crafting and shaping sounds. Actually, many of the sounds that I work with start off as organic instruments – guitar, piano, clarinet, etc. But I do love the rigidity of electronic drums... I would record live drums, and then I would spend a day editing them to take the life out of them. I like to breathe my own life into these sounds, and I do try to keep the "air" in the music.

— Imogen Heap

In the late 1990s, Heap's music was largely alternative rock. However, after forming and subsequently disbanding the electronic duo Frou Frou, whose work on their sole album to date, Details, was mainly electropop, her music became primarily based in pop, specifically electropop, art pop, alt-pop, and synth-pop. She has written, produced and engineered most of her music on her own. She has also stated that she rarely listens to music, but draws inspiration from TED conferences.

Heap plays a number of instruments, including the piano, clarinet, cello, guitar, keytar, drums, waterphone, and array mbira. She extensively uses manipulated electronic sounds as an integral part of her music. She also mixes ambient sound into her music and has commented that "certain sounds give the music a width and a space, and that's important." CNN stated that Heap is known for "her distinctive fusion of soft acoustic sounds, electronica and tech".

Heap has said that she "really [doesn't] like writing lyrics" and called them "a pain in the ass", describing herself as feeling "much more" comfortable producing. Heap has compared her lyrics to "secret messages to my friends or my boyfriend or my mum or my dad" and stated that they are often written "in the heat of the moment [about] something [that] has just happened".

== Public image and legacy ==
Heap has been regarded as influential in pop music, specifically in electropop and for using technology in her music. NPR's Lindsay Kimbell referred to Heap as a "pioneer of electronic pop" in 2018, while Stephen Thompson said in 2025 on Morning Edition that hers was "a pioneering electro-pop career that stretches back roughly three decades". Billboard called Heap an "electro-pop innovator". In 2018, Stereogum's Margaret Farrell referred to Heap as "pop's unsung pioneer" and "an electronic pop mastermind", going on to describe her as "a mystical force that has loomed over pop music for nearly two decades". In 2019, The New York Times similarly called Heap a "pop pioneer" whose work "has established her as an innovator in musical technology". For Paper, Matt Moen called Heap "the Nikola Tesla of pop music" in that "[her] influence in the field of pop has largely gone unappreciated in her own time". Various outlets, including NPR and New Statesman, have called Heap a "tech pioneer". Patrick Ryan of USA Today wrote that Heap "pioneered" the subgenre of folktronica, which combines elements of folk music and electronica.

Heap is also known for her contributions to film and television soundtracks. She became known as an early adoptee of social media, particularly Twitter, Myspace, and vlogging, to promote her music and interact with her fans. She has expressed praise toward social media's role in music, stating in 2010 that, because of it, "anyone and everyone can get creative and get their voice heard". She is also known for her devoted fanbase, with Ian Youngs describing them for BBC News as "substantial" and "among the most devoted and active in music" in 2010. A 2012 YouGov poll of her fans found that more than half of the respondents lived in the United States, more than three-fourths were born after 1975, and slightly more than half were male. Her renewed success in 2025 through the online popularity of "Headlock" led to an influx of Gen Z fans of her music. Her fashion style has been described as "kooky", "theatrical", "weird", and "flamboyant". Cory Albertson of Paste described her as having "an outlandish visual persona". Her frog-themed outfit at the 49th Annual Grammy Awards has been included on several lists of the most outrageous and iconic Grammys outfits of all time. In 2026, she retrospectively described her "over-the-top" fashion earlier in her career as a response to issues she had with her body image.

Heap has been described as highly influential on pop, hip hop, and R&B musicians and been cited as a musical inspiration by Ariana Grande, Bebe Rexha, Ellie Goulding, Kacey Musgraves, Pentatonix, PinkPantheress, Chloe Bailey, Empress Of, Dawn Richard, Jamila Woods, Muna, Mree, Woodes, Ben Hopkins, Matthew Parker, Red Moon, Michelle Chamuel, Chaz Cardigan, Laura Doggett, GoodLuck, Kool Kojak, and Stars and Rabbit. Heap's songs have also been covered by artists including Pentatonix and Kelly Clarkson, and have been sampled by artists including Grande, Jason Derulo, Wiz Khalifa, Mac Miller, Clams Casino, Lil B, Ryan Hemsworth, Deniro Farrar, Suicideboys, ASAP Rocky, MellowHype, Trinidad James and XV. The sampling of her songs has been considered influential in the subgenre of cloud rap. Her song "Hide and Seek" also served as an influence in creating the soundtrack of the 2025 feature film KPop Demon Hunters.

== Personal life ==
Heap began dating film director Michael Lebor in 2012. They have one daughter, Scout, who was born in November 2014. Heap was diagnosed with attention deficit hyperactivity disorder (ADHD) during the COVID-19 pandemic and later with autism. In 2025, Heap came out as pansexual.

== Discography ==
Studio albums

- I Megaphone (1998)
- Speak for Yourself (2005)
- Ellipse (2009)
- Sparks (2014)

== Awards and nominations ==
Organization	Year	Category	Nominated work	Result	Ref.
AIM Independent Music Awards	2015	Special Catalogue Release of the Year	Sparks (Deluxe Boxset)	Nominated	
Drama Desk Award	2018	Outstanding Music in a Play	Harry Potter and the Cursed Child	Won	
Grammy Awards	2007	Best New Artist	Herself	Nominated	
Grammy Awards	2007	Best Song Written for Visual Media	"Can't Take It In"	Nominated	
Grammy Awards	2010	Best Pop Instrumental Performance	"The Fire"	Nominated	
Grammy Awards	2010	Best Engineered Album, Non-Classical	Ellipse	Won	
Grammy Awards	2016	Album of the Year	1989 (as producer and engineer)	Won	
Grammy Awards	2020	Best Musical Theatre Album	The Music of Harry Potter and the Cursed Child In Four Contemporary Suites	Nominated	
Ivor Novello Awards	2010	International Achievement	Herself	Won	
Laurence Olivier Awards	2017	Outstanding Achievement in Music	Harry Potter and the Cursed Child	Nominated	
MTVU Woodie Awards	2006	Best Emerging Artist	Herself	Nominated	
MTVU Woodie Awards	2006	Most Original Artist	Herself	Nominated	
MTVU Woodie Awards	2006	Most Downloaded	"Hide and Seek"	Nominated	
Music Producers Guild Awards	2018	Inspiration Award	Herself	Won	
Music Week Awards	2015	Inspirational Artist	Herself	Won	
World Soundtrack Awards	2006	Best Original Song Written Directly for a Film	"Can't Take It In"	Nominated	
