= Levi Weaver =

American singer

- Born: Colorado, U.S.
- Origin: Dallas, Texas, U.S.
- Genres: Folk rock, acoustic, country
- Instruments: Acoustic guitar, electric guitar
- Years active: 2006–2016
- Website: leviweaver.com

Levi Weaver is an American independent musician, singer, songwriter, performer, and sportswriter. He was born in Colorado, raised in Fort Worth, Texas, and now resides in Dallas. Though Levi is an independent musician, he is perhaps best known for his collaborations with artists such as Jenny & Tyler, Imogen Heap and Kid Beyond. Levi's music style can be described as alternative rock or acoustic, though it varies from track to track and album to album. On tour, Levi collaborates with guest artists at times, but typically performs his own works solo. In order to replicate a complex, multi-layered sound from studio sessions, he makes extensive use of a loop pedal during some of his live performances.

== Personal history ==
Born in Colorado and raised in Texas, Weaver moved to Birmingham, England in 2005 after his former band broke up. He then released his first EP, the self-recorded "Civil War Between My Heart and Mind," in April 2006. During the fall of that year, Weaver toured with Kid Beyond, in support of Imogen Heap. Due to the extended absence from his previous employment in England while touring, Weaver lost his British visa and in February 2007 moved back to the United States. He spent several years in the Nashville, Tennessee area, and now resides in Dallas, Texas. Weaver's first full-length album, "You Are Never Close To Home, You Are Never Far From Home" was made available at a CD show in Fort Worth, Texas at the Ridglea Theater later that year.

In 2008, Weaver toured the U.S. extensively, and also began work on his second full-length studio album. In 2009, he took down his website and shared his demos exclusively through the forum (which remained online). At the end of that summer, Weaver began working with Mitch Dane to record the songs that would make up the album, and continued to tour between studio sessions. The last tour of 2009 was with Norwegian singer Kate Havnevik, after which he settled back into the studio with new producer Aaron Dethrage to finish the album which would eventually be titled "The Letters of Dr. Kurt Gödel". In March 2011, after two years of work, this album was released on Weaver's Bandcamp page.

Levi's tours of the United States typically involved him traveling solo. However, he announced through his website that a tour in 2013 and 2014 was going to be with his family, who had recently sold many of their possessions, ended their apartment lease, and moved into a recreational vehicle for the duration of the tour.

There are times where Levi has been accompanied by other musicians during his performances. He has performed in several states with the duo Jenny & Tyler, and is described by their website as contributing to a recent album, "For Freedom".

Since 2018 he has been a baseball writer for The Athletic.

== "Independent Spirit" ==
Levi has often stated that he prefers the ideals of Independent Music, and has frequently made known his relative disdain for the current state of the Music Industry. In May 2008, using clips he shot whilst on tour, he released a video to YouTube titled "What This Looks Like...". In it, Weaver is quoted as saying "I don't really feel like I'm part of this dying old machine they call 'The Industry'. Everyone I know that loves music doesn't even listen to the radio anymore, so how is that even a music industry?... That old dinosaur of A&R agents and slick dealings and development deals; they took the name 'music industry' back when it applied, but now that it no longer does, they're not going to give it back... we have to come up with a new name for what it even means to make music anymore..."

In summer 2008, Levi posted an open letter to the RIAA in his blog. This incendiary letter spoke angrily of the possibility that Pandora.com would soon be shutting down due to measures taken by the RIAA and SoundExchange.

== Notable songs ==
Weaver wrote "Del Cielo" to cope with a family tragedy: at 17, Levi and his 13-year-old brother were involved in a car accident, in which Levi's brother was killed while Levi suffered only minimal injuries. This song was recorded on his first album, "Civil War Between My Heart and Mind".

In 2011, Gary Nock re-recorded Weaver's "Make it Better" and the song was used for a Mars Chocolate ad in the United Kingdom.

== Discography ==
Civil War Between My Heart and Mind (2006) (This EP has since been licensed to Respect Music, a publishing company in England)

1. "Good Medicine"
2. "Dead Best Friends"
3. "Kid, Way to Go"
4. "Road Map Eyes"
5. "Am I Trying?"
6. "Del Cielo"

Of Bridges Burned single (2007)

1. "Of Bridges Burned"
2. "Would We Liars Be?"
3. "Family Feud (Doc Holliday Mix)"

You Are Never Close to Home, You Are Never Far from Home (2007)

1. "Dear Friend"
2. "Of Bridges Burned"
3. "Family Feud"
4. "You Are Home"
5. "Sick, Or Determined?"
6. "Which Drink?"
7. "Idioteque"
8. "Would We Liars Be?"
9. "Kansas, I Decline (Stars)"
10. "Last Camden Stand"
11. "An Epistle For Sal"
12. "Let's Talk Dissent"

All of My Best Friends Are Mostly Strangers [EP] (2008) – sent through mailing list

1. "Have You Seen Me Lately" Counting Crows cover
2. "Used To Love U" John Legend cover
3. "Longtime Sunshine" Weezer cover
4. "The Zookeeper's Boy" Mew cover
5. "Left and Leaving" The Weakerthans cover

Live at The Prophet Bar (2010)

1. "Sick, or Determined?"
2. "Good Medicine"
3. "Of Bridges Burned"
4. "Dear Friend"
5. "Dead Best Friends"
6. "Kansas, I Decline (Stars)"
7. "You Are Home"
8. "Last Camden Stand"
9. "Road Map Eyes"
10. "Family Feud"
11. "Which Drink?"
12. "Del Cielo"

The Letters of Dr. Kurt Gödel (2011)

1. "String Theory"
2. "(the butterfly)"
3. "Goodbye, Vivian"
4. "We're Tornadoes When We Dance"
5. "Drink (Drink, Drink)"
6. "(the beast)"
7. "The Best Defense (is to be offensive)"
8. "I Am Certain I Am a Train"
9. "Spirit First (Sincerely, K.)"
10. "(the bird)"
11. "A Bad Example, A Helping Hand"
12. "Apostate"
13. "Good From Evil"
14. "(the end)"
15. "An Incompleteness Theorem"

Twenty Thousand Miles (2012)

1. "Good from Evil" Tuscaloosa, AL
2. "Family Feud" Anniston, AL
3. "Spirit First" Charlotte, NC
4. "Good Medicine" Virginia Beach, VA
5. "Del Cielo" Paeonian Springs, VA
6. "I Am Certain I Am a Train" Lynchburg, VA
7. "Of Bridges Burned" Raleigh, NC
8. "You Are Home" Baltimore, MD
9. "Which Drink" Ardmore, PA
10. "Sick, or Determined" Clinton, CT
11. "String Theory" Aurora, NY
12. "Dead Best Friends" Mississauga, ON
13. "Kansas, I Decline" Toronto, ON
14. "We're Tornadoes When We Dance" Ypsilanti, MI
15. "Road Map Eyes" Columbus, OH

I Am Only a Tiny Noise (2012)

1. "Never Want You Back"
2. "Bright"
3. "Rogue Boat"
4. "Talk Me Down"
5. "Dark Clay"

Your Ghost Keeps Finding Me (2014)

1. "Borrowed Clothes"
2. "Song in My Branches"
3. "Sing Me Red"
4. "Citadel"
5. "Upper Middle Class"
6. "Pieces"
7. "Paddleboats"
8. "Hear You Say My Name"
9. "(I'm Glad) Your Ghost Keeps Finding Me"
10. "We Married Strangers"
11. "All Our Days"
12. "The Widow's Song/The Widower's Song"

== String Theory documentary ==
In 2012 it was announced that a documentary about Levi, String Theory, was in production. The project was officially announced on May 2, with a teaser trailer and IndieGoGo Campaign being launched on May 8.

According to the String Theory website, "STRING THEORY covers a moment in the life of musician Levi Weaver. Following a six-year span of his career, from touring with Imogen Heap to playing intimate house shows around the world and every kind of venue in between, the film features personal interviews, a multitude of concert footage, and uncommon access to Levi's personal road footage.

String Theory is a feature documentary with a first-hand look at the constant tension between art and commerce, Levi Weaver's ever-evolving and inspiring creative process, and the distances he has driven to measure the road between fame and true success."

== Civic concerns ==
In 2010, just as the album "You are never close to home" was nearing completion, Weaver discovered that the Ridglea Theater in Fort Worth was under contract to Bank of America, to be mostly demolished for commercial uses. From June through November of that year, Weaver put his music career on hold and began the fight to save the venerable theater. After creating a business plan, securing investors, and making appearances at a number of neighborhood association groups, Weaver found himself speaking in front of the Fort Worth City Council. Weeks later, Bank of America announced that they no longer planned to purchase the theater, and withdrew from the process. While Weaver's investment group did not win the bid for the building, the theater was purchased by a group which renovated the theater, preserved most of the façade, and has re-opened it as an entertainment venue.

== Goodbye / Aposiopesis ==
On February 15, 2016, Levi sent an update to his mailing list titled "Goodbye / Aposiopesis". He stated that music would no longer be his occupation. He had accepted a job at television station WFAA in Dallas, Texas as a full-time Texas Rangers beat reporter, covering the team on an everyday basis. The email expressed immense thanks and concluded with the statement "With all my heart, and half my life – thank you." Subsequently, Weaver released a collection of 22 unfinished songs and demos as Aposiopesis.
