= Vokle =

Former American live streaming service

- Company type: Corporation
- Founded: June 2008
- Headquarters: Santa Monica, California, United States
- Area served: Worldwide
- Creators: Robert Kiraz, Edward Dekeratry
- Website: www.vokle.com
- Registration: Optional
- Current status: Inactive

Vokle was an embeddable Internet microsite application that allowed speakers to broadcast live video to a virtual auditorium of viewers and take live video calls and text questions from the audience.

== History ==
VOKLE privately launched a prototype in March 2009, and PC Magazine noted that VOKLE was a "web-based platform for video conversations" that seemed to be "adding voice to social networking." VOKLE refined its alpha version and launched a stable version to the public on December 11, 2009. The beta version of VOKLE allowed for remote co-hosts, screening of video calls and live video editing, and was aimed "to help you take social to the next step by providing you with your own customized, branded video chat platform." The application was web-based, could be embedded on external websites, and did not require plug-ins or downloads.

In July 2011, VOKLE launched a unique recording feature that automatically divides video and text questions into specific chapters, which can be browsed and selected before the viewer plays the recording. These chapters can be shared easily on Twitter or Facebook through buttons, and can also be embedded on external websites.

In March 2013, staff pick Binyamin Goldman posted an article on the tech blog The Verge directed toward the VOKLE staff. The article explained that people have been unable to broadcast on the site since November, and that the VOKLE team has not responded to his personal emails, tweeted, or put something on Facebook in the past 4 months. The site was no longer fully functional in November 2013, and continues to be inaccessible as of 2025.

== Financing ==
After their initial seed round in 2008, VOKLE began raising Angel funds. In April 2010, Co-founder Edward Dekeratry confirmed that VOKLE had secured a small round that allowed the company to pay for basic engineering. In August 2010, Tech Coast Angels, Southern California's largest angel investment group, confirmed they had invested in Vokle. Angel funding continued until April 2011, when VOKLE closed its angel round with an extra $767,000 from investors including Imogen Heap, Rafe Furst and Tech Coast Angels, "bringing Vokle’s total funding to $1.26 million."
