= Project Digits =

Microsoft Research project

Microsoft Digits
- Also known as: Digits
- Developer: Microsoft
- Type: Gesture recognition, Natural user interface
- Released: Prototype displayed 9 October 2012
- Input: Infrared Camera Sensor, IR laser line generator, IR diffuse illuminator, inertial-measurement unit (IMU)
- Website: research.microsoft.com/en-us/projects/digits/

Project Digits is a Microsoft Research Project under Microsoft's computer science laboratory at the University of Cambridge; researchers from Newcastle University and University of Crete are also involved in this project. Project is led by David Kim, a Microsoft Research PhD and also a PhD student in computer science at Newcastle University. Digits is an input device which can be mounted on the wrist of human hand and it captures and displays a complete 3D graphical representation of the user's hand on screen without using any external sensing device or hand covering material like data gloves. This project aims to make gesture-controlled interfaces completely hands free with greater mobility and accuracy. It allows user to interact with whatever hardware while moving from room to room or walking down the street without any line of sight connection with the hardware.

== Prototype ==
Prototype of the device was displayed at a conference on user interface technology in Massachusetts on 9 October 2012. System is created using off the shelf hardware and consumes low power. The Device uses Infrared-Camera sensor which detects infrared light and then the data is fed to the software which interprets it to create a 3D model of the human hand. Data changes according to the position of real hand and then so does the 3D representation also. The Infrared laser beam is used to determine the distance to fingers and thumbs to obtain the accurate orientation of the hands. Further, Infrared LED’s helps to determine the exact position of the fingertips, as the light bounced back from fingers is captured by the camera. One of the benefits of IR LED is that human eye cannot detect it, hence it does not disturbs the user while using the device. "Ultimately we would like to reduce Digits to the size of a watch that can be worn all the time, We want users to be able to interact spontaneously with their electronic devices using simple gestures and not even have to reach for their devices." Quoted by David Kim Project Leader.

== Usability ==
Digits can be used to control various devices.

1. User can control mobile phone interface without line of sight interaction. For example, user can twist an imaginary dial to control the frequency of radio and slide an imaginary slider to control the volume of music being played. User can also tap on an imaginary keypad to dial a number without taking out mobile from their pocket.
2. Using digits, user can play video games without using a controller. For example, user can use hand gestures to pick up objects in game, mimic a virtual gun from their hand and press the barrel etc. This type of gaming interaction has not been achieved yet.
3. Three Dimensional gesture controls can be used to control tablets and computers, 3D representation of hand can be used to navigate around in operating systems instead of a mouse, user can tap onto virtual keyboard to type, a pinching action can be used to zoom into image or documents etc.
4. Microsoft might also pair this device with Xbox Kinect, to achieve greater level of interaction with gaming consoles.

Microsoft Demonstrated usability of digits in a video.

== Reception ==
Features of Digits look promising, but some gesture tech researchers believe that people would prefer sensing technology embedded into the device, instead of wearing it on the wrist.

Dr Richard Picking, reader in human-computer interaction at Glyndwr University quoted to BBC that "This portable, mobile solution is an interesting development with potential for novel applications." There have been attempts at gesture sensing technology like data gloves, which failed to make an impact and were only limited to video game industry, and there is a chance that Digits might end up like that. Also, there is not enough evidence that how accurate and reliable the technology in the device is, especially the camera, if the camera is displaced slightly then does the device still work effectively? Comfort-ability of the device is also not known.

However, Microsoft team is aware of all the pros and cons of the device and believe that significant modification needs to be made before releasing the product in the market.

== See also ==
- Gesture recognition
- Natural user interface
