= Mi.Mu Gloves =

Musical instrument

Electronic
- Classification: Wearable
- Inventor: Imogen Heap
- Developed: 2010

Musicians
- Imogen Heap

Mi.Mu Gloves are a wearable musical instrument designed to enable musicians to control sound and music through hand and finger gestures. The gloves were developed by British musician Imogen Heap and her team, aiming to create an innovative way of interacting with music technology during live performances and music composition.

== Development and technology ==
The concept for Mi.Mu Gloves was conceived in 2010 when Imogen Heap sought a way to break free from traditional instruments and use her body as an interface for controlling sound. Heap collaborated with engineers, developers, and designers to create the gloves, with the goal of enhancing live performances and making music production more intuitive.

The gloves are equipped with a range of sensors that detect hand movements, finger gestures, and arm positions. These movements are translated into MIDI signals, which can control a variety of sound parameters in real-time. The system is designed to be wireless, transmitting the signals via Wi-Fi to music software such as Ableton Live, Logic Pro, or custom-built programs.

== Reception ==
The Mi.Mu Gloves have been positively received for their innovative approach to musical performance. They have garnered attention for their ability to make music production more intuitive and accessible, particularly in live performances where the gloves allow for a new type of expressiveness. Imogen Heap has demonstrated the gloves in various live settings, showcasing their potential to transform traditional performance methods.

== See also ==
- MIDI controller
- Imogen Heap
