= Ridglea Theatre =

- U.S. National Register of Historic Places
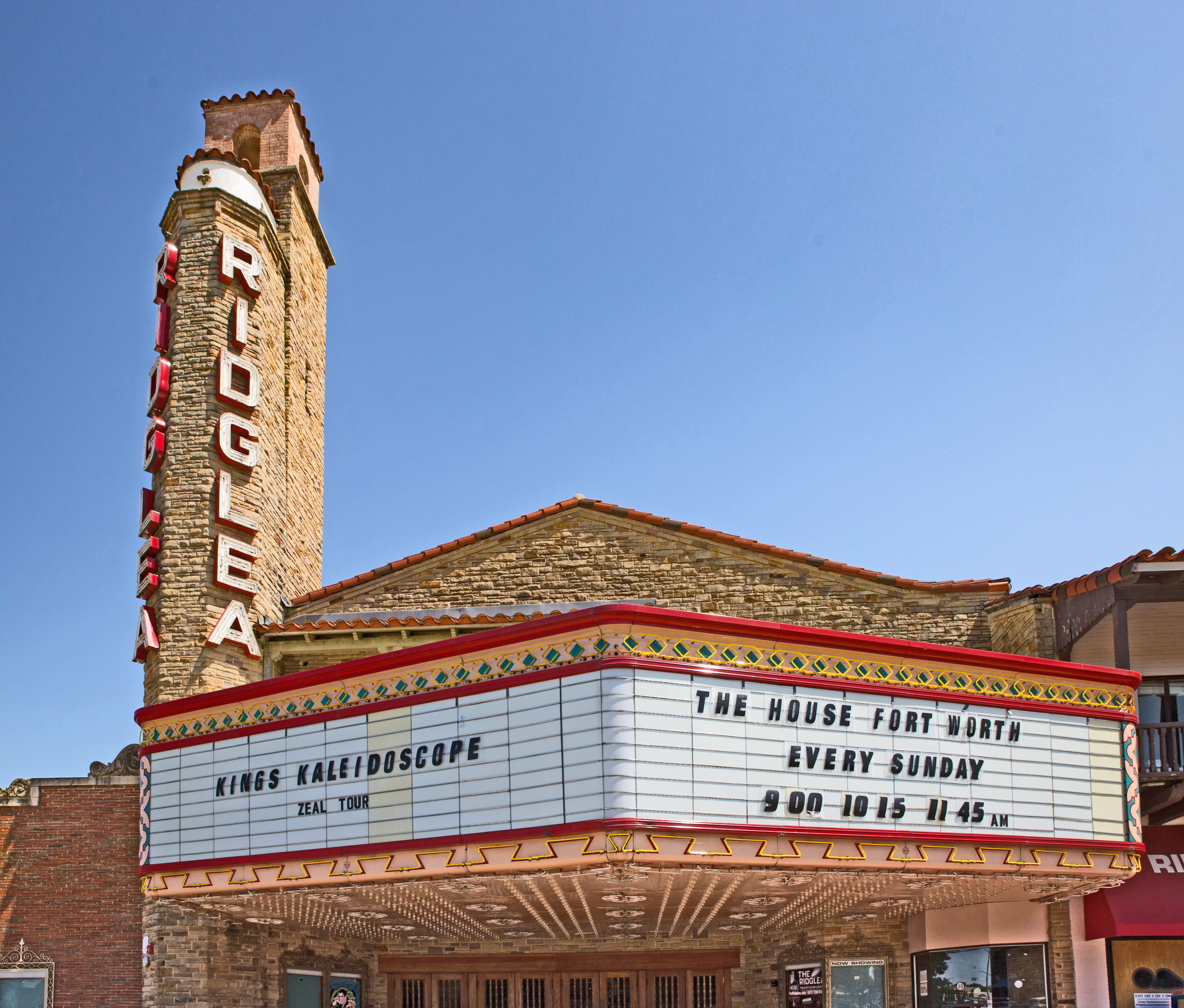
- Ridglea Theater in 2019

- Location within Texas Location within the United States
- Location: 6025-6033 Camp Bowie Blvd. & 3309 Winthrop Ave., Fort Worth, Texas
- Coordinates: 32°42′17″N 97°32′34″W
- Area: 3 acres (1.2 ha)
- Built by: Loffland and Luther
- Architect: Pettigrew and Worley
- Artist: Eugene J. Gilboe
- Architectural style: Mission/Spanish Revival
- Website: The Ridglea
- NRHP reference No.: 11000982
- Added to NRHP: December 30, 2011

The Ridglea Theater is a single-screen theater located in Fort Worth, Texas, USA, which opened in December 1950. Its primary owner was the Interstate theater chain, and the first movie shown was Pretty Baby. The theater is well known for its Mission/Spanish Revival facade and 70-foot stone tower. In 1990, a Dallas-based investment company acquired the theater for 1.85 million dollars, and the Maulsby trust purchased the building in 1991. The theater is currently going through a multimillion-dollar renovation.

It was added to the National Register of Historic Places on December 30, 2011.

== Photo gallery ==
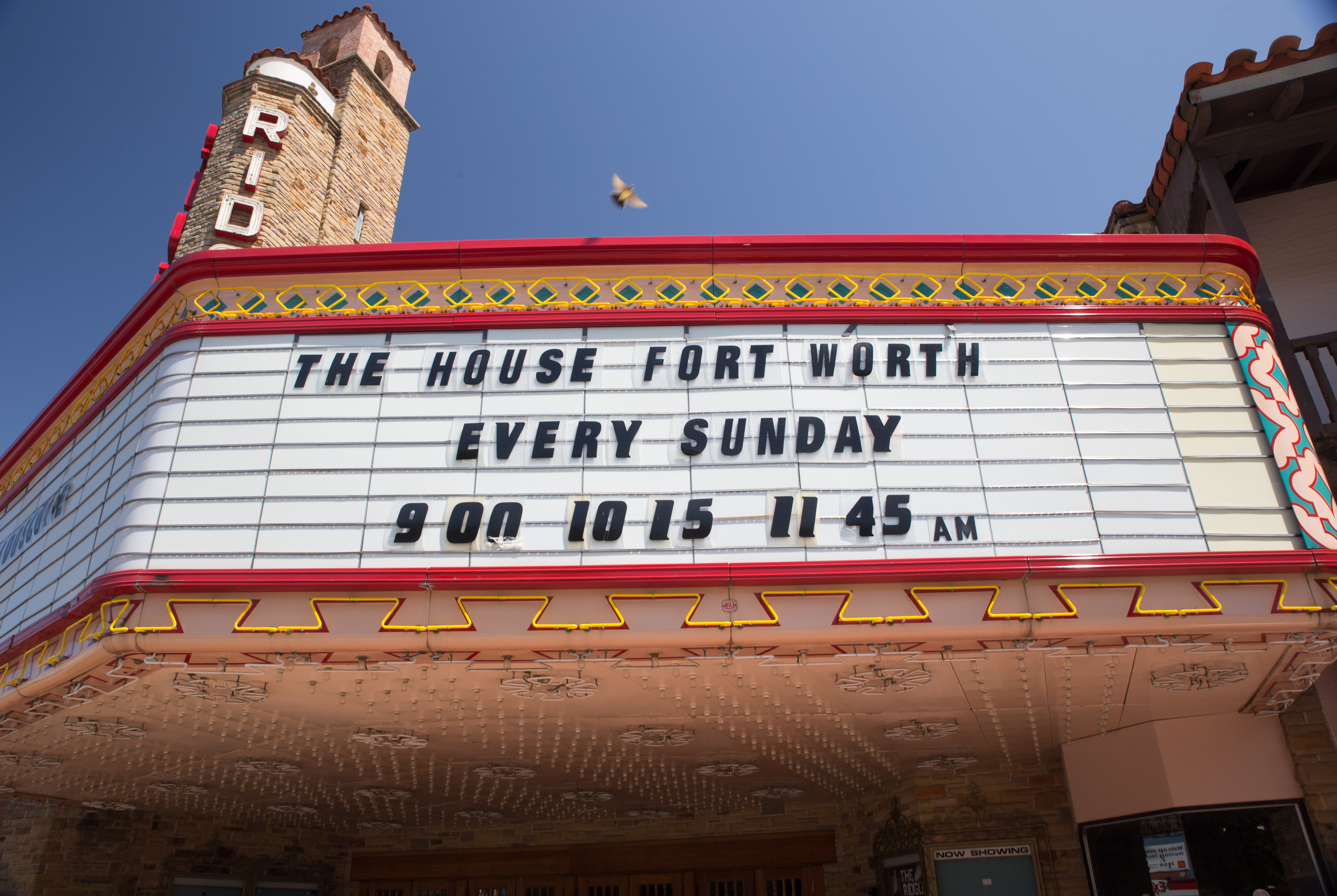

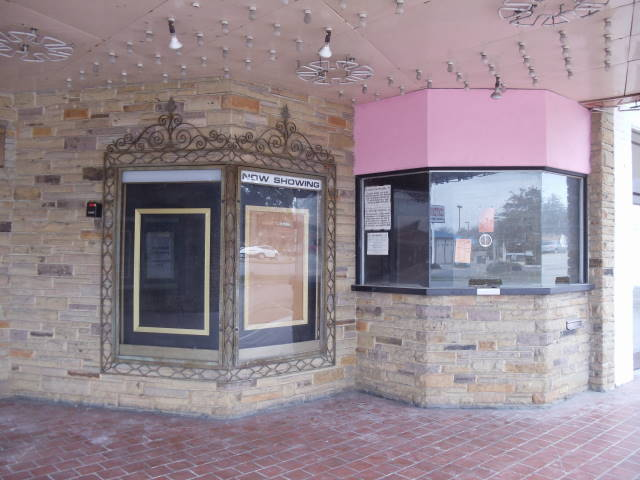

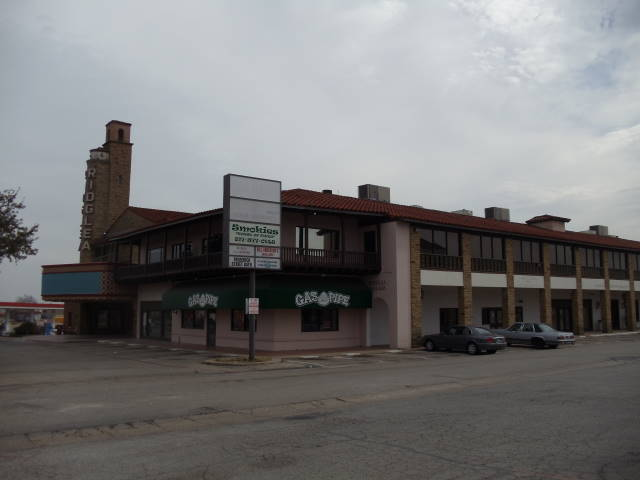

== See also ==
- National Register of Historic Places listings in Tarrant County, Texas
