= Wired glove =

Input device for human–computer interaction

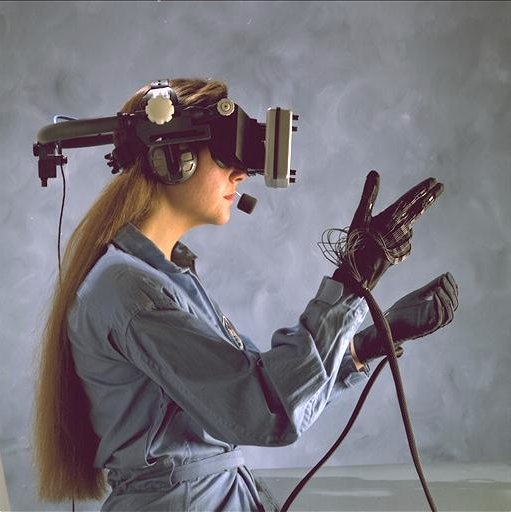
A woman using a head-mounted display and wired gloves

A wired glove (also called a dataglove or cyberglove) is an input device for human–computer interaction worn like a glove.

Various sensor technologies are used to capture physical data such as bending of fingers. Often a motion tracker, such as a magnetic tracking device or inertial tracking device, is attached to capture the global position/rotation data of the glove. These movements are then interpreted by the software that accompanies the glove, so any one movement can mean any number of things. Gestures can then be categorized into useful information, such as to recognize sign language or other symbolic functions.

Expensive high-end wired gloves can also provide haptic feedback, which is a simulation of the sense of touch. This allows a wired glove to also be used as an output device. Traditionally, wired gloves have only been available at a huge cost, with the finger bend sensors and the tracking device having to be bought separately.

Wired gloves are often used in virtual reality environments and to mimic human hand movement by robots.

== History ==
The Sayre Glove, created by Electronic Visualization Laboratory in 1977, was the first wired glove.

In 1982 Thomas G. Zimmerman filed a patent (US Patent 4542291) on an optical flex sensor mounted in a glove to measure finger bending. Zimmerman worked with Jaron Lanier to incorporate ultrasonic and magnetic hand position tracking technology to create the Power Glove and Data Glove, respectively (US Patent 4988981, filed 1989). The optical flex sensor used in the Data Glove was invented by Young L. Harvill who scratched the fiber near the finger joint to make it locally sensitive to bending.

One of the first wired gloves available to home users in 1987 was the Nintendo Power Glove. This was designed as a gaming glove for the Nintendo Entertainment System. It had a crude tracker and finger bend sensors, plus buttons on the back. The resistive sensors in the PowerGlove were also used by hobbyists to create their own datagloves.

This was followed by the CyberGlove, created by Virtual Technologies, Inc. in 1990. Virtual Technologies was acquired by Immersion Corporation in September 2000. In 2009, the CyberGlove line of products was divested by Immersion Corporation and a new company, CyberGlove Systems LLC, took over development, manufacturing and sales of the CyberGlove.

In addition to the CyberGlove, Immersion Corp also developed three other data glove products: the CyberTouch, which vibrates each individual finger of the glove when a finger touches an object in virtual reality; the CyberGrasp which actually simulates squeezing and touching of solid as well as spongy objects; and the CyberForce device which does all of the above and also measures the precise motion of the user's entire arm.

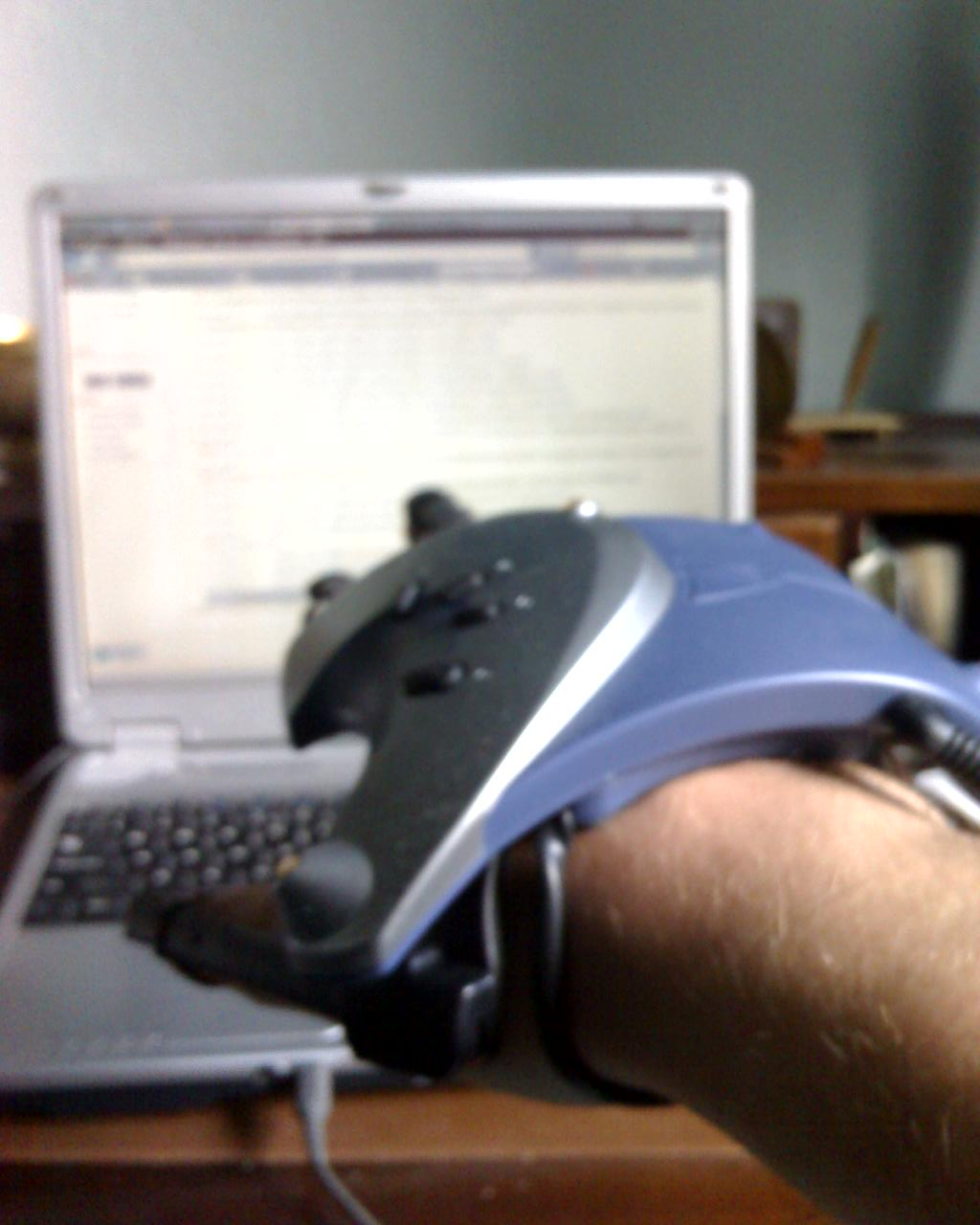
A P5 wired glove being used as a mouse

In 2002, the P5 Glove was released by Essential Reality (hardware designed by Johathan Clarke and Leigh Boyd). In normal applications, it worked as a two-dimensional mouse and a few computer games were specially adapted to provide "3D" support for it. The P5 glove is compatible with Microsoft Windows XP and the classic Mac OS. Unofficial drivers for Linux exist as well. While it received some positive reviews from gadget and gaming magazines, its lack of compatible software and other issues caused it to remain a novelty. It has since been discontinued.

Following the P5 Glove was the 5th Glove, a data glove and flexor strip kit (5th Glove DFK) sold by Fifth Dimension Technologies. The package uses flexible optical-bending sensing to track hand and arm movement. The glove can be used with 5DT's ultrasonic tracking system, the 5DT Head and 5DT Hand tracker, which can track movement from up to two metres away from the unit's transmitter.

Concerned about the high cost of the most complete commercial solutions, Pamplona et al. propose a new input device: an image-based data glove (IBDG). By attaching a camera to the hand of the user and a visual marker to each finger tip, they use computer vision techniques to estimate the relative position of the finger tips. Once they have information about the tips, they apply inverse kinematics techniques in order to estimate the position of each finger joint and recreate the movements of the fingers of the user in a virtual world. Adding a motion tracker device, one can also map pitch, yaw, roll and XYZ-translations of the hand of the user, (almost) recreating all the gesture and posture performed by the hand of the user in a low cost device.

A modern alternative to inertial, optical and magnetic technology is the use of stretch sensors. New Zealand company StretchSense has developed the first stretch sensor enabled motion capture glove called the MoCap Pro. Stretch sensors are silicone-based flexible capacitors that measure stretch, bend, shear and pressure changes. The data can then be streamed into software platforms such as Unreal Engine, Unity and Maya to animate the hand of a virtual character.

== Alternatives ==
An alternative to wired gloves is to use a camera and computer vision to track the 3D pose and trajectory of the hand, at the cost of tactile feedback.

== Popular culture ==
- The film adaptation of Minority Report makes use of wireless gloves to control futuristic computer-like peripherals.
- The Mattel Power Glove was prominently shown off in the Nintendo product placement film The Wizard, memorably wielded by antagonist Lucas Barton (Jackey Vinson).
- A pair of "Sogo-7 data gloves" are used in concert with other tech gadgets to access the internet in the film Johnny Mnemonic.

== Academic and research projects ==
The concept of a wired glove has been traditionally popular in the research and engineering community. Engineers continue to develop prototypes that use innovative sensor technologies and architectures to achieve the goal of gesture recognition. For example, one such project is the Smart Glove, developed in 2009 by the then electronics engineering students Arvind Ramana, Subramanian KS, Suresh and Shiva. This project was an innovative design making interesting use of hall effect switches and custom home made bend sensors.

One major barrier to adoption of datagloves is sweat.

== See also ==
- Gesture recognition – Topic in computer science and language technology
- Hand-over – Hand motion capture in animation
- Motion capture – Process of recording the movement of objects or people
- Open-source robotics – Open-source branch of robotics
- Project Digits – Microsoft Research project
- Robotic arm – Type of mechanical arm with similar functions to a human arm
