= Nori (company) =

Seattle based technology startup

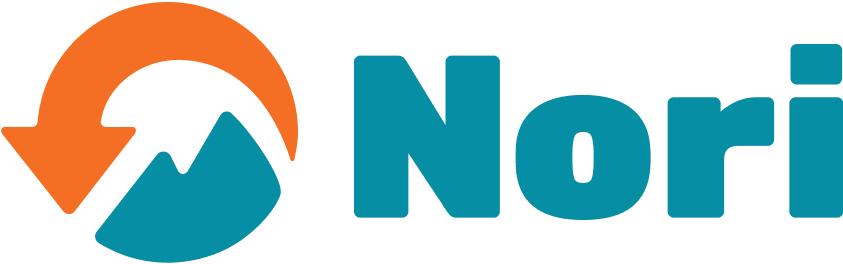
Nori logo

Nori Inc. was a technology company based in Seattle, Washington, that closed in 2024. The company's main business was a carbon marketplace which focused on soil-carbon sequestration. Nori paid farmers who adopted regenerative agriculture practices which may contribute to carbon sequestration.

== History and funding ==
Nori was founded in 2017 by Paul Gambill.

In 2018, Nori raised $145,548 on Republic's crowdfunding platform when its CEO, Gambill pitched Nori on an episode of Meet the Drapers, starring venture capitalist Tim Draper and his family.

In 2020, Nori raised $4 million from several investors.

In February 2022 Nori raised $7 million in a Series A round led by M13 and Toyota Ventures.

In April 2023, Nori laid off 10 employees due to "changing market conditions." Several months later, the company hired Matt Trudeau as its new CEO and raised an additional $6.25 million in funding. Gambill then transitioned to the title of Chief Product Officer and ended his tenure with the company in March 2024, although staying as a member of its board.

== Products and services ==
Nori created a platform where carbon removal suppliers could get paid by carbon removal buyers. Nori specifically focused on the growth of financial incentives and the supply of carbon removal offsets, not reduction or avoidance offsets.

Nori sold the Regenerative Tonne™ (formerly "Nori Carbon Removal Tonnes" or "NRTs") on its trading platform to represent one tonne of carbon dioxide (CO_{2}) that has been removed from the atmosphere into for a minimum of 10 years. Nori's RTs were generated from agricultural projects that could store carbon dioxide in soil as of April 2021. These soil projects are broadly called regenerative agriculture practices. Nori was developing a financial instrument to assist growers in enhancing carbon dioxide sequestration in their soils, with potential benefits including climate change mitigation, drought tolerance, reduced surface runoff pollution, and improved soil health.

In December 2023, Nori launched the Net Zero Tonne™, a blended credit that mixes soil carbon sequestration with durable removal like direct air capture.

== Early adopters ==
In early 2020, Maryland farmer Trey Hill became the first seller in Nori's marketplace. He was paid over $115,000 for practices that, over the preceding few years, had sequestered over 8,000 tons of carbon in the soil. Buyers included Shopify Inc., Arizona State University, and individuals looking to remove carbon.

In November 2020, Iowa farmer Kelly Garrett sold 5,000 carbon removals through Nori's carbon removal marketplace platform and Locus Agricultural Solutions. The buyer of the carbon credits was Shopify Inc, who used the carbon removal credits to help negate emissions from transporting goods sold on the Black Friday/Cyber Monday weekend.
