= Flex sensor =

Sensor that measures the amount of deflection or bending

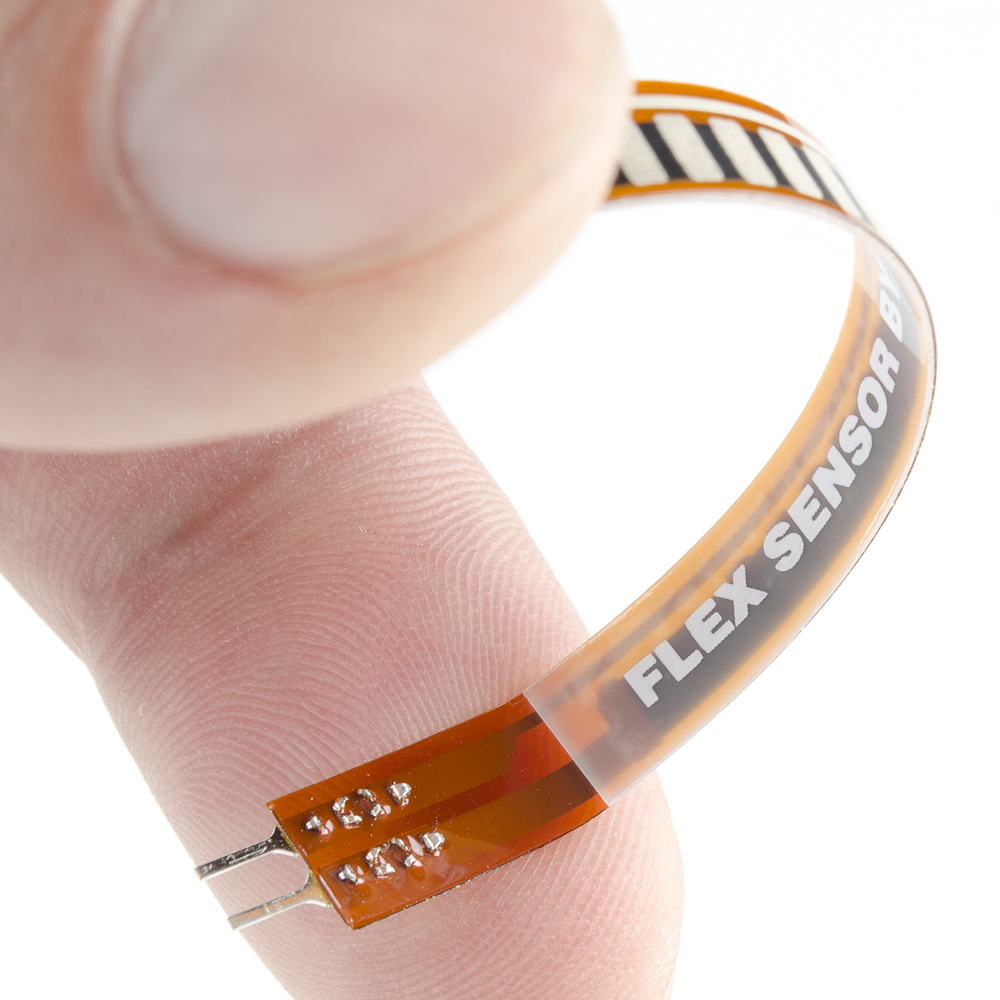
A conductive ink based flex sensor

A flex sensor or bend sensor is a sensor that measures the amount of deflection or bending. Usually, the sensor is stuck to the surface, and resistance of sensor element is varied by bending the surface. Since the resistance is directly proportional to the amount of bend it is used as goniometer, and often called flexible potentiometer.

== Types of flex sensor ==
- Conductive ink based flex sensor
- Fibre optic flex sensor
- Capacitive flex sensor
- Velostat flex sensor (popular among hobbyists)

== Applications ==
Flex sensors are used in wide areas of research from computer interfaces, rehabilitation, security systems and even music interfaces. It is also famous among students and hobbyists.

=== Human Machine Interface devices ===
A dataglove is a human-computer interaction device that is made possible by flex sensors. Deflections of a dataglove are measured via its flex sensors embedded in the glove.

=== Rehabilitation Research ===
In rehabilitation research, wired gloves or datagloves are used to record joint movement.

=== Security Systems ===
Movement of doors is monitored by placing the sensor at the hinge. Also, damage to metal structures can be identified using the sensor.

== See also ==
Strain gauge
