= Imogen Heap discography =

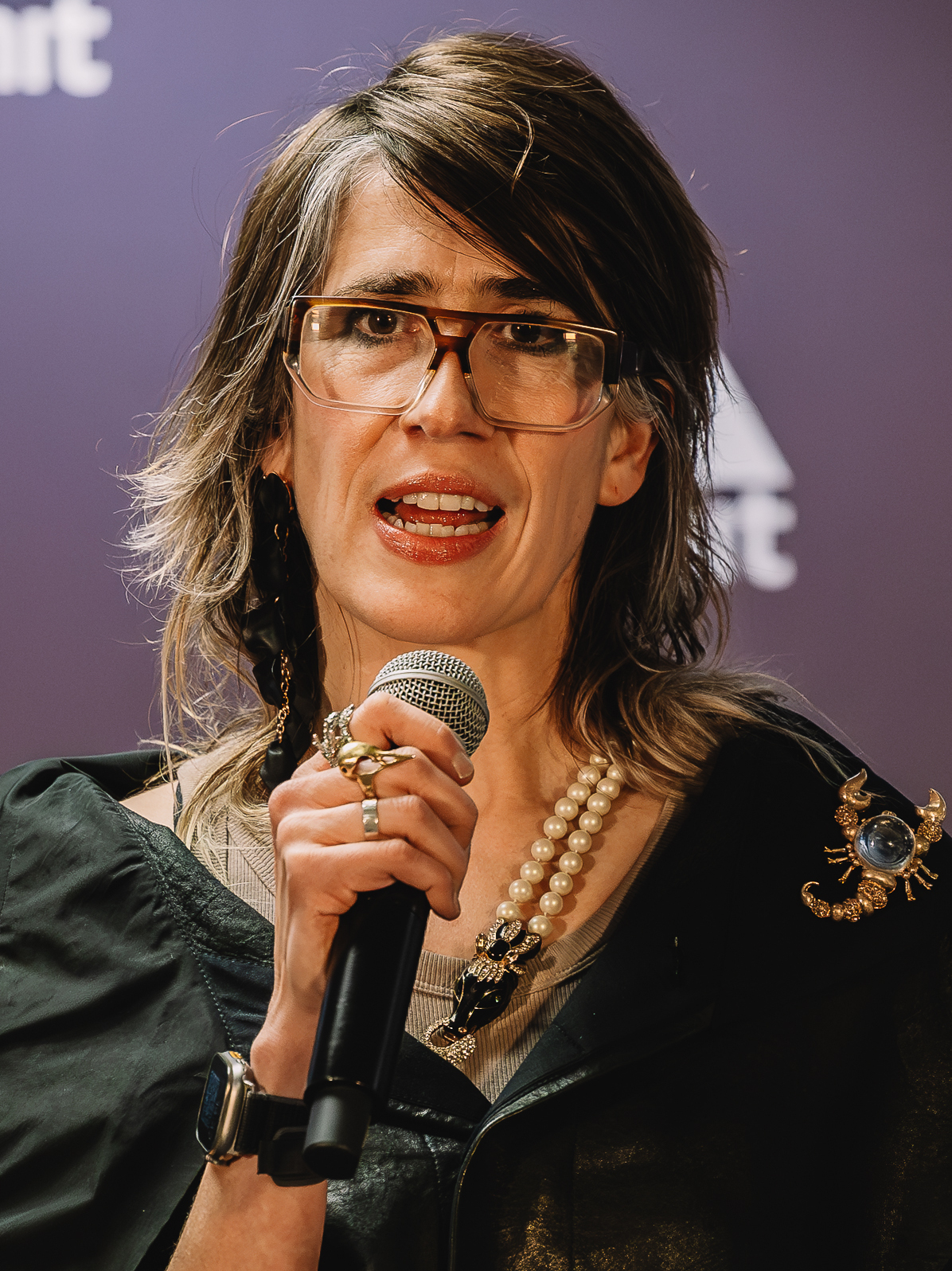
- Imogen Heap in 2024
- Studio albums: 4
- Extended plays: 3
- Soundtrack albums: 2
- Compilation albums: 1
- Singles: 33
- Music videos: 12
- Promotional singles: 8

The discography of Imogen Heap consists of four studio albums, three extended plays, one compilation album, two soundtrack albums, 33 singles (including six as a featured artist), eight promotional singles, and twelve music videos.

Heap's debut studio album, I Megaphone, was released in 1998. Heap formed the electronic duo Frou Frou with Guy Sigsworth and released their only album Details in 2002. In 2005, Heap released her second studio album, Speak for Yourself. One of the album's singles, "Hide and Seek", went on to be certified Gold by the RIAA. In 2009, Heap released her third studio album, Ellipse, which went on to reach number one on Billboard's Dance/Electronic Albums. In 2011, Heap began work on her fourth album, Sparks, which was released on August 18, 2014, and became her second number-one album on Billboard's Dance/Electronic Albums chart.

== Albums ==
=== Studio albums ===
Title	Details	Peak chart positions								Certifications
Title	Details	UK	UK Indie	CAN	SCO	US	US Dance	US Rock	US Alt	Certifications
I Megaphone	Release date: 16 June 1998; Label: Almo Sounds, Aozora; Formats: CD, cassette, digital download	—	—	—	—	—	—	—	—	
Speak for Yourself	Release date: 18 July 2005; Label: Megaphonic, White Rabbit; Formats: CD, digital download	— (Note: Speak for Yourself did not enter the UK Albums Chart, but peaked at number 71 on the UK Album Downloads Chart.)	—	—	—	145	2	—	—	MC: Gold; RIAA: Platinum
Ellipse	Release date: 24 August 2009; Label: Megaphonic; Formats: CD, digital download	39	—	4	64	5	1	4	3	
Sparks	Release date: 18 August 2014; Label: Megaphonic; Formats: CD, vinyl, digital download	40	7	—	58	21	1	—	—	
"—" denotes a recording that did not chart or was not released in that territory.

=== Compilation albums ===
Title	Details
Icon (with Frou Frou)	Release date: 4 January 2011; Label: Hip-O; Format: CD

=== Soundtrack albums ===
Title	Details	Peak chart positions				
Title	Details	UK	SCO	US Sales	US Cast	US Classical
The Music of Harry Potter and the Cursed Child – in Four Contemporary Suites	Release date: 2 November 2018; Label: Megaphonic, West End; Formats: CD, LP, digital download	93	75	75	2	2
Chordata Bytes I (with Dan O'Neill)	Release date: 7 November 2022; Label: Megaphonic; Format: digital download	—	—	—	—	—
Chordata Bytes II (with Dan O'Neill)	Release date: 29 November 2022; Label: Megaphonic; Format: digital download	—	—	—	—	—
"—" denotes a recording that did not chart or was not released in that territory.

== Extended plays ==
Title	Details
Live Session EP (iTunes Exclusive)	Release date: 8 August 2006; Label: Megaphonic; Format: digital download
iTunes Festival: London '07	Release date: 11 December 2009; Label: Megaphonic; Format: digital download
Live Charity Improvisations: North American Tour 2010	Release date: 29 October 2010; Label: Megaphonic; Format: digital download
I Am ___	Release date: 24 October 2025; Label: Megaphonic; Format: digital download

== Singles ==
=== As lead artist ===
Title	Year	Peak chart positions									Certifications	Album
Title	Year	UK	UK Indie	CAN	IRE	LTU	NOR	US	US Pop	WW	Certifications	Album
"Getting Scared" (Note: "Getting Scared" also appears on the soundtrack of I Still Know What You Did Last Summer.)	1997	—	—	—	—	—	—	—	—	—		I Megaphone
"Shine"	1998	—	—	—	—	—	—	—	—	—		I Megaphone
"Come Here Boy"	1998	—	48	—	—	—	—	—	—	—		I Megaphone
"Hide and Seek"	2005	125	14	— (Note: "Hide and Seek" did not chart on the Canadian Hot 100, but peaked at number 57 on the Hot Canadian Digital Song Sales chart.)	—	—	—	— (Note: "Hide and Seek" did not chart on the Billboard Hot 100, but peaked at number 6 on the Digital Song Sales chart.)	91	—	BPI: Silver; RIAA: Gold	Speak for Yourself
"Cumulus" (Note: "Speeding Cars" also appears on the B-side of "Hide and Seek".)	2005	—	—	—	—	—	—	—	—	—		Speak for Yourself
"Goodnight and Go"	2006	56	—	—	—	—	—	—	—	—		Speak for Yourself
"Headlock"	2006	30 (Note: "Headlock" originally peaked at number 74 on the UK Singles Chart after its release in 2006, and later peaked at number 30 in 2025.)	4 (Note: "Headlock" originally peaked at number 31 on the UK Indie Singles Chart in 2006 and later peaked at number 4 in 2025.)	72	43	31	68	82	—	97	BPI: Gold; RIAA: Platinum; RMNZ: Platinum	Speak for Yourself
"Not Now But Soon" (Note: "Not Now But Soon" also appears on the Japanese edition of Ellipse.)	2008	—	—	—	—	—	—	—	—	—		Heroes: Original Soundtrack
"First Train Home"	2009	—	—	63	—	—	—	— (Note: "First Train Home" did not chart on the Billboard Hot 100, but peaked at number 6 on the Bubbling Under Hot 100 chart.)	—	—		Ellipse
"Lifeline"	2011	—	—	—	—	—	—	—	—	—		Sparks
"Propeller Seeds"	2011	—	—	—	—	—	—	—	—	—		Sparks
"Neglected Space"	2011	—	—	—	—	—	—	—	—	—		Sparks
"Minds Without Fear" (with Vishal–Shekhar)	2011	—	—	—	—	—	—	—	—	—		Sparks
"Xizi She Knows"	2012	—	—	—	—	—	—	—	—	—		Sparks
"You Know Where to Find Me"	2012	—	—	—	—	—	—	—	—	—		Sparks
"Telemiscommunications" (Note: "Telemiscommunications" also appears on Deadmau5's six studio album Album Title Goes Here.) (with Deadmau5)	2013	—	—	—	—	—	—	—	—	—		Sparks
"Run-Time"	2014	—	—	—	—	—	—	—	—	—		Sparks
"Entanglement"	2014	—	—	—	—	—	—	—	—	—		Sparks
"Tiny Human"	2015	—	—	—	—	—	—	—	—	—		Non-album singles
"The Happy Song"	2016	—	28	—	—	—	73	—	—	—	BPI: Platinum; RIAA: Gold; RMNZ: 2× Platinum	Non-album singles
"Magic Me"	2017	—	—	—	—	—	—	—	—	—		Non-album singles
"Half Life" (live at R1 Reaktorhallen)	2018	—	—	—	—	—	—	—	—	—		Non-album singles
"The Quiet"	2019	—	—	—	—	—	—	—	—	—		Non-album singles
"I'm God" (with Clams Casino)	2020	—	—	—	—	—	—	—	—	—	BPI: Silver; RIAA: Gold; RMNZ: Platinum	Instrumental Relics
"Phase and Flow"	2020	—	—	—	—	—	—	—	—	—		Non-album singles
"Last Night of an Empire"	2020	—	—	—	—	—	—	—	—	—		Non-album singles
"What Have You Done to Me?"	2024	—	—	—	—	—	—	—	—	—		I Am ___
"Aftercare"	2025	—	—	—	—	—	—	—	—	—		I Am ___
"Have You Considered?" (with Pattie Gonia)	2026	—	—	—	—	—	—	—	—	—		Non-album singles
"Reckoning" (with Jon Hopkins)	2026	—	—	—	—	—	—	—	—	—		Non-album singles
"Chapter 4"	2026	—	—	—	—	—	—	—	—	—		Non-album singles
"—" denotes a recording that did not chart or was not released in that territory.

=== As featured artist ===
Title	Year	Peak chart positions			Certifications	Album
Title	Year	UK	UK Dance	BE (WA)	Certifications	Album
"Predictably, Unpredictable" (Urban Species featuring Imogen Heap)	1998	—	—	—		Blanket
"Blanket" (Urban Species featuring Imogen Heap)	1998	56	4	—		Blanket
"Embers of Love" (Mich Gerber featuring Imogen Heap)	2000	—	—	—		Amor Fati
"My Secret Friend" (IAMX featuring Imogen Heap)	2009	—	—	58		Kingdom of Welcome Addiction
"Headlock" (Ron van den Beuken featuring Imogen Heap)	2012	—	—	—	RMNZ: Platinum	Non-album single
"Shurayo" (Guy Sigsworth featuring Imogen Heap)	2019	—	—	—		Stet
"—" denotes a recording that did not chart or was not released in that territory.

=== Promotional singles ===
Title	Year	Peak chart positions					Certifications	Album
Title	Year	UK	CAN	NZ Hot	US Bub.	US R&B/ HH	Certifications	Album
"Oh Me, Oh My"	1998	—	—	—	—	—		iMegaphone
"Meantime" (with Guy Sigsworth)	1999	—	—	—	—	—		G:MT – Greenwich Mean Time
"Aeroplane"	2001	—	—	—	—	—		iMegaphone (reissue)
"Canvas"	2009	—	—	—	—	—		Ellipse
"Thriller"	2010	—	—	—	—	—		Dermot O'Leary Presents The Saturday Sessions (BBC Radio 2)
"I Smoked Away My Brain (I'm God x Demons Mashup)" (ASAP Rocky featuring Imogen Heap and Clams Casino)	2023	80	98	10	13	35	BPI: Gold; RIAA: 2× Platinum; RMNZ: Platinum	Don't Be Dumb
"False Gold" (with Karin Ann & ai.mogen)	2024	—	—	—	—	—		Non-album single
"Noise"	2024	—	—	—	—	—		I Am ___
"Distant Strangers" (Onefour featuring The Kid Laroi and Imogen Heap)	2025	—	—	—	—	—		Look at Me Now
"—" denotes a recording that did not chart or was not released in that territory.

== Other charted songs ==
Title	Year	Peak chart positions		Album
Title	Year	US Bub.	US Dance	Album
"Speeding Cars" (Note: "Speeding Cars" also appears on the B-side of "Goodnight and Go".)	2006	15	—	Speak for Yourself (Japanese edition)
"Me the Machine"	2014	—	40	Sparks
"—" denotes a recording that did not chart or was not released in that territory.

== Guest appearances ==
List of non-single guest appearances, showing year released, other artist(s) featured, and album name
Title	Year	Other artist(s)	Album
"Meantime"	1999	—N/a	G:MT – Greenwich Mean Time
"Valentine's Day Massacre"	2001	Rustic Overtones	¡Viva Nueva!
"Dirty Mind"	2001	Jeff Beck	You Had It Coming
"Rollin' and Tumblin'"	2001	Jeff Beck	You Had It Coming
"Second Sense"	2004	Jon Hopkins	Contact Note
"Not That Big"	2005	Temposhark	The Invisible Line
"Congratulations"	2005	Blue October	Foiled
"I'm a Lonely Little Petunia (In an Onion Patch)"	2005	—N/a	Six Feet Under, Vol. 2: Everything Ends
"Spooky"	2005	—N/a	Just Like Heaven
"Can't Take It In"	2005	—N/a	The Chronicles of Narnia: The Lion, the Witch and the Wardrobe
"P.I.N."	2006	J. Peter Schwalm	Musikain
"Glittering Cloud"	2006	—N/a	Plague Songs
"Loose Ends"	2007	—N/a	The Hills: The Soundtrack
"We Drift On"	2017	Dan Black	Do Not Revenge
"Sing"	2019	Guy Sigsworth	Stet
"Fountain"	2021	iamamiwhoami	Konsert
"Distant Strangers" (with The Kid Laroi)	2025	OneFour	Look at Me Now

== Music videos ==
List of music videos, showing year released and directors
Title	Year	Director(s)
"Getting Scared"	1997	Iain McKell
"Come Here Boy"	1998	Luke Scott
"Meantime"	1999	Tom Cotton
"Aeroplane"	2001	Si & Jon
"Hide and Seek"	2005	Joel Peissig
"Goodnight and Go"	2006	Arno Salters
"Headlock"	2006	Simon Henwood
"Canvas"	2009	Tom Kelly
"First Train Home"	2009	Es Devlin
"First Train Home" (Immi's Party version)	2009	Imogen Heap
"My Secret Friend" (with IAMX)	2009	Chris Corner
"Lifeline"	2011	Tom Kelly
"Propeller Seeds"	2011	Simon Henwood
"Neglected Space	2011	Thomas Ermacora
"Minds Without Fear" (with Vishal–Shekhar)	2011	FRED&NICK and Vishwesh Krishnamoorthy
"Xizi She Knows"	2012	Imogen Heap and Alexander Goodman
"You Know Where to Find Me"	2012	Imogen Heap
"Telemiscommunications" (with Deadmau5)	2013	Imogen Heap and Colin Gordon
"The Listening Chair"	2014	Imogen Heap and Alexander Goodman
"Me the Machine"	2014	Ersinhan Ersin and Leo Fawkes
"Cycle Song"	2014	Ben Henretig
"Climb to Sakteng"	2014	Ben Henretig
"Run-Time"	2014	Ben Henretig
"Entanglement"	2014	Michael Lebor
"The Beast"	2014	
"Tiny Human"	2015	Imogen Heap and Michael Lebor

== Songwriting credits ==
List of songs written or co-written for other artists, showing year released and album name
Title	Year	Artist(s)	Album
"Over to You Now"	2005	Britney Spears	Britney & Kevin: Chaotic
"Whatcha Say"	2009	Jason Derulo	Jason Derulo
"Clean"	2014	Taylor Swift	1989
"Goodnight n Go"	2018	Ariana Grande	Sweetener
