= Note-oriety =

American choir

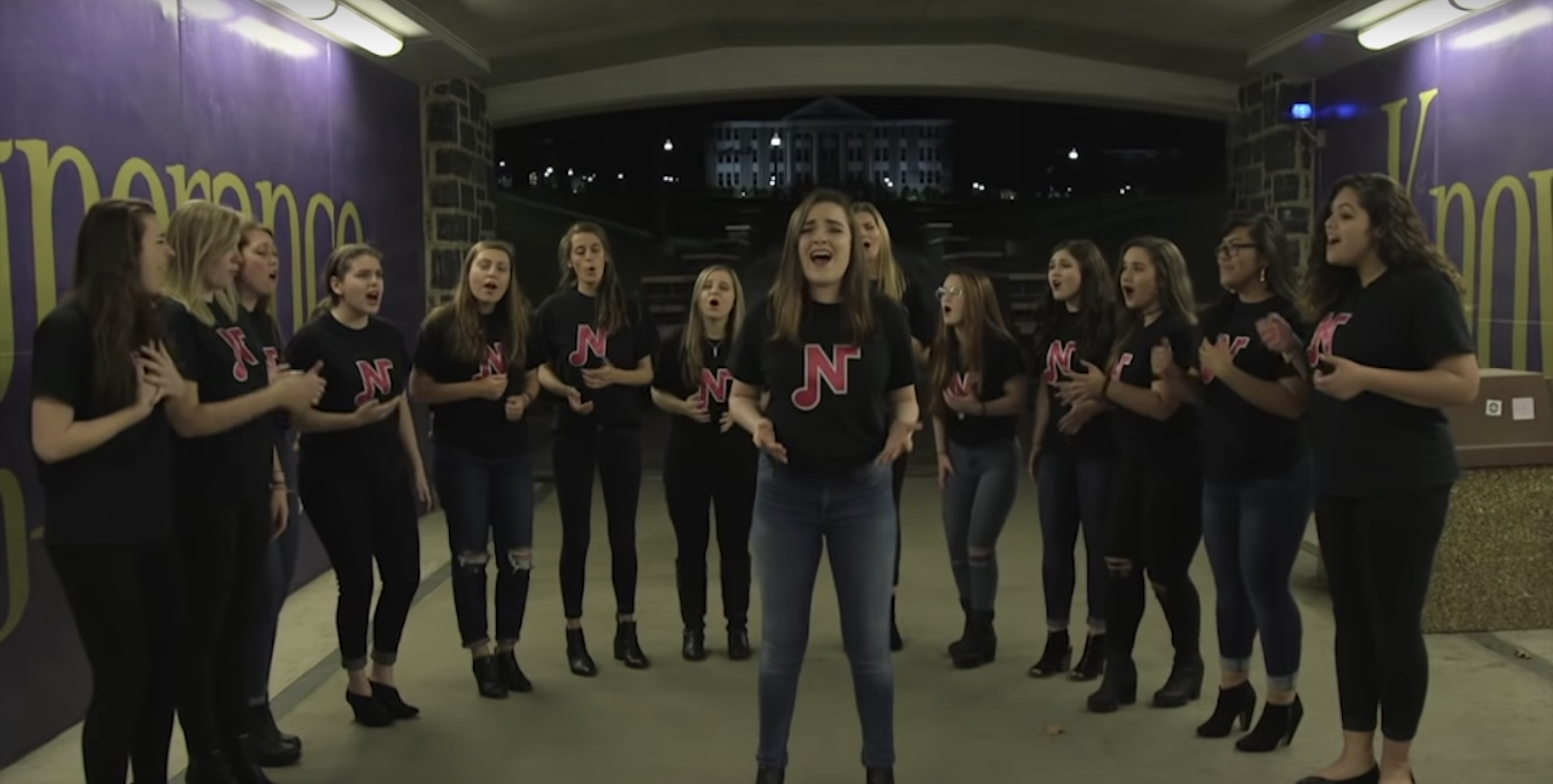
- Note-oriety

Background information
- Also known as: JMU Note-oriety, Note
- Origin: James Madison University, Harrisonburg, Virginia
- Genres: A cappella, collegiate a cappella
- Years active: 1998-Present
- Website: Official Website

Note-oriety is an upper voices a cappella singing group at James Madison University in the United States, founded in 1998 by Kelly Myer and Bonnie Estes. The group sings in and around Harrisonburg, Virginia, tours the east coast and other parts of the United States. Note-oriety is best known for the viral video of their cover version of Beyoncé's song "Pretty Hurts". The group has been featured in USA Today, The Huffington Post, and BuzzFeed, and the group has been praised by Nicki Minaj, TLC, and Kelly Clarkson. They have also been nominated for and received several awards from international organizations, notably, the Contemporary A Cappella Society and the Recorded A Cappella Review Board. Note-oriety has performed all over the country, including The White House, the Lincoln Center, and Michelle Obama and Oprah Winfrey's United State of Women Summit.

== History ==
Note-oriety was founded in 1998 by Kelly Myer and Bonnie Estes as a sister group to the premier a Cappella group at JMU, The Madison Project. It is the first all-female group at James Madison University. The student-run musical group performs in and around Harrisonburg, Virginia and up and down the East Coast of the United States. In addition to various gigs, Note-oriety holds a concert once per semester, typically at the end of each semester. Additionally, they go on tour approximately bi-yearly.

Note-oriety has competed in several competitions throughout the years. In 2012, they won "Best Choreography" at SingStrong Aca Idol. In 2013, they won 1st place at the SingStrong Aca Idol Competition as well as winning "Audience Favorite". Note-oriety has also competed in the International Championship of Collegiate A Cappella, most recently in 2019, where they placed third.

Throughout their 20 years, Note-oriety has released several studio albums and singles. In 2015, they released their self-titled album Note-oriety. The album was nominated for numerous awards and was selected as the Recorded A Cappella Review Board's 2015 Album of the Year. The group has been nominated for several CARA awards through the years, most recently winning "Best Song" in the Collegiate Female category for "Bang Bang" on Note-oriety. The music video for "Pretty Hurts" from this album garnered over half a million views. The video went viral after it was released, and was praised by Nicki Minaj. Note-oriety's eighth album, titled XX in honor of their twentieth anniversary, was released April 29, 2018. Their most recent album, Note to Self, was released in July 2020.

Note-oriety as a group works for charities as well as groups promoting Women's empowerment, and has been involved with numerous philanthropic events since its founding. In 2016, Note-oriety performed at the United State of Women Summit in Washington, D.C. and in 2017 the group performed at The National Crittenton Foundation's national conference "In Solidarity We Rise: Healing, Opportunity, and Justice for Girls". In 2018, College Magazine named Note-oriety one of The 10 Female Groups Running the A Cappella World.

== Discography ==
- Overquota (2000)
- Lights Out (2002)
- Fusion (2005)
- Bettin' High (2007)
- Get Gone (2010)
- "Only Girl in the World" (2011)
- I'll Never Say (2012)
- "DNA" (2013)
- Note-oriety (2015)
- "Boogie Woogie/Salute" (2016)
- XX (2018)
- "Fall in Line" (2019)
- "God Is a Woman" (2020)
- Note to Self (2020)
- "Beggin'" (2023)
- "Mind Your Own" (2024)
- "Snow Angel" (2025)

== Awards and nominations ==
=== Musical awards ===
Note-oriety awards and nominations
Awards and nominations
Award	Wins	Nominations
CARAs	1	12
RARB	3	N/A
sing	2	N/A
AVAs	3	5
Voices Only	1	N/A
ICCA	2	N/A
SingStrong Aca-Idol	7	N/A

Totals (Note: Certain award groups do not simply award one winner. They acknowledge several different recipients, have runners-up, and have third place. Since this is a specific recognition and is different from losing an award, runner-up mentions are considered wins in this award tally. For simplification and to avoid errors, each award in this list has been presumed to have had a prior nomination.)
- Wins: 20
- Nominations: 14

Contemporary A Cappella Recording Awards (CARAs)
Year	Nominee/work	Award	Result
2025	Note-oriety for "Oh My God" by Adele	Best Upper Voices Collegiate Song	Nominated
2025	Note-oriety for "Hypotheticals" by Lake Street Dive	Best Upper Voices Collegiate Song	Nominated
2025	Sophie Castro for "Wouldn't Come Back" by Trousdale	Best Upper Voices Collegiate Arrangement	Nominated
2025	Note-oriety for "Mind Your Own"	Best Upper Voices Collegiate Album or EP	Nominated
2025	Note-oriety for "80s Mercedes" by Maren Morris	Best Country Song	Nominated
2021	Emma Wagner for "I Don't Think About You" by Kelly Clarkson	Best Upper Voices Collegiate Solo	Nominated
2021	Emma Wagner for "Dreams" by Fleetwood Mac	Best Upper Voices Collegiate Arrangement	Nominated
2021	Note to Self (2020)	Best Upper Voices Collegiate Album	Nominated
2021	Sara Edwards for "Runaway" by Aurora	Best Professional Arrangement for a Scholastic Group	Nominated
2019	Maggie Rabe for "Feel It Still" by Portugal. The Man	Best Female Collegiate Arrangement	Nominated
2016	Note-oriety (2015)	Best Female Collegiate Album	Nominated
2016	"Bang Bang" by Jessie J, Ariana Grande, and Nicki Minaj	Best Female Collegiate Song	Won
2016	Zoe Elizabeth McCray for "Bang Bang" by Jessie J, Ariana Grande, and Nicki Minaj	Best Female Collegiate Arrangement	Nominated
2014	"DNA" by Little Mix	Best Female Collegiate Song	Nominated
2013	"Earth" by Imogen Heap	Best Female Collegiate Song	Nominated
2013	Addison Balser for "Turning Tables" by Adele	Best Female Collegiate Solo	Nominated
2001	Mandi Meros, Overquota (2000)	Best Female Collegiate Solo	Nominated

Recorded A Cappella Review Board (RARB)
Year	Nominee/work	Award	Result
2015	Note-oriety (2015)	Album of the Year	Won
2015	"Bang Bang" by Jessie J, Ariana Grande, and Nicki Minaj	Track of the Year	Won

=== Selection for "Best of" compilation albums ===
Best Of College A Cappella
Year	Nominee/Work	Award	Result
2025	"Oh My God" by Adele	BOCA 2025	Won

sing
Year	Nominee/work	Award	Result
2015	"Bang Bang" by Jessie J, Ariana Grande, and Nicki Minaj	sing 12: This Big!	Won
2013	"DNA" by Little Mix	sing 10: Neon	Won

Voices Only
Year	Nominee/work	Award	Result
2015	"Lies" by Marina and the Diamonds	Voices Only 2015	Won

=== Competitions ===
Competition Placements and Awards
Year	Competition	Award	Result
2008	ICCA Quarterfinals	Outstanding Soloist: Jonnelle Morris for "Bring Me Down"	Won
2012	SingStrong Aca-Idol	Best Choreography	Won
2013	SingStrong Aca-Idol	Aca-Idol Overall Winner	1st Place
2013	SingStrong Aca-Idol	Audience Favorite	Won
2013	SingStrong Aca-Idol	Outstanding Soloist	1st Place
2013	SingStrong Aca-Idol	Outstanding Vocal Percussion	2nd Place
2013	SingStrong Aca-Idol	Outstanding Visual Presentation	1st Place
2019	ICCA Quarterfinals	Third Place	Won
2019	Shenandoah Valley Sing-In	Overall Winner	Won
2019	Shenandoah Valley Sing-In	Audience Favorite	Won
2020	Mid-Atlantic Harmony Sweepstakes A Cappella Festival	Third Place	Won
2025	ICCA Quarterfinals	Participated	

=== Other Awards ===
A Cappella Video Awards (AVA)
Year	Nominee/work	Award	Result
2025	"80s Mercedes" Music Video	Best Country Video	Won
2019	"R&B Medley" Music Video	Outstanding Choreography / Staging	Nominated
2019	"R&B Medley" Music Video	Outstanding Costume / Makeup	Runner-up
2019	"R&B Medley" Music Video	Outstanding Video Editing	Nominated
2019	"R&B Medley" Music Video	Best Female Collegiate Video	Won
2019	"R&B Medley" Music Video	Best R&B Video	Won
