= Note-oriety (album) =

Studio album by Note-oriety
- Released: January 23, 2015
- Genre: A cappella
- Length: 38:53
- Label: Note-oriety
- Producer: James Gammon Productions

Note-oriety chronology
| I'll Never Say (2012) | Note-oriety (2015) | XX (album by Note-oriety) (2018) |

Note-oriety is the self-titled album released by collegiate a cappella group Note-oriety of James Madison University in 2015. It is the group's seventh studio album.

== Track listing ==
1. Bang Bang by Jessie J, Ariana Grande, and Nicki Minaj
2. Lies by Marina and the Diamonds
3. Stay/What Now (Mashup) by Rihanna
4. Pretty Hurts by Beyoncé
5. Somethin' Bad by Miranda Lambert
6. Just a Game by Birdy
7. Not Ready to Make Nice by Dixie Chicks
8. Blown Away by Carrie Underwood
9. Settle Down by kimbra
10. A Little Party Never Killed Nobody (All We Got) by Fergie (singer)
11. My Heart With You by The Rescues

== Awards ==
=== Musical Awards ===
==== Contemporary A Cappella Recording Awards (CARAs) ====
| Year | Nominee/work | Award | Result |
|---|---|---|---|
| 2016 | Note-oriety (2015) | Best Female Collegiate Album | Nominated |
| 2016 | "Bang Bang" by Jessie J, Ariana Grande, and Nicki Minaj | Best Female Collegiate Song | Won |
| 2016 | Zoe-Elizabeth McCray ('16) for "Bang Bang" | Best Female Collegiate Arrangement | Nominated |

==== Recorded A Cappella Review Board (RARB) ====
| Year | Nominee/work | Award | Result |
|---|---|---|---|
| 2015 | Note-oriety (2015) | Album of the Year | Won |
| 2015 | "Bang Bang" by Jessie J, Ariana Grande, and Nicki Minaj | Track of the Year | Won |

=== Selection for "Best of" Compilation Albums ===
| Year | Nominee/work | Award | Result |
|---|---|---|---|
| 2015 | "Bang Bang" by Jessie J, Ariana Grande, and Nicki Minaj | sing 12: This Big! | Won |
| 2015 | "Lies" by Marina and the Diamonds | Voices Only 2015 | Won |

== "Pretty Hurts" music video ==
Note-oriety released a music video along with the album, featuring their cover of "Pretty Hurts" by Beyoncé. The music video cover went viral almost immediately, and currently has over 500,000 views on YouTube. The video was featured in HuffPost, USA Today, and BuzzFeed, among others. The video was praised by Nicki Minaj on her official Facebook page.
