= First Train Home =

Single by Imogen Heap

from the album Ellipse
- Released: 10 July 2009 (radio); 14 July 2009 (digital)
- Genre: Electronica, ambient
- Length: 4:13 (album version); 3:34 (radio edit)
- Label: Megaphonic
- Songwriter(s): Imogen Heap
- Producer(s): Imogen Heap

Imogen Heap singles chronology
"Not Now But Soon" (2008)	"First Train Home" (2009)	"My Secret Friend" (2009)

Music video
- "First Train Home" on YouTube

"First Train Home" is a song by British singer/songwriter Imogen Heap, and the only single off her third solo album Ellipse.

== Background ==
Imogen Heap revealed a story behind the creation of the song in a few interviews. She claimed:

"I was trying to project manage my studio, and the house and moving in never having done anything like that before is EXTREMELY stressful. [...] I was so stressed out. So my friend rang me up and said “I never see you anymore, why don’t you come down, you’re not making the record yet – come down”. So I went down to Brighton and all the way on the train I was making phone calls, and I wanted to just be back home working on it. [...] So we went out this festival – it was good – but being around music made me even more jittery like I should be doing more and getting home. I didn’t really have a good night really. I was trying so hard to be into the night and they were all nice people and everything but I just wasn’t into it, but I just couldn’t escape and I couldn’t get home and it was too late and lived three hours away. So I was stuck [...] Literally, you just want to scream and slap everyone around (not really slapping everyone around - joking), but you know you just don’t want to be there. Panic attack set in. Cold sweats. And I just wanted to get on the first train home basically. I did eventually – got the first train home, stayed up all night and wrote the song on the piano at home really quickly. What’s lovely about it is that I recorded the song in the studio which is directly underneath the dining room where the piano is. And then yesterday [says very excitedly], I filmed the video for it which is where I wrote the song!"

== Premiere ==
The song premiered on Santa Monica's KCRW radio station on 10 July at 10:30 PDT, accompanying a ten-minute interview with Heap. Within hours the song was uploaded onto multiple websites.

== Release ==
"First Train Home" was released through iTunes US and iTunes Canada on 14 July, with the option to pre-order the full album Ellipse or its deluxe version. The song was released on other iTunes internationally on 15 July, also giving the option to pre-order Ellipse or its deluxe version.

The song was also released onto Amazon.com on 14 July and Amazon.co.uk on 15 July.

== Music video ==
There are two versions of the video for First Train Home.

Imogen Heap caught in a zoetrope in the first version of the music video.

=== First version ===
The first one was premiered on 17 August and directed by Es Devlin. The video shows Imogen trapped in a zoetrope running through various hallways, through people holding drinks and speaking, some of them almost transparent. The video features a change of different camera angles and perspectives. The video shoot took place on 29 and 30 June.

=== Second version ===
As Imogen was not happy with the result she decided to direct herself an alternative video for the song. The shoot took place on 15 August at the artist's house. The video shows Imogen surrounded by many party-goers in a fancy dress.

== Live performances ==
Imogen Heap performed the song for the very first time live on the Late Show with David Letterman. The episode was taped on 24 August and aired 28 August.

She also played the track live on WNYC's show Soundcheck along with another "Ellipse" song, "Half Life" on 25 August.

== Charts ==
2009 weekly chart performance for "First Train Home"
Chart (2009)	Peak position
Canada (Canadian Hot 100)	63
US Bubbling Under Hot 100 (Billboard)	6

== Track listing ==
Digital Download, Bundle 1
No.	Title	Length
1.	"First Train Home"	4:13

Digital Download, Bundle 2
No.	Title	Length
1.	"First Train Home"	4:12
2.	"First Train Home (Jon Hopkins remix)"	3:06

iTunes Store Bonus Videos
No.	Title	Length
3.	"First Train Home (Immi's party version)"	3:33
4.	"Making of First Train Home (Immi's party version)"	2:51
