= Telemiscommunications =

Single by Deadmau5 and Imogen Heap

from the album Album Title Goes Here and Sparks
- Released: March 12, 2013
- Genre: Electropop; ambient
- Length: 4:07
- Label: Mau5trap; Ultra
- Songwriters: Joel Zimmerman; Imogen Heap
- Producers: Deadmau5; Imogen Heap

Deadmau5 singles chronology
"Channel 42" (2013)	"Telemiscommunications" (2013)	"Suckfest9001" (2013)

Imogen Heap singles chronology
"You Know Where to Find Me" (2012)	"Telemiscommunications" (2013)	"Run-Time" (2014)

"Telemiscommunications" is a song by Canadian electronic music producer Deadmau5 and English singer Imogen Heap. It was released on March 12, 2013, by Ultra Records as the fifth single from Deadmau5's sixth studio album Album Title Goes Here (2012) and the seventh single from Imogen Heap's fourth studio album Sparks (2014). The song is an electropop ballad whose lyrics depict a dysfunctional phone conversation.

== Background and release ==
Work on "Telemiscommunications" began after Deadmau5 emailed Heap. According to Deadmau5, the two never met in person, and only sent two emails and made two phone calls to one another during the making of the song.

On September 25, 2012, "Telemiscommunications" appeared as the thirteenth track on the 2012 album Album Title Goes Here. It was released with four remixes as a remix EP on March 12, 2013, through Zimmerman's label Mau5trap.

== Composition ==
"Telemiscommunications" is an ambient electropop ballad with elements of glitch. The song's lyrics are written partially as a phone conversation, with Heap singing about yearning for the touch of the person on the other end, and are a social commentary on the effect of technology on relationships. Instrumentally, it features "atmospheric" percussion and "somber" piano chords. Writing for Billboard, Gordon Murray described "Telemiscommunications" as "decidedly mellow", while Rolling Stone India called Heap's vocals on the song "mellow" and "otherworldly". Paste's Megan Farokhmanesh described the song as "slow" and "somber".

== Critical reception ==
David Jeffries of AllMusic identified "Telemiscommunications" as one of the "most rewarding moments" on Album Title Goes Here, describing it as a "beautiful electro-haiku". MusicOMH's Andy Baber named the song as a stand out track on Sparks, writing that its "minimal tapping beat and swarming atmospherics provid[e] the perfect accompaniment to Heap’s always engaging vocal". Andrew Lockwood of Contactmusic.com also singled out "Telemiscommunications" as one of the "highs" and "undoubtedly great standalone tracks" on Sparks. For BBC, Louis Pattinson wrote that the song was the only time on Album Title Goes Here that Deadmau5 "really find[s] something approaching emotion".

Writing for PopMatters, Darryl G. Wright described the song as "filler" on Album Title Goes Here, writing that it was "too minimal to be interesting" with a beat that "distracts". John Calvert of Fact wrote that "Telemiscommunications" was "destined for some self-satisfied American independent film about a 20-something man who’s really a boy, and his kooky love interest."

== Music video ==
The music video for "Telemiscommunications" was released on March 12, 2013, during a Google+ Hangout with Deadmau5 and Heap. The video features animations from 20 different animators, submitted as part of an international contest held by Heap.

== Track listing ==
Digital download - Remixes EP
No.	Title	Length
1.	"Telemiscommunications"	4:07
2.	"Telemiscommunications" (Crookers Remix)	5:04
3.	"Telemiscommunications" (Kolsch Remix)	9:08
4.	"Telemiscommunications" (Copy Paste Soul Remix)	6:09
5.	"Telemiscommunications" (John Roman Remix)	5:16
