= Sparks (Imogen Heap album) =

Studio album by Imogen Heap
- Released: 19 August 2014
- Recorded: 2011–2014
- Studios: Purcell Room (London); The Hideaway (Havering); Bedfords Park Walled Garden (Havering); Samode Palace (Jaipur); Room 2105 at the Meander Tree Hotel (Hangzhou); Mau5trap (Ontario); Various locations (Edinburgh, Bhutan, Hangzhou, around the world)
- Genre: Electropop
- Length: 59:34
- Labels: Megaphonic; RCA; Sony Legacy
- Producers: Imogen Heap; Deadmau5; Vishal–Shekhar; Nick Ryan

Imogen Heap chronology
Ellipse (2009)	Sparks (2014)	The Music of Harry Potter and the Cursed Child – In Four Contemporary Suites (2018)

Singles from Sparks
- 1. "Lifeline" Released: 28 March 2011; 2. "Propeller Seeds" Released: 8 July 2011; 3. "Neglected Space" Released: 21 October 2011; 4. "Minds Without Fear" Released: 21 October 2011; 5. "Xizi She Knows" Released: 5 February 2012; 6. "You Know Where to Find Me" Released: 2 November 2012; 7. "Telemiscommunications" Released: 12 March 2013; 8. "Run-Time" Released: 30 June 2014; 9. "Entanglement" Released: 15 August 2014

Sparks is the fourth studio album by English singer Imogen Heap, released on 19 August 2014 through Megaphonic Records in the United Kingdom and through RCA Records in the United States. Recorded between 2011 and 2014 across four different continents, with a new song being written and released every three months, it was primarily written and produced by Heap, with additional writing and production from collaborators Deadmau5, Vishal–Shekhar, and B.o.B, as well as production from Nick Ryan.

The album is primarily an electropop record, also incorporating of other genres such as dance-pop, ambient, bhangra, a cappella, Bhutanese folk, and spoken word. It is also loosely a concept album, where each song makes use of different technological innovations such as crowdsourcing, 3D audio effects, reactive music, and a pair of musical gloves developed by Heap. Lyrically, the record covers a number of mostly disparate themes, among them being technology, relationships, sex, and Heap's life.

In the United States, Sparks sold ten thousand album-equivalent units, debuting and peaking at number 21 on the Billboard 200 chart and at number one on the Billboard Dance/Electronic Albums chart, giving Heap her second chart-topper on the latter. The album was released with a standard edition, a deluxe edition, and a deluxe box set, the last of which was nominated for Best Boxed or Special Limited Edition Package at the 57th Annual Grammy Awards and for Special Catalogue Release of the Year at the 2015 AIM Independent Music Awards.

== Background ==
"I know I'm certainly not going to be doing another record like this one [Ellipse], going in start to finish and two years later having an album ... I really want to get in the position for new recordings where I do one song and release it the next day. That's kind of the ideal scenario for me."

— Heap for Future Music magazine, in 2009.

Following the release of her third studio album, Ellipse, Heap was "fed up" with her regular album-making process, feeling that she consistently found herself "in a rut" and lacking inspiration while working alone in the studio. Because of this, she decided that she would instead be releasing a new song once every three months, each recorded over a fortnight and released with a video, starting in March 2011 and ending in 2013 with several songs that would be compiled into her forthcoming album, in order to avoid having the experience be "insular" and "confined" as it had been with previous records.

== Development, recording and release ==
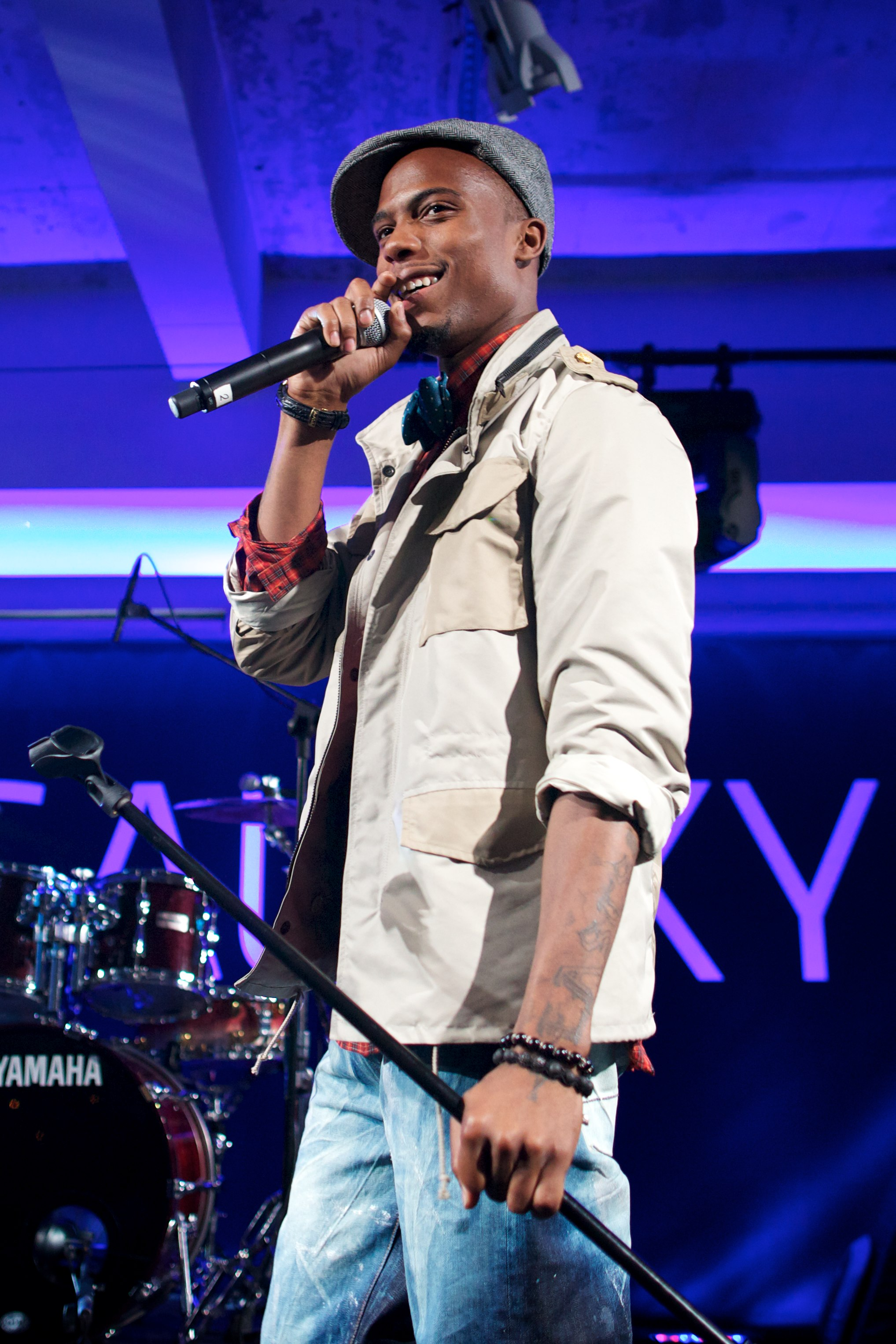
Sparks included several of Heap's collaborations with other artists, including Vishal–Shekhar (left), Deadmau5 (center), and B.o.B. (right).

Heap revealed in March 2011 that she was beginning to work on the lead single from the album, "Lifeline", then under the working title "Heapsong1", asking fans to send in sounds and words to be used in the song. Each of the singles were released with the same title with different numbers corresponding to their chronological release dates. On 28 March, the track was premiered worldwide through her website via Ustream alongside a remix by British record producer Tim Exile. The album's second single, "Propeller Seeds", was released on 8 July 2011 through Megaphonic Records.

Heap began working on a project in late 2011 to restore an abandoned Georgian walled garden in Bedfords Park near her home in Romford, London with the charity organization Clear Village–founded by her then-boyfriend, Simon Parkinson–and 20 volunteers, and wrote "Neglected Space" as part of the project, releasing the song on 21 October 2011. After meeting Vishal Dadlani of Indian production duo Vishal–Shekhar in Singapore, Heap and Dadlani wrote and recorded the fourth single from the album, "Minds Without Fear", in the Samode Palace in Jaipur for the debut episode of the MTV India musical television series The Dewarists. Though the song was not initially intended to appear on the album, she decided after recording it that every collaboration she did from then on would be included on the album.

During a six-week stay in Hangzhou, Zhejiang, China in the fall of 2011 funded by the British Council and PRS for Music, Heap wrote and recorded the fifth single from the album, "Xizi She Knows", in one day. During the making of Sparks, Heap began working on The Gloves Project, a project to create a pair of musical gloves with a team of developers and a designer, in order to create the song "Me the Machine". On 22 April 2012, "Me the Machine" was premiered during a live performance alongside the release of the crowdsourced nature film Love the Earth, which was co-produced by Heap with her then-partner, Thomas Ermacora. Recording for "You Know Where to Find Me" began in the Artangel-curated A Room for London (an elevated boat, atop the Southbank Centre, London), with the Thames Tideway as its main theme and premiered 18 October 2012, on Google+ Hangouts.

In mid-2014, Heap began working with now-defunct startup RjDj and Intel to develop a running app that would create generative music, which would change tempo depending on the user's running pace. She recorded "Run-Time", the ninth single from the album, using the app, and released the song on 30 June 2014. "Entanglement", the final single from the album, was originally written to play during a sex scene in the 2011 film The Twilight Saga: Breaking Dawn – Part 1, the fourth installation in The Twilight Saga film series, though the song was scrapped from the final cut. "Climb to Sakteng" and "Cycle Song" are two instrumental songs and used for the soundtrack of the documentary film Crossing Bhutan. Directed by Ben Henretig, the film premiered on 6 February 2016 at the Santa Barbara International Film Festival.

Sparks was released under Heap's own label, Megaphonic Records, in the UK, and through RCA Records in the US. A deluxe box set of the album was designed by Andy Carne, who had previously worked with Heap on the digital package for Ellipse, and included a 120-page hardcover book detailing the making of the album, 12 data DVDs for each of the songs on the album (each of which included high-resolution, 5.1 surround sound, and instrumental versions of the songs as well as making-of videos), a deck of playing cards with QR codes to access exclusive digital content, two 10-inch vinyl records, a standard CD of the album, and another DVD containing music videos for each song. Pre-order customers of the box set also received an image of their footprint printed on pulp made from Heap's personal belongings along with words from Heap and were invited to a party at her house.

=== Artwork ===
The album's cover art is a portrait of Heap made up of 2,500 footprints from each of those who pre-ordered the deluxe box set of the album. Carne built an image processor to balance, scale, and isolate the footprints, which were uploaded to a microsite, into a uniform format, and used JavaScript to generate a circular pattern for the footprints. Heap stated, "The album is...in some ways for me grounded with fans' footprints bringing the finishing touch for the album art, as so many of them came along for the ride."

== Composition ==
Sparks is a concept album, with each song meant to represent a different technological development. The album features many genres throughout its tracks, though the majority of the album is electropop.

The opening track, "You Know Where to Find Me", is a "mournful" pop track written from the perspective of the River Thames. On the song, Heap plays 13 different pianos owned by her fans in Edinburgh; the song's instrumentation also includes strings. "Entanglement" is a "sublimely soft ode" to sex sung over an "atmospheric" synth melody, inspired by Heap's "dream scenario" in which she meets the "perfect man" and has "love for life" with him. "Lifeline", the album's lead single, was inspired by an account of the 2011 Tōhoku earthquake and tsunami describing a man riding his bicycle away from the tsunami. The song was created using crowdsourcing, as the song's instrumental features a selection from over 800 audio samples (called "seeds") sent in by fans, including a match being struck, bicycle spokes, and opening and closing doors. The song also samples a recording of Heap's niece's heartbeat from six hours before she was born. The basis for the song's lyrics was a "word cloud" in which there were over 4,000 words sent in by fans. "The Listening Chair" is an "energetic" a cappella song depicting Heap's life, in which each minute represents seven years. She has stated that she plans on adding a new minute to the song once every seven years.

The "lush", "energetic" instrumental track "Cycle Song" takes inspiration from Bhutanese folk music and uses samples of sounds recorded during Heap's trip to Bhutan, including temple bells, donkeys, nuns chanting, and traditional drums. "Telemiscommunications" is a "mellow", "somber" ambient electropop ballad with elements of glitch. The song's lyrics are written partially as a phone conversation, with Heap singing about yearning for the touch of the person on the other end, and are a social commentary on the effect of technology on relationships. Instrumentally, it features "atmospheric" percussion and piano chords. The "haunting" spoken word piece "Neglected Space" is written from the perspective of an abandoned Georgian walled garden in Bedfords Park. "Minds Without Fear" is a bhangra song with lyrics based on the 1913 poem "Chitto Jetha Bhayshunyo" ("Where the Mind is Without Fear") by Bengali poet Rabindranath Tagore about Tagore's vision for India's independence, featuring background vocals from schoolchildren from Jaipur as well as naqareh and other instruments played by a local band. The song "Me the Machine" was recorded using the Mi.Mu gloves, gestural-music wired gloves with a motion-sensing microchip.

"Run-Time" is a "propulsive" dance-pop track created using a generative or "reactive" music-making fitness app developed by Heap with Intel and RjDj. "Climb to Sakteng", similarly to "Cycle Song", is inspired by Bhutanese folk music, and features samples of field recordings from Heap's hike up the Himalayas as well as a kitchen whisk and other household items, and vocals from Bhutanese musician and archivist Kheng Sonam Dorji. Recordings from Heap's trip to Hangzhou, China were sampled extensively in "Xizi She Knows". The song's beat is taken from the sound of newspaper printing presses, while its tempo is equivalent to that of a recording of primary school teacher leading the class's eye exercises, which is also sampled in the song. The bridge uses a recording of a Chinese woman yelling from a hilltop temple. Album closer "Propeller Seeds" was produced with sound engineer Nick Ryan and, according to Heap, was the first song to ever use 3D audio effects. Its writing took inspiration from fans, whom Heap asked to send her descriptions of times in their life when "everything seemed to click".

=== Music videos ===
The music video for "Telemiscommunications" was released on 12 March 2013, during a Google+ Hangout with Deadmau5 and Heap. The video features animations from 20 different animators, submitted as part of an international contest held by Heap. The "Lifeline" video, directed by a fan to whom Heap was introduced through Twitter, depicts Heap naked, and uses clips from film and animation projects sent in by fans. The music video for "Entanglement" was filmed alone by Heap and her partner, Michael Lebor, and features "intimate" slow-motion footage of Heap nude in bed with Lebor. The music video for "Cycle Song" and "Climb to Sakteng" premiered on 17 July 2014. The video for "Run-Time" was filmed by Ben Henretig in New York City and shows Heap running and dancing throughout Manhattan, eventually jogging over the Brooklyn Bridge. Over 300 people volunteered to appear in the "Xizi She Knows" video, which compiles clips from Heap's trip to Hangzhou, including skateboarders surrounded by a circle of taxis, primary school children doing eye exercises, and a 60-year-old man doing a flag dance.

== Critical reception ==
Professional ratings
Aggregate scores
Source	Rating
Metacritic	70/100
Review scores
Source	Rating
AllMusic	4/5 stars
American Songwriter	3/5 stars
Consequence of Sound	B-
Contactmusic.com	3.5/5
Drowned in Sound	8/10
Financial Times	3/5 stars
The Guardian	2/5 stars
Lincoln Journal Star	B
The Observer	4/5 stars
Sputnikmusic	3.3/5

Critical reviews for Sparks were generally positive. At review aggregator Metacritic, the album received a weighted average of 70 out of 100 based on 11 reviews from critics, indicating "generally favorable reviews".

AllMusic's Stephen Thomas Erlewine called the album "cerebral", "worldly", and "ambitious", remarking that it "refus[es] to take a direct route when a detour will do. As such, it sometimes walks the line between close listening and a wash of sound, but it's intriguing from whatever angle it is approached". Haydon Spenceley wrote for Drowned in Sound that Sparks was "ambitious and well-realised", stating that, although it tried to be "quirky and difficult" and felt "at times over-long and a little self-indulgent", the album was "a wonderfully satisfying listen" and "a pop tour de force of the best kind" made up of "remarkably consistent" songs. In The Observer, Ally Carnwarth said, "it's hard not to admire the elaborate genesis of Imogen Heap's fourth solo record...persevere and you'll be well rewarded; its feverish, idea-glutted electropop frequently resolves into something thrilling." Carnworth also noted that the record "often feels more like a particularly ambitious performance art project than a collection of songs".

== Accolades ==
Allan Raible of ABC News placed the deluxe edition of Sparks on his list of the 50 best albums of 2014, at number 41.

Awards and nominations

Name of the award ceremony, award category, and the result of the nomination
Organization	Category	Result	Ref.
Grammy Awards	Best Boxed or Special Limited Edition Package	Nominated	
AIM Independent Music Awards	Special Catalogue Release of the Year	Nominated	

== Commercial performance ==
In the United States, Sparks debuted and peaked at number 21 on the Billboard 200 chart, having sold ten thousand copies in its first week. The album also debuted at number one on the Billboard Dance/Electronic Albums chart, giving Heap her second number-one on the chart after her previous record, Ellipse (2009) and extending her record as the artist with the third-most weeks on the chart, behind Lady Gaga and M.I.A.

== Track listing ==
All tracks are written by and produced by Heap, except where noted.

Standard edition
No.	Title	Writer(s)	Producer(s)	Length
1.	"You Know Where to Find Me"			4:56
2.	"Entanglement"			4:19
3.	"The Listening Chair"			5:24
4.	"Cycle Song"			2:25
5.	"Telemiscommunications" (with Deadmau5)	Heap; Joel Zimmerman	Heap; Zimmerman	3:55
6.	"Lifeline"			4:46
7.	"Neglected Space"			5:13
8.	"Minds Without Fear"	Heap; Shekhar Ravijani; Vishal Dadlani	Heap; Ravijani; Dadlani	3:41
9.	"Me the Machine"			4:26
10.	"Run-Time"			4:56
11.	"Climb to Sakteng"			3:37
12.	"The Beast"	Heap; Bobby Ray Simmons Jr.		3:26
13.	"Xizi She Knows"			4:43
14.	"Propeller Seeds"		Heap; Nick Ryan	3:51
Total length:				59:34

Deluxe edition bonus tracks
No.	Title	Writer(s)	Producer(s)	Length
15.	"You Know Where to Find Me" (instrumental)			4:55
16.	"Entanglement" (instrumental)			4:19
17.	"The Listening Chair" (instrumental)			5:19
18.	"Cycle Song" (instrumental)			2:25
19.	"Telemiscommunications" (instrumental)	Heap; Zimmermann	Heap; Zimmermann	3:53
20.	"Lifeline" (instrumental)			4:46
21.	"Neglected Space" (instrumental)			5:13
22.	"Minds Without Fear" (instrumental)	Heap; Ravijani; Dadlani	Heap; Ravijani; Dadlani	3:41
23.	"Me the Machine" (instrumental)			4:27
24.	"Run-Time" (instrumental)			4:56
25.	"Climb to Sakteng" (instrumental)			3:37
26.	"The Beast" (instrumental)	Heap; Simmons Jr.		3:26
27.	"Xizi She Knows" (instrumental)			4:40
28.	"Propeller Seeds" (instrumental)		Heap; Ryan	3:50
Total length:				1:58:57

== Charts ==
Chart (2014)	Peak position
UK Albums Chart	40
US Billboard 200	21
US Top Dance Albums (Billboard)	1
US Indie Store Album Sales (Billboard)	17

== Personnel ==
Credits adapted from AllMusic and Tidal.

Performance

- Imogen Heap – vocals (all tracks), background vocals (tracks 2–4, 9–12), bass (tracks 2, 4, 9–12), cello (tracks 2, 10), drums (tracks 1–2, 4, 9–12), keyboards (tracks 2, 4, 9–12), percussion (tracks 2–4, 9–12), piano (tracks 2, 4, 9–12), xylophone (track 9)
- Kheng Sonam Dorji – vocals (track 11)
- The Papuler Band from Samode Village – background vocals (track 8)
- B.o.B – background vocals (track 12), keyboards (track 12), percussion (track 12)
- Nuns at Penjor Choling Nunnery – chant (track 4)
- Ian Burdge – cello (track 2)
- Emma Smith – strings (tracks 2, 4, 10, 12), recording (tracks 2, 4, 10, 12)
- Vincent Sipprell – viola (tracks 2, 4, 10, 12), recording (tracks 2, 4, 10, 12)
- Zhao Yiwei – pipa (track 4)
- Banwari Lal Ji – strings (track 8)
- Hannah Brock – guzheng (track 10)
- Imogen Ridge – harp (track 10)
- Evie Hilyer-Ziegler – violin (track 10)
- Li Benxian – bass (track 13)
- Li Gongyi – drums (track 13)
- Jonathan Angwin – balloon (track 14)
- Rachel Blackford – balloon (track 14)
- Mark Taylor – balloon (track 14)

Technical

- Imogen Heap – production (all tracks), engineering (tracks 2–4, 7, 9–12), recording (tracks 1, 5, 13), mixing (tracks 2–5, 7–13), programming (tracks 2–4, 9–12), editing (track 13)
- Deadmau5 – production (track 5), mixing (track 5)
- Vishal–Shekhar – production (track 8)
- Nick Ryan – production (track 14)
- Kelly Snook – miscellaneous production (tracks 7–8), recording (tracks 1, 13), technical management
- Simon Heyworth – mastering (tracks 1, 7–8, 13–14)
- Alexander Goodman – recording (tracks 1, 13)
- Michael Lebor – recording (tracks 1, 13)
- Ben Henretig – recording (tracks 4, 11)
- Peter Stoddard – recording (tracks 4, 11)
- Gesha Zhu – recording (track 13)
- Hedley Dindoyal – recording (track 13)
- Rob Thomas – programming (track 10)
- Andy Miles – assistant engineering (tracks 1, 7–8, 13–14)
- Pang Wei – translation (track 13)

Design

- Andy Carne – art direction, cover photo, photography, photo manipulation
- Aurora Crowley – photography
- Thomas Erroson – photography
- Ene Fune – photography
- Alexander Goodman – photography
- Imogen Heap – photography
- Roman L – photography
- Jennifer Winter Torres – photography
- Joup Van Der Velde – photography
- Gesha Zhu – photography
- Cecilie Kamp – illustrations
