= Canvas (song) =

Song by Imogen Heap

from the album Ellipse
- Released: 17 July 2009
- Genre: Electronica
- Length: 4:52
- Label: Megaphonic Records
- Songwriter(s): Imogen Heap
- Producer(s): Imogen Heap

Music video
- "Canvas" on YouTube

"Canvas" is a song by British singer/songwriter Imogen Heap from her album Ellipse.

== Premiere ==
The music video for "Canvas" premiered on MSN Video on 17 July 2009. It was also made available for download in exchange for one tweet five days later on 22 July on Imogen Heap's Twitter.

== Release ==
"Canvas" was meant to be released only as a music video and never as a single. It was also never released on TV. Heap stated it would be a treat for her fans who waited so long for new material.

== Music video ==
A scene from 'Canvas' video.

The idea for a music video for "Canvas" formed back in February 2009. Heap asked her fans on Twitter if they could suggest a place where hills, snow, and sea meet together and stated it's for a "Canvas" video. The video was directed by Tom Kelly and filmed in Bonavista, Newfoundland and Labrador, Canada. It portrays a man walking through woods, snowy landscapes, and hills carrying an easel with a black canvas put on it. At the end of the video he ends up on a mountaintop where he lays down the easel and looks ahead. The shooting began in the first week of April 2009. Post-production lasted longer than expected.
