= Ellipse (album) =

Studio album by Imogen Heap
- Released: 24 August 2009
- Recorded: March 2007 – June 2009
- Genres: Electropop; art pop; experimental pop; electronica
- Length: 48:43
- Labels: Megaphonic; RCA; Epic; Sony BMG
- Producer: Imogen Heap

Imogen Heap chronology
Speak for Yourself (2005)	Ellipse (2009)	Sparks (2014)

Singles from Ellipse
- 1. "First Train Home" Released: 14 July 2009

Ellipse is the third studio album from British singer-songwriter Imogen Heap. After returning from a round the world writing trip, Heap completed the album at her childhood home in Essex, converting her old playroom in the basement into a studio. The album got its name from the distinctive elliptical shape of the house. The album's title was confirmed by Heap via her Twitter page on 25 April 2009, after being leaked onto the internet on 23 April. On 15 June, Heap confirmed that the album would be released on 24 August 2009 in the United Kingdom on Megaphonic Records and 25 August in North America on RCA Records and Epic Records and distributed by Sony BMG.

== Background ==
The album's title is taken from Heap's elliptical-shaped home in Essex, England wherein she began work on the project. The album's artwork was created using pictures from Flickr taken by fans. She composed and wrote all of the songs on the album prior to recording them in the studio, and recorded all of the vocals for the album in one month. During the making of the album, she frequently uploaded early studio mixes of its songs online in order to receive feedback from fans.

In July 2009, a promotional copy of the album (designed by Andy Hau) appeared on eBay; Heap in return placed a bid of £10,000,000 to try to reclaim the album, which eBay rejected. As of 8 July, eBay had ended the auction. On 14 July, the first single "First Train Home" was released, and a digital pre-order for the album became available on iTunes in two versions.

The deluxe version includes instrumental tracks of the entire album. Both standard and deluxe editions feature a "Behind the scenes" video when pre-ordered. As the song "The Fire" is already an instrumental, the "instrumental" version on the Deluxe edition's second disc consists of just the crackling fire in the background of the song proper. The solo piano track, without the fire sounds, was included only on the Deluxe CD copy of the album, as a hidden track at the end of "Half Life"; digital copies omit this hidden track.

In Japan, the song "Not Now, But Soon" from the Heroes soundtrack was included as a bonus track.

== Composition ==
Many of the songs on Ellipse sample sounds recorded from around Heap's house, including the sound of water hitting the kitchen sink, a jack-in-the-box, and a banister.

The song "Swoon" features a theremin-like sound, inspired by a tweet from a fan suggesting that she include a theremin on the album. The instrumentation of "Tidal" includes a pitched-down flute played by Ashwin Srinivasan, acoustic guitar played by Heap, synths, and a Game Boy made into a makeshift keyboard by Heap's friend. The song also features vocals from Srinivasan.

== Critical reception ==
Professional ratings
Review scores
Source	Rating
AllMusic	4/5 stars
The A.V. Club	C
Billboard	3.5/5
The Boston Globe	Favourable
The Daily Telegraph	2/4 stars
The Guardian	4/5 stars
Paste	8.0/10
PopMatters	7/10 stars
Slant	4/5 stars
Sputnikmusic	3.5/5 stars

Critical response to Ellipse was generally positive. At Metacritic, which assigns a normalized rating out of 100 to reviews from mainstream critics, the album received an average score of 68, based on 12 reviews. It also earned her a further two Grammy Nominations on 2 December for Best Pop Instrumental Performance for "The Fire" and Best Engineered Non-Classical Album. On 31 January 2010, it was announced that Heap had won the latter award.

== Commercial performance ==
Ellipse debuted at number 5 on the Billboard 200 chart and spent a total of 9 weeks on the chart, while also debuting at number 4 on the Billboard Canadian Albums chart and spending a total of 2 weeks on that chart. She also earned three more top 5 entries (including a chart topping entry) in other Billboard charts

As of 2011, the album had sold 161,000 copies in the United States. The album sold 48,025 copies worldwide in its first week, which is the most copies Imogen has sold in a singular week.

== Live performances ==
In October 2008, Heap travelled to America to perform at Pop!Tech in Camden, Maine. She performed the song 'Wait It Out' live, for the first time ever on 24 October. The performance was recorded and released on Youtube.com the following day.

On 24 August 2009, Heap appeared on the Late Show with David Letterman (although the episode didn't air until the 28th) and performed "First Train Home". On her Twitter page, Imogen admitted that she messed up on the second line of the second verse during the performance.

The following day, on 25 August, Imogen headed to the WNYC Radio Station in New York to play "First Train Home" and "Half Life" on air and give a short interview.

== Track listing ==
All tracks are written by and produced by Imogen Heap, except where noted.

Standard edition (Disc 1)
No.	Title	Writer(s)	Length
1.	"First Train Home"		4:13
2.	"Wait It Out"		3:57
3.	"Earth"		3:34
4.	"Little Bird"		4:07
5.	"Swoon"		3:54
6.	"Tidal"		3:50
7.	"Between Sheets"	Imogen Heap; Christiaan Virant; Zhang Jian	2:54
8.	"2-1"		4:42
9.	"Bad Body Double"		4:07
10.	"Aha!"		2:27
11.	"The Fire"		1:59
12.	"Canvas"		4:55
13.	"Half Life"		4:02
Total length:			48:41

Japanese bonus track
No.	Title	Length
14.	"Not Now But Soon"	3:46
Total length:		52:27

Deluxe edition (Disc 2)
No.	Title	Length
1.	"First Train Home" (instrumental)	4:15
2.	"Wait It Out" (instrumental)	3:47
3.	"Earth" (instrumental)	3:35
4.	"Little Bird" (instrumental)	4:08
5.	"Swoon" (instrumental)	3:52
6.	"Tidal" (instrumental)	3:51
7.	"Between Sheets" (instrumental)	2:55
8.	"2-1" (instrumental)	4:43
9.	"Bad Body Double" (instrumental)	4:07
10.	"Aha!" (instrumental)	2:27
11.	"The Fire" ("instrumental")	1:57
12.	"Canvas" (instrumental)	4:55
13.	"Half Life" (instrumental) / "The Fire" (piano instrumental; only on CD pressing)	6:13
Total length:		1:39:26

iTunes exclusive pre-order video
No.	Title	Length
14.	"Behind the Scenes with Imogen"	4:07

== Personnel ==
Credits adapted from Tidal.

- Imogen Heap – vocals, production, mixing, engineering, programming
- Ashwin Srinivasan – background vocals (track 6), flute (track 6)
- Leo Abrahams – electric guitar (tracks 2, 6)
- David Daniels—electric guitar (track 6)
- Oli Langford – violin (tracks 2, 6, 9–10, 12–13)
- Ian Burdge – cello (tracks 6, 8, 10, 12–13)
- Richie Mills – drums (tracks 6, 9)
- Arve Henriksen – trumpet (tracks 8, 13)
- Simon Heyworth – mastering

=== Production ===
- Jennie Hancock – projection production
- Ewan Robertson – projection production
- Andy Hau – logo
- Mark Wood – management
- Richard Bull – design
- Annelieke Bosdijk – projections
- Albert Q Bui – projections
- Jessica Butler – projections
- Alex Carmichal – projections
- Randall Dameron – projections
- J. Daniel Geddis – projections
- Vladislav Gusarov – projections
- Adriane Lake – projections
- Nick Moulakis – projections
- Nathan Nye – projections
- Michelle Thomas – projections
- Jeremy Cowart – photography

== Charts ==
=== Weekly charts ===
Chart (2009)	Peak position
Canadian Albums (Billboard)	4
Scottish Albums (Official Charts)	64
UK Albums (Official Charts)	39
US Billboard 200	5
US Top Dance Albums (Billboard)	1
US Top Rock Albums (Billboard)	4
US Top Alternative Albums (Billboard)	3

=== Year-end charts ===
Chart (2009)	Position
US Top Dance/Electronic Albums (Billboard)	7
Chart (2010)	Position
US Top Dance/Electronic Albums (Billboard)	17

== Release history ==
Country	Date
United Kingdom	24 August 2009
France, Asia (except Japan)	25 August 2009
Canada, Mexico, Japan	2 September 2009
Germany, Switzerland, Austria, Ireland, New Zealand, South Africa, Denmark, Finland, Norway, Sweden, Czech Republic, Italy, Benelux, Greece	14 September 2009
Poland	28 September 2009
Hungary, Australia	19 February 2010
