= David Treahearn =

English record producer and songwriter

- Genres: Rock; pop; electronic
- Occupations: Songwriter; musician; record producer; programmer; recording engineer; mix engineer
- Instruments: Vocals; guitar; piano; keyboards; drums; bass
- Years active: 2000–present
- Label: EMI

David Treahearn is an English songwriter, musician, record producer, programmer, recording and mix engineer based in Richmond upon Thames, England.

Treahearn is credited on more than 90 international commercial music releases as mix engineer, composer, musician and assistant with some of the world's most successful artists including Madonna, The Black Eyed Peas, Oasis, Björk, Britney Spears, Gwen Stefani, Depeche Mode, Elbow, Massive Attack, Kylie Minogue, Darren Hayes, Linkin Park, No Doubt, Dave Matthews, Keane, New Order, Janet Jackson, Natasha Bedingfield, Marilyn Manson, Girls Aloud, The Spice Girls and Turin Brakes.

Treahearn began his music career at Olympic Studios in London in January 2000, where he worked until 2007 as an assistant engineer to international producer and mixer Mark 'Spike' Stent. He also worked out of major London and Los Angeles recording studios including Abbey Road, Metropolis, The Town House, Westlake, Ocean Way and Henson with Stent and other renowned producers including Mirwais Ahmadzaï, Stuart Price, Richard 'Biff' Stannard, Dallas Austin and Ash Howes.

In 2005, Treahearn worked with French record producer Mirwais Ahmadzaï, whom he had previously worked with on Madonna's American Life album, to mix the Fischerspooner track "We Need a War" from the album Odyssey. Between 2005 and 2007 he also provided programming, keyboards, engineering and mixing on projects for Alex Parks, Lee Ryan, Girls Aloud, Nelly Furtado, The Spice Girls and Sugababes. Between 2006 and 2008, Treahearn co-wrote and produced two albums in the 'Popstyles' series for the Cavendish Music library of specialist UK publisher Boosey & Hawkes. The track "Ice Cream" from Popstyles 1 was used as a featured song in Hong Kong's high-rating TV series, Moonlight Resonance, and featured on the Asian Sony/BMG 2008 double CD compilation, Strawberry Love, alongside Whitney Houston, Avril Lavigne, Britney Spears and Christina Aguilera.

In 2007, Treahearn and his music partner Rob Haggett formed The Slips. Between 2011 and 2012, after relocating to Australia, the duo signed to EMI Music Australia, and produced collaborations with local artists.

In 2008, Treahearn worked with US record producer and songwriter Robert Conley, whom he had worked with at Olympic Studios, to mix Australian artist Axle Whitehead's debut album Losing Sleep. The lead track taken from the album, "I Don't Do Surprises", was a top 10 ARIA chart hit and was shortlisted in 2009 by APRA Music Awards for "Most Played Australian Work". That year he was credited alongside Gary Barlow on the soundtrack to the UK musical TV series Britannia High. In 2009, Treahearn worked again with French producer Mirwais Ahmadzaï, co-writing and co-producing the track "Da" for French-Arabic project Y.A.S. on the debut album, Arabology.

In 2010, Treahearn worked with Biffco in the UK on the ITV network The X Factor series 7, produced by FremantleMedia's Thames and Simon Cowell's production company SYCOtv. He was credited with providing engineering on the UK number-one single "Heroes" by The X Factor Finalists.

During 2012, The Slips' remix for Björk’s track "Moon" from her album Biophilia was included on her remix album Bastards.

Treahearn has also been credited as a music engineer and mixer on advertising campaigns, music videos and documentaries, for artists such as Oasis, Janet Jackson, Britney Spears and Depeche Mode.

== Discography ==
=== Selected Artist Credits ===
Year	Artist	Title	Type	No. of songs	Songs	Credit	Label	Awards and achievements	Notes	Ref.
2001	Björk	Vespertine	Album	14	All tracks	Assistant engineer	One Little Indian	Grammy nomination – Best Alternative Music Album (2002)	2 notes: "Mother Heroic" – B-side of "Hidden Place" single; "Foot Soldier" – B-side of "Hidden Place" single	
2001	New Order	Get Ready	Album	1	"Close Range"	Assistant producer, editor	London Records	—	—	
2001	No Doubt	Rock Steady	Album	13	All tracks	Assistant engineer	Interscope Records	Grammy Awards and nominations: Grammy Award – Best Pop Performance by a Duo or Group with Vocal, "Hey Baby" (2003); Grammy Award – Best Pop Performance by a Duo or Group with Vocal, "Underneath It All" (2004); Grammy nominations – Best Pop Vocal Album; Best Dance Recording ("Hella Good") (2003)	—	
2001	Oasis	10 Years of Noise and Confusion	TV special	1	—	Sound assistant	—	—	—	
2001	Skinny	"Coming Up Roses"	Single	1	—	Assistant engineer	Cheeky Records	—	—	
2001	Victoria Beckham	Victoria Beckham	Album	3	3 songs: "A Mind Of Its Own"; "Like That"; "I.O.U."	Assistant engineer	Virgin	—	—	
2002	Amy Studt	False Smiles	Album	1	"Just A Little Girl"	Assistant engineer	19 / Polydor	—	—	
2002	Craig Armstrong	As If to Nothing	Album	4	4 songs: "Wake Up In New York"; "Inhaler"; "Snow"; "Sea Song"	Assistant engineer	Melankolic	—	—	
2002	Craig David	Slicker Than Your Average	Album	4	4 songs: "You Don't Miss Your Water ('Til The Well Runs Dry)"; "Hands Up In The Air"; "Spanish"; "World Filled With Love"	Assistant engineer	Wildstar Records	—	—	
2002	Gemma Hayes	Night on My Side	Album	5	5 songs: "Hanging Around"; "Back Of My Hand"; "Over & Over"; "Let A Good Thing Go"; "I Wanna Stay"	Mix engineer, assistant engineer	Source	Mercury Music Prize nomination (2002)	—	
2002	Linkin Park	Reanimation	Album	20	All tracks	Assistant engineer	Warner Bros. Records	—	—	
2002	Madonna	Die Another Day: Music from the Motion Picture	Album	1	"Die Another Day"	Assistant engineer	Warner Bros. Records	Golden Globe nomination · Grammy nominations: Golden Globe nomination – Best Original Song, "Die Another Day" (2003); Grammy nominations – Best Dance Recording; Best Short Form Music Video, "Die Another Day" (2004)	—	
2002	Oasis	Heathen Chemistry	Album	12	All tracks	Engineer, assistant engineer	Big Brother	UK No. 1 album	1 note: "My Generation" – B-side of "Little By Little / She Is Love" single	
2003	Appleton	"Sugarman"	Single	1	—	Assistant engineer	Polydor	—	—	
2003	Britney Spears	In the Zone	Album	2	"Me Against The Music", "Touch Of My Hand"	Assistant engineer	Jive	—	—	
2003	Clarkesville	"Secret File"	Single	1	—	Assistant engineer	Wildstar Records	—	—	
2003	Dave Matthews	Some Devil	Album	13	All tracks	Assistant engineer	RCA	Grammy Award – Best Male Rock Vocal Performance, "Gravedigger" (2004)	—	
2003	Ed Harcourt	Watching The Sun Come Up: Australian Tour EP	EP	1	"Watching The Sun Come Up"	Assistant engineer	Heavenly	—	—	
2003	Edyta Górniak	Invisible	Album	1	"Impossible"	Assistant engineer	Virgin	—	—	
2003	Kylie Minogue	Body Language	Album	1	"Slow Motion"	Assistant engineer	Parlophone	—	—	
2003	Madonna	American Life	Album	10	10 songs: "American Life"; "Hollywood"; "I'm So Stupid"; "Love Profusion"; "Nobody Knows Me"; "Nothing Fails"; "Intervention"; "X-Static Process"; "Mother And Father"; "Easy Ride"	Assistant engineer	Maverick	UK No. 1 album	4 notes: "American Life - Peter Rauhofer's American Anthem, Pt. 1" – remix; "American Life - Peter Rauhofer's American Anthem, Pt. 2" – remix; "Nobody Knows Me (Peter Rauhofer's Private Life Pt. 1)" – remix; "Nothing Fails (Jackie's In Love In The Club)" – remix	
2003	Massive Attack	100th Window	Album	10	All tracks	Assistant engineer	Virgin	UK No. 1 album	—	
2003	Wheatus	Hand Over Your Loved Ones	Album	10	All tracks	Assistant engineer	Columbia	—	—	
2004	Basement Jaxx	"Plug It In"	Single	1	—	Assistant engineer	Astralwerks	—	Versions: Radio Edit	
2004	Björk	Medúlla	Album	14	All tracks	Assistant engineer	One Little Indian	Grammy nominations – Best Alternative Music Album; Best Female Pop Vocal Performance ("Oceania") (2005)	—	
2004	Black Eyed Peas	"Let's Get It Started"	Single	1	—	Assistant engineer	A&M Records	Grammy Award – Best Rap Performance by a Duo or Group (2005); nominated for Record of the Year	Versions: Spike Mix	
2004	Darren Hayes	The Tension and the Spark	Album	14	All tracks	Assistant engineer	Columbia	—	—	
2004	Depeche Mode	"Enjoy the Silence 04"	Single	1	—	Assistant engineer	Mute	—	—	
2004	Elbow	"Not a Job"	Single	1	—	Assistant engineer	V2	—	Versions: Edit, Radio Edit	
2004	Gabrielle	Play to Win	Album	1	"Stay The Same"	Mix engineer	Island Records	—	—	
2004	Gwen Stefani	Love. Angel. Music. Baby.	Album	8	8 songs: "What You Waiting For?"; "Cool"; "Luxurious"; "Harajuku Girls"; "Crash"; "The Real Thing"; "Serious"; "Danger Zone"	Engineer, assistant engineer	Interscope Records	Grammy nominations: Grammy nominations – Album of the Year; Best Pop Vocal Album (2006); Grammy nomination – Best Female Pop Vocal Performance, "What You Waiting For?" (2005)	—	
2004	Janet Jackson	Damita Jo	Album	5	4 songs: "Island Life"; "All Nite (Don't Stop)"; "SloLove"; "Just A Little While"	Assistant engineer	Virgin	Grammy nomination – Best Contemporary R&B Album (2005)	1 note: "Put Your Hands On" – B-side of "All Nite (Don't Stop)" single	
2004	Keane	Hopes and Fears	Album	17	All tracks	Assistant engineer	Island Records	UK No. 1 · BRIT Award · Ivor Novello nomination: UK No. 1 album; BRIT Award – British Album (2005); Ivor Novello Award nomination – Best Song Musically and Lyrically, "Everybody's Changing" (2005)	5 notes: "Into The Light" – demo, Deluxe Edition; "Snowed Under" – B-side of "Somewhere Only We Know" single; "Walnut Tree" – B-side of "Somewhere Only We Know" single; "Allemande" – B-side of "This Is The Last Time" single; "Bend & Break (Basto vs. Keane)" – remix	
2004	Marilyn Manson	"Personal Jesus"	Single	1	—	Assistant engineer	Interscope Records	—	Versions: LP Version	
2004	Natasha Bedingfield	Unwritten	Album	8	8 songs: "These Words"; "Single"; "Unwritten"; "Silent Movie"; "I Bruise Easily"; "If You're Gonna..."; "Drop Me In The Middle"; "Size Matters"	Assistant engineer	Epic	UK No. 1 · Grammy nomination · Ivor Novello nomination: UK No. 1 album; UK No. 1 single, "These Words"; Grammy nomination – Best Female Pop Vocal Performance, "Unwritten" (2007); Ivor Novello Award nomination – Best Song Musically and Lyrically, "These Words" (2005)	—	
2005	Alex Parks	Honesty	Album	6	6 songs: "Lie"; "Looking For Water"; "So Emotional"; "Get Out"; "Honesty"; "From The Inside"	Engineer	Polydor	—	—	
2005	Bob Marley & the Wailers	"Slogans"	Single	1	—	Assistant engineer	Tuff Gong	—	—	
2005	Craig David	The Story Goes...	Album	11	11 songs: "All The Way"; "Don't Love You No More (I'm Sorry)"; "Hypnotic"; "Separate Ways"; "Johnny"; "Do You Believe In Love"; "One Last Dance"; "Just Chillin'"; "Thief In The Night"; "Never Should Have Walked Away"; "Let Her Go"	Assistant engineer	Warner Bros. Records	—	—	
2005	Fischerspooner	Odyssey	Album	1	"We Need A War"	Mix engineer, engineer	Capitol Records	—	—	
2005	Geri Halliwell	Passion	Album	1	"Love Never Loved Me"	Engineer	Innocent	—	—	
2005	Juliet	Random Order	Album	4	4 songs: "Ride The Pain"; "On The Dancefloor"; "Waiting"; "Would You Mind"	Assistant engineer	Virgin	—	—	
2005	Lee Ryan	Lee Ryan	Album	11	11 songs: "Army Of Lovers"; "Turn Your Car Around"; "When I Think Of You"; "Real Love"; "Wish The Whole World Knew"; "Close To You"; "Miss My Everything"; "Daydreamer"; "Jump"; "How Do I?"; "In The Morning"	Programmer + 3 more: Programmer; keyboards; drums; engineer	Brightside Recordings	—	—	
2005	Liberty X	X	Album	2	"Divine Intervention", "X"	Mix engineer	—	—	—	
2005	Sara Jorge	"Dirty Business"	Single	1	—	Keyboards	—	—	Versions: Original Radio Edit	
2005	Simon Webbe	Sanctuary	Album	2	"Lay Your Hands", "Free"	Engineer, assistant engineer	Innocent	—	—	
2005	Turin Brakes	Jackinabox	Album	13	All tracks	Assistant engineer	Source	—	—	
2005	Wang Leehom	Heroes of Earth	Album	2	"Kiss Goodbye", "哥兒們"	Assistant engineer	Sony BMG	—	—	
2006	Ayọ	Joyful	Album	1	"Down On My Knees"	Drums	—	—	—	
2006	Girls Aloud	"Whole Lotta History"	Single	1	—	Mix engineer	Polydor	—	Versions: Ash Howes Mix	
2006	Keane	Under the Iron Sea	Album	5	4 songs: "Atlantic"; "Is It Any Wonder?"; "Hamburg Song"; "Put It Behind You"	Assistant engineer	Island Records	UK No. 1 · Grammy nomination: UK No. 1 album; Grammy nomination – Best Pop Performance by a Duo or Group with Vocal, "Is It Any Wonder?" (2007)	1 note: "He Used To Be A Lovely Boy" – B-side of "Is It Any Wonder?" single	
2006	Love Bites	"Oi Oi"	Single	1	—	Engineer	Island Records	—	—	
2006	Nelly Furtado	Loose	Album	1	"In God's Hands"	Keyboards	—	—	—	
2006	Robin Thicke	The Evolution of Robin Thicke	Album	1	"Lost Without U"	Drums	—	—	—	
2006	Simon Webbe	Grace	Album	7	6 songs: "Coming Around Again"; "Seventeen"; "Sunshine (Love Like That)"; "Go To Sleep"; "Don't Wanna Be That Man"; "Grace"	Engineer, assistant engineer	Innocent	—	1 note: "Whatever Gets You Through The Night" – B-side of "Coming Around Again" single	
2007	Darren Hayes	This Delicate Thing We've Made	Album	25	All tracks	Assistant engineer	Powdered Sugar	—	—	
2007	Electrovamp	"I Don't Like The Vibe In The V.I.P."	Single	1	—	Remixer	Island Records Group	—	Versions: The Slips Remix	
2007	Karen Louise	"Falling"	Single	1	—	Engineer	Starfisch Records	—	1 note: Versions: 7th Heaven Club Mix, 7th Heaven Radio Remix, Radio Edit, Riffs & Rays Club Mix, Riffs & Rays Radio Mix	
2007	Laura Critchley	"Tell Me"	Track	1	—	Keyboards	—	—	—	
2007	Siobhán Donaghy	Ghosts	Album	11	All tracks	Assistant engineer	Parlophone	—	—	
2007	Spice Girls	Greatest Hits	Album	1	"Voodoo"	Keyboards, engineer	—	—	—	
2007	Spice Girls	"Headlines (Friendship Never Ends)"	Single	1	—	Keyboards, engineer	Virgin	—	Versions: Radio Version	
2007	Sugababes	Change	Album	1	"Undignified"	Keyboards	—	UK No. 1 album	—	
2007	Sunny Day Sets Fire	Stranger Remix EP	EP	1	"Stranger"	Remixer	IAmSound Records	—	As The Slips	
2008	Axle Whitehead	Losing Sleep	Album	9	9 songs: "Satellite"; "I Don't Do Surprises"; "Over To You Now"; "Face The Music"; "Losing Sleep"; "Waiting For Something To Happen"; "Maybe I Was Wrong"; "Way Home"; "Free Man"	Mix engineer	Roadshow Music	APRA Award nomination – Most Played Australian Work, "I Don't Do Surprises" (2009)	—	
2008	CSS	"Music Is My Hot Hot Sex"	Single	1	—	Remixer	IAmSound Records	—	Versions: The Slips Remix	
2008	OneRepublic	"Mercy"	Single	1	—	Programmer, engineer	Interscope Records	—	Versions: Radio Mix	
2008	Public Service Announcers	"Money Blind"	Single	1	—	Remixer	Bad Box Records	—	Versions: The Slips Remix	
2008	Sandi Thom	The Pink & the Lily	Album	1	"The Pink and the Lily"	Keyboards	—	—	—	
2008	The Lodger	"The Good Old Days"	Single	1	—	Remixer	Bad Sneakers Records	—	Versions: The Slips Remix	
2008	Tom Jones	24 Hours	Album	1	"Give A Little Love"	Engineer	—	—	—	
2008	Will Young	Let It Go	Album	2	"Grace", "This Is Who I Am"	Engineer	—	—	—	
2009	The Death Kit	Loser E.P.	EP	1	"Beetlebum"	Remixer	Big & Dirty	—	As The Slips	
2009	Y.A.S.	Arabology	Album	1	"Da"	Songwriter + 3 more: Songwriter; producer; programmer; engineer	AZ	—	—	
2010	Bertie Blackman	"Peek-A-Boo"	Single	1	—	Remixer	Forum 5	—	Versions: The Slips Remix	
2010	Phrase	"Never Fade"	Single	1	—	Remixer	Marlin Records	—	Versions: The Slips Remix	
2010	The X Factor Finalists 2010	"Heroes"	Single	1	—	Programmer, engineer	Syco Music	UK No. 1 single	Versions: Stripped Mix	
2011	Faker	Get Loved	Album	8	8 songs: "Dangerous"; "Heaven Will Wait"; "Graffiti On The Skyline"; "Downtown Monster Squad"; "Long Forgotten Town"; "Love Survival Guide"; "How We Survive"; "B1nary Man"	Mix engineer	—	—	—	
2011	Faker	How Did We Not Get Loved? EP	EP	5	All tracks	Mix engineer	Capitol Records	—	—	
2011	Flight Facilities	"Foreign Language"	Compilation	1	—	Remixer	Ministry of Sound	—	Versions: The Slips Remix	
2012	Björk	Bastards	Album	1	"Moon"	Remixer	One Little Indian	—	As The Slips	
2012	Colour Coding	Proof	EP	5	All tracks	Mix engineer	Inertia Access	—	—	
2012	Colour Coding	Proof (Remixed)	Remix EP	1	"Hold Tight"	Remixer	Inertia Access	—	As The Slips	
2012	The Scientists Of Modern Music	A Personal Universe	Album	12	All tracks	Mix engineer, engineer	Rubber Records	—	—	
2012	The Slips	"Make It Out Alright"	Single	1	—	Artist, songwriter	EMI Music Australia	—	As The Slips	
2013	Tina Arena	You Set Fire to My Life	Remix EP	1	"You Set Fire To My Life"	Remixer	EMI	—	As The Slips	
2013	周文韾 (Chow Wen-Hsin)	"就這樣站到明天"	Track	1	—	Songwriter, producer, programmer	—	—	—	
2024	The Slips	The Slips	Album	13	All tracks	Artist, songwriter, keyboards	self-released	—	As The Slips	
2024	The Slips	Kentish Town	Album	10	All tracks	Artist, songwriter, keyboards	self-released	—	As The Slips	
2025	The Slips	16.9k	Album	10	All tracks	Artist, songwriter	self-released	—	As The Slips	

=== Selected Production Music Credits ===
Year	Album	Type	No. of tracks	Songs	Library	Cat. no.	Co-writers	Notes	Ref.
2005	"Drift Away"	Track	1	—	—	—	Rob Haggett + 1 more: Rob Haggett; Andrew Nicholas Love	—	
2006	"December"	Track	1	—	—	—	Rob Haggett, Mika Sun Black	—	
2006	PopStyles	Album	12	All tracks	Cavendish Music	CAV CD 226	Rob Haggett	1 note: "Ice Cream" used as a featured song in the TVB series Moonlight Resonance (2008) and included on the Sony BMG compilation Strawberry Love	
2007	"Home"	Track	1	—	—	—	Jasmine Baird, Rob Haggett	—	
2007	"The Calling"	Track	1	—	—	—	Georgie Jane Dennis + 1 more: Georgie Jane Dennis; Rob Haggett	—	
2008	PopStyles 2	Album	15	All tracks	Cavendish Music	CAV CD 247	Rob Haggett + 5 more: Rob Haggett; Ciara Newell; Cathy Newell; Finn Vilsbak Sorensen; Jemimah Barnett; Rebecca Hayes	—	
2008	Remix Orchestral/Electronic	Album	2	"Perpetual Motion", "Missing"	Cavendish Music	CAV CD 244/5	Paul Jeremy Mottram + 2 more: Paul Jeremy Mottram; Rob Haggett; Gabriel Currington	—	
2008	Teen Party	Album	1	"Rock Boxes"	Atmosphere	ATMOS-CD246	Rob Haggett	—	
2009	Alternative Beats Vol 1	Album	2	"Fallen Over", "Blue Submarine"	Felt Music	FMLARC0009	Rob Haggett	—	
2009	Alternative Beats Vol 2	Album	7	7 songs: "With the Lights Out"; "The Morocco Accordion"; "She's Not the Same"; "Break It Up"; "String Flutters"; "R U"; "Enough to Have You"	Felt Music	FMLARC0079	Rob Haggett	—	
2009	"Cool Cool"	Track	1	—	Felt Licensing Limited	—	Rob Haggett	—	
2009	Dance in the Dark	Album	1	"Small Grey Boxes"	Felt Music	FMLARC0077	Rob Haggett	—	
2009	Electro House Vol 1	Album	1	"Rainbow"	Felt Music	FMLFC0007	Rob Haggett	—	
2009	Electro Pop Vol 1	Album	7	7 songs: "Work It Out"; "Push Push"; "Gravity"; "God Knows Where the Lonely Girls Go"; "Broken Wires"; "Brand New Day"; "All I Gotta Give"	Felt Music	FMLFC0016	Rob Haggett	—	
2009	Electro Pop Vol 2	Album	2	"DNA", "Sunday"	Felt Music	FMLFC0017	Rob Haggett	—	
2009	Electro Poppers	Album	1	"Basement"	Felt Music	FMLARC0027	Rob Haggett	—	
2009	Elettronica Vol 2	Album	2	"Dirt Fuzz", "Confident"	Felt Music	FMLARC0065	Rob Haggett	—	
2009	Fashion and Lifestyle	Album	1	"Work Me"	Felt Music	FMLTH0007	Rob Haggett	—	
2009	Funk It Up Vol 2	Album	1	"Jam Down"	Felt Music	FMLARC0102	Rob Haggett	—	
2009	Groovy Floorfillers Vol 2	Album	1	"Tell It Like It Is"	Felt Music	FMLARC0030	Rob Haggett	—	
2009	Hip Hop Edgy Beats	Album	5	5 songs: "Freeze"; "Mess It Up"; "Take It Off"; "Les Guitars"; "Roadside"	Felt Music	FMLARC0074	Rob Haggett	—	
2009	Indie Poppers Vol 2	Album	1	"Responsible"	Felt Music	FMLARC0057	Rob Haggett	—	
2009	Inspiration Station Vol 1	Album	1	"Living for a Change"	Felt Music	FMLARC0070	Rob Haggett	—	
2009	"Minute By Minute"	Track	1	—	—	—	Julie Steincke, Rob Haggett	—	
2009	Odd Ball Beats Vol 1	Album	1	"The Boom"	Felt Music	FMLARC0103	Rob Haggett	—	
2009	Riffers	Album	1	"Turnaround"	Felt Music	FMLARC0137	Rob Haggett	—	
2009	"Shake It Up"	Track	1	—	Felt Licensing Limited	—	Rob Haggett	—	
2009	Signal Interference Vol 1	Album	1	"Don't Fake This"	Felt Music	FMLARC0002	Rob Haggett	—	
2009	Sit Down Sounds Vol 1	Album	1	"Tell Me"	Felt Music	FMLARC0107	Rob Haggett	—	
2009	Storytellin' Blues	Album	1	"Vibe Out"	Felt Music	FMLARC0005	Rob Haggett	—	
2010	"Bats in the Beatbox"	Track	1	—	Headlock Music Uk	—	Rob Haggett	—	
2010	"Brain Dance"	Track	1	—	Headlock Music Uk	—	Rob Haggett	—	
2010	"Breed Apart"	Track	1	—	Headlock Music Uk	—	Rob Haggett	—	
2010	"Buzzsaw Bizzness"	Track	1	—	Headlock Music Uk	—	Rob Haggett	—	
2010	"Cummin Atcha"	Track	1	—	Headlock Music Uk	—	Rob Haggett	—	
2010	"Double Dare"	Track	1	—	Headlock Music Uk	—	Rob Haggett	—	
2010	Experiments In Bass	Album	2	"Never Too Late", "Chase Down"	Chappell	CHAP 370	Rob Haggett	—	
2010	"Eye 2 Eye"	Track	1	—	Headlock Music Uk	—	Rob Haggett	—	
2010	"Feeding Frenzy"	Track	1	—	Headlock Music Uk	—	Rob Haggett	—	
2010	"Future Fiasco"	Track	1	—	Headlock Music Uk	—	Rob Haggett	—	
2010	"In the Slot"	Track	1	—	Headlock Music Uk	—	Rob Haggett	—	
2010	"Lost Reflections"	Track	1	—	Headlock Music Uk	—	Rob Haggett	—	
2010	"Nu World Machine"	Track	1	—	Headlock Music Uk	—	Rob Haggett	—	
2010	"Off the Beaten Track"	Track	1	—	Headlock Music Uk	—	Rob Haggett	—	
2010	"Organic Plateau"	Track	1	—	Headlock Music Uk	—	Rob Haggett	—	
2010	"Toxic Trace"	Track	1	—	Headlock Music Uk	—	Rob Haggett	—	
2011	Classics Remade - Tough & Dynamic	Album	2	"Cello Sweets", "Bruckbeats"	Cavendish Music	CAV CD 294	Anton Bruckner + 2 more: Anton Bruckner; Rob Haggett; Johann Sebastian Bach	—	
2011	Classics Remade CD 2: Atmospheric And Quirky	Album	1	"Canonised"	Cavendish Music	CAV CD 295	Johann Pachelbel + 1 more: Johann Pachelbel; Rob Haggett	—	
2011	Dubstep	Album	7	7 songs: "Dubstep"; "The Unstoppable"; "Disintegration"; "Critical Mass"; "Brain Melt"; "Take No Prisoners"; "War Zone"	West One Music	WOM 250	Rob Haggett + 3 more: Rob Haggett; Maximilian John Adelbert Ringham; Benjamin Tobias Franz Ringham; William Michael Mills	—	
2011	Glitz & Glamour	Album	2	"Time Of Your Life", "Money Hurts"	UPPM Records	—	Rob Haggett	—	
2012	Champion Sound - Songs About Winning, Vol 2	Album	2	"Learn to Win", "Everybody Come Together"	Cavendish Music Library	—	Rob Haggett	—	
2012	Electro Swing	Album	2	"What the Butler Saw", "Electro Fry"	Carlin Production Music	CAR 427	Harry Lubin + 3 more: Harry Lubin; Rob Haggett; Tim Walter; Nigel Peter Beaham-Powell	—	
2012	"Gym"	Track	1	—	Eclectic	—	Rob Haggett	—	
2012	Pop Styles 3	Album	15	15 songs: "Back to Mine"; "Call It"; "Dance All Night"; "Get Up Get Out"; "Home Town"; "I Won't Back Down"; "Just Take It"; "Lazer Pop"; "Rainy Day"; "Said Too Much"; "Sometimes"; "Stop Eject"; "Summers Gone"; "There Will Be An Answer"; "You're Not Alone"	Cavendish Music	CAVCD 337	Rob Haggett	—	
2013	"Bionic Addiction"	Track	1	—	Locked Heads Music	—	Rob Haggett	—	
2014	"Beat Root"	Track	1	—	Locked Heads Music	—	Rob Haggett	—	
2014	"Going Coastal"	Track	1	—	Locked Heads Music	—	Rob Haggett	—	
2016	Chillout Deluxe	Album	1	"A Natural Conclusion"	Felt Music	FMLFC0076	Rupert Vyvyan Kenrick Pope + 2 more: Rupert Vyvyan Kenrick Pope; Rob Haggett; Reece Gilmore	—	
2016	Dirty Electro	Album	14	14 songs: "Heading Your Way"; "Lethal Evidence"; "On the Same Wavelength"; "From Another Planet"; "Taking the Scenic Route"; "Imminent Disaster"; "Vanished View"; "Hounds in the Hotel"; "Chainsaw Cartel"; "Fuel Fever"; "The Wise Waltz"; "Falling in to Place"; "Ordered Outlook"; "Double Danger"	Felt Music	FMLFC0075	Reece Gilmore + 2 more: Reece Gilmore; Rupert Vyvyan Kenrick Pope; Rob Haggett	—	
2017	Tropical House	Album	2	"Breathe Out", "Fire Within"	CPM	CAR 499	Rob Haggett	—	
