= Robert Conley (music producer) =

American music producer (born 1973)

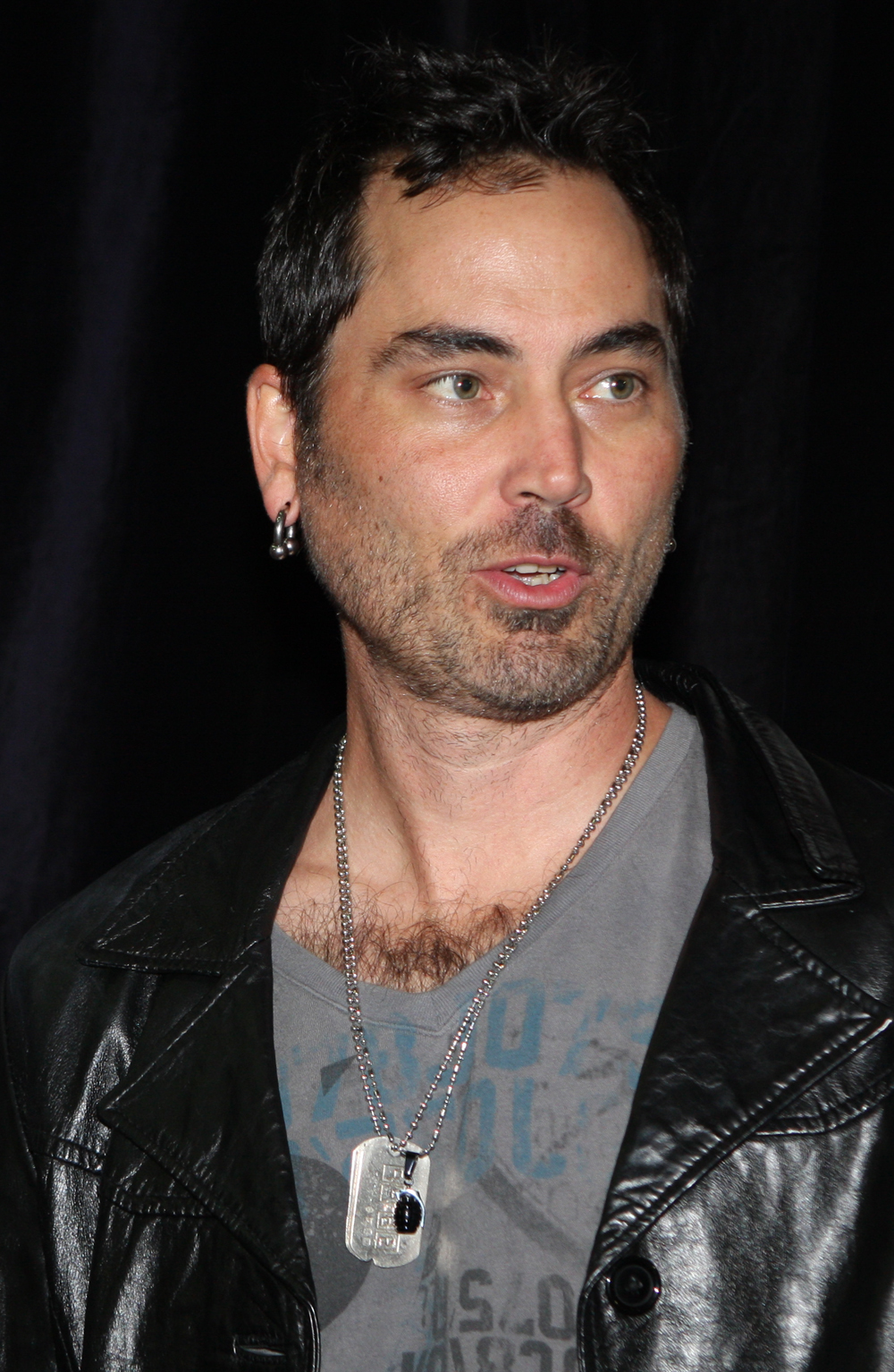
- Conley in 2013

Background information
- Born: March 13, 1973 (age 52); Portsmouth, New Hampshire, United States
- Genres: Pop, pop rock, electronica
- Occupations: Musician, record producer, songwriter
- Instrument: Synthesizer
- Years active: 1999–present
- Label: Specific Music

Robert Conley is an American songwriter, record producer, engineer, mixer, and music publisher. Throughout his career, he has worked across all genres of music and has collaborated, programmed, mixed, produced, and written with many artists, including Kiss, Destiny's Child, Carlos Santana, Justin Timberlake, Josh Groban, Celine Dion, Ricky Martin, Darren Hayes, Jessica Mauboy, Okenyo, Tina Arena, The Delta Riggs, The Walking Who, Ilan Kidron, Grinspoon, Georgi Kay, Thelma Plum, Lisa Mitchell, Bluejuice, and more.

== Early life ==
Robert Conley was born on March 13, 1973, in Portsmouth, New Hampshire, United States. He grew up in Harrison, Ohio, a suburb of Cincinnati, Ohio, the eldest of three boys. When he was in the tenth grade, his father bought him an Ensoniq VFX SD II, and he began to create his own sequences and songs. Conley graduated from William Henry Harrison High School in 1991 and briefly went to the University of Dayton before dropping out to make music. Conley moved to Chicago, Illinois, in 1992 and started an 'industrial' band called 'Darius Pogue' (the inspiration behind the 'dp' and 'dp13' aliases). The band played shows in and around Chicago. He then moved to Phoenix in 1997, where he started an electronica band called 'Specificus' with Matt Kelly (aka K. Roxwell, aka MK Ultra), making music influenced by The Chemical Brothers, The Crystal Method, Aphex Twin, and Squarepusher.

== Career ==
Conley and Kelly moved to Hollywood to pursue a career in engineering and programming in 1999. They both worked at the 'Tone King' recording studio, where the Kiss-Alive III album was mixed. While working on the Kiss album, the studio was visited by producer Walter Afanasieff and songwriter Robi 'Draco' Rosa, who were working on some new music for Ricky Martin. Conley's boss gave him the job of being a programmer and engineer for Afanasieff and Rosa for the day. Afanasieff was so impressed with Conley that he hired him on the spot and moved him to San Rafael, CA, to work in his world-class recording studio, 'Wally World'. Ricky Martin's She Bangs was the first song they worked on together.

During his time with Afanasieff, Robert Conley worked with many artists, one of whom was Darren Hayes. After working on the Spin album together, Hayes invited Conley's band 'Specificus' to support him on his Too Close for Comfort world tour. Upon returning from the tour, Conley and Hayes got together in San Francisco to work on Hayes' second solo album, The Tension and the Spark. The album was mixed by Mark Stent, and when it was completed, Conley and Hayes moved to the UK to promote the album, which was well received. After 18 months in the UK, Robert Conley returned to the US, moving to Phoenix, Arizona. While here, he reconnected with Matt Kelly and worked on some new tracks for 'Specificus'. He also teamed up with Australian songwriter and producer Vince Pizzinga to form another electronica duo, which they named The Beautiful Left. Conley also started on some new tracks, which would become the central theme to Darren Hayes' album This Delicate Thing We've Made.

In May 2007, Conley signed with Sony/ATV Music Publishing in Australia and moved to Sydney. He has worked as songwriter and producer for several up-and-coming Australian acts, including Axle Whitehead. Conley was instrumental in the development of Sydney band Amy Meredith, co-producing their debut album Restless and co-writing six songs from the album, including their breakthrough single Pornstar and their ARIA Top Ten hit, Lying. Conley also worked with Brian McFadden, co-writing and co-producing much of the Wall of Soundz album, including the ARIA Number One hit single Just Say So, the Christian Lo Russo/Brian McFadden collaboration Not Now, and the Delta Goodrem/Brian McFadden collaboration Mistakes. He has also collaborated with Australian hip-hop artist Phrase, co-writing and co-producing the Triple J staple and APRA-nominated single, ‘Spaceship’. Robert also worked with Penelope Austin, co-writing and co-producing several tracks, including "Smoke into Flames" (October 2012), "A Place to Call Home" (March 2013), and "Don't Rescue Me". During 2013, "A Place to Call Home" was used for the Australian TV series of the same name. Robert and Penelope Austin co-wrote "The Dark Collide" with J. J. Abrams and Charles Scott. Which was used on the Australian version of the Star Trek Into Darkness soundtrack (April 2013). He has also co-written and produced Penelope's upcoming debut album, which will be out through Beautiful Dark/Mercury Records (Universal Music). He also features heavily as a co-writer and producer on Georgi's upcoming debut album release through Parlophone in the UK. Robert has also lent his producing skills to a number of independent artists, including up-and-coming Triple J favorites The Delta Riggs (Talupo House Mountain Music Volume 1) and world-busking band Set Sail (The Riley Moore EP). Along with co-writing with a number of Aussie artists, including Delta Goodrem, Marvin Priest, and Tim Omaji, he has taken on mixing duties for new artists, ‘The Walking Who’ and ‘Okenyo.

== Other work ==
Robert is the CEO of Specific Music, which is a boutique music publishing and production company based in Sydney. They specialize in finding new talent, developing 'up-and-coming' songwriters, producers, and artists, and introducing them into the music industry. Specific Music is sub-published through Kobalt, and they work closely with the Kobalt team to help songwriters, producers, and artists get the opportunities they need to continue to grow. His first signing to the fledgling label was songwriter and producer Alex Hope, who was part of the Specific Music stable of writers and worked with a variety of artists, including Tina Arena and Bluejuice. Penelope Austin, was also signed to Specific Music and teamed up with Conley to work on the tracks "A Place to Call Home,"Smoke into the flames","The Dark Collide" to name a few. His latest signing to Specific Music is up and coming artist and songwriter, Dean Lewis.

Robert is also the co-founder, along with Leonie Conley, of Australia's biggest songwriting camp, held annually in Sydney – 50 Songs in 5 Days. Specific Music's – '50 Songs in 5 Days', in partnership with APRA AMCOS, is an invitational songwriting camp for Australia's best songwriters and artists. Artists and writers to have taken part in the camp include Joel Little (Lorde), 5 Seconds of Summer, Jarryd James, Art Vs Science, Jessica Mauboy, Kim Churchill, Jon Hume from Evermore(band), Tina Arena, Bonnie Anderson, M-Phazes, Louis Schoorl, Lisa Mitchell, Penelope Austin, Reigan Derry, Julian Hamilton (The Presets), Erij J(Producer), The Thundamentals, Kavyen Temperley (Eskimo Joe) to name a few. 2015 is the 4th year that 50 Songs in 5 Days will be running. Many songs cut and released from the camp, including Jai Waetford's ‘Get To Know You’, Taylor Henderson's ‘Burnt Letters’, Benny Tipene ‘Lonely’.

On April 22, 2015, Robert and Leonie Conley launched The Brilliant Building in Sydney. The building incorporates office space, a television and photographic studio and a gorgeous intimate live performance space and lounge. The building was launched by International Grammy award nominated artist and performer, Aloe Blacc. Aloe performed his three hits, Wake Me Up, I Need a Dollar, and I'm The Man. On May 16 was the launch of the first in a series of monthly music nights, ‘A Brilliant Secret' that are very small and strictly invitation only. Up and coming artist, Thief, was the first Brilliant Secret headliner artist followed by Thelma Plum, Rai Thistlewaight, Emma Birdsall, Kahlo, Nathan Hawes, Taylor Henderson, Martha Marlow, Georgi Kay, Sahara Beck, Adam Martin & Dean Lewis, among others.

In 2015 Robert was voted in by the APRA board as the new Musical director for the APRA Music Awards. The first APRA Music Awards 2015 he curated as the Musical Director was held at The Carriageworks in Sydney on March 24, 2015, and he retained the position in 2016 & 2017. Robert is also an APRA AMCOS Ambassador and regularly travels around Australia mentoring students at various high schools as part of the Song makers Workshop.

== Awards and nominations ==
Robert regularly writes and produces music for television and has had his songs synced for HBO, SOHO, Channel 7, including the theme song to their hit drama, 'A Place To Call Home' and the national Channel 7 News spot, 'Worlds Apart' written with Ilan Kidron as Go! Comet. He has also had syncs with Channel 10 and a variety of other ads. Promo's that he has done the music for have won the Promax Awards twice. In 2013, Robert placed 2nd in the Vanda & Young Global Songwriting Competition with his song, ‘Paper Thin’, co-written by Alex Hope and Roberto De Sa. First place went to ThePreatures for ‘Is This How You Feel’. He also wrote and produced the APRA Nominated, ARIA top ten Gold single for Axle Whitehead, "I Don't Do Surprises". He also collaborated with JJ Abrahams and got a song into the ‘Star Trek – Into Darkness’ movie.

== Discography ==
Year	Song/Album	Artist	Credit
1999	"Alive III Album"	Kiss	Assistant Engineer
2000	"She Bangs" (song from Sound Loaded album)	Ricky Martin	Programmer/Engineer
2000	"My Baby You" (song from Marc Anthony album)	Marc Anthony	Programmer/Engineer
2000	"Dont Let Me Leave" (song from Marc Anthony album)	Marc Anthony	Programmer/Engineer
2001	"When You Told Me You Loved Me" (song from Irresistible album)	Jessica Simpson	Programmer/Engineer
2001	"To Fall in Love Again" (song from Irresistible album)	Jessica Simpson	Programmer/Engineer
2001	"Nobody Wants To Be Lonely" (song from Sound Loaded album)	Ricky Martin and Christina Aguilera	Programmer/Engineer
2001	"Brown Eyes" (song from Survivor album)	Destiny's Child	Programmer/Engineer
2002	"A New Day Has Come" (song from A New Day Has Come album)	Celine Dion	Programmer/Engineer
2002	"Nature Boy" (song from A New Day Has Come album)	Celine Dion	Programmer/Engineer
2002	"Prayer" (song from A New Day Has Come album)	Celine Dion	Programmer/Engineer
2002	"Novus" (song from Shaman album)	Carlos Santana featuring Plácido Domingo	Programmer/Engineer
2002	"Spin" Album	Darren Hayes	Programmer/Engineer
2002	"Crush(1980 Me)" (song from Spin album)	Darren Hayes	Co-writer/Programmer/Engineer
2002	"Love with My Eyes Closed" (song from Only A Woman Like You album)	Michael Bolton	Programmer/Engineer
2002	"The Centre of My Heart" (song from Only A Woman Like You album)	Michael Bolton	Programmer/Engineer
2003	"You're The Only Place" (song from SoulO album)	Nick Lachey	Programmer/Engineer
2004	"The Tension and the Spark" Album	Darren Hayes	Co-writer/Co-producer
2005	"So Beautiful" (song from Truly Madly Completely: The Best Of Savage Garden album)	Savage Garden	Co-writer
2008	"Losing Sleep" Album	Axle Whitehead	Co-writer/Producer
2009	"I Don't Do Surprises" Single	Axle Whitehead	Co-writer/Producer
2009	"Anywhere" Single	Axle Whitehead	Co-writer/Producer
2009	"Spaceship" Single	Phrase	Co-writer/Co-producer
2009	"Pornstar" Single	Amy Meredith	Co-writer/Co-producer
2010	"Restless" Album	Amy Meredith	Co-writer/Co-producer
2010	"Lying" Single	Amy Meredith	Co-writer/Co-producer
2010	"Young at Heart" Single	Amy Meredith	Co-writer/Co-producer
2010	"Just Say So" Single	Brian McFadden	Co-writer/Co-producer
2010	"Wall of Soundz" Album	Brian McFadden	Co-writer/Producer
2010	"Chemical Rush" Single	Brian McFadden	Co-producer
2010	"Mistakes" Single	Brian McFadden (singer) and Delta Goodrem	Co-producer
2011	"Accidents Happen" Single	Zoe Badwi	Co-producer
2011	"Talupo House Music Volume 1" EP	The Delta Riggs	Co-producer
2011	"Come Party With Me and That's How Life Goes" Singles	Brian McFadden	Co-Writer/ Co-producer
2011	"The Riley Moore EP" EP	Set Sail	Co-producer
2012	"Wrap My Arms" Single	Brian McFadden	Co-producer
2012	"Stupid Mistake" Single	Darren Hayes	Co-Writer/Co-producer
2012	"Smoke into Flames" Album	Penelope Austin	Co-Writer/Co-producer
2013	"Let Me In" (Song from Reset Album)	Tina Arena	Co-Writer/Co-producer
2013	"Patchwork Heart" (Song from Reset Album)	Tina Arena	Co-Writer/Co-producer
2013	"It's Just What It Is" (Song from Reset Album)	Tina Arena	Co-producer
2013	"Don't Look Back" (Song from Reset Album)	Tina Arena	Co-Writer/Co-producer
2013	"Destination Unknown" (Song from Reset Album)	Tina Arena	Co-producer
2013	"Lose Myself" (Song from Reset Album)	Tina Arena	Co-Writer
2013	"In My Mind EP" Album	Georgi Kay	Co-Writer/Co-producer
2013	"Home"	Ivan Gough, Walden, Jebu &Penelope Austin	Co-Writer
2013	"A Place To Call Home" Album	Penelope Austin	Co-Writer/Co-producer
2013	"Don't Rescue Me"	Penelope Austin	Co-Writer
2013	"The Dark Collide" (song from Star Trek Into Darkness)	Penelope Austin	Co-Writer
2015	"Dynamite Featuring Baro" Album	Penelope Austin	Co-Writer/Co-producer
2015	"TRIGGER" Single	Penelope Austin	Co-Writer/Co-producer
2015	"George Constanza" Single	BlueJuice	Co-Writer/Producer
2015	"Origins EP" Album	Georgi Kay	Co-Writer/Co-producer
2015	"God of a Girl" Single	Georgi Kay	Co-Writer/Producer
2016	"Love Is Cold" Single	Georgi Kay	Co-Writer/Producer
2016	"More Than This" Single	Georgi Kay	Co-Writer/Producer
2016	"Circles" Single	Georgi Kay	Co-Writer/Producer
2016	"Give Me Love" Single	Georgi Kay	Co-Writer/Producer
2016	"I C U – feat: Thelma Plum" Single	AB Original	Co-Writer/Producer
2016	Meant To Be" Album	The Koi Boys	Producer – Mix Engineer
2016	"Meant To Be – Waiata's Song" Single	The Koi Boys	Co-Writer/Producer
2016	"Angels Have To Fly" Single	The Koi Boys	Co-Writer/Producer
2016	"Y.E.S." Single	The Koi Boys	Co-Writer/Producer
2016	Consolation Prize" (Song from Glorious Heights Album)	Montaigne	Co-Writer
2016	"Warriors" Single	Lisa Mitchell	Co-Writer
