= 100th Window =

2003 studio album by Massive Attack

Studio album by Massive Attack
- Released: 10 February 2003
- Recorded: 2002
- Studio: Sony (London)
- Genres: Electronica; trip hop; post-rock; downtempo; ambient dub
- Length: 73:52
- Label: Virgin
- Producers: Robert Del Naja; Neil Davidge

Massive Attack chronology
Singles 90/98 (1998)	100th Window (2003)	Danny the Dog (2004)

Singles from 100th Window
- 1. "Special Cases" Released: 24 February 2003; 2. "Butterfly Caught" Released: 16 June 2003

100th Window is the fourth studio album by English electronic music group Massive Attack, released on 10 February 2003 by Virgin Records. The album was mainly produced by lead member Robert “3D” Del Naja, after the departure of Andrew “Mushroom” Vowles from the band shortly after the release of their previous album Mezzanine (1998). Grant “Daddy G” Marshall also opted out of the production of the album. 100th Window features vocals from regular guest Horace Andy, as well as newcomers Sinéad O'Connor and Damon Albarn (performing as 2D from Gorillaz). Stylistically, it is the first album by the group to make no use of existing samples, and contains none of the hip hop or jazz fusion styles that the group were initially known for.

== Background ==
Del Naja initially conceived of 100th Window in its untitled form in early 2000 at the Christchurch Studios in Clifton, Bristol, recruiting Lupine Howl, a band made up of ex-members of Spiritualized, for the new project. In a November 2001 interview, Lupine Howl's lead singer Sean Cook described the sessions as "very experimental [...] minimal loops and noises that were fed to our headphones from the computer up in the control room. Then we would have this sort of extended jam session playing along to them and they would do various things to do the loops." Del Naja and Davidge also maintained a strobe light in their studio while the band jammed, dictating the intensity of their performances with the lighting. However, in a post to Massive Attack's forums in July 2002, Del Naja subsequently announced that the band had become "very unhappy with the shapes being formed", and that by the beginning of 2002 they had discarded most of the material that was written up to that point; the September 11 attacks also motivated him to depart from the original tone of the album.

== Reception ==
Professional ratings
Aggregate scores
Source	Rating
Metacritic	75/100
Review scores
Source	Rating
AllMusic	4/5 stars
Alternative Press	4/5
Entertainment Weekly	C
The Guardian	3/5 stars
Los Angeles Times	3/4 stars
Mojo	4/5 stars
Pitchfork	5.1/10
Rolling Stone	3/5 stars
Spin	7/10
Uncut	4/5 stars

Initial critical response to 100th Window was positive. At Metacritic, which assigns a normalised rating out of 100 to reviews from mainstream critics, the album has received an average score of 75, based on 25 reviews.

As of February 2010, the album had sold 180,000 copies in the United States, according to Nielsen SoundScan.

== Track listing ==
All tracks are written by Robert Del Naja and Neil Davidge, except tracks 2, 4 and 6, written by Del Naja, Davidge and Sinéad O'Connor.

No.	Title	Vocals	Length
1.	"Future Proof"	3D	5:37
2.	"What Your Soul Sings"	Sinéad O'Connor	6:37
3.	"Everywhen"	Horace Andy	7:37
4.	"Special Cases"	Sinéad O'Connor	5:09
5.	"Butterfly Caught"	3D	7:33
6.	"A Prayer for England"	Sinéad O'Connor	5:44
7.	"Small Time Shot Away"	3D	7:57
8.	"Name Taken"	Horace Andy	7:47
9.	"Antistar"	3D	19:40

=== Notes ===
- Track 7 features backing vocals by the character 2-D, performed by Damon Albarn.
- On track 9, "Antistar" ends at 8:17. At 8:47, an untitled instrumental track, commonly referred to as "LP4", plays.

== Personnel ==
Credits adapted from the liner notes of 100th Window.

=== Musicians ===
- Alex Swift – keyboards
- Sinéad O'Connor – vocals
- Horace Andy – vocals
- Robert Del Naja – vocals, string arrangement
- Angelo Bruschini – guitar
- Damon Reece – drums
- Jon Harris – bass
- Stuart Gordon – violin
- Skaila Kanga – harp
- Craig Pruess – string arrangement, conducting
- Neil Davidge – string arrangement
- Gavyn Wright – orchestra leader
- 2-D (performed by Damon Albarn) – backing vocals on "Small Time Shot Away"

=== Technical ===
- Robert Del Naja – production
- Neil Davidge – production
- Alex Swift – additional programming
- Lee Shephard – recording, engineering
- Mark "Spike" Stent – mixing (Note: Mixed at Olympic Studios (London))
- Paul "P Dub" Walton – mixing assistance
- David Treahearn – mixing assistance
- Robert Haggett – mixing assistance
- Tim Young – mastering (Note: Mastered at Metropolis Studios (London))
- Mike Ross – recording

=== Artwork ===
- Robert Del Naja – art direction, design
- Tom Hingston – art direction, design
- Nick Knight – photography

== Charts ==
=== Weekly charts ===
Weekly chart performance for 100th Window
Chart (2003)	Peak position
Australian Albums (ARIA)	4
Austrian Albums (Ö3 Austria)	4
Belgian Albums (Ultratop Flanders)	1
Belgian Albums (Ultratop Wallonia)	2
Canadian Albums (Billboard)	8
Czech Albums (ČNS IFPI)	7
Danish Albums (Hitlisten)	2
Dutch Albums (Album Top 100)	9
European Albums (Music & Media)	1
Finnish Albums (Suomen virallinen lista)	1
French Albums (SNEP)	1
German Albums (Offizielle Top 100)	3
Greek Albums (IFPI)	1
Hungarian Albums (MAHASZ)	25
Irish Albums (IRMA)	1
Italian Albums (FIMI)	2
Japanese Albums (Oricon)	21
New Zealand Albums (RMNZ)	5
Norwegian Albums (VG-lista)	4
Polish Albums (ZPAV)	1
Portuguese Albums (AFP)	17
Scottish Albums (Official Charts)	1
Spanish Albums (AFYVE)	18
Swedish Albums (Sverigetopplistan)	19
Swiss Albums (Schweizer Hitparade)	1
UK Albums (Official Charts)	1
US Billboard 200	69
US Top Dance Albums (Billboard)	1

=== Year-end charts ===
Year-end chart performance for 100th Window
Chart (2003)	Position
Belgian Albums (Ultratop Flanders)	28
Belgian Albums (Ultratop Wallonia)	14
French Albums (SNEP)	53
German Albums (Offizielle Top 100)	87
Italian Albums (FIMI)	52
Swiss Albums (Schweizer Hitparade)	66
UK Albums (OCC)	105
US Top Dance/Electronic Albums (Billboard)	2

== Certifications and sales ==
Certifications and sales for 100th Window
Region	Certification	Certified units/sales
Australia (ARIA)	Gold	35,000^{^}
Austria (IFPI Austria)	Gold	15,000^{*}
Belgium (BRMA)	Gold	25,000^{*}
Portugal (AFP)	Silver	10,000^{^}
Switzerland (IFPI Switzerland)	Gold	20,000^{^}
United Kingdom (BPI)	Gold	216,607
United States	—	180,000
^{*} Sales figures based on certification alone.^{^} Shipments figures based on certification alone.
