= Penelope Austin =

Australian singer-songwriter

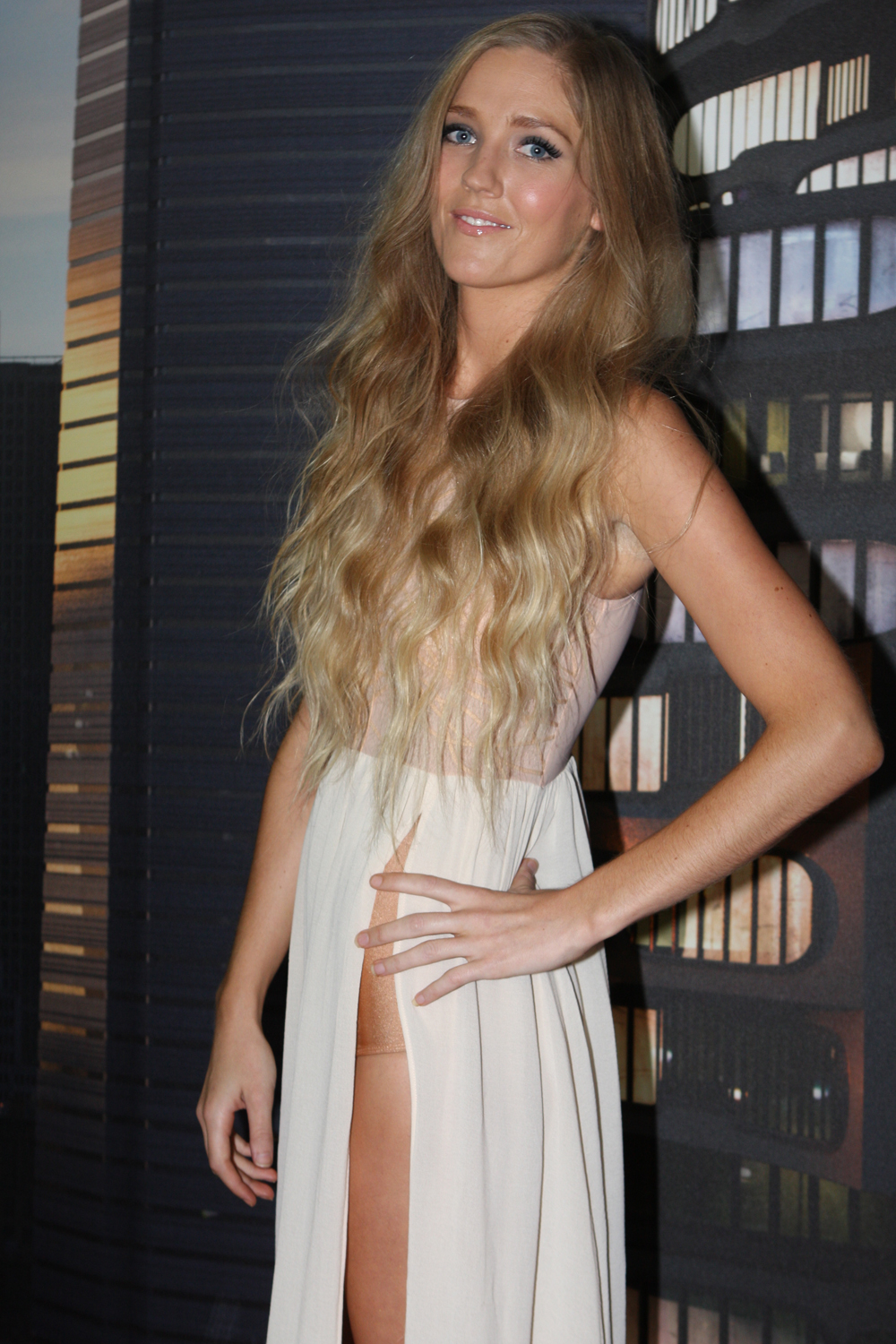
- Austin in 2013

Background information
- Genre: Electropop
- Occupation: Singer-songwriter
- Instruments: Vocals, guitar
- Years active: 2008–present
- Website: penelopeaustin.com

Penelope Austin is an Australian singer-songwriter. She performs electropop music. She released her debut extended play, The Beautiful Dark on 30 May 2013. She has co-written several tracks with United States record producer and songwriter, Robert Conley including "Smoke into Flames" (October 2012), "A Place to Call Home" (March 2013), and "Don't Rescue Me" (May). During 2013 "A Place to Call Home" was used for the Australian TV series of the same name. Austin and Conley co-wrote "The Dark Collide" with J. J. Abrams and Charles Scott. Austin's performance of "The Dark Collide" was used on the Australian version of the Star Trek Into Darkness soundtrack (April 2013).

== Early life ==
Penelope Austin was in born in the Southern Highlands of New South Wales. After her mother died, when Austin was 14, she taught herself to play guitar. By the following year she was writing her first song. Her early influences included artists such as Sarah McLachlan, Simon & Garfunkel, Bob Dylan, Fleetwood Mac and Cat Stevens. Since turning 18 she has spent most of her time overseas, including being based in New York. During her travels she concentrated on collecting inspiration to help her develop her songwriting skills.

== Career ==
=== "Smoke into Flames" ===
In 2011 Austin returned to Australia and in 2012 she started writing again with longtime collaborator, United States-born producer and songwriter Robert Conley, who was based in Sydney. She released "Smoke into Flames", written by Austin and Conley, as a single in October 2012. A music video for the single was shot in an abandoned town near Salton Sea, California, which was directed by Imogene Barron, and Ben Sullivan was the director of photography. It has a sequence of stylised visions of Austin as she explores the town.

"Smoke into Flames" was available on iTunes but was not released to radio. In October the song was featured in the 2012 Brand Campaign for SoHo Channel (Foxtel) in Australia. From December a second track, "Don't Rescue Me" (written by Austin, Conley and Joel Chapman), was used in the HBO summer brand campaign which ran into January. The two-minute ad ran in cinemas and on radio for HBO series including True Blood, Game of Thrones, and Girls. In May 2013 "Don't Rescue Me" was issued as a single on iTunes.

=== The Beautiful Dark ===
In March 2013 Australian TV network Channel Seven used Austin's track, "A Place to Call Home", to promote their drama series of the same name. Austin had teamed up with Conley again to write the track. Also in March it was made available on iTunes, peaking at number 26. Rebecca Starford of The Guardian was not impressed by Austin's "whiny tones" and was prepared to dislike the series due to the ad.

On 30 May 2013 Austin's first extended play, The Beautiful Dark, was released. All five tracks were written by Austin and Conley; with both the original and acoustic versions of "A Place to Call Home" as well as "Don't Rescue Me", "Smoke into Flames" and a previously unreleased track, "Dangerzone". "Dangerzone" had been short-listed for the Vanda & Young Songwriting Competition.

In March Austin and Conley won a competition to collaborate with US producer, J. J. Abrams, on a track for the Australian version of the science fiction film, Star Trek Into Darkness (April 2013). The pair wrote the lyrics to music by Abrams and Charles Scott for the track, "The Dark Collide". Austin described how it had taken her and Conley under two hours to write the lyrics and melody "Robert and I have a tendency to collaborate quickly, so for us it was a very natural process". The track is featured during a club scene in the film, five other versions were used in different countries. Austin declared that it was a "phenomenal opportunity that six artists around the world have been offered".

In late 2013 Austin was the featured vocalist on two club tracks. "Animal Heart" by Denzal Park featuring Austin was co-written by Austin with Cameron Denny and Paul Zala; and was released on Beatport on 25 November and iTunes Australia on 29 November. "Home" by Ivan Gough, Walden and Jebu featuring Austin was released on Beatport on 9 December; it is a remix of Austin's "A Place to Call Home". It was played by Pete Tong several times on his BBC radio program.

By mid-2013 Austin and Conley were also working on her debut album, she has found it "difficult at times because I think I have finalised the tracks then along comes another one that I love and we're reassessing the whole project over! ... I feel a lot of the time with my music the instrumentation sounds peaceful – eloquent and silent. Yet the words are quite confronting. I think ultimately that's why I'm drawn to writing about them – they scare me". In May 2014, Austin travelled to London to attend a songwriting camp and continue working on her debut album.
