= Anywhere (Axle Whitehead song) =

Single by Axle Whitehead

from the album Losing Sleep
- Released: 9 August 2008
- Recorded: 2008
- Genre: Alternative rock, pop
- Length: 3:51
- Label: Roadshow, Sony BMG
- Songwriter(s): Robert Conley and James Bryan
- Producer(s): Robert Conley

Axle Whitehead singles chronology
"I Don't Do Surprises" (2008)	"Anywhere" (2008)	"Satellite" (2008)

"Anywhere" is the second single by Axle Whitehead, from his debut album Losing Sleep.

== Track listing ==
All music is composed by Axle Whitehead

CD single
No.	Title	Writer(s)	Length
1.	"Anywhere"	Robert Conley and James Bryan	3:51
2.	"Where to Now"	Axle Whitehead, Robert Conley, Corey Hague	4:42
Total length:			8:32

iTunes EP
No.	Title	Writer(s)	Length
1.	"Anywhere"	Robert Conley and James Bryan	3:50
2.	"Where to Now"	Axle Whitehead, Robert Conley, Corey Hague	4:42
3.	"I Don't Do Surprises" (The Slips Mix)	Axle Whitehead and Robert Conley	5:51

== Charts ==
Chart performance for "Anywhere"
Chart (2008)	Peak position
Australia (ARIA)	77

== Release history ==
Region	Date	Label	Format	Catalogue
[Australia	9 August 2008	Roadshow, Sony BMG	CD	3014802
[Australia	9 August 2008	Roadshow, Sony BMG	Digital download	-
