= Dawn of the Planet of the Apes (soundtrack) =

Dawn of the Planet of the Apes (Original Motion Picture Soundtrack)

Film score by Michael Giacchino
- Released: July 7, 2014
- Recorded: 2014
- Studios: Newman Scoring Stage, Twentieth Century Fox Studios
- Genre: Film score
- Length: 77:21
- Labels: Sony Classical; Fox Music
- Producer: Michael Giacchino

Michael Giacchino chronology
Star Trek Into Darkness (2013)	Dawn of the Planet of the Apes (2014)	This Is Where I Leave You (2014)

Dawn of the Planet of the Apes (Original Motion Picture Soundtrack) is the score album to the 2014 film of the same name. Directed by Matt Reeves, the film is a sequel to Rise of the Planet of the Apes (2011) and the second installment in the Planet of the Apes reboot franchise. Reeves' frequent collaborator Michael Giacchino, who previously worked on Cloverfield (2008) and Let Me In (2010), composed the film's score. He significantly created themes deriving his own compositions from Lost (2004–2010) and Super 8, and had referenced Jerry Goldsmith's themes from the original 1968 film. The soundtrack was released by Sony Classical Records and Fox Music on July 7, 2014, and received polarising reviews with praise over the score's integration and criticism directed on the album length and lack of significant themes, with some comparing it as inferior to Giacchino's compositions.

== Development ==
Composer Michael Giacchino began working on the score during January 2014 at the Newman Scoring Stage. He employed a 89-piece ensemble from the Hollywood Studio Symphony orchestra and 70-person choir, for recording the score, which continued till late-June 2014. As like the previous instalments, percussionist Emil Richards played the score, while Giacchino's son Griffin Giacchino, had written an additional cue theme for the film.

While discussing with the music, Giacchino and Reeves had listened to Jerry Goldsmith's scores for the first Planet of the Apes franchise and Danny Elfman's score for Planet of the Apes (2001) for referencing, who felt "the monolith kind of music that you think of, that really tonal, eerie choir music", Reeves opined that it feels really elemental that "you are seeing the new dominant species on the earth. They've inherited the earth" and several references, from visuals, sound and music were originated from the first film and Stanley Kubrick's filmography.

Giacchino said that Goldsmith's score for the 1968 film was "one of the greatest scores" feeling that "I definitely want to tip my hat to what he brought to the table, but at the same time create something new that is relatable to the characters we're now dealing with. You find yourself trapped when you're paying homage to something and you're not paying attention to what you're supposed to be doing for the characters sometimes; it will create a disconnect for the audience" adhering to his collaboration with Brad Bird, he learnt that "director and composer need to be hand-in-hand every step of the way telling the same story, or else the audience gets to this place where they're thinking something we don't want them to think". He wrote a "big sweeping, orchestral score" even before the final edit, where Reeves suggested him to write the piece he hears and include in the final edit. Giacchino composed for several sequences despite some being cut out from the film.

== Track listing ==
All music is composed by Michael Giacchino.

No.	Title	Writer(s)	Length
1.	"Level Plaguing Field"		2:21
2.	"Look Who's Stalking"		2:35
3.	"The Great Ape Processional"		4:34
4.	"Past Their Primates"		1:57
5.	"Close Encounters of the Furred Kind"		4:38
6.	"Monkey to the City"		1:16
7.	"The Lost City of Chimpanzee"		3:46
8.	"Along Simian Lines"		5:04
9.	"Caesar No Evil, Hear No Evil"		2:27
10.	"Monkey See, Monkey Coup"		5:12
11.	"Gorilla Warfare"		7:37
12.	"The Apes of Wrath"		4:28
13.	"Gibbon Take"		2:55
14.	"Aped Crusaders"		3:26
15.	"How Bonobo Can You Go"		5:42
16.	"Enough Monkeying Around"		3:35
17.	"Primates for Life"		5:42
18.	"Planet of the End Credits"		8:56
19.	"Ain't That a Stinger"	Griffin Giacchino	1:10
Total length:			1:17:00

== Reception ==
The album received polarising reception, with some praising for the score being well-woven into the film, while other criticising the album presentation and lack of thematic structure. James Southall of Movie Wave wrote: "The score falls down in two ways – firstly for being so close to the Lost world and consequently losing a little of its impact; secondly from the album presentation, which is just far too long. It would be churlish to focus on that, though, when there's undoubtedly plenty of quality to be found – the atmosphere is carefully constructed, the core material is very strong, so with a better album production it could have really shone. As it stands – very decent but not really as spectacular as you always think it should be." Jonathan Broxton wrote for Movie Music UK: "Dawn of the Planet of the Apes is one of those rare scores where it works really well in the film, but suffers slightly when removed from its visual inspiration. There are many outstanding moments, most of them involving those aforementioned sequences of high emotion, but there are also far too many periods of curiously dead air, where nothing seems to happen for quite lengthy periods of time, causing the album to drag. I was disappointed by a Michael Giacchino score, because lord knows his disappointments are significantly superior to a large number of other composer's best works, but that's the price you pay for having the kind of stellar filmography Giacchino has established over the past decade. Fans of Lost and Super 8 will undoubtedly enjoy this continuation of the style, and although others would be advised to approach with a tiny bit of caution."

Filmtracks.com wrote: "There are two other detriments to Giacchino's score on album that are typical to the composer's career. First is his and his crew's asinine insistence upon cute cue titles that do little to help the listener identify where a cue is placed in the film (if, for instance, you want to find the music for that camcorder scene anyway, you're an ape out of luck). Far more important, however, is Giacchino's preference for an awkwardly dry mix to his scores, a choice he seemingly deviated from in John Carter but one that returns with a vengeance here. This is a fantasy score, and the eerie atmosphere in its suspenseful moments could have used reverb to achieve an outstanding effect. Instead, the score sounds very flat, exacerbating its restrained demeanor and really diminishing its potential impact. While functional in its purpose, this score is a laborious listening experience on album, a difficult one to ultimately recommend." In a positive note, James Christopher Monger of AllMusic wrote: "Big, bright, and brooding, yet surprisingly nuanced, Giacchino captures the mystery and the might of the series, offering up a rousing score that finds the middle ground between his evocative work on the television series Lost and the bold strokes he displayed with J.J. Abrams' Star Trek reboot."

Movie Music Mania wrote: "Michael Giacchino's score bears little resemblance to that of its predecessor, but the film itself is such a departure from Rise of the Planet of the Apes that this change seems warranted. The biggest drawback to Giacchino's Dawn of the Planet of the Apes, though, is its accompanying album release. Clocking in at over an hour and fifteen minutes, the album exacerbates the tediousness of some of its quieter moments and spreads out its highlights a little too much. The score has a lot of worthwhile material, but it's also one that, save for the propulsive action music, is quite slow paced and (in a rainy-day sort of way) oddly soothing. Its darker moments boast references to Goldsmith's Apes, as well as frequent quotations of Ligeti's dissonant choral work (which, considering Desplat's Godzilla, seems to be all the rage this year), but this is a Giacchino score through and through. Some may take issue with how familiar it all sounds, but if you can get past that, Dawn of the Planet of the Apes may actually surprise you. In this reviewer's opinion, its one of the better scores to accompany a blockbuster this year. Just don't get bogged down in its more stagnant moments."

== Accolades ==
Award	Category	Recipients and nominees	Result	Ref(s)
Saturn Awards	Best Music	Michael Giacchino	Nominated	
World Soundtrack Academy	Film Composer of the Year	Michael Giacchino (also for Inside Out, Jupiter Ascending, Jurassic World, Tomorrowland)	Won	

== Personnel ==
Credits adapted from CD liner notes.

- Music – Michael Giacchino
- Recording – Joel Iwataki, Tim Lauber
- Engineer – Denis St. Amand
- Mixing – Joel Iwataki
- Mastering – Patricia Sullivan
- Music editing – Paul Apelgren, Alex Levy, Warren Brown
- Music supervisor – Patrick Houlihan
- Music co-ordinator – Andrea Datzman
- Music librarian – Jeff Kryka, Nicholas Jacobson-Larson, Booker White

Instruments

- Bass – Charles Nenneker, Donald Ferrone, Edward Meares, Karl Vincent, Michael Valerio, Norman Ludwin, Oscar Hidalgo, Peter Doubrovsky, David Stone
- Bassoon – Allen Savedoff, Andrew Radford, Rose Corrigan
- Cello – Armen Ksajikian, Dane Little, Dermot Mulroney, Giovanna Clayton*, John Acosta (2), Kevan Torfeh, Richard Naill, Stefanie Fife, Suzie Katayama, Vahe Hayrikyan*, Vanessa Freebairn-Smith, Victor Lawrence, Steve Richards
- Clarinet – Don Markese, John Mitchell, Michael Vaccaro
- Flute – Dick Mitchell, Steve Kujala, Bobby Shulgold
- French Horn – Brad Warnaar, Brian O'Connor, Dave Everson, Joseph Meyer, John Reynolds, Steve Becknell, Tawnee Pumphrey, Rick Todd
- Harp – Eleanor Choate, Gayle Levant
- Oboe – Joseph Stone, John Yoakum
- Organ – Mark Le Vang
- Percussion – Alan Estes, Alex Acuna, Bernie Dresel, Emil Richards, Haig Shirinian, Michael Englander, Walter Rodriguez, Dan Greco
- Piano – Mark Gasbarro
- Timpani – Don Williams, Peter Limonick
- Trombone – Alan Kaplan, Charlie Loper, Bill Reichenbach, Alex Iles
- Trumpet – Jeff Bunnell, Rick Baptist, Jon Lewis
- Tuba – John Van Houten, Jr
- Viola – Alan Busteed, Alma Fernandez-Heath, Andrew Duckles, Cameron Patrick, Caroline Buckman, Evan Wilson, Harry Shirinian, Jerome Gordon, Jorge Moraga, Karen Elaine, Karie Prescott, Marda Todd, Michael Nowak, Pamela Goldsmith, Scott Hosfield, Victoria Miskolczy, Darrin McCann
- Violin – Aimee Kreston, Alyssa Park, Armen Anassian, Barbra Porter, Carolyn Osborn, Chang (Tina) Qu, Charlie Everett, Charlie Bisharat, Darius Campo, Galina Golovin, Gina Kronstadt, Jim Sitterly, Joel Derouin, John Wittenberg, Josefina Vergara, Lawrence Greenfield*, Marina Manukian, Mark Robertson, Miwako Watanabe, Norm Hughes, Peter Kent, Razdan Kuyumjian, Rebecca Bunnell, Robert Matsuda, Ron Clark, Shalini Vijayan, Shari Zippert, Songa Lee, Terence Glenny, Tiffany Hu, Vladimir Polimatidi, Ken Yerke

Orchestra and choir

- Orchestra – The Hollywood Studio Symphony
- Choir – AJ Teshin, Adair Gilliam, Aleta Braxton-O'Brien, Alvin Chea, Amick Byram, Amy Englehart, Amy Fogerson, Andrea Datzman, Ann Sheridan, Arnold Livingston Geis, Ayana Haviv, Baraka May Williams, Bill Cantos, Bob Joyce, Bobbi Page, Christine Guter, Christy Crowl, Clydene Jackson, Craig Copeland, D J Harper, David Joyce, Debbie Hall Gleason, Ed Zajac, Edie Lehmann Boddicker, Eric Bradley, Erica Sims, Farah Kidwai, Fletcher Sheridan, Gary Stockdale, Gerald White, Greg Whipple, Gregg Geiger, Guy Maeda, Heidi Schnauppauff, Jenny Graham, Joan Beal, Joanna Bushnell, Josh Bedlion, Julie Minasian, Karen Harper, Karen Whipple Schnurr, Katie Campbell, Kerry Katz, Kim Switzer, Laura Jackman, Leanna Brand, Luana Jackman, Mark Beasom, Michael Geiger, Michael Lichtenauer, Monica Lee, Nancy Gassner Clayton, Oren Waters, Randy Crenshaw, Reid Bruton, Renee Burkett, Rick Logan, Sally Stevens, Samela Beasom, Sandie Hall, Scott Oatley, Sharmila Guha, Steve Amerson, Susie Stevens-Logan, Suzanne Waters, Teri Koide, Todd Honeycutt, Victoria Levy, Virenia Lind, Walt Harrah, Will Goldman
- Concertmaster – Clayton Haslop
- Orchestration – Tim Simonec
- Additional orchestration – Andrea Datzman, Jeff Kryka, Marshall Bowen, Michael Giacchino
- Conductor – Tim Simonec
- Orchestra contractor – Connie Boylan, Reggie Wilson
- Choir contractor – Bobbi Page
- Stage manager – Richard Wheeler, Tom Steel
- Pro Tools operator – Vincent Cirilli

Management

- Music management – Areli Quirarte
- Business affairs – Tom Cavanaugh
- Executive in charge of music – Danielle Diego
- Music clearance – Ellen Ginsburg
- Music production supervisor – Rebecca Morellato
- Design – Sam Estes
