= Special Cases =

2003 single by Massive Attack

Single by Massive Attack

from the album 100th Window
- Released: 24 February 2003
- Studio: Sony (London, England)
- Length: 5:09 (album version); 3:46 (radio edit)
- Label: Virgin
- Songwriters: Sinéad O'Connor; Robert Del Naja; Neil Davidge
- Producers: Robert Del Naja; Neil Davidge

Massive Attack singles chronology
| "Inertia Creeps" (1998) | "Special Cases" (2003) | "Butterfly Caught" (2003) |

Music video
- "Special Cases" by Massive Attack on YouTube

"Special Cases" is a song by English trip hop group Massive Attack featuring vocals from Irish singer-songwriter Sinéad O'Connor, who also co-wrote the track. It appears on Massive Attack's fourth full-length album, 100th Window, and was released as the first single on 24 February 2003.

The single reached number 15 on the UK Singles Chart, number 19 in Greece, number 22 in Italy, and number 46 in Ireland. "Special Cases" is the group's only song to chart in Canada, where it reached number 25 on the Canadian Singles Chart. Despite being one of the band's higher-charting singles, it did not appear on their 2006 singles compilation, Collected. Two separate music videos were made for the song.

== Track listings ==
In addition to a radio edit of the original song, the single release contains a remix by Canadian electronica artist Akufen, as well as "I Against I", a song performed with Mos Def that appeared on the soundtrack of the 2002 film Blade II. 12-inch vinyl releases contain an additional remix of "Special Cases" by Vladislav Delay, who is credited as "Luomo" for this release. The enhanced CD contains one of the music videos, and the other video is on a rare DVD release of the single.

UK and European CD single

1. "Special Cases" (radio edit) – 3:46
2. "Special Cases" (Akufen remix) – 9:56
3. "I Against I" (featuring Mos Def) – 5:40
4. "Special Cases" (video version 2) – 5:09

UK 12-inch single

A. "Special Cases" (Akufen Remix) – 9:56
B. "Special Cases" (Luomo's Casing) – 7:56

UK DVD single

1. "Special Cases" (video version 1) – 5:09
2. "Special Cases" (radio edit) – 3:46
3. "Special Cases" (Akufen Remix) – 9:56
4. "Special Cases" (Luomo's Casing edit) – 4:43

Australian CD single

1. "Special Cases" (radio edit) – 3:46
2. "Special Cases" (Akufen remix) – 9:56
3. "I Against I" (featuring Mos Def) – 5:40

== Charts ==
| Chart (2003) | Peak position |
|---|---|
| Canada (Nielsen SoundScan) | 25 |
| Europe (Eurochart Hot 100) | 46 |
| Greece (IFPI) | 19 |
| Ireland (IRMA) | 46 |
| Italy (FIMI) | 22 |
| Scotland Singles (OCC) | 32 |
| UK Singles (OCC) | 15 |
| UK Dance (OCC) | 2 |

== Release history ==
| Region | Date | Format(s) | Label(s) | Ref. |
|---|---|---|---|---|
| United Kingdom | 24 February 2003 | 12-inch vinyl; CD; DVD | Virgin | |
| Australia | 17 March 2003 | CD | Virgin | |
