= The Wall (Australian game show) =

Australian television game show

- Genre: Game show
- Based on: The Wall by: Andrew Glassman; LeBron James
- Presented by: Axle Whitehead
- Theme music composer: Michael Lord
- Opening theme: "Behind the Wall"
- Ending theme: "Wall of Will" and "Trophies"
- Country of origin: Australia
- Original language: English
- No. of seasons: 1
- No. of episodes: 6

Production
- Production location: Poland
- Running time: 60 minutes
- Production company: Endemol Shine Australia

Original release
- Network: Seven Network
- Release: 30 October – 19 November 2017

The Wall is an Australian television game show based on the American version which began broadcast on Seven Network from 30 October 2017. The show is hosted by Axle Whitehead. The program ran for one season.

== Gameplay ==
The Wall is a four-story-tall pegboard, similar to a pachinko game or bean machine; it also is similar to the Plinko board used for that pricing game of the same name on The Price is Right. The bottom of the board is divided into 15 slots marked with various dollar amounts, some of which increase as the game progresses. Seven numbered "drop zones" are centered at the top of the board (above the center seven slots), from which balls can be dropped into play.

A team of two contestants plays each game, with a potential top prize of more than A$12,000,000. Green balls dropped on the board will add to the team's bank, while red balls dropped on the board will subtract from it. Throughout the game, the bank has a floor of $0.

=== Round 1: Free Fall ===
In Free Fall, the team is asked a series of five questions, each with two answer choices. As each question is asked, three balls are simultaneously released from drop zones 1, 4, and 7. The team must select one answer and lock it in before the first ball crosses the threshold of a money slot. If the team's answer is correct, the balls turn green and their values are added to the team's bank. If the team answers incorrectly or fails to lock in an answer, the balls turn red and their values are subtracted from the team's bank.

If the team's bank balance is zero at the end of this round, the game ends immediately and they leave with no winnings. Otherwise, their earnings become part of a guaranteed payout to be offered to them at the end of the game. The maximum amount that a team can bank in this round is $375,000.

The values on the board range from $1 to $25,000, similar to 5 seasons in (The Wall) and are arranged as follows:

$1	$5,000	$100	$20,000	$10	$10,000	$1	$25,000	$1	$10,000	$10	$20,000	$100	$5,000	$1

=== Round 2 ===
At the start of the second round, the contestants are separated from each other for the remainder of the game. One enters an isolation chamber behind The Wall, while the other remains onstage. Two green balls are played simultaneously, dropped from zones chosen by the onstage player. Three multiple-choice questions are then played, each with three answer choices. The onstage player is shown only the answers to each question and must decide which zone to use, based on how confident he/she is that the isolated player can answer correctly. The question and answers are then presented to the isolated player; after he/she responds, the ball is dropped from the chosen zone. A correct answer turns the ball green and adds the value of the slot it lands in to the team bank, while a miss turns the ball red and deducts the value. The isolated player is not told which of his/her answers are correct or given any information on the team bank.

The onstage player is offered an opportunity to "Double Up" on the second question and "Triple Up" on the third; these options allow him/her to play two or three balls from the selected drop zone instead of one, respectively.

After the third question, if the banked total is at least $3 (as the least that could be lost from two red balls is $2), two red balls are dropped simultaneously from the same zones that were chosen for the initial two green balls. The maximum amount that a team can bank in this round is $1,999,998.

The values on the board range from $1 to $250,000, (similar to first 3 seasons) and are arranged as follows:

$1	$5,000	$100	$10,000	$10	$25,000	$1	$50,000	$1	$100,000	$10	$125,000	$100	$250,000	$1

=== Round 3 ===
Gameplay proceeds as in Round 2, but each of the three questions now has four answer choices. In addition, four green and four red balls are played at the start and end of the round respectively, and are dropped one at a time, rather than simultaneously. The "Double Up" and "Triple Up" options are available as before.

The maximum amount that a team can bank in this round is $9,999,996.

The values on the board range from $1 to $1 million, (similar to 5 seasons in US) and are arranged as follows:

$1	$50,000	$100	$100,000	$10	$150,000	$1	$200,000	$1	$300,000	$10	$400,000	$100	$1,000,000	$1

=== Final Decision ===
After the third question in Round 3, the isolated player is sent a contract by the host and must either sign or tear it up. Signing the contract gives up the team bank in favor of a guaranteed payout, equal to the Free Fall winnings plus an additional $20,000 for every question answered correctly in Rounds 2 and 3. If the isolated player destroys the contract, the team receives their final bank total instead. After the four red balls have dropped in Round 3 and the final bank is calculated (or after the last question if there is less than $4 banked), the isolated player returns to the stage to reveal his/her decision. Only at this point does he/she learn the number of correct answers given, the payout total, and the team's final bank. If the isolated player destroys the contract, the team receives their final bank total instead.

The maximum possible guaranteed payout is $495,000, obtained by scoring $375,000 in Free Fall and answering all questions correctly in Rounds 2 and 3. The maximum possible bank total is $12,374,994, obtained by answering every question correctly, having every green ball drop into the highest-valued slot, and having the six mandatory red balls each drop into a $1 slot.

== Production ==
The game show was recorded in Szeligi, Warsaw, Poland alongside the Polish, Romanian, British, Russian, Hungarian, and Finnish versions of the show. Subsequently, the crew was largely Polish and the audience consisted of English-speaking locals and Australian ex-pats.

Despite some reasonable ratings across the six episodes that went to air in 2017, the show did not return in 2018.

== Episodes ==
Color key

The contestants won at least $1,000,000.
The contestants left with the larger possible amount.
The contestants left with the smaller possible amount.
The contestants left with nothing at all.

Episode	Contestants	Relationship	Guaranteed Payout Contract			Final Total	Contract Decision
Episode	Contestants	Relationship	Free Fall Bank	Correct Answers (Bonus)	Total Offer	Final Total	Contract Decision
1	Chrissy and Dez	Husband and wife	$140,123	5 ($100,000)	$240,123	$700,335	Accepted
2	Jess and Lee	Husband and wife	$95,404	3 ($60,000)	$155,404	$249,999	Accepted
3	Jane and Alan	Father in law and daughter in law	$65,105	4 ($80,000)	$145,105	$0	Rejected
4	Kent and Suz	Husband and wife	$75,135	5 ($100,000)	$175,135	$935,385	Accepted
5	Bron and Michelle	Long lost sisters	$80,242	4 ($80,000)	$160,242	$880,373	Accepted
6	Rosanna and Laurie	Husband and wife	$110,112	4 ($80,000)	$190,112	$0	Rejected

== Ratings ==
No.	Title	Air date	Timeslot	Overnight ratings		Consolidated ratings		Total viewers	Ref(s)
No.	Title	Air date	Timeslot	Viewers	Rank	Viewers	Rank	Total viewers	Ref(s)
1	Chrissy and Dez	30 October 2017	Monday 7:30pm	974,000	4	54,000	1	1,028,000	
2	Jess and Lee	31 October 2017	Tuesday 7:30pm	795,000	6	23,000	6	818,000	
3	Jane and Alan	5 November 2017	Sunday 7:00pm	755,000	6	9,000	6	764,000	
4	Kent and Suz	6 November 2017	Monday 7:30pm	687,000	11	27,000	12	714,000	
5	Bron and Michelle	12 November 2017	Sunday 7:00pm	669,000	6	15,000	7	684,000	
6	Rosanna and Laurie	19 November 2017	Sunday 7:00pm	634,000	7	26,000	7	660,000	
