= The Scientists of Modern Music =

Australian electronic music group

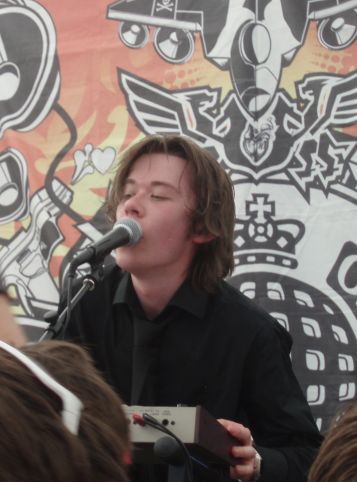
- Cal Young of TSOMM performing at MS Fest, 2007

Background information
- Also known as: TSOMM
- Origin: Hobart, Australia
- Genres: Electronica, electronic rock
- Years active: 2005–2012
- Labels: Rubber Records
- Members: Cal Young; Simon McIntosh

The Scientists of Modern Music were an electronic group from Hobart, Australia, consisting of Cal Young and Simon McIntosh.

== History ==
In 2004, Cal Young & Simon McIntosh started wagging audio design classes together, in order to jam on a very old drum kit and an un-tunable guitar just for kicks. They later progressed into electronic music, hoarding bits and pieces off eBay to start a band which became The Scientists of Modern Music. The duo came second in a college band competition, strangely listed under 'acoustic rock', but still managed to make an impact which scored them a couple of local shows in late 2005. From there Cal and Simon wrote a handful of songs in the space of two weeks and released a home brew EP, which gained them a special mention on Triple J and secured TSOMM a place on various radio stations around Australia. After performing around the mainland multiple times, the head of Rubber Records (Melbourne) spotted the duo and signed to the label to release their debut commercial EP 'Electronic Sunset'.

The band then embarked on various shows, and played the festival circuit including both Falls Festivals and Golden Plains Festival, and toured with bands such as Midnight Juggernauts, The Presets and the Dukes of Windsor. They then re-released their EP as an album length CD which scored them rotation on Triple J for their song 'Easy'.

TSOMM's debut album A Personal Universe was released via Rubber/Shock on Friday 18 May 2012. It was produced between September 2008 and December 2010. The duo went to London to complete the record with Rob Haggett and David Treahearn of The Slips, and it was mastered by the late Nilesh Patel and Simon Davey at The Exchange.

== Live ==
The band is known for its energetic and exciting live shows. Young and McIntosh have even been known to get off stage and join the crowd to mosh, while the music keeps playing. When performing live, the band have a distinctive dress: Cal Young wears a black suit, black shirt and black shoes and Simon McIntosh wears all white in a similar fashion.

== Band members ==
- Cal Young - Synthesiser, Vocoder, Vocals
- Simon McIntosh - Synthesiser, Vocoder, Vocals, Guitar

== Discography ==
- Number One (EP) (2006)
- Robot On (single) (2006)
- Electronic Sunset (EP) (2007)
- Electronic Sunset (Album length) (2008)
- Because If I Die (Single) (2011)
- Girl On Top (Single) (2011)
- A Personal Universe (Debut album) (18 May 2012)

== Performances ==
=== Festivals ===
- Falls Festival (2006)
- MS Fest (2007)
- Southern Roots Festival (2007)
- Falls Festival (2007)
- Soundscape Festival (2008)
- Golden Plains Festival (2008)
- Climate Festivals (2008)
- Grazzhopper Festival (2008)
- Pyramid Rock Festival (2008)
- Meredith Music Festival (2008)
- Kiss My Grass (2009)
- MS Fest (2009)
- Hot Barbeque (2010)
- Sandcastles (2010)
- MONA FOMA (2011)
- Falls Festival (2011/12)
- Breath Of Life Festival (2012)

=== Supports ===
- The Presets
- Infusion
- Gerling
- Midnight Juggernauts
- Van She
- Crazy Penis
- Girl Talk
- Regurgitator
- Dukes of Windsor
- The Galvatrons
- JD Samson & MEN
- The Adults
