= Mission: Impossible – Ghost Protocol (soundtrack) =

Mission: Impossible – Ghost Protocol (Music from the Motion Picture)

Film score by Michael Giacchino
- Released: December 13, 2011
- Recorded: 2011
- Genre: Film score
- Length: 76:28
- Label: Varèse Sarabande
- Producer: Michael Giacchino

Michael Giacchino chronology
| Monte Carlo (2011) | Mission: Impossible – Ghost Protocol (Music from the Motion Picture) (2011) | John Carter (2012) |

Mission: Impossible – Ghost Protocol (Music from the Motion Picture) is the score album to the 2011 film Mission: Impossible – Ghost Protocol. The fourth installment in the Mission: Impossible film series, starring Tom Cruise, and the sequel to Mission: Impossible III (2006), the film is directed by Brad Bird (in his live-action debut) and featured musical score composed by Michael Giacchino, who scored for Mission: Impossible III (2006), and also for Bird's previous animated Pixar films The Incredibles (2004) and Ratatouille (2007), conducted by Tim Simonec and performed by the Hollywood Studio Symphony. Varèse Sarabande released the soundtrack on December 13, 2011.

== Development ==
Ghost Protocol's soundtrack has a Russian-influence, in tune to the film's setting. The scoring process was delayed, due to Giacchino's commitments on scoring Cars 2 and Super 8. The recording of the score in August 2011 at the Newman Scoring Stage in 20th Century Fox Studios at Los Angeles, California, and was completed early-December.

As in previous installments, the score incorporates Lalo Schifrin's themes from the original television series. Explaining the stylistic influence generated by Schifrin's history with the franchise, Giacchino said "Lalo is an amazing jazz writer. You know you can't write a straight-up jazz score for a film like this but you can certainly hint at it here and there". He used a 6/8 – 2/4 rhythmic pattern of the theme, instead of a 5/4 rhythmic pattern, which Giacchino added that, traditionally in that tune, the lower strings are first played using the "Bom, Bom, Bom-Bom" theme followed by upper strings and woodwinds. But, he did not use strings for that melody, and instead give energy on the melodic tunes, playing "Bop-pa-pa, Bop-pa-pa...". The tune was played using an electric guitar and limited the strings in the lower level, with a slower version of the main melody being overlapped by a jazz theme in the upper layer.

He then described the idea, to Bird who called it as "astonishing" and gave creative freedom to work on that tune. He wanted to make the theme as "modern and hip and energetic and oppressive as you possibly can and that will just keep the audience busy".

== Release history ==
Varèse Sarabande released the soundtrack of Ghost Protocol on December 13, 2011 in digital and physical formats.

To honor the 10th anniversary of the film's release, in May 2022, Mondo announced two double-disc vinyl sets. The soundtrack is pressed in a 180-gram yellow marble (sand storm) and black colored vinyl. The album also featured two cover artworks from different stills, one featuring Tom Cruise as Ethan Hunt climbing on a Burj Khalifa, and the other featured a darkened side profile of Cruise, in the film. Pre-orders for the vinyl disc began on May 11, 2022, and was marketed and released on June 3, 2022.

Mondo also released a slip-case featuring vinyl disc of the soundtracks from the first four instalments, including the vinyl edition of Ghost Protocol soundtrack.

== Reception ==
Ghost Protocol's score received positive critical response. James Christopher Monger of Allmusic gave the score 7.5 out of 10. In his review for MTV, Williams Goss praised Giacchino's score as "another rousing score that leaps forth from the classic themes of the show to define itself in rightfully thrilling ways". Justin Chang of Variety wrote "Michael Giacchino once again supplies jazzy, propulsive riffs on Lalo Schifrin’s classic theme". Todd McCarthy of The Hollywood Reporter also wrote "Michael Giacchino‘s active, imaginative, nearly ever-present score nicely incorporates Lalo Schifrin‘s original TV theme, as the previous films also did." David Edelstein of Vulture opined that "Giacchino does more variations on Schifrin’s M:I theme than Beethoven did on Diabelli's".

Mfiles wrote "The composer's attention to detail is particularly impressive: rarely a moment goes by when he isn't introducing a new motif, reprising his own ideas or adapting Schifrin's previous themes. Consistent with both the original sound of the TV series and his earlier score for the third film, Giacchino mixes together a plethora of ideas, meaning there's rarely a dull moment. Mission Impossible: Ghost Protocol is one of Giacchino's most entertaining scores and one of the most entertaining action adventure scores of 2011." James Southall of Movie Wave called it as "a solid enough score – though far from one of the composer’s finest – but the recording just drags all the life out of it". Filmtracks.com wrote "Giacchino scores all are among the driest, flattest, and dullest currently recorded and released on album, but Ghost Protocol is so muted at times that it seems like it's practically in monaural sound. The completely dead mix continues to diminish even Giacchino's liveliest works."

== Track listing ==
All music is composed by Michael Giacchino.

| No. | Title | Length |
|---|---|---|
| 1. | "Give Her My Budapest" | 1:57 |
| 2. | "Light the Fuse^{[a]}" | 2:01 |
| 3. | "Knife to a Gun Fight" | 3:42 |
| 4. | "In Russia, Phone Dials You^{[b]}" | 1:40 |
| 5. | "Kremlin with Anticipation^{[b]}" | 4:12 |
| 6. | "From Russia with Shove^{[a]}" | 3:37 |
| 7. | "Ghost Protocol^{[a]}" | 4:58 |
| 8. | "Railcar Rundown^{[a]}" | 1:11 |
| 9. | "Hendricks' Manifesto^{[a]}" | 3:17 |
| 10. | "A Man, A Plan, A Code, Dubai^{[a]}" | 2:44 |
| 11. | "Love the Glove^{[a]}" | 3:44 |
| 12. | "The Express Elevator^{[a]}" | 2:31 |
| 13. | "Mission Impersonatable" | 3:55 |
| 14. | "Moreau Trouble Than She's Worth" | 6:44 |
| 15. | "Out for a Run" | 3:54 |
| 16. | "Eye of the Wistrom" | 1:05 |
| 17. | "Mood India^{[a]}" | 4:28 |
| 18. | "Mumbai's the Word" | 7:14 |
| 19. | "Launch Is on Hendricks" | 2:22 |
| 20. | "World's Worst Parking Valet^{[a]}" | 5:03 |
| 21. | "Putting the Miss in Mission^{[a]}" | 5:19 |
| 22. | "Mission: Impossible Theme (Out with a Bang Version)" | 0:53 |

== Personnel ==
Credits adapted from CD liner notes

- Music producer – Michael Giacchino
- Score recordist – Tim Lauber
- Recorded by – Dan Wallin
- Mixed by – Dan Wallin
- Mastered by – Erick Labson
- Musical assistance – Dave Martina, Griffy Giacchino
- Score editor – Michael Bauer, Ramiro Belgardt, Tommy Lockett
- Supervising score editor – Alex Levy
- Liner notes – Brad Bird, Michael Giacchino
- Music co-ordinator – Andrea Datzman, Jason Richmond
- Copyist – Nicholas Jacobson-Larson, Booker White
- Scoring crew – Ryan Robinson, Tom Hardisty
- Executive producer – Robert Townson
- Executive in charge of music – Randy Spendlove

Choir

- Choir – Page LA Studio Voices
- Baritone – Amick Byram, Guy Maeda, James Creswell, Norman Large
- Bass – Michael Geiger, Reid Bruton, Royce Reynolds, Vatsche Barsoumian
- Tenor – Agostino Castagnola, Gerald White, John Kimberling, Jonathan Mack
- Vocal contractor – Bobbi Page

Orchestra

- Orchestra – The Hollywood Studio Symphony
- Orchestrator – Andrea Datzman, Brad Dechter, Michael Giacchino
- Orchestra conductor – Tim Simonec
- Orchestra contractor – Reggie Wilson
- Concertmaster – Clayton Haslop
- Stage engineer – Denis Saint-Amand
- Stage manager – Greg Dennen, Tom Steele, Jamie Olvera
- Pro-tools operator – Vincent Cirelli

Instrumentation

- Bass – Dave Stone (principal), Charles Nenneker, Ed Meares, Karl Vincent, Nico Abondolo, Norm Ludwin, Peter Doubrovsky, Timothy Emmons
- Bass clarinet – John Mitchell
- Bass trombone – Bill Reichenbach, Phillip Teele
- Bassoon – Rose Corrigan (principal), Andy Radford
- Celeste – Mark Gasbarro
- Cello – Steve Richards (principal), Armen Ksajikian, Dermot Mulroney, Giovanna Clayton, John Acosta, Kevan Torfeh, Stefanie Fife, Suzie Katayama, Timothy Landauer, Vahe Hayrikyan, Victor Lawrence
- Clarinet – Michael Vaccaro (principal), Don Markese
- Drum – Bernie Dresel
- Electric bass – Abe Laboriel
- English horn – Joseph Stone
- Flute – Bobby Shulgold (principal), Dick Mitchell, Steve Kujala
- French horn – Brad Warnaar, Joseph Meyer, John Reynolds, Mark Adams, Nathan Campbell, Phillip Yao, Steve Becknell, Steve Durnin
- French Horn [principal] – Brian O'Connor (principal), Rick Todd (principal)
- Guitar – Carl Verheyen, George Doering
- Harp – Gayle Levant
- Oboe – John Yoakum
- Keyboards – Mark Le Vang
- Percussion – Dan Greco (principal), Alex Neciosup-Acuna, Emile Radocchia, Mike Englander, Walter Rodriguez
- Piano – Mark Gasbarro
- Timpani – Don Williams
- Trombone – Alex Iles (principal), Alan Kaplan, Steve Holtman
- Trumpet – Malcolm McNab (principal), Jeff Bunnell, Paul Salvo, Rick Baptist, Wayne Bergeron
- Tuba – John Van Houten (principal), Douglas Tornquist
- Viola – Darrin McCann (principal), Alan Busteed, Caroline Buckman, Evan Wilson, Harry Shirinian, Jorge Moraga, Karen Elaine, Karie Prescott, Maria Newman, Pamela Goldsmith, Richard Rintoul, Robert Brophy, Victoria Miskolczy
- Violin – Ken Yerke (principal), Aimee Kreston, Alex Shlifer, Alyssa Park, Anatoly Rosinsky, Barbra Porter, Cameron Patrick, Carolyn Osborn, Charles Bisharat, Darius Campo, Galina Golovin, Gina Kronstadt, Haim Shtrum, Jackie Brand, Jim Sitterly, Joel Derouin, John Wittenberg, Josefina Vergara, Larry Greenfield, Marina Manukian, Mark Robertson, Miran Kojian, Miwako Watanabe, Norman Hughes, Peter Kent, Phillip Levy, Rafael Rishik, Razdan Kuyumjian, Rebecca Bunnell, Ron Clark, Sara Parkins, Shalini Vijayan, Shari Zippert, Sid Page, Tereza Stanislav, Terry Glenny, Tiffany Hu
- Vocals – Charanjeet Virdi, Farah Kidwai, Mala Ganguly

== Notes ==
- ^{^a} Contains Mission: Impossible Theme by Lalo Schifrin
- ^{^b} Contains Mission: Impossible Theme and "The Plot" by Lalo Schifrin
