= Let's Get It Started =

2004 single by the Black Eyed Peas

Single by the Black Eyed Peas

from the album Elephunk
- B-side: "The Way U Make Me Feel"; "Let's Get Retarded"; "Bridging the Gaps"
- Released: June 1, 2004
- Recorded: January 29 – September 17, 2002 ("Let's Get Retarded"); 2004 ("Let's Get It Started")
- Studio: The Stewchia (Los Angeles)
- Genre: Rap rock
- Length: 3:37
- Label: A&M; Interscope; will.i.am
- Songwriters: William Adams; Allan Pineda; Jaime Gomez; Terence Yoshiaki; Michael Fratantuno; George Pajon, Jr.
- Producer: will.i.am

The Black Eyed Peas singles chronology
"Hey Mama" (2004)	"Let's Get It Started" (2004)	"Don't Phunk with My Heart" (2005)

Music video
- "Let's Get It Started" on YouTube

"Let's Get It Started" is a song by American group the Black Eyed Peas. It is a clean version of the original "Let's Get Retarded" from their third studio album, Elephunk (2003). The album version was originally only reworked for its use in promotion for the 2004 NBA playoffs on ABC in April 2004, and the clean version was released as the fourth and final single from Elephunk on June 1, 2004, by A&M Records and Interscope Records; it also appears on a reissue of the album.

"Let's Get It Started" peaked at number 21 on the US Billboard Hot 100, reaching the top ten in Australia, Canada, Czech Republic, France and New Zealand. Critically acclaimed, it won Best Rap Performance by a Duo or Group at the 47th Annual Grammy Awards (2005), and was also nominated for Record of the Year and Best Rap Song. The song's accompanying music video features the group energetically performing in a nighttime Los Angeles setting.

"Let's Get It Started" was remixed for the Black Eyed Peas' fifth studio album The E.N.D. (2009) as "Let's Get Re-Started"; it is included on its deluxe edition bonus disc. It was also featured on their remix album The E.N.D. Summer 2010 Canadian Invasion Tour: Remix Collection (2010). In early 2022, "Let's Get Retarded" was replaced with "Let's Get It Started" on the track listing of Elephunk on all digital and streaming platforms; however, it is still available with the purchase of the full Let's Get It Started – EP release in the iTunes Store.

== Background ==
The song grew out of a track from Busta Rhymes' old group Leaders of the New School. The track was from the album T.I.M.E.. The Arc of the United States, an advocacy group for people with intellectual disabilities, successfully lobbied The Black Eyed Peas’ recording company to change the original title of the song from "Let's Get Retarded" to "Let's Get It Started."

== Music video ==
The music video for "Let's Get It Started" takes place in a nighttime setting on a Los Angeles street. It features the Black Eyed Peas, particularly will.i.am, performing energetic dances while singing the song, while varying objects in the background (including a grand piano) smash against the ground in real time, slow and fast motion, and in reverse. The choruses feature the band on stage singing to a large crowd.

== Track listings ==
- Canadian and European CD single, Australian CD 1

UK 12-inch single

1. "Let's Get It Started" – 3:37
2. "The Way U Make Me Feel" – 4:19
3. "Let's Get Retarded" – 3:38
- UK CD single
1. "Let's Get It Started" – 3:37
2. "Let's Get Retarded" – 3:38
3. "Bridging the Gaps" – 4:56
4. "Let's Get It Started" (video)
- German mini-CD single
1. "Let's Get It Started"
2. "The Way U Make Me Feel"
- Australian CD2 and digital EP
1. "Let's Get It Started"
2. "The Way U Make Me Feel"
3. "Bridging the Gaps"
4. "Let's Get Retarded"

== Personnel ==
The Black Eyed Peas

- will.i.am – vocals, production, engineering
- apl.de.ap – vocals
- Taboo – vocals
- Fergie – vocals

Additional musicians

- George Pajon – guitar
- Mike Fratantuno – bass
- Terence Yoshiaki – drums
- Dante Santiago – backing vocals
- Noelle Scaggs – backing vocals (single version)
- Keith Harris – additional drums (single version)
- Tim "Izo" Orindgreff – saxophone, flute (single version)
- Printz Board – trumpet (single version)

Production personnel

- Ron Fair – executive production
- Dylan Dresdow – additional vocal engineering
- Tony Maserati – mixing
- Brian Gardner – mastering
- Lee Groves – programming (single version)
- Mark "Spike" Stent – mixing (single version)
- Robert Haggett – assistant mixing (single version)
- David Treahearn – assistant mixing (single version)

== Charts ==
=== Weekly charts ===
Weekly chart performance for "Let's Get It Started"
Chart (2004)	Peak position
Australia (ARIA)	2
Australian Urban (ARIA)	1
Austria (Ö3 Austria Top 40)	18
Belgium (Ultratop 50 Flanders)	22
Belgium (Ultratop 50 Wallonia)	24
Canada (Nielsen SoundScan)	2
Canada CHR (Nielsen BDS)	1
Canada CHR/Pop Top 30 (Radio & Records)	1
Canada Hot AC Top 30 (Radio & Records)	14
CIS Airplay (TopHit) Spike mix	83
Czech Republic (Rádio – Top 100)	6
Denmark (Tracklisten)	17
Eurochart Hot 100 (Billboard)	14
France (SNEP)	7
Germany (GfK)	18
Greece (IFPI)	38
Hungary (Rádiós Top 40)	37
Hungary (Dance Top 40)	1
Ireland (IRMA)	11
Italy (FIMI)	12
Netherlands (Dutch Top 40)	11
Netherlands (Single Top 100)	15
New Zealand (Recorded Music NZ)	6
Romania (Romanian Top 100)	20
Russia Airplay (TopHit) Spike mix	52
Scottish Singles Sales (Official Charts)	11
Switzerland (Schweizer Hitparade)	13
UK Singles (Official Charts)	11
US Billboard Hot 100	21
US Adult Pop Airplay (Billboard)	29
US Dance Airplay (Billboard)	13
US Pop Airplay (Billboard)	4
US Rhythmic Airplay (Billboard)	36

Chart (2020)	Peak position
Poland Airplay (ZPAV)	70

Chart (2024)	Peak position
Kazakhstan Airplay (TopHit)	40

=== Monthly charts ===
Monthly chart performance for "Let's Get It Started"
Chart (2004)	Peak position
Russia Airplay (TopHit)	72

Chart (2024)	Peak position
Kazakhstan Airplay (TopHit)	51

=== Year-end charts ===
Year-end chart performance for "Let's Get It Started"
Chart (2004)	Position
Australia (ARIA)	44
Australian Urban (ARIA)	19
Belgium (Ultratop 50 Wallonia)	98
Brazil (Crowley)	72
France (SNEP)	63
Netherlands (Dutch Top 40)	35
Russia Airplay (TopHit)	159
Switzerland (Schweizer Hitparade)	52
UK Singles (OCC)	127
US Billboard Hot 100	88
US Dance Radio Airplay (Billboard)	32
US Mainstream Top 40 (Billboard)	23

Chart (2005)	Position
US Adult Top 40 (Billboard)	79

Chart (2024)	Position
Kazakhstan Airplay (TopHit)	113

== Certifications ==
Certifications and sales for "Let's Get It Started"
Region	Certification	Certified units/sales
Australia (ARIA)	Platinum	70,000^{^}
Brazil (Pro-Música Brasil)	Gold	30,000^{‡}
Germany (BVMI)	Gold	150,000^{‡}
Italy (FIMI) sales since 2009	Gold	50,000^{‡}
New Zealand (RMNZ)	2× Platinum	60,000^{‡}
United Kingdom (BPI)	Platinum	600,000^{‡}
United States (RIAA)	4× Platinum	4,000,000^{‡}
^{^} Shipments figures based on certification alone.^{‡} Sales+streaming figures based on certification alone.

== Release history ==
Release dates and formats for "Let's Get It Started"
Region	Date	Format(s)	Label(s)	Ref.
United States	June 1, 2004	Digital download	A&M; Interscope	
United States	June 14, 2004	Contemporary hit radio	A&M; Interscope	
Australia	June 21, 2004	CD	Universal Music	
United States	June 22, 2004	Digital download (EP)	A&M; Interscope	
Australia	June 28, 2004	Maxi CD	Universal Music	
United Kingdom	June 28, 2004	12-inch vinyl; maxi CD	Polydor	
Germany	July 12, 2004	Maxi CD	Universal Music	
France	August 24, 2004	CD; maxi CD	Polydor	
