= John Carter (soundtrack) =

Film score by Michael Giacchino
- Released: March 6, 2012
- Recorded: 2011–2012
- Studio: Sony Scoring Stage (Culver City, California)
- Length: 73:56
- Label: Walt Disney
- Producer: Michael Giacchino

Michael Giacchino chronology
Mission: Impossible – Ghost Protocol (2011)	John Carter (2012)	Star Trek Into Darkness (2013)

John Carter is the soundtrack album to the eponymous 2012 science fiction action film directed by Andrew Stanton. The soundtrack, released by Walt Disney Records on March 6, 2012, features original score themes composed by Michael Giacchino, in his first and only collaboration with Stanton, and also replacing his norm composer Thomas Newman, whom he had previously scored for Stanton's animated films: Finding Nemo (2003) and WALL-E (2008). The score received critical acclaim.

== Development ==
In February 2010, Michael Giacchino revealed in an interview he would be scoring the film. However, recording sessions did not began until April 2011, when filming was completed and a lengthy post-production phase began in the middle of the year, while Giacchino also prioritised on other films including Super 8, Cars 2 and Mission: Impossible – Ghost Protocol, releasing that year. In his maiden collaboration with Stanton, who also working on his first live-action film, Giacchino said "I just had such a great time working with him, and I'm really proud of what he's done on his first live-action film. Which actually, the same for Brad Bird. You know, his first live-action film Mission: Impossible [Ghost Protocol]… You would never know that these guys had never made a live-action film before by watching these movies. You would think that they had done a hundred of them. It's really impressive, and I think their years at Pixar have really prepped them for this."

A year and a half later, in his New Yorker article, Friend documents accompanying Stanton on a visit to Giacchino where they discuss the movie's score and how it relates to the narrative. Stanton had put in the scratch music, the temporary music used to show what mood he wanted the actual score to reflect, himself rather than delegating that task to an editor as is commonly done. He told the composer that he wanted the music to reflect the two distinct plans driving the plot: Carter's and the Therns'. Stanton also said he wanted the music for Carter to change in a way that reflected his slow acceptance of himself as John Carter of Mars.

Stanton had used music from Perfume for the Therns; he wanted something similarly choral. With the opening voiceover and battle footage, he had put music from Syriana that sounded "dire and Middle Eastern and forlorn, like a culture clinging to its nobility." He suggested something similar to Giacchino as the "Mars theme", but advised against eventually merging it with Carter's theme. "[J]ust because you're master of the high seas doesn't mean you can't have a separate theme for the ocean." Giacchino agreed but suggested a different merger, doing the Mars theme chorally near the end of the film, to accentuate the Therns' apparently inevitable takeover of the planet, an idea Stanton eagerly accepted. A 10-minute preview of the film's score was streamed airplay in mid-December 2011 on WQXR-FM and its official website, and few snippets were premiered in late-January.

== Track listing ==
No.	Title	Length
1.	"A Thern for the Worse"	7:38
2.	"Get Carter"	4:25
3.	"Gravity of the Situation"	1:20
4.	"Thark Side of Barsoom"	2:55
5.	"Sab Than Pursues the Princess"	5:33
6.	"The Temple of Issus"	3:24
7.	"Zodanga Happened"	4:01
8.	"The Blue Light Special"	4:11
9.	"Carter They Come, Carter They Fall"	3:55
10.	"A Change of Heart"	3:04
11.	"A Thern Warning"	4:04
12.	"The Second Biggest Apes I've Seen This Month"	2:35
13.	"The Right of Challenge"	2:22
14.	"The Prize Is Barsoom"	4:29
15.	"The Fight for Helium"	4:22
16.	"Not Quite Finished"	2:06
17.	"Thernabout"	1:18
18.	"Ten Bitter Years"	3:12
19.	"John Carter of Mars"	8:53
Total length:		73:56

== Reception ==
Professional ratings
Review scores
Source	Rating
Examiner.com	5/5 stars
Film Music Magazine	(A)
Movie Music UK	4.5/5 stars
Tracksounds	(8/10)

Giacchino's score received critical acclaim, with critical review from Examiner.com gave a 5-star rating, and Film Music Magazine, also gave an A-grade rating for the score. The latter's review read "what Giacchino does so winningly with "John Carter," as in much of his big-ticket scoring, is to flood us with the kind of magic that makes the kid in all of us want to grow up to duel with two-story aliens, fly spaceships and kiss the voluptuous girl. They're all elements that made the properly called "John Carter of Mars" a progenitor of today's way-familiar genre spectaculars [...] As a composer who's been to plenty of those worlds during the formative years of his musical imagination, Giacchino continues to pay that tradition forward in wonderful style here." Movie Music UK, gave 4.5 stars and said "Listeners who enjoy large scale fantasy scores with strong main themes and significant action set pieces will enjoy John Carter greatly, as will those who appreciated Giacchino's earlier efforts in similarly-styled scores, especially the aforementioned likes of Super 8, and the Lost (TV series)."

Writing for Tracksounds, Christopher Coleman had stated the score as "stellar" and stated that it "performs better than the film itself and offers a number of great listening moments. Those who have enjoyed [Giacchino's] recent works, will enjoy this one, too. Those waiting and wanting more from the composer, will find more to sink their ears into as well. Finally, it is the promise held in the music of John Carter that might be the most exciting thing about it." Filmtracks.com summarised the review as: "The score as a whole is extremely enjoyable, and skeptics of the sometimes deadening, muted mix of the composer's work by Dan Wallin will be relieved by a more vibrant presentation here (though reverb is still too diminished for a fantasy score of this size). The weaknesses of the work relate to its somewhat muddy enunciations of its Mars-related secondary themes and a seeming inability by Giacchino to nail the narrative flow of the story through satisfying transitions (with an extended sense of anticipation). A more clearly delineated suite of all the themes would have been merited as well. The level of Williams' story-telling mastery is constantly suggested but remains an arm's length away. Still, it's a romp of a score that touches upon several of the composer's best attributes with dynamic enthusiasm."

== Accolades ==
The film's failure at the box-office, affected its prospects on receiving nominations at several award ceremonies, and could not be shortlisted at final nominations for Best Visual Effects and Best Original Score at the 85th Academy Awards. However, Giacchino won the ASCAP Award and International Film Music Critics Association award for Best Original Score for a Fantasy/Science Fiction/Horror Film, while further receiving a nomination for Film Music Composition of the Year.
