= Love Bites (band) =

English girl band

Love Bites are an English all-female pop punk band from Atherstone, a small town in Warwickshire, The Midlands. The group formed in 2004 and disbanded in 2007, but reformed again in 2011.

== Career ==
The band, named after the Def Leppard song, formed while the members were still in school. They started out as a three piece group consisting of Danielle Graham, Aimee Haddon and Hannah Haddon with Nicki Wood later joining the band. They did some touring and recording. In 2006, Wood left the band and was replaced by Beka Pritchard. They broke up the next year.

The band released their debut single, "You Broke My Heart", in October 2005. The single got to No. 13 on the UK Singles Chart. Shortly after, the band went on a tour to schools in the UK. The band released their second single, "He's Fit" in February 2006, which charted at No. 48. An album, Love Sucks was planned but was cancelled.

Love Bites formed again in 2019 for a music festival in their hometown of Atherstone, but now as a three piece, due to Nicki Wood, the second guitarist no longer taking part. Aimee, Hannah and Dani remained in the group.

They announced that they would continue to perform and would be writing and recording new material to be released sometime in the future.

== Singles ==
Love Bites singles
Release	Song	UK Singles Chart
2005	"You Broke My Heart"	13
2006	"He's Fit"	48
