= Axle Whitehead =

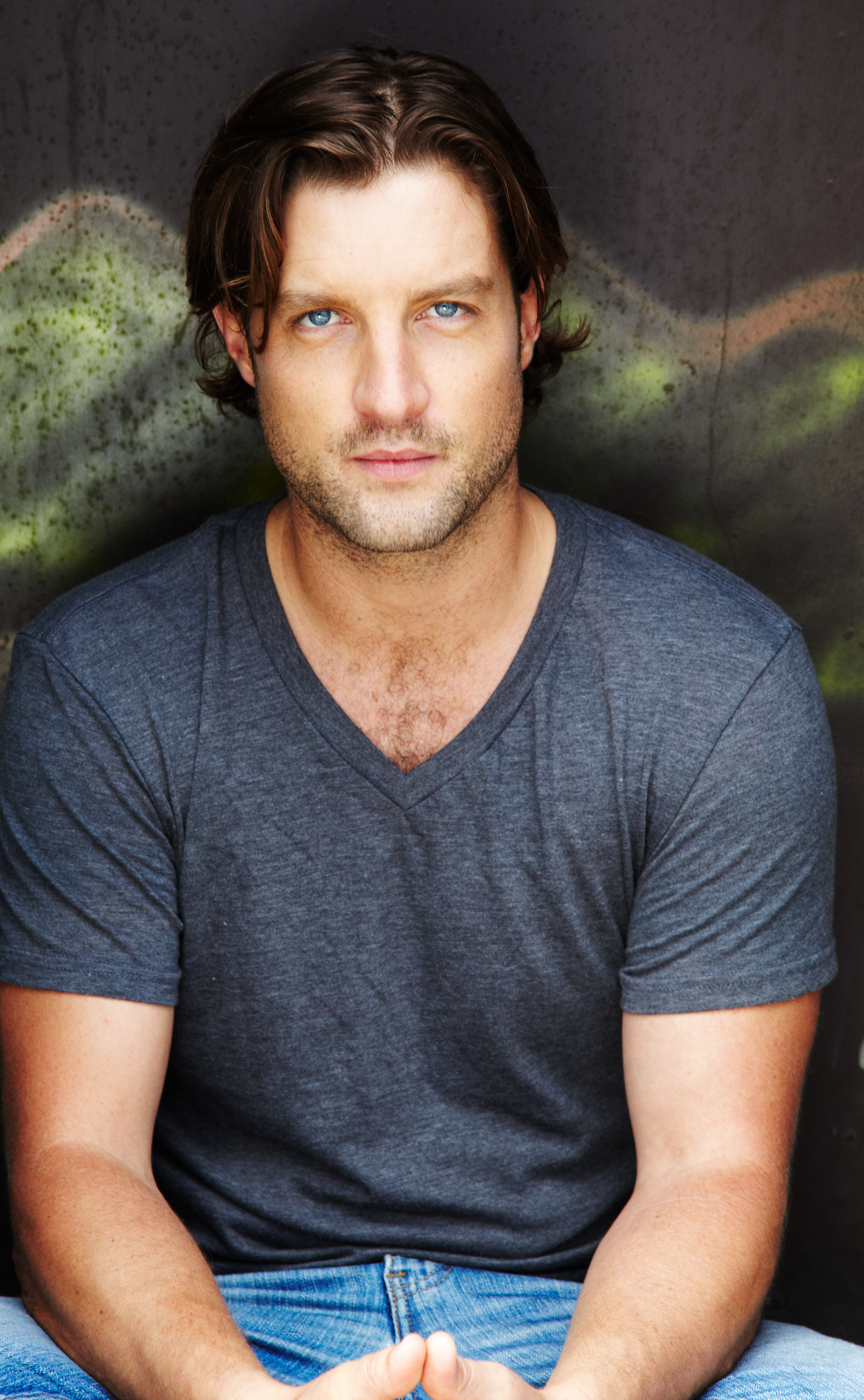
- Self-shot image of Axle Whitehead at home in 2015.

Background information
- Born: Axle Whitehead; 16 December 1980 (age 45); Warrnambool, Australia
- Genre: Alternative rock
- Occupations: Actor, singer, musician
- Years active: 2003–present
- Label: Sony Music Entertainment Australia

Axle Whitehead (born 16 December 1980) is an Australian TV host, singer, musician, and actor. He was a host on Video Hits. In 2008, he released his first studio album Losing Sleep which debuted outside the ARIA top 50. He also played Liam Murphy in Channel Seven's Home and Away and was the host of The World's Strictest Parents. In 2015, Whitehead began playing the role of Davis, a musician, in the Showtime series, Shameless. He formerly hosted the game show The Wall.

== Career ==
=== Music ===
In 1999 Whitehead was accepted into the Victorian College of the Arts to study Jazz Improvisation, then toured Australia and China with various bands. He was originally a contestant on the first series of Australian Idol in 2003. He failed to win the competition but made it into the top twenty. After being spotted on Idol, he was hired to host the television music show, Video Hits on Network Ten, hosting from 2004 to 1 November 2006. He travelled the world interviewing artists such as Beyoncé, Justin Timberlake, Oasis and Duran Duran. In October 2006, Whitehead was sacked as TV presenter of Video Hits after exposing himself on stage during the ARIA Music Awards.

Whitehead's debut single "I Don't Do Surprises" was released on radio during January 2008, debuting at No. 8 on the ARIA Charts in Australia on 17 March 2008. It also received airplay on Nova radio and surfaced on TV advertisements for popular Channel 10 shows House and Women's Murder Club, and Channel 7's Home and Away, being described as a cross between Coldplay and Robbie Williams. His debut album, Losing Sleep was mixed by UK mixer, David Treahearn and released through Roadshow Music on 22 August 2008. Whitehead made his return to Video Hits on 24 February 2008, and to Australian Idol on 5 September 2008, though only as a guest to promote his debut album. The third single off Losing Sleep, Satellite has received significant play on Channel V and Video Hits.

Whitehead released the soul-country single "One Gun" in 2021.

=== Acting ===
Whitehead's first acting roles were minor parts in the television series The Secret Life of Us, and the 2003 film, Ned Kelly. After taking acting lessons for eighteen months, Whitehead auditioned for a role in Home and Away, which he described as "such a great place to learn and hone your skills". He joined the cast for fifteen episodes as rocker Liam Murphy, making his debut on 5 March 2009, and later signed to be a regular cast member. Whitehead based his portrayal of the rocker on experiences of close friends, and said "you have to find a balance between putting yourself into it and not being too cheeky."

Whitehead hosted Seven Network's The World's Strictest Parents. In 2010, Whitehead was short-listed to host The X Factor Australia, but lost out to fellow Home and Away colleague Luke Jacobz.

Whitehead departed Home and Away in late 2012 to expand his acting career. He filmed his final scenes along with colleague Luke Mitchell (Romeo Smith). Whitehead moved to Los Angeles. After 18 months as an out of work actor, he landed a role in season 5 of the series Shameless. He played an Australian rock singer named Davis, a love interest of Fiona Gallagher (Emmy Rossum). He appeared in the first four episodes of Season 5 and a brief appearance in Episode 8.

In 2014, Whitehead was the runner-up for the Heath Ledger scholarship. In 2016, he played J. T. James / Hellfire, a recurring role in Agents of S.H.I.E.L.D. This role reunited him with Home and Away star Luke Mitchell.

In 2017, Whitehead began hosting Australian game show The Wall, which is based on the U.S. show of the same name. From 24 January 2020, Whitehead played the guest role of Zenin Alexio in Neighbours.

In 2021, Whitehead appeared on season three of The Masked Singer Australia making it to the Grand Final and finishing in third place as "Mullet". Whitehead credited the show with making him fall in love with music again. He joined the eighth series of SAS: Who Dares Wins as part of Team Australia. The series began airing in January 2026.

=== Cleo Bachelor of the Year ===
On 22 April 2009, Whitehead was announced Cleo Bachelor of the Year, beating competition from sportsmen, actors and other personalities. Sarah Oakes, Cleo Editor-in-chief denied the claims that Whitehead won as a direct result of a self-marketing ploy; "[He] is that perfect combination of good looks, charm, charisma and the kind of guy you'd be really happy to take home and introduce to your mum."

== Personal life ==
Whitehead is from Warrnambool. He became engaged to his partner Liezl Carstens in 2020.

== Discography ==
Axle Whitehead discography
- Studio albums: 1
- Extended plays: 1
- Singles: 3
- Music videos: 3
- Guest appearances: 2

Whitehead competed in the third round on the first season of Australian Idol in 2003. His debut extended play, The Axle Whitehead Band, was released as a collaboration in 2003 with jazz fusion band, the Axle Whitehead Band (feat. Steve Sedergreen, piano & keys). The release failed to rank on national charts. Whitehead released his debut studio album, Losing Sleep, in 2008 on Roadshow Music. The album peaked at number 68 on the Australian Top 100 Albums Chart. The lead single "I Don't Do Surprises" debuted at number eight on the Australian Top 100 Singles Chart and received gold certification by the Australian Recording Industry Association. The album's subsequent singles "Anywhere" and "Satellite" did not make the top 50.

=== Studio albums ===
List of albums, with selected details and chart positions
Title	Album details	Peak chart positions
Title	Album details	AUS
Losing Sleep	Released: 25 August 2008; Format: CD, digital download; Label: Roadshow Music (#3014382)	68

=== Extended plays ===
List of EPs, with selected details
Title	EP details
The Axle Whitehead Band	Released: 2003; Format: CD; Label: Independent

=== Singles ===
List of singles, with selected chart positions and certifications
Title	Year	Peak chart positions	Certifications	Album
Title	Year	AUS	Certifications	Album
"I Don't Do Surprises"	2008	8	ARIA: Gold	Losing Sleep
"Anywhere"	2008	77		Losing Sleep
"Satellite"	2008	—		Losing Sleep
"Sister Sunshine"	2011	—		Non-album single
"—" denotes releases that did not chart.

=== Music videos ===
Year	Song	Director
2008	"I Don't Do Surprises"	Grant Marshall
2008	"Anywhere"	Bart Borghesi
2008	"Satellite"	Bart Borghesi
2011	"Sister Sunshine"	

=== Guest appearances ===
Year	Song	Other performer	Album
2004	"Scatbox"	Joel Turner	Joel Turner and the Modern Day Poets
2005	"Silent Night"	The Axle Whitehead Band (feat. Steve Sedergreen, piano & keys).	The Spirit of Christmas 2005

== Filmography ==
=== Film ===
Year	Title	Role	Notes
2010	We of the Walls	Mr. Lester	Short film
2010	Storm in a teacup	Edward	Short film
2016	Run	Aussie bartender	Short film, post production
2016	Brock	Colin Bond	Television film, filming
2017	Craftique	Bucky	Pre-production

=== Television ===
Year	Title	Role	Notes
2004	The Secret Life of Us	Guy at bar	1 episode
2009–2013	Home and Away	Liam Murphy	682 episodes
2009–2012	The World's Strictest Parents	Himself	Narrator
2015	Shameless	Davis	5 episodes
2015	The Doctor Blake Mysteries	Len Webster	1 episode
2016	Agents of S.H.I.E.L.D.	J. T. James / Hellfire	6 episodes
2017	The Wall	Himself, presenter	6 episodes
2020	Neighbours	Zenin Alexio	Recurring role
