= DNR (music) =

British music production and songwriting team

DNR is a London based music production and songwriting team consisting of David Treahearn and Rob Haggett.

Starting out as assistant music engineers in 2000, Treahearn and Haggett first met at Olympic Studios in Barnes, London working with international artists including Madonna, Britney Spears, Gwen Stefani, Kylie Minogue, Oasis, Marilyn Manson, Björk, James Morrison, The Cure, Massive Attack, Dave Matthews, Keane, Natasha Bedingfield, Linkin Park and esteemed producers including Mark 'Spike' Stent, Mirwais, Stuart Price, Richard 'Biff' Stannard, Stephen Street, Cenzo Townsend, Ross Robinson, Dave Sardy and Ash Howes. Although primarily based at Olympic, the duo worked regularly in major studios across London and Los Angeles including Abbey Road, Metropolis, The Town House, Westlake, Ocean Way and Henson. It was during this time Haggett was credited as working on series 2 of the ITV reality television show Pop Idol.

The pair continued to work together after Olympic, and in 2006 developed DNR Music, primarily due to their increasing work in TV advertising, film and computer games. In 2008, DNR gained commercial traction in the Asian market with their song, "Ice Cream/Talk To Me" taken from their first 'PopStyles' album. The track was featured on Hong Kong's highest rating TV show, Moonlight Resonance and also used on Mexican TV series Julia y Mariana. Due to its popularity, the song was marketed as the lead track in Hong Kong on the Sony/BMG 2008 double CD compilation 'Strawberry Love' alongside Whitney Houston, Avril Lavigne, Britney Spears and Christina Aguilera. The PopStyles album also produced another commercial song, 'Fast Lane' which was featured in the 2007 film Brick Lane, directed by Sarah Gavron.

In 2009, DNR wrote, mixed and produced the second PopStyles Album. Subsequently DNR have written, produced and mixed singles and albums for production music companies Boosey & Hawkes, Universal, West One Music, Pitch & Sync and Sony/BMG.
