= I Don't Do Surprises =

Single by Axle Whitehead

from the album Losing Sleep
- Released: 8 March 2008
- Recorded: 2008
- Genre: Pop, alternative, nu-disco, funk, post-disco
- Length: 3:14
- Label: Roadshow, Sony BMG
- Songwriters: Axle Whitehead and Robert Conley
- Producer: Robert Conley

Axle Whitehead singles chronology
"I Don't Do Surprises" (2008)	"Anywhere" (2008)

"I Don't Do Surprises" is the debut single by Australian singer Axle Whitehead, from his debut album Losing Sleep. It peaked at number eight on the ARIA Singles Chart, and was certified Gold by ARIA. It spent a total of fifteen weeks in the top 50. "I Don't Do Surprises" also reached a peak position of #2 on the Australasian Singles Chart.

The single was nominated for a 2009 APRA Award for Most Played Australian Work, and was used as part of a television advertisement of Channel Seven's show, Home and Away.

== Track listing ==
All lyrics are written by Axle Whitehead and Robert Conley; all music is composed by Axle Whitehead.

CD single
No.	Title	Length
1.	"I Don't Do Surprises"	3:13
2.	"Maybe I Was Wrong"	3:04
Total length:		6:15

iTunes EP
No.	Title	Length
1.	"I Don't Do Surprises"	3:12
2.	"Maybe I Was Wrong"	3:02
3.	"I Don't Do Surprises" (dp vs. smack daniels A train Mix)	6:16
Total length:		12:30

== Charts ==
=== Weekly charts ===
Weekly chart performance for "I Don't Do Surprises"
Chart (2008)	Peak position
Australia (ARIA)	8
Australian AIrplay Chart	6

=== Year-end charts ===
Year-end chart performance for "I Don't Do Surprises"
Chart (2008)	Rank
Australia (ARIA)	70

== Release history ==
Region	Date	Label	Format	Catalogue
Australia	8 March 2008	Roadshow, Sony BMG	CD	3014392
Australia	8 March 2008	Roadshow, Sony BMG	Digital download	-

== Notes ==
- The Australian singles chart peak was retrieved on 29 June 2008
