= Robert Haggett =

British musician

- Origin: United Kingdom
- Genres: Pop
- Occupations: Record producer, songwriter and mix engineer

Robert Haggett was a British record producer, songwriter and mix engineer. He has worked with some of the world's most successful artists including Madonna, Gwen Stefani, The Black Eyed Peas, Björk, James Morrison and Depeche Mode.

In 2002, Haggett was employed by EMI as an audio engineer and worked with international mixer producer, Mark 'Spike' Stent. at Olympic Studios in Barnes, London. From 2001 to 2005 he worked alongside Stent and other producers including Mirwais Ahmadzaï and Stuart Price on Madonna's 'American Life' album Stephen Street and Cenzo Townshend on New Order's 2005 album 'Waiting for the Sirens' Call', Nellee Hooper and Dallas Austin on Gwen Stefani's 2004 album 'Love.Angel.Music.Baby'. During this time Haggett has been credited on over 50 commercial albums including, Marilyn Manson, Britney Spears, Elbow, Keane, Natasha Bedingfield, Janet Jackson, Depeche Mode, The Cure and Massive Attack. It was during this time Haggett was credited working on series 2 of the ITV reality television show Pop Idol

Haggett continued working at Olympic Studios and other recording studios including Abbey Road and Metropolis Studios in London and Henson Studios in Los Angeles. Regularly working with Richard 'Biff' Stannard, Wayne Hector, Ash Howes and Martin Harrington, Haggett received further credits for his involvement with The Spice Girls, Nelly Furtado, Sugababes and James Morrison. In 2006, Haggett co-wrote, produced and mixed two albums in the 'Popstyles' series with fellow producer and writer David Treahearn, under the production name DNR for UK Music distribution company Boosey & Hawkes. DNR's song, taken from Popstyles (track 8), 'Talk to Me/Ice Cream', was picked up as the main theme music for Hong Kong's high rating TV series Moonlight Resonance and featured on the Asian Sony/BMG double CD compilation Strawberry Love. Additionally, Haggett worked and was credited on the feature film 'The Butterfly' featuring Pierce Brosnan

He is credited with Gary Barlow on the Soundtrack to the UK Musical TV Series Brittania High. Haggett worked again French producer Mirwais Ahmadzaï, co-writing and co-producing the track 'Da' for French-Arabic project Y.A.S. on the debut album Arabology.

Haggett also worked with producer Biffco in the UK on series 7 of The X Factor and on the UK Number One track 'Heroes' by The X Factor Finalists. Haggett continued to mix and produce under DNR, who are credited with producing and mixing established and breaking Australian artists such as The Scientists of Modern Music, Bertie Blackman, Kimbra, Tin Alley, ABC Radio Triple J 'un-earthed' artist Cullen and Faker.
