= Star Trek Into Darkness (soundtrack) =

2013 album by Michael Giacchino

Star Trek Into Darkness: Music from the Motion Picture

Soundtrack album by Michael Giacchino
- Released: May 14, 2013 (Digital); May 21, 2013 (Physical); July 28, 2014 (Deluxe Edition)
- Recorded: March 5–9 and April 2 & 3, 2013; Sony Scoring Stage, Culver City, California
- Genres: Film score, Classical
- Length: 47:17 (Standard release)
- Label: Varèse Sarabande
- Producers: Michael Giacchino, J. J. Abrams, Bryan Burk

Michael Giacchino chronology
John Carter (2012)	Star Trek Into Darkness: Music from the Motion Picture (2013)	Dawn of the Planet of the Apes (2014)

Star Trek Into Darkness: Music from the Motion Picture is a soundtrack album for the 2013 film, Star Trek Into Darkness, composed by Michael Giacchino. The score was recorded over seven sessions at the Sony Scoring Stage in Culver City, California, on March 5–9 and April 2 and 3, 2013. It was performed by the Hollywood Studio Symphony in conjuncture with Page LA Studio Voices. The soundtrack album was released in physical form on May 21, 2013, through Varèse Sarabande, as the follow-up to the critically successful 2009 soundtrack album Star Trek.

== Development ==
Over a month prior to the commencement of the film's principal photography, composer Michael Giacchino announced that he would return to score the sequel to 2009's Star Trek. One of Giacchino's main tasks with the sequel, later entitled Star Trek Into Darkness, was to evolve the themes from the previous installment and create new ones to reflect the film's darker tone. "There's a moment when the Enterprise is taking off, and they are going off on their mission, and I thought 'This would be fun to bring back that similar moment from the first film,' but it wasn't working. It was too much of an adventure feel, and it was all about saying 'Okay, well how do I do that same idea but in a darker way?' It's all about finding the right chords and substitutions that you are using with those melodies – and how did that alter the melody? It's constantly trying to bend and twist things so you feel that theme from the previous film, but it's being used in a different way. You have a different emotional response to it. If I had just used it exactly as it was, it wouldn't have been the right emotional response that you would want for the audience. So it was about twisting things in a way to make it fit right." A specific example of this was during the composition of the track "London Calling." "[Director J. J. Abrams] just wanted it to feel like we weren't in a Star Trek movie," Giacchino said. "It was a very conscious decision to make that base sound different; then, from there, we were able to evolve to our theme for the character. I remember when J. J. heard it, he said, 'Oh, it sounds English. That's perfect!' I'm not exactly sure what that meant, but in his mind it fit perfectly. I was just going for something that felt emotional and questioning as opposed to being so direct that it tells you what's going on."

The score is notable for featuring orchestration that contains piano, the first Star Trek score to do so since Cliff Eidelman's score to Star Trek VI: The Undiscovered Country (1991), as well as a choir singing entirely in the Klingon language (which appears on the track entitled "The Qo'noS Wartet"). The score also contains interpolations of the "Theme from Star Trek", written by Alexander Courage. Two licensed songs are also featured in the film, though not included on the soundtrack album: Beastie Boys' "Body Movin' (Fat Boy Slim Remix)" and Albert King's "Everybody Wants to Go to Heaven".

Additional tracks were created by various artists across six countries as region-specific bonus tracks. The various songs played in their respected regions during a scene in which Scotty and Keenser are hanging out at a club. While the instrumental for the track is consistent throughout each of the artists' recordings, composed by J. J. Abrams and Charles Scott, each artist paired up with a music producer to write their own lyrics and melody for the song. The region-specific musicians include Kassia Conway with Anne Preven (United States/Canada), Bo Bruce with Gary Lightbody (United Kingdom), Penelope Austin with Robert Conley (Australia), Kyary Pamyu Pamyu with Yasutaka Nakata (Japan), I.V. (France), Roxana Puente (Mexico) and Céu (Brazil).

== Track listing ==
#	Name	Length	Description
1	"Logos / Pranking the Natives"	3:02	A re-recorded version of the fanfare for the Paramount Pictures, Skydance Productions, and Bad Robot logos from the 2009 film, followed by James T. Kirk and Leonard McCoy being chased by the indigenous population of the planet Nibiru.
2	"Spock Drops, Kirk Jumps"	1:45	Music accompanying Spock's attempt to stop an erupting volcano on Nibiru, followed by Kirk and McCoy jumping into the ocean to reach the Enterprise which is stationed underwater.
3	"Sub Prime Directive"	2:25	The Enterprise rising out of the Nibiran ocean and heading towards the volcano to save Spock, thereby violating the Prime Directive. This is followed by the music accompanying the main title. Incorporates the "Theme from Star Trek."
4	"London Calling"	2:11	Thomas Harewood, a Section 31 Startfleet officer, visits his terminally ill daughter in a hospital just outside London, and there he is approached by John Harrison.
5	"Meld-merized"	2:41	Kirk and Spock attend to a dying Admiral Christopher Pike, and Harrison transports himself to the Klingon homeworld of Kronos.
6	"The Kronos Wartet"	5:27	A shuttlecraft commanded by Kirk, Spock and Uhura is chased by a Klingon warbird through an uninhabited region of Kronos. It is then ordered to land, followed by Harrison appearing and taking out the Klingon patrol. The cue title is a reference to Kronos Quartet and the Klingon homeworld, Qo'noS, which is pronounced the same way.
7	"Brigadoom"	3:42	John Harrison, in custody aboard the Enterprise, reveals himself to be Khan, as the USS Vengeance confronts the Enterprise.
8	"Ship to Ship"	2:52	Kirk and Khan perform a space jump from the heavily damaged Enterprise to the Vengeance in an attempt to take over the ship and arrest Admiral Alexander Marcus.
9	"Earthbound and Down"	2:39	The Enterprise plunges to Earth. and Kirk and Scotty attempt to reach the engineering sector to repair the warp core.
10	"Warp Core Values"	2:57	Kirk repairs the Enterprise's warp core, suffering from heavy radiation poisoning but saving the ship and her crew in the process.
11	"Buying the Space Farm"	3:18	A dying Kirk is comforted by Spock as the Vengeance plunges past the Enterprise toward San Francisco.
12	"The San Fran Hustle"	5:01	Khan is chased by Spock across the streets of San Francisco and is subdued to have his blood used to revive a dead Kirk. Includes the first notes of the fight music from "Amok Time".
13	"Kirk Enterprises"	3:01	Khan is put back into cryo-sleep as a fully recovered Kirk re-christens the Enterprise at a public event and takes the ship on a five-year exploratory mission. Incorporates the "Theme from Star Trek."
14	"Star Trek Main Theme"	3:26	A re-recording of the film's main theme, incorporating the "Theme from Star Trek."

U.S. bonus track
No.	Title	Writer(s)	Artist	Length
15.	"The Growl"	J. J. Abrams, Charles Scott, Anne Preven, Kassia Conway	Conway	2:56
Total length:				47:17

U.K. bonus track
No.	Title	Writer(s)	Artist	Length
15.	"The Rage That's In Us All"	Abrams, Scott, Bo Bruce, Gary Lightbody	Bo Bruce	2:56
Total length:				47:17

Australian bonus track
No.	Title	Writer(s)	Artist	Length
15.	"The Dark Collide"	Abrams, Scott, Penelope Austin, Robert Conley	Penelope Austin	2:56
Total length:				47:17

French bonus track
No.	Title	Writer(s)	Artist	Length
15.	"(I Wanna) Race With You"	J. J. Abrams, Scott, Nick McKerl, Matthieu Tosi, Laurent Wilthien, Jean Noel Wilthien	We Are I.V	3:16
Total length:				47:37

Mexican bonus track
No.	Title	Writer(s)	Artist	Length
15.	"Noches Estridentes"	J. J. Abrams, Scott, Roxana Puente	Roxana	2:56
Total length:				47:17

Brazilian bonus track
No.	Title	Writer(s)	Artist	Length
15.	"Flashback 92"	Abrams, Scott, Maria do Céu Whitaker Poças	Céu	2:48
Total length:				47:05

Japanese bonus track
No.	Title	Writer(s)	Artist	Length
15.	"Into Darkness"	Abrams, Scott, Yasutaka Nakata	Capsule with Kyary Pamyu Pamyu	3:24
Total length:				47:44

== The Deluxe Edition ==
Star Trek Into Darkness: Music from the Motion Picture

Soundtrack album by Michael Giacchino
- Released: July 28, 2014 (Deluxe Edition)
- Genre: Film score
- Label: Varèse Sarabande
- Producers: Michael Giacchino, J. J. Abrams, Bryan Burk

On July 28, 2014, Varèse Sarabande released a 6000-copy limited edition expansion of Giacchino's score over two discs.

Album cues from the original CD are bolded in the following track listing. Album cues that have been expanded from the original CD are bolded and italicised.

Disc 1:

No.	Title	Length
1.	"**Logos / Pranking The Natives**"	2:58
2.	"**Spock Drops, Kirk Jumps**"	1:43
3.	"Undersea Enterprises Inc."	1:33
4.	"On The Bridge And On The Rocks"	1:42
5.	"**Sub Prime Directive**"	2:23
6.	"**London Calling**"	2:11
7.	"Demotion Emotion"	0:53
8.	"London Falling"	2:33
9.	"The Pride Of Iowa"	0:43
10.	"Astronomical Manhunt"	2:12
11.	"Man vs Blaster"	1:55
12.	"**Meld-Merized**"	2:41
13.	"Admiral Exposition"	3:23
14.	"Personal Space"	0:45
15.	"So Long Scotty"	0:57
16.	"Chief Concern / The Moral Mission"	2:15
17.	"Covert Carol"	0:38
18.	"Galactic Road Trip"	1:16
19.	"Torpedo Diplomacy"	2:19
20.	"Spock And Uhura"	1:05
21.	"**Klingon Chase / Meeting***"	5:03
22.	"**Harrison Attack***"	2:46
23.	"Harrison Brought Onboard"	2:00
24.	"Harjugal Visit"	2:04
25.	"Damage Control"	1:18
26.	"Scotty's Floored"	1:36
27.	"Torpedo Tango"	1:08
28.	"Cryo Your Heart Out"	0:17
29.	"**Harrison's Heart / Enter The Vengeance****"	3:44
30.	"Mom's Calling"	2:19
31.	"You're Not Safe At Warp"	0:35

Disc 2:

No.	Title	Length
1.	"Kirk's Last Stand"	2:24
2.	"Guns Down"	1:07
3.	"Chair Of Command"	0:57
4.	"You Wanna Do What?"	1:58
5.	"Pull The Trigger"	0:27
6.	"**Ship To Ship**"	2:53
7.	"Hallway Fight"	1:33
8.	"Head Games"	1:48
9.	"I'm Gonna Make This Simple"	2:47
10.	"Human Popsicles"	1:18
11.	"**Earthbound And Down**"	4:19
12.	"**Warp Core Values**"	2:57
13.	"Max Thrusters"	0:57
14.	"**Buying The Space Farm**"	3:20
15.	"Go Get 'Em"	1:13
16.	"**The San Fran Hustle**"	5:05
17.	"**Kirk Enterprises**"	2:57
18.	"**End Credits**†"	8:43
19.	"Ode To Harrison"	6:36
20.	"Ode To Vengeance"	6:29

* - Contains material that was present on the original soundtrack as "Kronos Wartet"
** - Contains material that was present on the original soundtrack as "Brigadoom"
† - Contains material that was present on the original soundtrack as "Star Trek Main Theme", and contains "Theme from Star Trek (TV Series)" by Alexander Courage & Gene Roddenberry

== Personnel ==
Credits adopted from Allmusic:

Production

- Michael Giacchino – composer, producer
- Alexander Courage – original material
- Gene Roddenberry – original material
- J. J. Abrams – executive producer
- Bryan Burk – executive producer
- Hollywood Studio Symphony – orchestra
- Reggie Wilson – orchestra contractor
- Page LA Studio Voices – choir/chorus
- Bobbi Page – vocal contractor

Management

- Stacey Robinson – stage manager
- Christine Sirois – stage manager
- Randy Spendlove – executive in charge of music
- Tom Steel – stage manager
- Robert Townson – executive in charge of music

Technical

- Denis St. Amand – scoring engineer
- Vincent Cirilli – Pro Tools
- Joel Iwataki – mixing, recording
- Alex Levy – music editor
- Patricia Sullivan – mastering

Orchestration

- Paul Apelgren – score coordinator
- Marshall Bowen – orchestration
- Andrea Datzman – orchestration, score coordinator
- Brad Dechter – orchestration
- George Drakoulias – music consultant
- Larry Kenton – orchestration
- Jeff Kryka – score preparation
- Tim Lauber – scoring recordist
- Norman Ludwin – orchestration
- Dave Martina – assistant
- Cameron Patrick – orchestration
- Jason Richmond – coordination
- Susie Benchasil Seiter – orchestration
- Tim Simonec – conductor, orchestration
- Booker White – music preparation

== See also ==
- List of Star Trek composers and music
