= Losing Sleep (Axle Whitehead album) =

Studio album by Axle Whitehead
- Released: 23 August 2008
- Recorded: 2007–2008
- Length: 40:08
- Label: Roadshow, Sony BMG
- Producer: Robert Conley; George Muranyi; Carl Dimitaga; Barbara Griffin

Singles from Losing Sleep
- 1. "I Don't Do Surprises" Released: 8 March 2008; 2. "Anywhere" Released: 9 August 2008; 3. "Satellite" Released: November 2008

Losing Sleep is the debut album by Axle Whitehead, released on 23 August 2008. Whitehead began working on material for his debut album shortly after he resigned as host of Video Hits with several songwriters and producers in the twelve months preceding the album's release. The album's first single, "I Don't Do Surprises", became Whitehead's first top ten single, peaking at number eight on the Australian ARIA Singles Chart, and also reached number two on the Australasian singles chart, and was certified Gold by ARIA. The album's second single was "Anywhere". The album's third single was "Satellite".

== Track listing ==
All music is composed by Axle Whitehead

Losing Sleep track listing
No.	Title	Writer(s)	Length
1.	"Satellite"	Axle Whitehead, Robert Conley & Carl Dimitaga	3:25
2.	"I Don't Do Surprises"	Axle Whitehead & Robert Conley	3:14
3.	"You"	Barbara Griffin & Michael 'Fingaz' Mugisha	3:33
4.	"Over to You Now"	Axle Whitehead & Robert Conley	3:24
5.	"Face the Music"	Axle Whitehead & Robert Conley	3:12
6.	"Anywhere"	Robert Conley & James Bryan	3:51
7.	"Losing Sleep"	Axle Whitehead & Robert Conley	3:51
8.	"Landslide"	Robert Conley	3:26
9.	"Waiting for Something to Happen"	Axle Whitehead & Robert Conley	3:04
10.	"Maybe I Was Wrong"	Axle Whitehead & Robert Conley	3:02
11.	"Way Home"	Axle Whitehead & Barbara Griffin	3:52
12.	"Free Man"	Axle Whitehead & Carl Dimitaga	2:22
Total length:			40:08

== Personnel ==
- Axle Whitehead – vocals
- Robert Conley – piano, keyboards and programming
- Carl Dimitaga – guitar and bass guitar except "Landslide" and additional guitars on "Anywhere"
- James Bryan – guitars on "Anywhere"
- Reece Turbin – guitars on "I Don't Do Surprises"
- Terepai Richmond – live drums on "Satellite", "You", "Over to You Now", "Face the Music", "Waiting for Something to Happen" and "Mabe I Was Wrong"
- Axle Whitehead – live drums on "I Don't Do Surprises" and "Free Man"
- George Muranyi – live piano on "You"
- Barbara Griffin – co-producer and engineer on "Way Home", live piano on "You"
- Joe Hamill – guitars on "Way Home"
- Michael "Fingaz" Mugisha – writer, arranger on "You"
- Karin Catt – photography
- Julian Peploe – art direction
- Jane Wallace – packaging design

== Charts ==
Chart performance for Losing Sleep
Chart (2008)	Peak position
Australian Albums (ARIA)	68

== Release history ==
Release history and formats for Losing Sleep
Region	Date	Label	Format	Catalogue
Australia	23 August 2008	Roadshow, Sony BMG	CD, Digital download	3014382
