= The Slips =

UK electronic music duo

- Origin: London, England
- Genres: Electroclash Synth-pop New wave
- Years active: 2007–present
- Label: EMI Records
- Members: David Treahearn; Rob Haggett; James Cooper (live drummer)
- Past members: Ian Townshend (live drummer)
- Website: theslipsmusic.com

The Slips are a UK electronic music duo, composed of David Treahearn and Rob Haggett. James Cooper is the duo's live drummer and regularly DJs in The Slips' Australasian club sets. The duo formed the band in Kentish Town in London, mid-2007 after they met while working together as studio engineers at Olympic Studios in London with artists including Madonna, Björk, The Black Eyed Peas, Gwen Stefani, New Order, Oasis and Massive Attack.

Along with producing original electronic dance music and mixtapes, The Slips are also DJs and remixers having remixed international artists such as Björk The Crystal Fighters, CSS, LCD Soundsystem The XX, I Blame Coco, Phoenix, Kylie Minogue and Ellie Goulding as featured in NME Magazine. They have also remixed artists Gotye, Bertie BlackmanYuksek and Zowie. Their remixes and live performances have seen them featured in UK press including AXM Magazine, The Gay Times, US digital music blog aggregator Hype Machine and Music Week.

As well as regular London live performances, the band performed at Glastonbury Festival in 2009 as part of Q magazine's 'Emerging Talent' program on the Queen's Head stage. In 2010 the UK Music Industry publication The Unsigned Guide wrote the feature article "The Rise Of The Slips: A Roadmap To Learn From"

UK & European live festival performances include the O2 Wireless festival in London's Hyde Park, The Great Escape Festival supporting Alex Metric, Pnau and Adam Freeland the Amsterdam dance event Music Industry conference, the Remix Bubble at Secret Garden Party and in 2011 at The O2 Arena with Kasabian and Bombay Bicycle Club.

The Slips original track "4 Elements to Make Good Music" was the official backing track for the Labrokes Euro 2012 advertising campaign. Ministry Of Sound featured The Slips on the Australian Ministry Of Sound 2012 Annual Compilation for their remix of the Flight Facilities track 'Foreign Language'. In late November 2012, The Slips remix of Björk's track Moon from her album Biophilia was chosen as an official remix for her third remix album Bastards. In 2012, The Slips signed to EMI Records, later releasing the track "Make It Out Alright" featuring Bossy Love with a music video filmed in New York City.
