= Björk: Biophilia Live =

2014 British concert film by Icelandic musician Björk

Biophilia Live
- Official poster
- Directed by: Nick Fenton; Peter Strickland
- Produced by: Jacqui Edenbrow
- Starring: Björk
- Cinematography: Brett Turnbull
- Edited by: Nick Fenton
- Music by: Björk
- Distributed by: Cinema Purgatorio
- Release dates: 26 April 2014 (Tribeca); 17 October 2014
- Running time: 96 minutes
- Country: United Kingdom
- Language: English
- Box office: $433,686

Biophilia Live is a 2014 British concert film by Björk, directed and edited by Peter Strickland and Nick Fenton. The film features Björk performing tracks from her Biophilia tour, which started in June 2011 and ended in September 2013. It was filmed at Alexandra Palace in London on 3 September 2013, and had a theatrical premiere at the Tribeca Film Festival on 26 April 2014 with screenings across the world throughout the same year.

The film was released on home video in three separate editions (3×LP + DVD, 2×CD + DVD, and 2×CD + Blu-ray) on 25 November 2014.

== Background ==
The Biophilia tour began on 27 June 2011 at the Manchester International Festival and spanned 3 years. Several innovate instruments were created and utilized for the tour, including a musical Tesla coil, a midi-controlled gamelan-celesta hybrid, a pendulum harp and perhaps the concert's most unwieldy instrument, The Sharpsichord created by Henry Dagg in the UK. Björk chose a very specific format for the tour to show off all the instruments and create an intimate feeling: she and the musicians would be on a circular stage at the center of the venue and the audience would form all around them, free to move about and get a look at the various instruments placed throughout different parts of the stage.

== Production ==
The film was shot on a mixture of Alexa and Red Epic cameras.

"In my mind we were clearly there to serve Björk's vision,” continued Strickland. He initially wanted to use nature photography from the 1970s but revealed that Björk “was cautious of going down a retro path. She didn’t want to have a romantic view of nature. She wanted something modern and clinical... For me, it’s about marveling at the universe on an infinite and microscopic level and finding these connections. We tried to introduce this by having highly magnified tissue cells and linking them with overhead shots of forests and sand dunes. Visually they almost look identical.”

Nick Fenton revealed that they did not take inspiration from famous concert films of the past like D. A. Pennebaker's Monterey Pop or the Maysles brothers' Gimme Shelter, instead choosing to do "something that was true to what [Björk's] works represents."

During the night of the concert at Alexandra Palace on 3 September 2013, several songs were retaken to perfect them for filming, including "Sonnets/Unrealities XI" and "Sacrifice", the only song to use The Sharpsichord on the tour. Björk explained that they were only just getting familiar with the instrument as The Sharpsichord's size and weight prevented it from traveling. Despite its difficulties, Strickland revealed it was his favorite of the instruments utilized for the Biophilia tour.

== Release ==
Biophilia Live

Live album / video album by Björk
- Released: 24 November 2014
- Recorded: 3 September 2013
- Venues: Alexandra Palace (London, United Kingdom)
- Length: 96:35
- Label: One Little Independent Records

Björk chronology
Bastards (2012)	Biophilia Live (2014)	Vulnicura (2015)

Björk video chronology
When Björk Met Attenborough (2014)	Biophilia Live (2014)	Vulnicura VR (2019)

The film had its world premiere on 26 April 2014 at the Tribeca Film Festival. The film's trailer debuted on YouTube on 14 August 2014 before the movie played at a variety of venues and dates around the world, including the Downtown Independent in Los Angeles. On 7 October 2014, Bjork skipped the British premiere at the BFI London Film Festival because she was busy working on her follow up to Biophilia, 2015's critically acclaimed Vulnicura.

The concert film was released on CD, 3xLP, DVD and Blu-ray on 25 November 2014. The same content with all the sound effects accompanying the super imposed images is carried over throughout all the formats, as is David Attenborough's narration over the opening track "Oskasteinn". However, the release is not the first live material from Biophilia to be available officially. The special Manual and Ultimate Art Editions of the original studio album contained a bonus disc of 15 songs performed live at the Manchester International Festival from June and July 2011. However, that original CD contains performances of Björk's prior to her vocal chord surgery in late 2012.

== Reception ==
Rotten Tomatoes gave the film a score of 77% based on reviews from 22 critics, with an average score of 6.7/10. The critics consensus states, "Walk through an enchanted forest and what do you see? Björk: Biophilia Live, an eclectic delivery of audio technical divinity." Metacritic, another review aggregator, assigned the film a weighted average score of 67 (out of 100) based on 6 reviews from mainstream critics, considered to be "generally favorable reviews".

== Track listings ==
Björk: Biophilia Live – DVD/Blu-ray
No.	Title	Writer(s)	Length
1.	"Óskasteinn" (Narrated by David Attenborough, sung by Graduale Nobili)	Traditional	2:50
2.	"Thunderbolt"	Björk; Oddný Eir Ævarsdóttir	5:22
3.	"Moon"	Björk	6:05
4.	"Crystalline"	Björk	5:12
5.	"Hollow"	Björk	6:00
6.	"Dark Matter"	Björk; Mark Bell	3:05
7.	"Hidden Place"	Björk	5:48
8.	"Virus"	Sjón; Björk	5:36
9.	"Possibly Maybe"	Björk	5:07
10.	"Mouth's Cradle"	Björk	4:17
11.	"Isobel"	Björk; Marius de Vries; Nellee Hooper; Sjón	6:12
12.	"Sonnets / Unrealities XI"	Björk; E. E. Cummings	2:03
13.	"Mutual Core"	Björk	5:18
14.	"Cosmogony"	Sjón; Björk	5:23
15.	"Solstice"	Sjón; Björk	5:44
16.	"One Day"	Björk	7:10
17.	"Náttúra"	Björk	3:32
18.	"Declare Independence"	Björk; Bell	4:55
19.	"Sacrifice"	Björk	5:18
20.	"Bat Sounds" (by Jeremy Deller, end credits)	Jeremy Deller	1:39
Total length:			96:35

Bonus feature
No.	Title	Director(s)	Length
21.	"Biophilia at Miraikan"	Josef O'Connor	8:10
Total length:			104:45

Notes

- The CD and audio streaming edition splits the tracks into two discs; Tracks 1–10 on disc 1, tracks 11–20 on disc 2.

== Charts ==
Chart (2014)	Peak position
Italian Music DVD (FIMI)	2
