= When Björk Met Attenborough =

2013 television film

- Title card
- Directed by: Louise Hooper
- Starring: Björk; David Attenborough
- Narrated by: Tilda Swinton
- Countries of origin: England; Iceland
- Original language: English

Production
- Executive producer: Lucas Ochoa
- Producer: Caroline Page
- Running time: 47 minutes
- Production companies: Pulse Films; One Little Indian Records

Original release
- Network: Channel 4
- Release: 27 July 2013

When Björk Met Attenborough is a 2013 documentary television film directed by Louise Hooper, executive produced by Lucas Ochoa and produced by Caroline Page. It was aired for the first time on 27 July 2013 on Channel 4, in conjunction with Pulse Films and One Little Indian Records. Partly filmed at the Natural History Museum in London, the documentary features an encounter between Icelandic singer-songwriter and musician Björk and English broadcaster and naturalist David Attenborough. They discuss the nature of music and the intersection between music, nature and technology. It also follows the singer as she prepares for her Biophilia tour, along with rehearsal and studio recording.

The documentary was inspired by the singer's eighth studio album Biophilia (2011), which was released as a series of apps which blends nature elements with musicology. Collaborators in the project Scott Snibbe, Damian Taylor, and Andy Cavatorta appear in the documentary to talk about their role in the development of the album and the live show. It also includes neurologist Oliver Sacks, who talks about the effect of music on the brain.

Despite the low ratings, the show received positive to moderate reviews from critics, who applauded the content of the documentary but, in some cases, criticised the interaction between Attenborough and Björk, which was considered "awkward" and "unlikely". The documentary was released on DVD and Blu-ray on 5 May 2014.

== Cast ==
In order of appearance:

- Björk
- Graduale Nobili
- David Attenborough
- Henry Dagg
- Matt Robertson
- Oliver Sacks
- Andy Cavatorta
- Scott Snibbe
- Tilda Swinton – Narrator

== Background and release ==
When Björk Met Attenborough

Video by Björk
- Released: 5 May 2014

Björk chronology
Later with Jools Holland 1995–2011 (2012)	When Björk Met Attenborough (2014)	Björk: Biophilia Live (2014)

When the Biophilia project was first unveiled, it was announced that a documentary including footage of studio recording, interviews and rehearsal for the live performances, which would culminate in the first live performance at the Manchester International Festival, was in the works. While the original idea for the documentary never materialised, the project evolved as a mutual collaboration between David Attenborough and Björk herself. On 1 August 2012, it was reported that UK Channel 4 had signed a deal to air a documentary, tentatively titled Attenborough and Björk: The Nature of Music, that would have included a discussion between the two about the story of music, human's relationship with it and how technology could evolve the way we engage with it. The documentary was inspired by the Biophilia project and would have featured footage commented by Attenborough, along with a showcase of the instruments created for the Biophilia tour. British-American neurologist Oliver Sacks was also reported to appear in the documentary, explaining "the extraordinary and beneficial effects music has on our brains". The documentary, made by the company Pulse Films, is the first time the British television channel and the company had collaborated. It was directed by Louise Hooper and executive produced by Lucas Ochoa, who commented about the project:

"Born from Bjork's revolutionary music project we are thrilled to be able to document this incredible journey with her; she is undeniably one of the most iconic figures in popular culture and truly pushes boundaries like no other artist does."

The English naturalist had previously provided the spoken introduction for the live shows and the apps. The two had long admired each other's works. In an interview with Rolling Stone, Björk had confessed that, when she was a kid, she considered Attenborough her "rock star". Attenborough stated that the singer "is really quite enchanting" and called her "honey" during the filming, reportedly because he could not pronounce her name properly. Björk stated about the experience of the filming with Attenborough: "He would close off and take in whatever I was saying, and then just come out with the most beautifully formed sentences you ever heard". Director Hooper, whose father John had filmed Attenborough in different documentaries settled in Papua New Guinea, Mali and the Amazon rainforest, had stated:

"There is an unexpected chemistry and fun between these two unique characters. They are both icons of their own separate worlds of music and nature, and both excited and curious to explore how these two worlds come together. Seeing Bjork and Sir David laughing and engaging with each other on screen is simply magical, it was fascinating to have the chance to bring Sir David and Bjork together for the first time on television. They were both great fun to work with; Bjork fizzing with ideas for the film and Sir David bringing his passion and knowledge".

The documentary was scheduled to air during November 2012 and to see a later limited cinema release in an extended cut. As of November 2012, the documentary was still in the editing. In June 2013, it was reported that the documentary would have its worldwide premiere at the Cortona Mix Festival in Italy. The festival then cancelled the projection. The documentary first aired on Channel 4 on 27 July 2013 as part of a series of documentaries called Mad4Music, now titled When Björk Met Attenborough.

When a crowdfunding was created on Kickstarter to fund the release of Biophilia on Android, one of the reward available for the backers who would have pledged £120 or more was one early viewing DVD copy of the documentary. After Björk had found a cheaper way to transport the apps on Android, the funding was cancelled. On 21 March 2014, it was announced that the documentary would be released on 5 May 2014 on DVD and Blu-ray. Before the release of the DVD, the documentary was shown for three nights at the MK2 Grand Palais in Paris, and it was also shown during the We Love Green festival.

== Synopsis ==
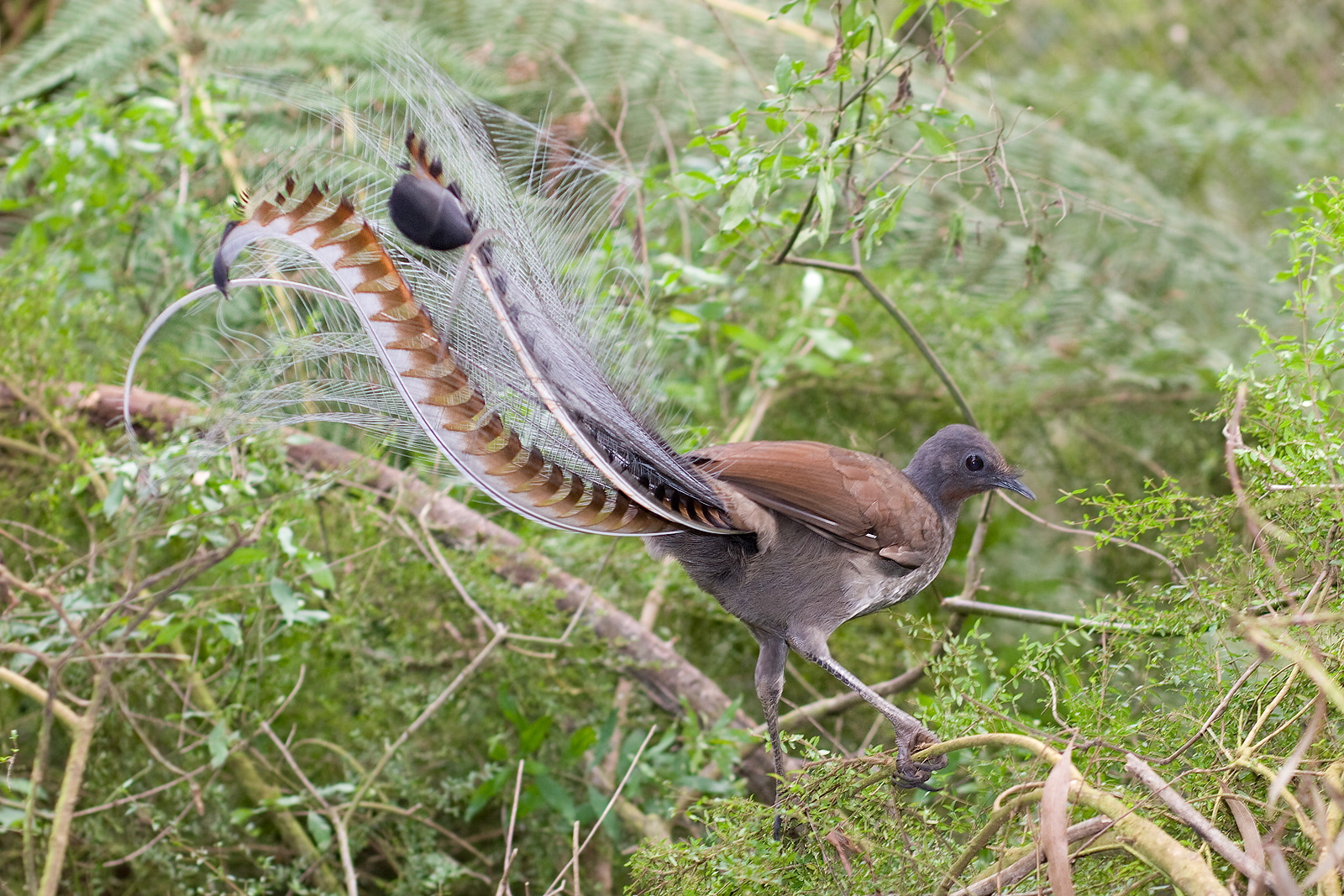
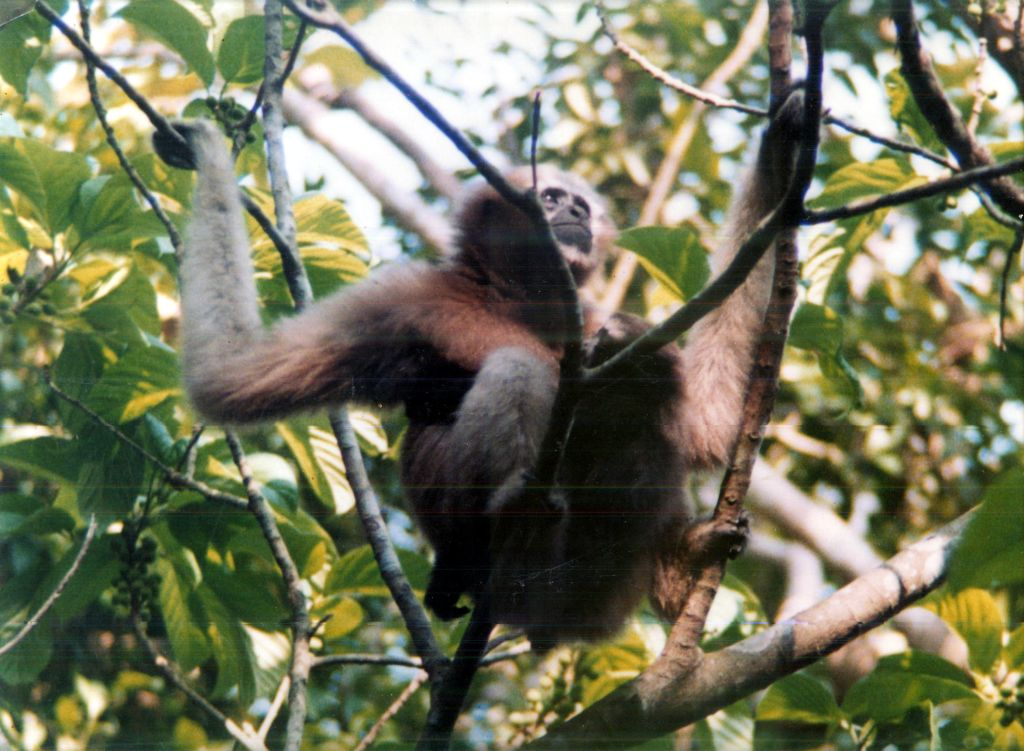
In the documentary, music in nature is explained through the help of examples like the Lyrebird (left) and the Gibbon (right).

The documentary opens with an introduction by Tilda Swinton, who gives a backstory about Björk's career and her intention with the Biophilia project, stating that the singer conceived the project wanting to redefine music in the 21st century. Images from the "Moon and "Mutual Core" music videos accompany her speech. After that, some frames focus on the Graduale Nobili who are singing the backing vocals to "Thunderbolt" on a cliff in front of the ocean in Iceland. Thereafter the scene shifts to an early rehearsal of the Biophilia songs in Iceland during November 2010. The choir begin to learn their parts in "Thunderbolt" and "Moon" under the guide of the singer. After that, the documentary shows the encounter between Björk and Sir David Attenborough in the Natural History Museum in London. There, the naturalist and the singer discuss about the nature of music. They first talk about the importance of music and singing in the nature, with Attenborough explaining how music works for birds like the bird-of-paradise and the lyrebird, whose chirping is defined by the naturalist the "most complex sound ever", and he goes on by stating that the bird has developed an "impressive vocal range" which he compares to that of Björk. Attenborough states that the human larynx is capable of many more sounds that preceded language. Therefore, the singer asks him how he thinks music works for the modern people, and the naturalist explains how he thinks popular music is "extremely sexual", comparing popular music to medieval troubadors, and that is why is so relatable to young people and animals, i.e. the gibbons, which mate by singing together out of excitement. Attenborough affirms that "the mystery is how music has been used by humanity for something that is transcendental".

Footage from another rehearsal with the choir singing "Dark Matter" are shown before shifting to the encounter between Björk and Henry Dagg in a metal workshop. Dagg had created the Sharpsichord, a solar powered cross between a harp and a barrel organ, which Björk wanted to incorporate in one song. They are shown rehearsing "Sacrifice" and discussing the composition of the song. Attenborough states that our emotion comes from nature and that a composer has to be in contact with it. He then manages to compare the sound of Benjamin Britten's Sea interludes (which is playing in the background) to the sound of waves. The natural structure of music inspires Björk who wants to bring nature in her composition. To discuss "Crystalline", Björk and Attenborough go to the crystal room of the museum. They talk about the mathematical basis of Björk's songs, who explains the time signatures of the verses and the chorus of "Crystalline" and compares the composition of a crystal to that of a song. Scenes from the choir recording parts of "Crystalline" guided by Biophilia musical director Matt Robertson are shown. Attenborough thinks that the beauty of mathematics can be heard in composition like the "Fugue 5" by Johann Sebastian Bach. Swinton tells how universe is made of patterns which are present in music but that we can't visualise, and how Björk wants to change that. Because of that, the singer collaborates with Evan Grant, who works with cymatics. Grant explains how the Chladni plate works, and that he appreciates how Björk tries to bring a real meaning in her music by taking a "scientific and realistic approach" to it. Grant tries to use cymatics on water for "Crystalline", which results can be seen in the music video for the song (directed by Michel Gondry).

Swinton explains how Björk's aim is to bring nature on stage for the Biophilia performance. Footage from the final rehearsal at Campfield Market Hall in Manchester for Biophilia world premiere at the Manchester International Festival is shown, with the Sharpsichord arriving at the venue. Some of other instruments used during the show are presented, like MIDI-controlled Tesla coil, invented by Nikola Tesla, and a gravity-harnessed pendulum harp invented by Andy Cavatorta of the Massachusetts Institute of Technology. Cavatorta recounts how Björk declared to him that she wanted nature to appear like "some sort of a rock star on stage", and tells that the first prototypes of the instruments were filmed and shown to Björk before she approved the final result. In one of the prototypes video the inventor puts a figurine of Björk (as pictured in the Volta album cover) between the swings. The instrument, created solely for the "Solstice" performance, was commissioned because, as Björk declares, the singer "got obsessed" with basslines (she hums a bassline of a composition by John Tavener as she says so).

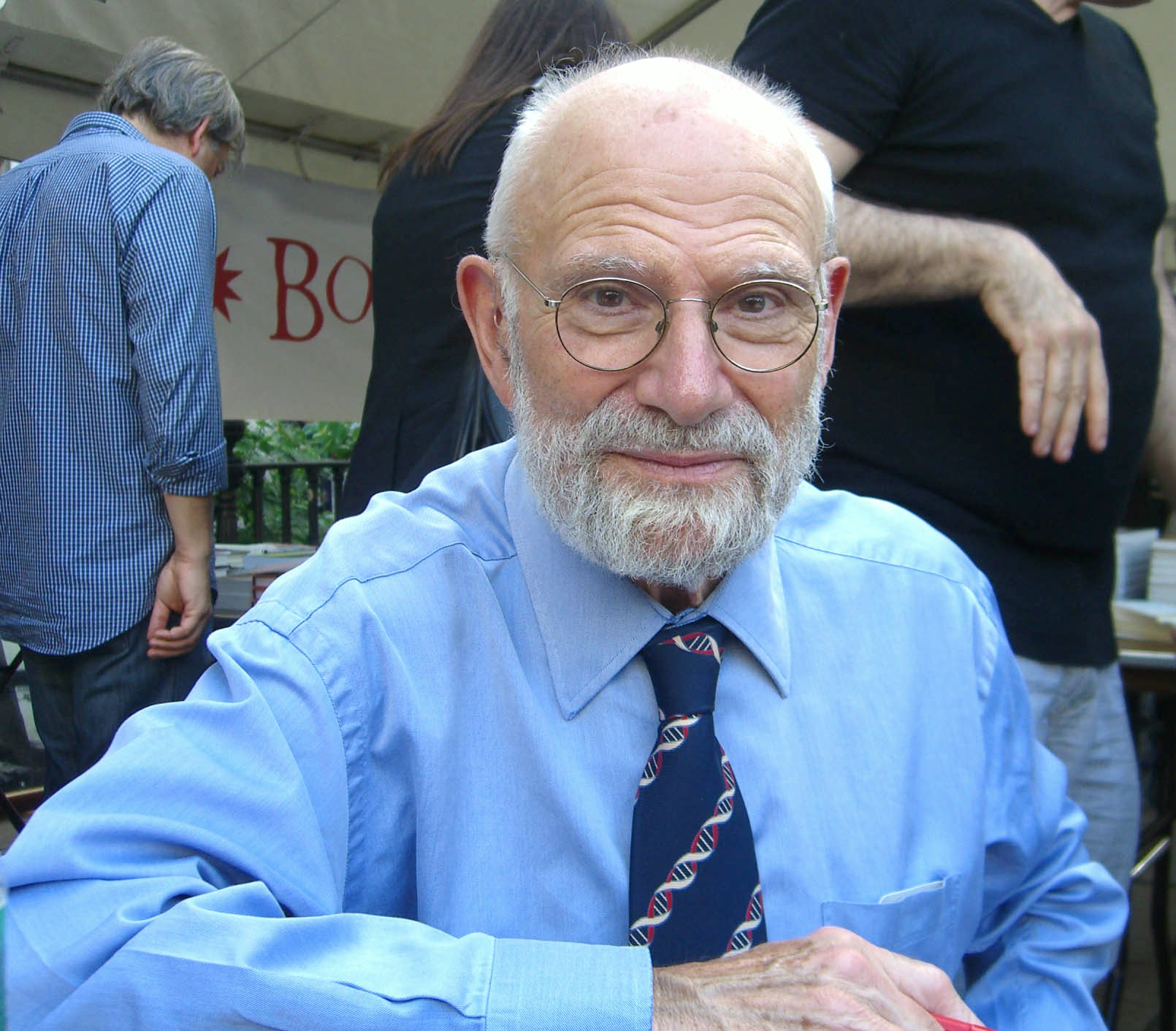
Neurologist Oliver Sacks (left) provides multiple insights of the relation between human brain and behaviours and music, while media artist Scott Snibbe (right) explains the apps included on the Biophilia album.

One of the major inspiration of the project itself, neurologist Oliver Sacks, who Björk defines as the "David Attenborough of the brain", lists the benefits music has on human and explains how when a human listens to music every part of the brain gets involved. This is very useful to people who suffers from dementia, who need evocative music which can help them in building a bridge to their past. Scenes from a nursing home, in which various patients with dementia are shown to benefit from different music played to them, accompany Sacks' speech. He affirms that the music expresses something that language can't.

Scenes from the first performance of Biophilia are shown. David Attenborough's intro, which accompany the show, is partially heard, while Björk affirms that music is a catalyst between the outer world and the inner world. A performance of "Thunderbolt" is partially shown, during which the singer is seen wearing a dress by Michael van der Ham, along with a big red wig, while the Tesla coil plays on stage. Swinton states that Biophilia "nature, music and technology come together" and that the Icelandic singer wants to develop a new kind of music-making which is "intuitive and accessible for everyone". This is driven by her desire to change we think of music, because, as the singer herself explains, by recounting her musical education, the "academic approach to music is a barrier to people actually making music". Oliver Sacks agrees with her by stating that the sheet music and the keys of a piano are "intimidating and much more complicated than language". Because of that, the singer tries to use technology to make it more intuitive. As a consequence of this, Björk works with Damian Taylor. Taylor tries to use a ball and a cardboard box, along with a gamepad, instead of a keyboard. Björk's solution came with the diffusion of tablet computer, which touch screen the singer compares to a tambourine for its being spontaneous and instinctive. By developing this idea, she decides to make a different format of album, made with apps. She works with interactive media artist Scott Snibbe, who states that her aim is the turn music "into something full sensory".

Björk explains some of the apps that are part of the album, like "Moon", which app deals with sequences, "Mutual Core", in which chords are represented with strata, and "Thunderbolt", which use lightnings as visual representation of arpeggios. Björk states that a famous example of arpeggio is "I Feel Love" by Donna Summer. Snibbe then affirms that, "if we change the visual representation, the way in which people think about music is changed". To engage people with her new conception of music, Björk rolls out a programme of music workshops for children in school around the world (footage from a workshop in Buenos Aires is shown) which, as Swinton informs, is now a standard part of the music curriculum in Iceland. Björk confesses that she always dreamt about running a music school and that she considers this project her music school. After one year from the first show in Manchester, the Biophilia tour reaches the World Sacred Music Festival in Fes, Morocco, during which Björk is seen performing "Cosmogony". Sacks finally states that "music unify people at an elementary level". The documentary ends with a final conversation between Björk and Attenborough, in which the naturalist affirms:

"Music, to be most rewarding, [...] does require work, and does require concentration, does require thought, which is why your music is so challenging, because it does require thought. So much of what you do, is completely new, [and] hasn't been done by people before, and that's what's challenging about that. So, if you're very tired, I don't suggest that they put on your music. I put on your music when I really want to think about something."

To which Björk blushes, and then the pair laugh together. The end credits roll to "Cosmogony" in the background.

== Reception ==
=== Critical reviews ===
The documentary received moderately positive reviews. According to Ceri Radford of The Telegraph, who gave the documentary 4 stars out of 5, "the documentary brought together the revered naturalist and the swan-donning Icelandic singer for an inspiring if at times confusing symposium on the relationship between music, technology and the natural world". The journalist praised Biophilia by affirming that "the whole idea was tantalisingly tangled" and that "any single aspect of Biophilia would have made for a fascinating documentary in its own right", while defining the parts with Oliver Sacks "touching" and concluding "from footage of spinning stars to shoals of fish to the snow-speckled hills above Reykjavík, from the sound of crackling electricity to Björk's soaring voice, there was a dreamy and unsettling evocation of awe. It might not all have made sense, but it was a delight to the senses." Jordan Morgan of Tomorrow's News defined the couple "the most unlikely expectations of collaborations" but goes on by stating "When Bjork met David Attenborough is a fascinating, albeit slightly confusing, documentary that joins the translucent dots between humans, nature and music and provides for an extremely informative learning lesson, [...] as well as creating something new to hear, Björk also sets out to create a visual image for what people are hearing, adding another dimension to what you hear". Sam Wollaston of The Guardian wrote that, although he "[doesn't] always totally understand what she's on about, [...] the bits with David Attenborough at the Natural History Museum are lovely", and later compared their interaction to "an old man showing his granddaughter round his favourite place in the world" but found Björk "a little bit shy with him" and "grand-daughterly". Caitlin Moran of The Times called the duo "a proper super-hero pairing". Ian Cross, professor of music and science of the University of Cambridge, commented about the documentary: "if there has to be something about music on television on a Saturday evening, I'd rather hear the views of Björk and David Attenborough than those of the music hedge fund manager Simon Cowell".

Mike Higgins, who gave the show 2 stars out of 5, writing on The Independent, billed the encounter as "awkward" and gave a negative review of the documentary, finding it "[not] much more than a promo for Björk's last album, Biophilia, and its tour" and further stating: "The 87-year-old doesn't so much speak in complete paragraphs as lectures in complete chapters. In their conversations – on crystallography, the power of the human larynx, et al – Attenborough was in transmit mode, jabbing away with his index finger. All Björk could do was chip in now and then, in her Reykjavík by way of south London accent. When the big man let rip on the notion that all "song" in the natural word is about sex, and so, therefore, is popular music, Björk reacted as we all did, I suspect, and looked a bit embarrassed."

=== Ratings ===
The documentary pulled 528,000 viewers during its original outing at 7 p.m. with a viewing share of 3.15%. It failed to match Channel 4 average slot score of 864,000 viewers and 4.11% share for the previous 12 months. It got beaten by a rerun of the 2012 Summer Olympics opening ceremony on BBC Three, which got 825,000 viewers with an average share of 4.5%.
