= Bastards (Björk album) =

Remix album by Björk
- Released: 19 November 2012
- Recorded: 2008–2011
- Length: 68:20
- Label: One Little Indian
- Producers: Björk; Mark Bell; Omar Souleyman; Hudson Mohawke; Death Grips; These New Puritans; Matthew Herbert; 16bit; Alva Noto; The Slips; Current Value

Björk chronology
Biophilia (2011)	Bastards (2012)	Biophilia Live (2014)

Professional ratings
Aggregate scores
Source	Rating
AnyDecentMusic?	6.9/10
Metacritic	72/100
Review scores
Source	Rating
Aesthetic Magazine	3.5/5 stars
Consequence of Sound	3.5/5 stars
Pitchfork	5.2/10 stars

Bastards is the third remix album by Icelandic artist Björk, it was released on 19 November 2012. The album features remixes of tracks from her seventh studio album, Biophilia (2011). All of the remixes were previously released on The Crystalline Series or the Biophilia Remix Series, and they were all remastered by Mandy Parnell.

== Background ==
Although all tracks had already been released, Björk "felt it important to gather together the essence of the remixes" so she "picked a quarter of them for one CD for people who are perhaps not too sassy [sic] downloaders or don't have the time or energy to partake in the hunter-gathering rituals of the internet". The cover features the 'strata' avatar featuring Björk's face that was designed by director Andrew Thomas Huang for the "Mutual Core" music video.

== Track listing ==
All tracks are written by Björk and the listed co-writers. All tracks produced by Björk and the listed co-producers.

No.	Title	Writer(s)	Producer(s)	Length
1.	"Crystalline" (Omar Souleyman Remix)		16bit (adaptation by Omar Souleyman)	6:39
2.	"Virus" (Hudson Mohawke Peaches and Guacamol Remix)	Sjón	(remix by Hudson Mohawke)	4:49
3.	"Sacrifice" (Death Grips Remix)		(remix by Death Grips)	4:17
4.	"Sacrifice" (Matthew Herbert's Pins and Needles Mix Edit)		(remix and additional production by Matthew Herbert)	0:37
5.	"Mutual Core" (These New Puritans Remix featuring Solomon Islands Song)		(remix by These New Puritans)	3:54
6.	"Hollow" (16bit Remix)		16bit (remix by 16bit)	7:00
7.	"Mutual Core" (Matthew Herbert's Tectonic Plates Mix)		(remix and additional production by Matthew Herbert)	5:05
8.	"Thunderbolt" (Death Grips Remix)	Oddný Eir Ævarsdóttir	(remix by Death Grips)	5:04
9.	"Dark Matter" (Alva Noto Remodel)	Mark Bell	(remix by Alva Noto)	5:40
10.	"Thunderbolt" (Omar Souleyman Remix)	Oddný Eir	(adaptation by Omar Souleyman)	7:23
11.	"Solstice" (Current Value Remix)	Sjón	(remix by Current Value)	6:28
12.	"Moon" (The Slips Remix)	Damian Taylor	(remix by The Slips)	6:07
13.	"Crystalline" (Matthew Herbert Mix)		16bit (remix by Matthew Herbert)	5:17

Sample credits

- "Mutual Core" (These New Puritans Remix featuring Solomon Islands Song) includes samples from the traditional composition "Funeral Song (Solomon Islands 1978)", as extracted from the album Spirit of Melanesia by David Fanshawe.

== Charts ==
Chart performance for Bastards
Chart (2012)	Peak position
Belgian Albums (Ultratop Wallonia)	154
Japan Albums (Oricon)	134
UK Albums (OCC)	199
UK Independent Albums (OCC)	30
