= Mutual Core =

Song by Björk

from the album Biophilia
- Released: 7 February 2012
- Recorded: 2011
- Genre: Experimental; electronica
- Length: 4:57
- Label: One Little Indian
- Songwriter: Björk
- Producer: Björk

"Mutual Core" is a song recorded by Icelandic singer Björk for her seventh studio album Biophilia (2011). It was written and produced by Björk herself, while programming and beats were made in collaboration with Matthew Herbert and the English dubstep band 16bit. "Mutual Core" is an uptempo experimental song. Its music includes Pipe organ, electronica-tinged sounds and features the Choir Graduale Nobili, the choir featured on Biophilia. The song's lyrics are a metaphor for human relationships, compared to the structure of the Earth and Plate tectonics. The song was well received by contemporary music critics, who praised its production and beats, moreover appreciating Björk's voice on the track.

As with all the songs on Biophilia, an app was made for the song, which features a video game in which the player have to move geological layers as an accordion to play chords. Though the song wasn't released as a single, a music video was produced, directed by Andrew Thomas Huang. The video was critically applauded and received further attention when it got projected for one month in Times Square in 2013, and then across the 7 continents. Björk promoted the song by performing it throughout her Biophilia tour.

Three remixes by Matthew Herbert, 16bit and These New Puritans were released as part of Biophilia Remix Series. The Matthew Herbert's and the These New Puritans remixes were later included on bastards (2012). In July 2012, the online music store Beatport announced a fan contest in which "Mutual Core" had to be remixed, to be released afterwards on a remix package.

== Background ==
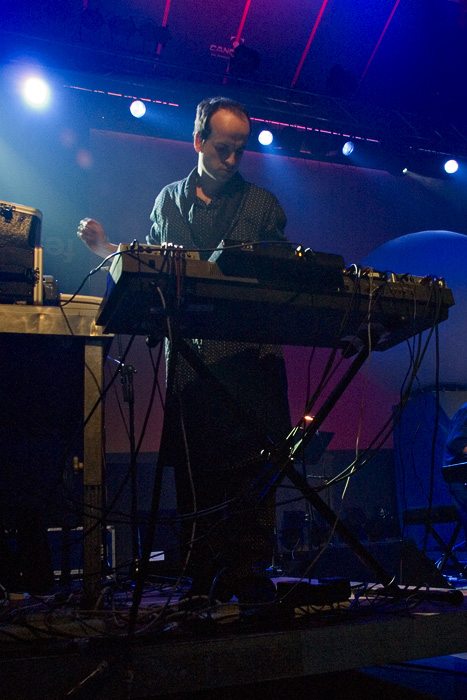
Matthew Herbert provided beat and programming for the song which he also remixed.

At the end of 2010, Björk confirmed she was working on a new album. In an interview published on Fréttablaðið, the singer stated that the project was midway through the completion and that she hoped to go on tour before the end of 2011. The project was officialised in March 2011, with the announcement of Björk performance at Manchester International Festival. The project, called Biophilia, comprises a series of live performances, a new website, a documentary and a series of apps, besides the release as a music album which is partly composed on an iPad. The Biophilia tour was said to be touring eight cities for three years and to be including a series of workshops for children in collaboration with local schools. The first details about "Mutual Core" came regarding its app, which was described to allow users to "arrange geological layers to form chords".

"Eruptions and earthquakes, the building of continents, the formation of mountain ranges and oceanic trenches, all are powerful geological signs of earth's underlying structure and mechanics. In Mutual Core earth's geology is transformed into a metaphor for human relationships. Opposing forces of compression and release, central to continent building and to human feelings, are expressed sonically, and in the app, by the contrast between the shifting of chords in the verse and uplifting chorus. The contrast can also be seen in the contrasting visual patterns of the animation, and is evoked by Björk's working title for this track, 'organ plaid', which describes an interwoven musical fabric. While the song's themes are universal, the lyrics indicate a specific, autobiographically significant geographical region: the boundary of the north american and eurasian tectonic plates, on which sits Björk's birthplace —Iceland."

— Presentation of the song on the official App.

"Mutual Core" was written and produced by Björk, while the beat of the song was made in collaboration with Matthew Herbert and 16bit. The song was engineered by Damian Taylor and Sveinn Kjartansson, with mixing provided by Taylor and Björk. "Mutual Core"'s lyrics were inspired by human relationships and by Björk's family decisions, who had to decide where her daughter, Ísadóra, would go to school between New York City and Reykjavík. Björk felt that the song is "the most personal [on the album] for me". David Fricke of Rolling Stone noted that "Björk likens the human emotions – love, physical obsession, changing moods, violent hurt – in songs such as "Mutual Core", "Moon" and "Virus" to natural phenomena: earthquakes, volcanic eruptions, lunar phases and contagious disease".

Three official remixes of the song have been released. The first one was released on Biophilia Remix Series VI on 25 June 2012, and it is a remix by long time-collaborator Matthew Herbert. Björk stated about Herbert's remixes: "He has taken it full on and made it into his version but still true to the heart of the song and, more than once, improved it". RJ Cubarrubia of Rolling Stone commented that the remix "builds slowly with background bleeps and opaque textures before erupting into a cacophonous rumble". The second one is a remix by 16bit, which was released as part of Biophilia Remix Series VII on July 9, 2012. This version had already been released as part of a promo for Icelandair flights, playing the song in flights to Iceland during Björk's concert residency in Reykjavik in Summer 2011. Other two remixes of "Crystalline" and "Sacrifice" were played. The last remix by These New Puritans has been on November 12, 2012 on Biophilia Remix Series VIII. The remix includes samples from the Traditional composition "Funeral Song (Solomon Islands 1978)", as extracted from the album Spirit of Melanesia by David Fanshawe. On October 8, 2012, the track list for bastards was announced, and the Matthew Herbert's and the These New Puritans remixes were included. On late July 2012, Beatport announced a contest in which the participants had to remix "Mutual Core". The winner would have their remix released on One Little Indian Records in a remix package to be sold on the website. The winner was announced on 18 September 2012, as "Breakwave". This remix, later renamed "Waxx Crooks Remix", was released on December 10, 2012.

== Composition ==
"Mutual Core"
A 29 second sample of "Mutual Core", in which the musical shift between the verse and the chorus can be heard.

"Mutual Core" is an uptempo experimental song, which displays elements from electro, techno, glitch, breakcore and ambient, and includes also a choral part during the chorus. The rhythm of the song can be roughly divided into two distinct parts: the verses, which feature moderately sparse electronic beats and a time signature of 5/4, and the choruses, which display more upbeat sounds and a 2/4 time signature. According to Mark Diver of BBC Music during the shift from the verse and the chorus the song "slips from blissful ambience into bombastic electronic percussion, leaving the senses reeling, only to fade back into a comforting lilt".

The instrumentation of the verses includes a pipe organ. Sound designer David Paterson described the way Björk wanted the music on "Mutual Core": "Bjork described the sounds she wanted in a way that left it very open to interpretation. With the track "Mutual Core", for example, she described how it was about magnetic attraction – which doesn't really have a sound that springs to mind". Luke Turner of NME noted that "[Björk's] voice cracks against the increasing, insistent power of the electronic rhythms, as if recognising our human insignificance in the face of geology", citing the verse "As fast as your fingernail grows / The Atlantic ridge drifts" as an example, and, on a similar note, Odile De Plas of Télérama found the singer's voice "strong, acrobat, guttural and [...] crystalline".

The musical shift occurs when the singer pronounces the words "Core", during which, as described by Nikki Debben in her essay included in the Manual Edition of Biophilia, the "modality switches from minor to major". The lecturer noted that "the close, dark sound of the verse is partly due to the minor mode which has a flattened third degree, compared to the brighter sound of the chorus in the major mode which has the "normal" third degree of the chord". This part of the song uses a Plagal cadence, which involves a movement "from a chord built on the fourth degree of the scale to one built on the first degree of the scale". The chorus of the song features a vocal crescendo performed by the choir, which juxtaposes with breakcore-influenced beats, which display elements from dub. Chris Chafin of Capital compared the sound of the chorus to the work of The Chemical Brothers and stated that tracks like "Crystalline" and "Mutual Core" recall previous works from Björk's discography, especially Post (1995) and Homogenic (1997).

== Critical reception ==
The song was generally well received by music critics, who cited it as a highlight of the album. According to Mark Pytlik of Pitchfork, the song "may be the album's best track overall", citing "its satisfyingly filthy electro skronk", while giving the album an average review; on a similar note, Arnold Pan of PopMatters defined the song as "the album's most viscerally powerful number" citing that "that's music that sounds just as at home in the sacred place of a vast cathedral as it is in the virtual vacuum of cyberspace". Gareth James of Clash praised the album and stated that "when the machine-gun beats do break through on "Mutual Core", they're augmented by a hymnal organ riff and a soaring, unprocessed and unleashed vocal which will leave you breathless".

"Mutual Core" was described as "best" and "climactic" by Helen Brown of The Daily Telegraph, which elected Biophilia as the CD of the Week, and "literally volcanic" by Heather Phares of Allmusic. Jim Fusilli of The Wall Street Journal stated that the track is "earthbound". According to the Daily Mirror review, the track "adds angry rebuke and glitchy distorted power chordings to the shimmering, ringing percussion and natural awe that feature on the astonishing tracks "Virus" and aptly named "Crystalline"". Alexis Petridis of The Guardian praised the composition of the album and stated "There's something audacious and impressive about the way "Hollow" attempts to strike a weird balance between menace and calm, the vocals as lulling as the staccato backing is unsettling. Or "Mutual Core"'s repeated shifts from a wheezing keyboard – it was doubtless built in a laboratory by the provost of the Massachusetts Institute of Technology and professor Brian Cox, but it sounds like a 13th-century portative organ – to electronic bombardment". Möhammed Choudhery of Consequence of Sound analysed the use of Björk's voice in the album, stating:

Her unique utility of the English language gives her words a quirky, idiosyncratic edge, allowing lines like "if you forget my name, you'll go astray/ like a killer whale" to ring somehow striking. Said masterstrokes and quirks are well intact here, as is evident in the asteroid-bass volley of "Mutual Core" and lead single "Crystalline"'s apocalyptical breakbeat coda. Biophilia's finest moments are its most subtly captivating, many of which are (admittedly) almost forgettable on first listen. The aforementioned "Mutual Core" and "Crystalline" can be assured a spot on any and all future Best of Björk compilations, compelling in how they blend archaic instrumentation with blistering electronica.

Despite this, some critics dubbed the song as "tedious" and "interesting but not surprising". Andy Gill of The Independent gave a negative review of the album, praising only the choral elements, stating that: "they're a constant delight as she reflects upon her desire for the "dangerous gifts" of elemental nature, the lightning-flash of creative inspiration ("Thunderbolt"); muses about being a bead threaded upon a DNA chain ("Hollow"); explores the ethically neutral, natural attraction of parasite to host ("Virus"); admires the creative force of volcanic energy ("Mutual Core")".

== App ==
A still from the "Mutual Core" app

As with all the songs on Biophilia, "Mutual Core" was released as an app for iPhone or iPad. "Mutual Core" app features a video game in which the player arranges geological layers in the same way as an accordion to play chords. During the verses, the player tries to unite the hemispheres, because the energy keeps them apart while during the chorus the app shifts to a cutaway of a planet, and the player can touch the layers of the planet's interior to open it up and touch the core. The player may also change the resistance of the chords to increase the difficulty. The app was released on October 10, 2011, along with the rest of the apps from Biophilia. On January 17, 2012, Björk uploaded a video tutorial explaining the app on her official YouTube channel, commented also by Biophilia app designer Scott Snibbe. As Björk explains on the video:

This app is called 'Mutual Core' and it's about taking the tectonic plates and pushing them together with effort until you create a mutual core beneath them. In musicology-wise this is to teach you about chords, and you can use [..] the tectonic plates, the strata inside them, and it sorta operates like accordion so you can change the chords and push them together and [...] create a mutual core.

=== Credits ===
- Björk – creative director
- John Simon, Jr. – creative director, software engineer

Credits taken from "Mutual Core" app.

== Music video ==
=== Background and development ===
A music video for the song was commissioned by the director of Los Angeles' Museum of Contemporary Art (MOCA), Jeffrey Deitch. The video was first revealed to be in the making in the September 2012 issue of Dazed & Confused, in an interview with director Andrew Thomas Huang. Huang was revealed to be chosen as the director for the video by Björk herself, marking this the first of several future collaborations. Huang said about the making process:

"There's a lot of volcanic and earthy stuff in the video, we put Björk in quite a few uncomfortable set-ups when we were filming, but she was game for anything. She was a lot of fun and just very warm and trusting."

The director also hinted at a parallelism between the video and its short film Solipsist, which was released weeks before the shooting of "Mutual Core" video: "[The song] is a metaphor between earth's crust and two people converging, and the effort that it takes, that was also what Solipsist was about, so working together made sense". The video was shot in Reykjavík in over two days. The director wrote the initial treatment for the video after visiting museums in London. The video features a mix of CG pictures and real natural elements, gathered by the team from different location in Iceland. The floating rocks in the video are made from foam and covered in plaster, fossilised barnacles and various textiles, the rock's tongues and the sand are computer-animated; for this reason, the post-production lasted two months. Björk's face motion was tracked in CG for the video, in which it appears to be melt in the rocks. Her costumes were inspired by Thai and Indonesian costumes, while the substance which resembles magma that she appears to spit in the video was a computer-modified mixture of ketchup and cake batter.

A teaser trailer has been released on 5 November 2012. The teaser shows Björk stuck in a bed of quicksand, wearing a blue wig. The video was premiered at an exclusive screening at the MOCA Grand Avenue on November 12, 2012. It was digitally released on November 13, 2012 on MOCA YouTube's channel, MOCAtv, as part of a series of music videos called ART+MUSIC which features collaborations between artists and musicians. The channel also posted a behind-the-scenes video on the same day. The video features glimpses of filming and an interview with the director of the video, who explains the filming process.

=== Synopsis ===
A screenshot from the music video where Bjӧrk sings surrounded by rocks under a rain of ashes.

In the beginning of the video, soil crumbles down, as Björk appears, buried to her waist in the sand, wearing a golden dress (by Michael van der Ham), a brooch on her shoulder designed by the singer herself and a blue wig, holding a rock. As she starts singing, she divides the rock into two pieces. As she waves the pieces, the sand around her stirs. She then lays the two pieces on the sand, and they become part of two rock sprites, that come out of the sand and start writhing around Björk, while strata emerges from them. In the end of the first verse, the strata of the two rocky sprites try to unite, as Björk grabs the sand and let it slips out from her fingers. During the second verse other rocks emerge from the sand and revolve around Björk, who dances in the sand. Other rocky sprites spring out of the new rocks and link to the main two, which are still spinning around the singer's head. The two parts are irresistibly attracted to each other and try to unite as they are stroked by Björk. The strata of the rocks morph to form a face, similar to that of the singer. As the chorus begins, Björk disappears in the darkness. The two rocky parts, now united, start to bestir themselves, whilst various rocks on the sand start to erupt. Lava, magma, smoke and fire storm while Björk's face appears in the lava. Every rock erupts noisily, causing a rain of volcanic ash.

The video shifts again to Björk buried in the sand under the rain of ashes. The two pieces of rock appear again, this time each one with a Björk-shaped strata. The strata also sing parts of the song, and two arms come out from the floating rocks and their hands barely brush against each other. The rocks unite once again as the chorus begins for the second time. During this part of the video, images of Björk singing in a smoky setting alternate with more rocks uniting to the main two, while their Björk-shaped strata secrete a substance similar to lava from their mouth. All the rocks are now united, forming a big volcano, whose crater is shaped like two opposite Björk-shaped rocks. The volcano finally erupts in an explosion of magma, while a thunderstorm occurs in the background. The video ends as the volcano fades out and all that remains visible is ash and smoke.

=== Reception and accolades ===
The video was heavily praised by critics. Bob Boilen of What Matters commented that the video is "a bit weird and smartly done". Tom Breihan of Stereogum stated that the video is "a beguilingly strange vision" and that "as the song unfolds, the images reach an explosive conclusion that resembles a fucked-up metal album cover", on a similar note, Gregory Adams of Exclaim! cited the video as "groundbreaking". A poster on The Huffington Post wrote that the video, which he billed as "hypnotic", "takes viewers on a strange spirit quest gone awry". Jonah Bayer of Myspace opined that "Björk is a true artist, and her new video for "Mutual Core" is ample evidence of that". Likewise, Sam Byford of The Verge stated that "Björk has a history of stunning music videos, but she may have outdone herself with this latest effort", while Gary Pini of Paper billed the singer as a "master of both art and music".

Judy Berman from Flavorwire found the video "a precise yet still poetic evocation of the track", while CraveOnline's Johnny Firecloud opined that "In her new video for "Mutual Core", Iceland's queen of bizarre takes her latest single from Biophilia and turns it into an intimate hallucinatory mingling of the elements". Chris Martins of Spin compared the video to the TV series Nova, stating that the video "might be the weirdest NOVA pilot ever created", later adding that Björk "reinvents herself as the freakiest geology teacher the world's ever seen", an expression used also by io9 blogger George Dvorsky, who commented that "this stunning new video for "Mutual Core" makes us wish we had Björk for a geology teacher". Brett Warner of Ology praised the director's work stating that "director Andrew Thomas Huang's gorgeous visuals will adeptly manage to both confuse the hell out of you and absolutely take your breath away". Abdullah Saeed of The Atlantic compared the video to her previous works and commented:

Back when she first began experimenting with electronic producer Mark Bell on Homogenic, Cunningham style complemented her music perfectly for videos like "All is Full of Love" Now, a decade and a half later, her music explores biology, a discipline naturally interpreted by Huang's visual sense. ["Mutual Core"] represents a new level of quality and ingenuity from Huang, who seems to be building on his now established visual style.

On 24 December 2012, the video received two nominations at the 2012 Antville Music Video Awards in the categories of Best Art Direction and Best Visual Effects. It went on to win the latter. The video was nominated for the Music Video of the Year category at the 19th Icelandic Music Awards, but lost to "Glow" by Retro Stefson. On 9 April 2013, the video was nominated at the 2013 Webby Awards in the Online Music & Video — Music category. The video won the People's Voice Webby in that category, as voted by the people on the internet, but lose the Webby bestowed by the International Academy of Digital Arts and Sciences to "Fjögur píanó" by Sigur Rós. The video received two nominations at the 2013 UK Music Video Awards for Best Visual Effects in a Video and Best Art Direction in a Video, winning none. However, Huang was nominated for his work in the video as Best New Director and went on to win the award.

=== Global projections ===
In March 2013, an edited version of the video was shown every night as part of a synchronised program on over 15 of the largest digital signs in Times Square, three minutes before midnight, as part of the Midnight Moment, a presentation of the Times Square Advertising Coalition (TSAC) and Times Square Arts. This Midnight Moment presentation is part of the New York City launch of Streaming Museum's Nordic Outbreak, an internationally touring exhibition of leading contemporary Nordic artists. Following the one-month exhibition in Times Square, a series of public programs and exhibitions took place across the city through 6 April at Scandinavia House, One Dag Hammarskjold Plaza, Manhattan Bridge Archway, Big Screen Plaza, Tisch School of the Arts, and an event in the Sky Room at the New Museum. On July 1, 2013, it was announced that the projections would go global, with planned projections to take place throughout the 7 continents, including a screening in the only cinema of Antarctica. Also on tour is a film by David Bates, Jr. that show the projection of the video across the billboards in Times Square. Commenting on the choice of bringing Björk's video projection worldwide, Nina Colosi, founder and creative director of Streaming Museum, stated:

In the music video Mutual Core directed by Andrew Thomas Huang, Björk is organically part of nature and universe. The human connection to nature is a theme that underpins most of her artistic output. It's particularly meaningful to bring Björk's vision to 7 continents because of its relevance to all cultures.

=== Credits ===
- Björk – starring role
- Andrew Thomas Huang – director
- Árni Björn Helgason – producer (Reykjavík unit)
- August Jakobsson – director of photography (Reykjavík unit)
- Gus Olafsson – production designer (Reykjavík unit)
- Frida Maria Hardardottir – hair & makeup artist (Reykjavík unit)
- Laura Merians – director of photography (Los Angeles unit)
- Hugh Zeigler – production designer (Los Angeles unit)
- David Lyons – visual effects executive producer
- Michael Ranger – lead CG supervisor
- Lindsey Fry – lead compositor
- Nico Sugleris – FX technical director
- LARK Creative – director representative

Credits taken from the official music video on YouTube.

== Live performances ==
Björk premiered Biophilia's songs during the Manchester International Festival with a residency commissioned by the Festival itself. The singer played in a circular stage which included custom-made instruments like computer-controlled Pendulum Harps and a Tesla Coil, an instrument called Gameleste, an hybrid between a gamelan and a celesta, and a pin Barrel organ called Sharpsichord. The stage also included a circle of projection screens. During the "Mutual Core" performance, the screen projected images of moving tectonic plates, which Alan Pedder of the website Wearsthetrousers likened to "Jóga"'s music video, while the choir performed a sort of choreography, which included huddling at center stage during the verses and dancing during the chorus. The song was performed on every date of her Biophilia tour. Her performance was well received by critics, which praised the whole show and project, which was called "ambitious". While reviewing Björk's show at the New York Hall of Science, Will Hermes of the website PembrokeMayball stated that "during 'Mutual Core', she sang of tectonic plates under a circle of projection screens illustrating the phenomena, and licked her lips after a line about how 'the Atlantic ridge drifts' like she could feel that motion tingle beneath her skin".

"Mutual Core" was added to the Vulnicura tour set lists beginning with Björk's headlining appearance at the Governors Ball Music Festival in New York on 6 June 2015, adding strings to the organ and choir parts of the original arrangement. The song also found its way onto Vulnicura Live, a collection of Björk's favorite performances from her 2015 tour.

== Credits and personnel ==
- Björk – vocals, songwriter, organ arrangement, beat, programming, choir arrangement, mixing, producer
- 16bit – beat, programming
- Matthew Herbert – beat, programming
- Damian Taylor – engineer, mixing
- Sveinn Kjartansson – engineer

Credits adapted from Biophilia album liner notes.

== Official versions ==
Digital download

- "Mutual Core" – 5:06

Biophilia Remix Series VI

- "Mutual Core" (Matthew Herbert's Teutonic Plates Mix) – 5:10

Biophilia Remix Series VII

- "Mutual Core" (16bit Remix) – 5:22

Biophilia Remix Series VIII

- "Mutual Core" (These New Puritans Remix featuring Solomon Islands Song) – 3:55

Beatport competition winner

- "Mutual Core" (Waxx Crooks Remix) – 4:27
