= 16-bit (disambiguation) =

16-bit computing is computing with 16-bit addresses or units of data.

16-bit or variants may also refer to:

- 16-bit era of video game consoles
- 16bit (band), a British electronic music and production duo
- Snap!, a German Eurodance group that were originally named 16 Bit
