= The Comet Song =

Single by Björk

from the album Moomins and the Comet Chase soundtrack and Biophilia (Deluxe Edition)
- Released: 6 September 2010
- Genre: Avant-garde
- Length: 2:13
- Label: One Little Indian
- Songwriters: Björk; Sjón
- Producers: Björk; Mark Bell; Matthew Herbert

Björk singles chronology
"Náttúra" (2008)	"The Comet Song" (2010)	"Crystalline" (2011)

"The Comet Song" is a song by Icelandic artist Björk, written by herself and long-time friend and collaborator Sjón as the title theme of the 2010 movie Moomins and the Comet Chase. The song is released as a charity single and all the benefits are donated to the victims of the 2010 Pakistan floods.

Björk had previously declared to be a big fan of the Moomins, and had worn clothes featuring the characters on several occasions.

== Background and composition ==
News first broke of a Björk and Moomins collaboration on 16 November 2009. Sjón, Icelandic poet and frequent Björk collaborator, was confirmed to have co-written the song with her.

On a 4 August 2010 appearance on BBC Radio 4 with Kristy Lang, Björk discussed her love of the Moomins, who were celebrating their 65th anniversary that year. "I read the books as a child, and then I read them for my children. I realized I like them just as much and they probably stand for something Nordic... I think there's something quite stark up there, there's a certain kind of simplicity. You could sort of speculate and say it's because there are fewer plants there and fewer animals and few buildings, so you kind of have fewer things. It's kind of more minimal. I've sometimes compared it to, like, Scandinavian furniture to Italian or something where Italian has hundreds of little details and curls and curves and decoration and I guess Scandinavian furniture isn't very decorated and kind of naked. So it's sort of, like, stark. It's funny and sad at the same time... I also just think the relationship to nature with me (that) Tove Jansson has. That's very important to me... What I also like is it's sort of more about the characters than their belongings, so it's sort of about timeless stuff... Everybody's allowed to be as eccentric as they are. And I think maybe when I was reading this for my kids when I'm grown up, I actually noticed some sort of anti-authority aspect in it... and there's no hierarchy between the characters. They're all equal. I like that a lot."

She also praised the Moomins creator Jansson, and revealed that at the night of the movie premiere in Finland she was invited to the island 2 hours by sea from Helsinki, where Tove Jansson had lived. "It was basically like a rock with one house in it, and that's it. No trees... So she would come there in April and go back in October every year... Sometimes there would be ice in the water when they were arriving. Quite often they couldn't land the boat, so she would just take her clothes off and say, 'Oh, don't worry. Just bring the food tomorrow,' and she'd just jump in and swim the last bit." In talking about the sparseness of Jansson's house with its one room and single desk and basement sauna, Björk admitted, "I could just relate to the purity in it." Interspersed throughout the broadcast, clips of "The Comet Song" played.

In an interview published on 3 August 2010 for Helsingin Sanomat, Björk revealed some details about the writing process: "At the time I was toying around with flutes quite a bit, and I mixed them with electronic sounds. The atmosphere seemed to be appropriate for the Moomins, where there has always been something bleak and dark, almost mystical. I wasn't thinking in terms of nationalities, but it got a northern tone." In addition to Sjón's involvement, Matthew Herbert and Mark Bell, both longtime collaborators of Björk's, co-produced the track with her.

When the single was released on iTunes, it was announced that proceeds from the track would go to support UNICEF's efforts to aid children in Pakistan.

== Release ==
"The Comet Song" was released as a digital download on 6 September 2010, making it Björk's first single not to have a commercially available physical release, although a promotional CD was sent to radio stations by her label, One Little Indian.

A year later, "The Comet Song" was included as a bonus track exclusive to the Japanese edition of Björk's 2011 album, Biophilia, featuring a new master made by Mandy Parnell.

== Critical reception ==
The Guardian summarised the collaboration of Björk and the Moomins as “the most perfect marriage of aural and visual sensibilities since Celine Dion stood wailing on the end of that big boat" and praised the song: "The chorus – if you can call it that – is brilliantly blunt: 'Comet, oh dammit.' Musically, it's all clanking percussion, creepy crawly basslines and that crystalline voice adding gravitas to lyrics such as 'we need milk and cakes and a warm bed'." Spin called it "typically avant-garde".

== Music video ==
Moomins in the music video for "The Comet Song".

The music video is made up of excerpts from the movie, itself compiled from the TV series The Moomins. The Moomins are seen working in a team and running away from a comet, among other things. The video was directed and edited by Maria Lindberg and Tommi Tikka and produced by Tom Carpelan through Filmkompaniet.
