= Drew Berry =

American biomedical animator

- Born: 1970 (age 55–56)
- Education: University of Melbourne
- Awards: MacArthur Foundation Fellowship
- Scientific career
- Fields: biomedical animator
- Workplaces: Walter and Eliza Hall Institute of Medical Research

Drew Berry (born 1970) is an Australian biomedical animator at the Walter and Eliza Hall Institute of Medical Research in Melbourne, Australia. He produces animations of proteins and protein complexes to illustrate cellular and molecular processes.

== Education ==
Berry received a Bachelor of Science (1993) and Master of Science (1995) degrees from the University of Melbourne, and received training in cell biology as well as in light microscopy and electron microscopy.

== Career ==
Since 1995, Berry has been a biomedical animator at the Walter and Eliza Hall Institute of Medical Research. His 3D and 4D animations have focussed on explaining cellular and molecular processes relevant to research conducted at the institute, in fields including molecular biology, malaria, cell death, cancer biology, hematology and immunology.

Berry's animations have received many awards and commendations. His animations which formed part of Harold Varmus' 'Genes and Jazz' presentation were described by The New Yorker as "astonishingly beautiful". In 2009 American Scientist stated "The admirers of Drew Berry... talk about him the way Cellini talked about Michelangelo." In 2010, the New York Times claimed "If there is a Steven Spielberg of molecular animation, it is probably Drew Berry"

After collaborating with Berry for the Biophilia animated music app, the musician Björk described Berry as "someone who has made scientifically correct animation of DNA… on this project, he has crossed the line beautifully into the artistic realm where he has animated gorgeous DNA but added some poetic licence... he truly has brought magic to our insides, and shows us that we don’t have to look far for the miracle of nature, it is right inside us!"

== Awards and recognition ==
- 2004 BAFTA award for DNA Interactive DVD, UK 2004
- 2005 Emmy Award for DNA documentary series
- 2005 Maya Master Award
- 2006 National Science Foundation Science and Engineering Visualization Challenge first place, noninteractive multimedia
- 2008 Nature Niche Prize
- 2009 Seed Magazine 'Revolutionary Minds'
- 2010 MacArthur Fellowship
- 2016 Honorary Doctor of Technology, Linköping University Sweden

== Highlight exhibitions and productions ==
- 2003 SIGGRAPH Electronic Theater
- 2003 "DNA" project Channel 4, PBS and American Museum of Natural History; Five episode "DNA" documentary series, "DNA: The Secret of Life" museum film, "DNAi" DVD, DNAi.org online education portal
- 2003 "oZone" Cinema of Tomorrow Experimental Digital Media Art Festival, Pompidou Centre Paris, France
- 2003 International Genetics Congress 2003 opening ceremony performance, Melbourne, Australia
- 2003 Australian Centre for the Moving Image Federation Square ‘Transfigure’ exhibition, Australia
- 2004 Museum of Modern Art (New York) ‘Premieres’ exhibition
- 2004 Queensland Art Gallery "The Nature Machine" exhibition, Brisbane, Australia
- 2004 National Academy of Sciences Koshland Science Museum, USA
- 2005 Visual effects for Doctor Who episode "The End of the World"
- 2006 Rose Center for Earth and Space, American Museum of Natural History, New York
- 2006 Shanghai Zendai Museum of Modern Art ‘Strange Attractors’ exhibition, China
- 2006 Forum Kultur und Wirtschaft Düsseldorf, Museum of Design, exhibition on nanotechnology, Germany
- 2008 20th Century Fox ‘The Day The Earth Stood Still’ visual effects, USA
- 2008 Niche Prize exhibition, The Royal Institute of Great Britain, UK
- 2008-09 ‘Genes and Jazz’ at the Guggenheim with Harold Varmus
- 2009 ‘The Cell’ BBC documentary series with Dr Adam Rutherford, UK
- 2009 ‘200th birthday of Charles Darwin’ exhibition, Museum of Natural History Stuttgart Germany
- 2009 ‘Genome Dome’ exhibition, University of Geneva, Switzerland
- 2010 Imagine Science Film Festival, New York
- 2011 TEDxCaltech
- 2011 TEDxSydney
- 2011 Björk's Biophilia album Hollow music video and DNA Replication drum machine iPad app
- 2011 Rochester Institute of Technology "Visionaries in Motion" speaker series
- 2011 Cold Spring Harbor Laboratory's DNAi.org Spliceosome visualization
- 2012 Animations for E.O.Wilson's Life on Earth digital textbook
- 2014 'Virus one billion times' architectural projection show, White Night Melbourne, Australia
- 2015 'Mendel: the Legacy' Brno Abbey architectural mapping live concert, Czech Republic
- 2015 'The Illuminarium' WEHI architectural art installation, Melbourne Australia
- 2016 'The Malaria Lifecycle' wehi.tv, Australia
- 2016 'Biomedical Breakthroughs' Melbourne Museum WEHI exhibition, Australia
- 2018 'The Future Starts Here' V&A South Kensington
- 2018-22 'Respiration' cell biology animations by wehi.tv for HHMI BioInteractive
- 2022 'Virus one million times' Science Gallery exhibition, Melbourne Australia
- 2023 'Chemistry of Life' 8K 3D fulldome film, Norrköping Visualisation Centre, Sweden
