= Biophilia (album) =

Studio album by Björk
- Released: 5 October 2011
- Recorded: 2008–2011
- Genres: Electronic; experimental
- Length: 49:26
- Label: One Little Indian
- Producers: Björk; 16bit

Björk chronology
| Mount Wittenberg Orca (2010) | Biophilia (2011) | Bastards (2012) |

Singles from Biophilia
- 1. "Crystalline" Released: 28 June 2011; 2. "Cosmogony" Released: 19 July 2011; 3. "Virus" Released: 8 August 2011; 4. "Moon" Released: 6 September 2011

Biophilia is the seventh (Note: Biophilia is officially considered to be her seventh album. However, technically this is the eighth solo album if to bear in mind her 1977 juvenilia release, or ninth, counting in her 1990 jazz output Gling-Gló.) studio album by Icelandic singer Björk. It was released on 5 October 2011 by One Little Indian Records and distributed by Nonesuch Records in North America and by Universal Music Group in the rest of the world. Björk composed it as a concept album during the 2008–2011 Icelandic financial crisis, exploring the links between nature, music and technology. Billed as the first "app album", Biophilia is a multimedia project released alongside a series of apps linking the album's themes to musicology concepts. It was followed by a series of educational workshops on four continents.

Four singles were issued before the album's release in 2011. "Crystalline", co-produced with English dubstep duo 16bit, was released as the lead single on 28 June 2011, accompanied by a music video directed by longtime collaborator Michel Gondry. It was followed by the singles "Cosmogony", "Virus" and "Moon". Björk promoted the album with the Biophilia tour, which began at the Manchester International Festival in June 2011 and ended in September 2013. Another track related to the project, "Náttúra", was released as a single in 2008.

Biophilia received critical acclaim and was named one of the best albums of 2011 by several publications; it was nominated for two awards at the 55th Grammy Awards in 2013, winning Best Recording Package. It debuted in the top 40 of every chart it entered worldwide, topping the Taiwan chart and peaking in the top 5 in Iceland, France and Denmark. In 2014, Biophilia became the first app included in the permanent collection of the Museum of Modern Art in New York.

Biophilia was followed by two remix series in 2011 and 2012, collected in the remix album Bastards, and music videos for the songs "Moon", "Crystalline", "Hollow" and "Mutual Core". The recording of the album was documented in the 2013 film When Björk Met Attenborough and a concert film from the tour, Biophilia Live, was released in 2014.

== Background ==
"I was off all my record deals, [...] so I felt I was off the grid, [...] so in that sense it was kind of crossroads project for me. On another level, at the end of the last project I lost my voice, [I] had a vocal nodule, [...] I didn't even know if I could sing again, so I had to redefine different techniques. And then, all these situation were happening in Iceland, the Bank crash, so I got really involved in environmental stuff [there]. So, on so many different levels, there was this message that all the old systems don't work anymore, you gotta clear your table and start from scratch."

— Björk on the background of Biophilia.

Biophilia grew from Björk's interest in nature and concerns about the environment. In June 2008, she performed a concert with the Icelandic band Sigur Rós to raise awareness about the use of Iceland's natural resources in aluminium melting plants. She founded the Náttúra organisation to promote Icelandic nature and grassroots industries, and released a single, "Náttúra", on 20 October 2008. A week later, Björk wrote an article for The Times discussing the proposed sale of natural resources to ease the Icelandic financial crisis. In collaboration with Audur Capital, she set up a venture capital fund to support sustainable industries in Iceland. On 30 June 2010, Björk and Dirty Projectors released a joint EP, Mount Wittenberg Orca, with proceeds going to marine protected areas.

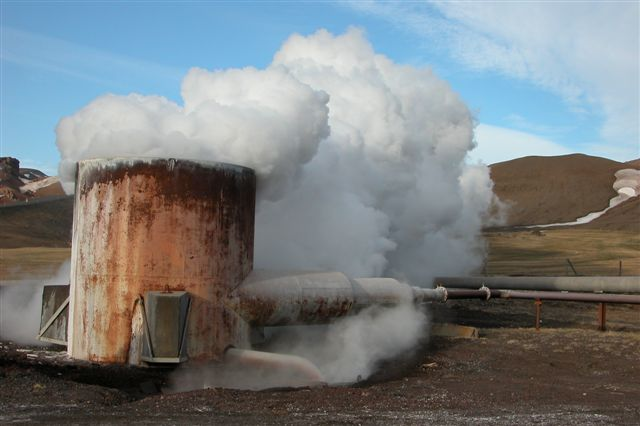
A Geothermal boiler in Reykjahlíð, Iceland. While composing Biophilia, Björk engaged herself in a series of political activities to preserve Iceland's natural resources.

In September 2010, the renewable power company Magma Energy acquired 98.5% of shares in the Icelandic geothermal power company HS Orka. On 21 May 2010, Björk wrote an open letter to the Reykjavík Grapevine calling on the Icelandic government to "do everything in its power to revoke the contracts with Magma Energy". After the deal was approved by the Icelandic Government, Björk launched a petition and promoted it with a performance at the Nordic House in Reykjavík on 19 July.

At the end of 2010, Björk confirmed she was working on a new album. In an interview published on Fréttablaðið she stated that the project was half-complete and that she hoped to tour before the end of 2011. On 6 January 2011 she started a three-day public karaoke marathon to protest the Magma Energy deal; the accompanying petition was signed by 47,000 people. The petition was welcomed by Iceland prime minister Jóhanna Sigurðardóttir.

The app Solar System, made by Touch Press, came out in January 2011, and featured a new instrumental track by Björk as an introduction. The demo track was confirmed to be a part of the upcoming Biophilia project. The details of the project were announced when the first Biophilia live show was announced for the Manchester International Festival in June 2011. Biophilia was stated to encompass music, apps, internet, installations and live shows.

== Composition ==
"Crystalline"
A 28-second audio sample of the album's lead single, "Crystalline".

Biophilia was partly composed on an Apple iPad.

"Crystalline", the first single released, is a mostly electronic song, featuring a continuous "gameleste" base and electronic beats and rhythm. After the bridge, the song features a gameleste solo, and ends with an uproarious breakcore section which uses the Amen break.

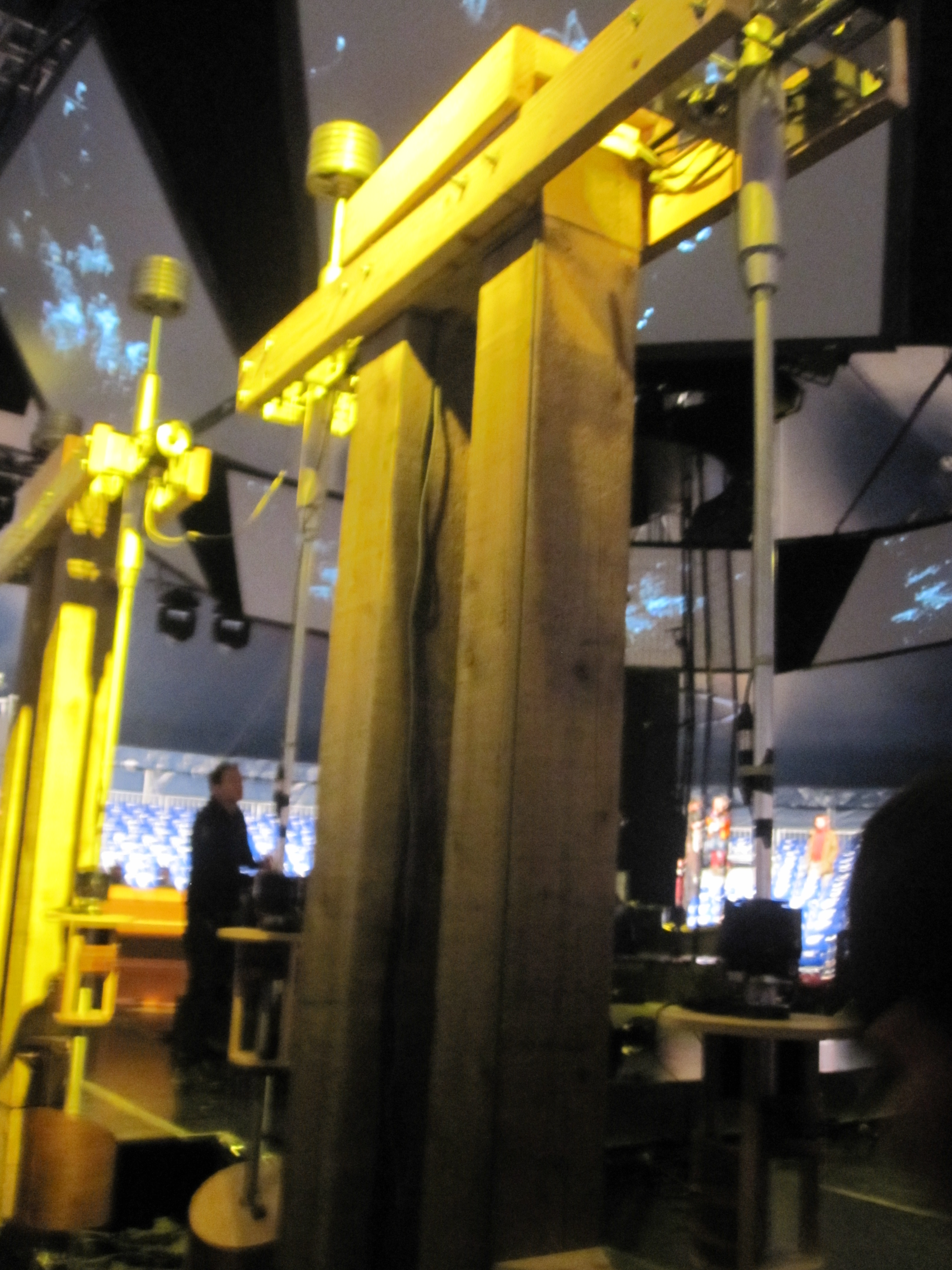
"Special" instruments were created for the album and its accompanying tour. The "gravity harps", which Björk conceived for the album, are mostly present throughout "Solstice".

New musical instruments were specially developed for the album, and specially for the shows at the Manchester International Festival that took place in mid-2011 to introduce the album. The Tesla coil was used as a musical instrument on the song "Thunderbolt". A "gameleste", a mixture between a gamelan and a celesta which was programmed in order to be played remotely by a tablet computer, was also used in "Crystalline" and "Virus". A group of pendulums were put together, creating patterns with their moves, transmitting the movements of the Earth to the sound of a harp, making the song "Solstice".

For the music, Björk related the phenomenon the song describes to a musical structure or resource. For example; the song "Moon" has different musical cycles that repeat throughout the song; the song "Thunderbolt" contains arpeggios, inspired by the time between when lightning is seen and thunder is heard; and in "Solstice", the counterpoint makes reference to the movement of planets and the Earth's rotation, and the pendulums used on the song make tribute to the Foucault pendulum.

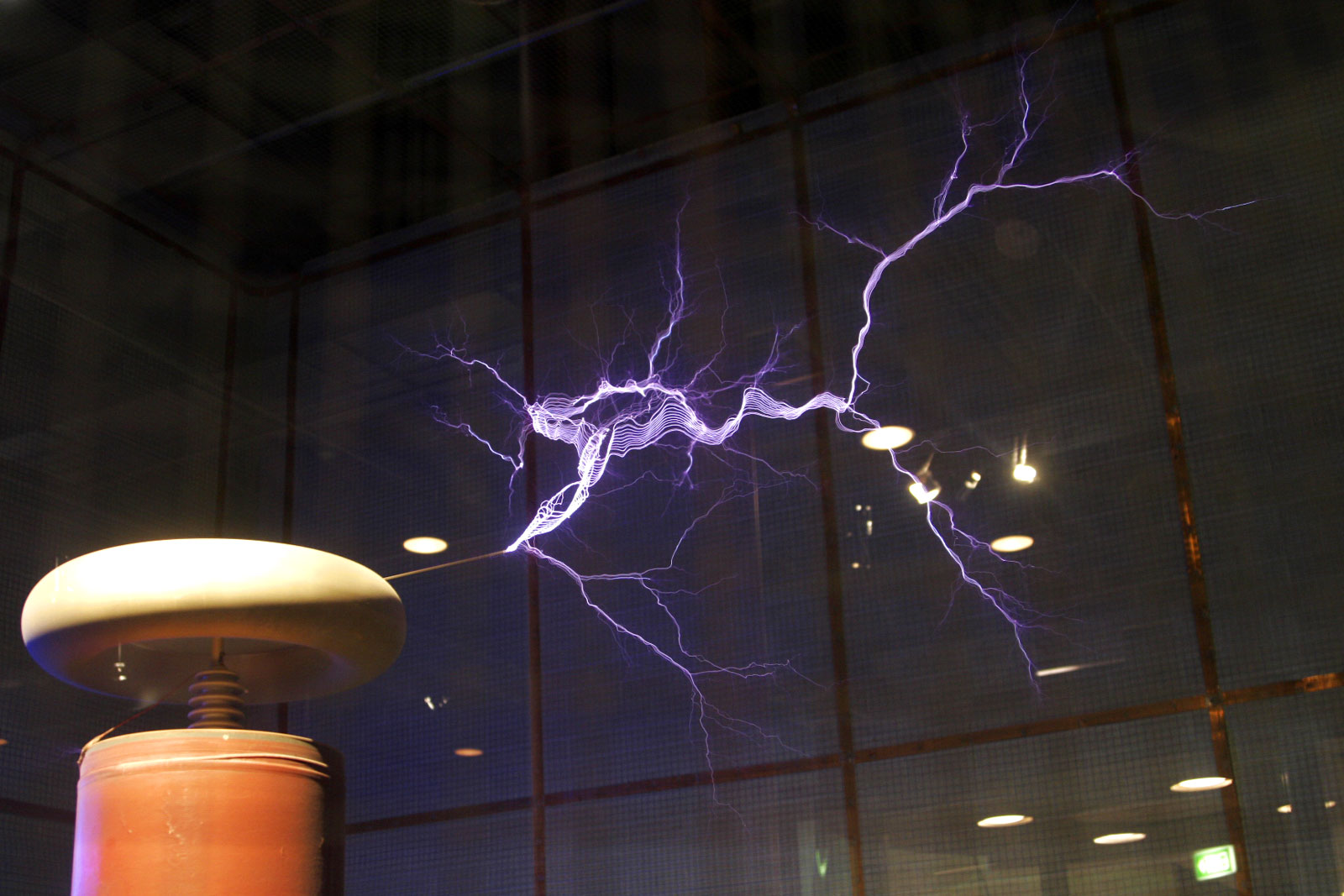
The Tesla coil is used as a musical instrument on the song "Thunderbolt".

The lyrics also present metaphors to those phenomena. "Dark Matter" features heavy gibberish since the dark matter phenomena are directly "unexplainable". "Virus" describes "fatal relationships" such as the relationship between a virus and a cell, as Björk explained: "It's like I have this new neighbour that I have to sort of learn to live with"; "Solstice" presents the relation between the gravity effect on celestial bodies, comparing the Solar System to a Christmas tree; and in "Hollow", Björk took inspiration from her "ancestors and DNA, that the grounds open below you and you can feel your mother and her mother, and her mother, and her mother, and her mother 30,000 years back. So suddenly you're this kinda tunnel, or trunk of DNA… All these ghosts come up so it ended up being a Halloween song and quite gothic in a way… It's like being part of this everlasting necklace when you're just a bead on a chain and you sort of want to belong and be a part of it and it's just like a miracle."

Björk also breaks the typical 4/4 time signature structure for many of the songs on Biophilia. For example, "Solstice" features 7/4 and 6/4 time signatures; "Hollow", "Crystalline" and "Moon", all feature a 17/8 time signature; "Mutual Core", 5/4 time signature and "Virus", 3/4 time signature. In addition, "Dark Matter" is in free-time, it lacks a regular pulse.

Biophilia is Björk's last album with frequent collaborator Mark Bell; Bell died from medical surgery complications in October 2014.

== Release and artwork ==
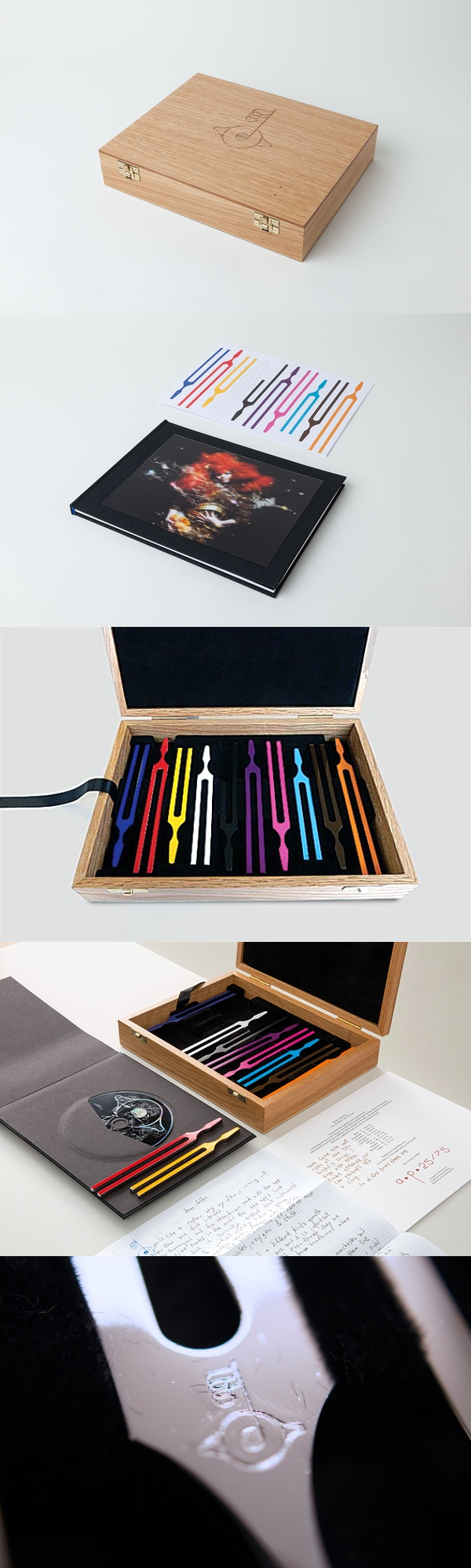
The Biophilia Ultimate Art Edition, published in an individually numbered edition of 200 copies and 75 artist's proofs (a.p.).

When the first details about Biophilia emerged, the album was expected to be released around the beginning of the residency at the Manchester International Festival in June. Eventually, the album was confirmed for a Fall 2011 release. The album was originally announced for a 27 September 2011 release in the United States.

Pre-order for the album started on 19 July 2011. Along with the standard edition album, which would be available in physical and digital formats, three additional editions were announced. The first, the deluxe edition, available in digipak format in its physical form, would contain three additional tracks. The second special edition, billed the Manual edition, was announced to include the standard edition of Biophilia and a bonus disc, both contained in a "48-page, full-color, hardbound, cloth-covered, and thread-sewn book, tipped on lenticular panel to the front cover, with foil-blocked spine and back cover". The last edition, called the Ultimate Art Edition, included the Manual Edition of Biophilia in a wooden box, which was filled with 10 chromed tuning forks, each one adjusted to the tone of a Biophilia track, covering a complete octave in a non-conventional scale. Differently from the standard and deluxe edition of the album, those two latter editions were available to pre-order until 12 August 2011. Moreover, the Ultimate Art edition was limited to only 200 copies and 75 artist's proofs (a.p.), each one numbered and made to order. She was criticized for the cost of this latter edition, which was £500. Björk unveiled the track listing for Biophilia on 19 August 2011. It was later confirmed that the second disc included in the Manual edition would include a live recording of the Biophilia show in Manchester.

On 10 May 2011, Björk relaunched her official website. Using a HTML5 constellation designed by M/M Paris, the website shifts around as the visitor moves the cursor. In June 2011, she started posting photos of different minerals and crystals on her Facebook official page. One of those images, which was accompanied by the comment "...introducing" was used as a placeholder cover art for the pre-order of the album and mistaken for the official album cover. Eventually, Björk unveiled the cover for the album on 17 August 2011. The cover artwork, designed by longtime collaborators M/M Paris and shot by Inez van Lamsweerde and Vinoodh Matadin, features Björk, wearing an Iris van Herpen haute couture brown and golden dress, taken from the designer's Synesthesia 2010 collection, along with a "harp-belt" made by Threeasfour, and a red wig, resembling a nebula, created by British hairstylist Eugene Souleiman, holding an orange crystal while being surrounded by the Biophilia constellation which appears in the app. According to Björk, she was inspired by the protagonist of British-Mexican surrealist novelist Leonora Carrington's book The Hearing Trumpet to create the persona of a "frustrated music teacher" which always has her "head in the clouds" to explain her concepts to people around her, an attitude she thought she had while explaining her idea for Biophilia to her collaborators, and that's why she decided to wear wigs throughout the whole Biophilia era and promotion.

The "musical compass" symbol designed by M/M Paris, which features on the cover of every Biophilia-related releases and in the app.

On 1 September 2011, she announced a postponement of the album's release date, pushing it back two weeks after the former date. This was because of Björk's dissatisfaction with the final mastering of the album. Björk explained in a statement published on her Facebook page that she felt the album version needed more depth than the version featured on the app. She called long-time collaborator Leila Arab to work on the tracks, and in turn Arab recommended her mastering engineer Mandy Parnell and drum & bass artist Current Value. Parnell flew to Reykjavík to work on the record in Addi 800's mastering studio, where she spent different hours with Björk discussing the changes to make on the album. At the end, Parnell remastered all of Biophilia songs, while Arab added beats and sonic sculpting to "Crystalline", "Thunderbolt", "Dark Matter" and "Virus". Current Value added beats to "Sacrifice", which was originally played completely acoustic during the Manchester residency. Björk also decided to use a live recording of "Solstice" instead of the studio version. Three weeks before the supposed release, the album was leaked on the internet. Björk called the leak "frustrating but predictable". NPR officially offered a streaming of the album on 5 October 2011, the same day in which it was first officially released in Japan. Biophilia was worldwide released in the following days, most notably on 10 October in the United Kingdom and on 11 October in the United States.

== App ==
Biophilia
- App opening screen
- Developers: Second Wind Apps, RelativeWave
- Publishers: One Little Indian; Well Hart
- Producer: Scott Snibbe Studios
- Designer: M/M Paris
- Artist: Björk
- Platforms: iOS; Android
- Release: iOS; 19 July 2011; Android; 17 July 2013
- Genre: Music

The Biophilia app consists of a series of 10 separate apps, one for each song, all included in a "mother app" which contains a menu made up by a three-dimensional constellation which the user can shift, zoom and orbit by swiping their fingers to open the apps. The first time the app is opened, an introduction by David Attenborough describes the application and the project itself. This introduction was also used to open the Biophilia tour residency concerts. On the up left corner, the "musical compass" icon serves as a home button to return to the menu. If the icon is touched when the user is already facing the menu, a list of the application, including two pages for "how to navigate" and "credits", would appear. Every app is named after the corresponding song and includes different options, along with a description of the song and application. This short description link to an essay written for each song by Nikki Debben. The first option in the apps is to play the app, the second is the score, in which the user can look at the composition of the song, use it as a karaoke machine as the score has no vocals in it, or turn off the music and use it as sheet music. The animation option links to an animation of the song created by Stephen Malinowski, in which different forms of different colors, linked to a specific instrument in the song, including Björk's voice, zoom in or out depending on their intensity. The fourth option shows the lyrics of the song, which are not available in the "Dark Matter" app as it is sung in gibberish and thus has no lyrics at all. The last option is to scroll the credits, which name the people who have worked in the app. The "mother app", "Cosmogony", is the constellation that includes all the other applications, and thus contains no particular game or instrument to play. Nevertheless, it contains two other options, which are the possibility to replay the intro narrated by Attenborough and to play the song in its entirety. When the user plays the song, whether they would click on the compass icon they would return to the main menu immediately. Tapping in an empty space of the constellation would also make the user return to the main screen. The apps are roughly divided into two kinds: the ones in which the user play a sort of games, and the other ones that work like a musical instrument.

Almost every song on the app is presented in early, work-in-progress versions. For example, tracks like "Thunderbolt", "Sacrifice" and "Hollow" are missing their percussion parts and beats as they were added to the songs shortly before the album's physical release when Björk decided these early versions were unsatisfactory for a traditional music album. While "Sacrifice" is missing beats and is performed at a slightly lower speed, the most interesting early version of a Biophilia track is "Solstice"; the album version was recorded live during her Manchester residency but the app originally contained a demo version performed in studio. In addition to these work-in-progress versions, several of the games feature the songs with sections of music missing, to be played and manipulated by the player ("Thunderbolt" for example has the player drag their fingers across the screen to play the Tesla coil baseline).

=== Gameplay ===
The application called "Moon" works as a music sequencer, using a string of little pearls linked to a central spine topped by a moon, the user can decide whether to play the original version of the song or to modify it by rotating the pearls to adjust the notes. Rotating the moon would instead modify the number of notes that are played in the sequence. The user can then decide to save the composition, to load one already saved beforehand, to reset the song or to play the original version. Similarly to the "Moon" app, the "Solstice" application works as an instrument, in which the user can pull strings out of a central sun, create orbits around the sun and rotating planets by touching the screen and using the planets to pluck the strings like it was a harp. The user can also change the direction and speed of the planets and create multiple layers of orbits. The instrument can also be played in "tree" mode, where the system would stretch to become a tree. The "Sacrifice" app features a keyboard that allows the user to type letters linked to different snippets of the song. Both these two latter applications allow players to save or load their composition. In the "Thunderbolt" app, the user can create electric sparks by tapping their fingers on a black screen, or create an arpeggio, depicted by an electrical line, by using two or more fingers at the same time, to compose arpeggios while Björk sings the song or independently. The player can also adjust the fade time and the drawing length of the lightnings.

The other apps work like more conventional video games. In the app for "Virus" the user shall protect a cell from the attack of various bacteria that try to infect it, as the song plays in the background. But if the player prevents the infection, the song plays in a loop, so the user must lose the game in order to make the song continue. The instrument mode in the "Virus" app let the player use the Cell nucleus and the bacteria as percussion by tapping and jolting them. In "Dark Matter", the actual song plays in part until it stops and the user must mimic the pattern of lighting of some orbs to continue in the song, while in the instrument mode the orbs let the user play different scales. The "Mutual Core" app features a video game in which the player arranges geological layers in the same way as an accordion to play chords. During the verses, the player tries to unite the hemispheres, because the energy keeps them apart while during the chorus the app shifts to a cutaway of a planet, and the player can touch the layers of the planet's interior to open it up and touch the core. The player may also change the resistance of the chords to increase the difficulty. "Crystalline" features a video game in which the player, in the form of a crystal, travels through different tunnels, depending on where the player tilts their device, with each tunnel corresponding to a part of the song. The player may decide to repeat the same part of the song endless times if he goes through the same tunnel. As the crystal travels through the pipes, the player can catch other crystals scattered around, resulting in the opening of new tunnels and paths, and in the end the resulting crystalline formation can be saved as a picture. The "Hollow" presents a video depiction of the body interior, starting from the blood tissue descending into showing the DNA and the replisome. The "Hollow" instrument let the user tap different enzymes depicted in the background to play time signatures and build a drum machine.

=== Release and availability ===
It was firstly released on 19 July 2011, when the "Cosmogony" and "Crystalline" apps were released. On the same day, Björk teased the release of the app by posting a video in which the introduction by Attenborough can be heard. The other app were added later, with "Virus" being added on 9 August, "Moon" on 6 September and the rest of the apps were released alongside the album on 10 October 2011. The application was originally made available only on Apple iOS devices. Björk refused to undertake a partnerships with Apple so the company only accorded her the availability of a page on the iTunes store that would show the app and the singles extracted from the album all on the same page and Apple did not fund the project. Scott Snibbe commented that he was not sure if the project would be ported into some other platforms. Björk stated she hoped pirates would crack Biophilia into other platforms. The app was effectively cracked into a virus by cyber criminals from eastern Europe, that tried to spread a malware into Android devices that would download the fake application. A holiday edition of the "Solstice" app, with different sound samples and colors, was released on 21 December 2011. The same special edition was offered for free during Christmas 2012. On 17 January 2012, Björk updated on her YouTube channel a series of videos in which she and Snibbe explain the contents of the different apps and offer a tutorial on how they work.

Björk expressed her will to transport Biophilia on other devices by using a crowdfunding initiative. On 28 January 2013, Björk started a crowdfunding on Kickstarter to port the Biophilia app on Android and Windows 8 platforms. She also released a video in which she explained the reason behind the funding and thanked for the help. The crowdfunding was canceled on 7 February 2013, after only £15,370 was collected out of the £375,000 goal. While this was early interpreted as a sign of failure of the initiative, Björk later explained that the team had found a cheaper and faster way to transport the apps on Android thanks to a company named Apportable. The apps were ultimately released on Android devices on 17 July 2013.

== Promotion ==
=== Appearances and interviews ===
Björk promoted Biophilia extensively by giving different interviews on music criticism websites. Most notably, she explained the concept behind the project during interviews with Stereogum, Drowned in Sound, Pitchfork and Rolling Stone. She was featured on the cover of the 200th issue of Dazed & Confused, for which she also served as a guest editor. The volume featured behind the scenes and interviews with Björk's collaborators in the project, including the choir Graduale Nobili, 16bit, Scott Snibbe and Stephen Malinowski. She was also featured on the cover of the Billboard magazine. Björk also gave various radio interviews with BBC Radio 1, BBC Radio 6 Music, XFM, The Strand, CBC Radio and Studio 360. She restrained from giving televised interviews but she filmed an interview for Associated Press which was published on YouTube.

On 22 November 2011, she appeared on BBC2's show Later... with Jools Holland to perform "Crystalline", "Cosmogony" and "Thunderbolt". These two latter performances were broadcast on 25 November. The three performances were later included in the reissue of Björk 2003 DVD Later with Jools Holland, that was released on 18 June 2012. On 31 January 2012, she performed "Cosmogony" on Comedy Central's late-night satirical program The Colbert Report, where she also answered some questions from the show's presenter Stephen Colbert. On 22 May 2012, Björk made an appearance at the New York Public Library, alongside Scott Snibbe and Curver, to announce the Biophilia educational workshops at the Library and at the Children's Museum of Manhattan, and to answer some questions. On 16 May 2013, it was announced that Björk would serve as one of the speakers at the Wired 2013 Conference, where she was interviewed by Jefferson Hack on 18 October 2013. Björk also attended the premiere of Biophilia Live at the 2014 Tribeca Film Festival on 26 April 2014, where she took part in a Q&A alongside the film directors Peter Strickland and Nick Fenton.

=== Singles and videos ===
Björk's head made of protein subunits as seen in the "Hollow" music video.

"Crystalline" was released as the lead single from the album. The single release was preceded by two video teasers; the first, entitled "Road to Crystalline", featured Björk driving on her van through a road in Iceland while playing an excerpt of an en early version of the song, and was released on 27 May 2011. The second one, released on 13 June 2011, showed the gameleste, the celesta-gamelan hybrid created for the Biophilia project. The single version of the song, namely the Serban Ghenea mix, leaked onto the Internet on 25 June 2011. The single was officially released on 28 June 2011. The music video, directed by French director Michel Gondry, was released on YouTube on 26 July 2011. After "Crystalline", three songs on were released on iTunes as singles beside the expansion app. The second single-app released was "Cosmogony" on 19 July. On the same day, the "mother app" and the application for "Crystalline" were released. The next singles were "Virus", released on 9 August, and finally "Moon", on 6 September, after being leaked on 22 August. Both accompanying apps were released on the same day. A music video for "Moon", directed by Björk alongside M/M Paris, Inez & Vinoodh and James Merry, recorded during the photo sessions for Biophilia, was released on 23 September.

Even though it wasn't released as a single, a live performance of "Thunderbolt" from the Manchester International Festival was released as a music video on YouTube on 2 November 2011. On 6 March 2012, a promotional music video was released for "Hollow", directed by biomedical animator Drew Berry. The video, previously used in the "Hollow" app, features a three-dimensional exploration of Björk's molecules and also a molecular complex based on Björk's headscan, influenced by the works of Italian painter Giuseppe Arcimboldo. A music video for "Mutual Core" was commissioned by the Museum of Contemporary Art in Los Angeles and was directed by Andrew Thomas Huang. The video was released on 13 November 2012 on the museum's YouTube channel.

=== Remix series ===
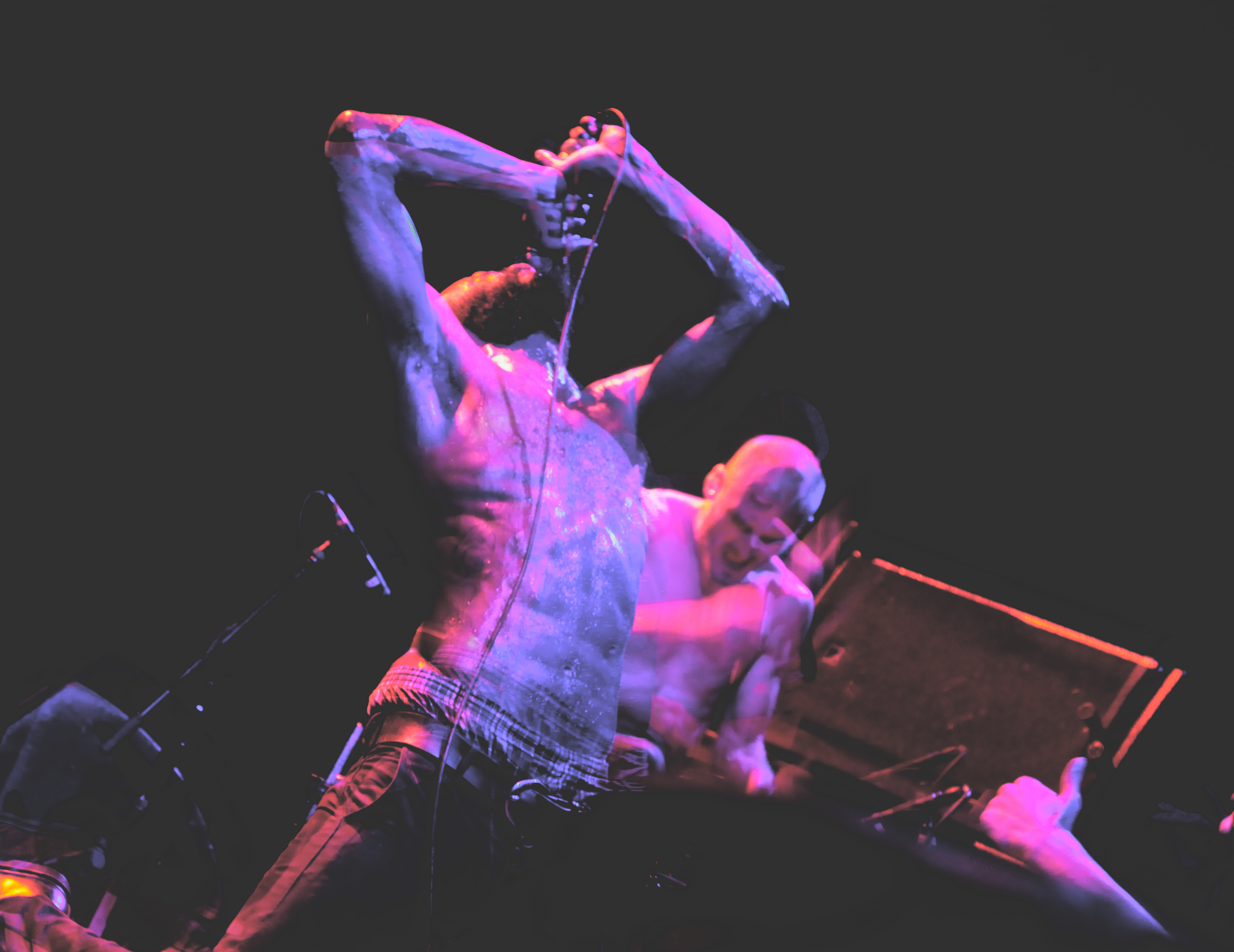
The experimental hip hop group Death Grips performing in New York City. They provided two remixes for the Biophilia Remix Series which were both later included on Bastards (2012).

Leading up to the album release, Björk issued a series of remixes of "Crystalline" and "Cosmogony", titled The Crystalline Series. The remixes were released on digital download, LP and in a limited CD edition. The first part, which contained the two single versions of the songs by Serban Ghenea, was released on 19 July 2011, coinciding with the digital release of "Cosmogony". The second part included two remixes of "Crystalline" and "Thunderbolt" by Syrian musician Omar Souleyman, alongside an original song by the musician, called "Mawal", was released on 26 July. This release was anticipated by a video teaser, which showed Souleyman during the recording sessions for the remix of "Crystalline". The third and fourth parts, containing remixes of the two tracks by British electronic musician and producer Matthew Herbert, were released on 2 August 2011.

On 6 March 2012, One Little Indian announced the upcoming release of another eight-part series of remixes. Billed as the Biophilia Remix Series, each part was announced to come out starting on 16 April 2012, each every two weeks after the other, on digital download, CD and LP. The deluxe edition of each release consisted in a limited edition package with micro textured blue minerals papers and embossed foil lettering, designed by M/M Paris. The first entry featured remixes of "Crystalline" and "Solstice" by Current Value. The second part, released on 30 April 2012, included remixes of "Thunderbolt" and "Sacrifice" by experimental hip hop band Death Grips. On the third part of the series, Hudson Mohawke remixed "Virus" and El Guincho reworked "Cosmogony"; this entry came out on 14 May 2012. The fourth part once again featured remixes by Current Value, who this time remixed "Thunderbolt" and "Hollow", and was released on 28 May 2012. The fifth entry was released on 11 June 2012, including a King Cannibal remix of "Thunderbolt" and a remodel of "Dark Matter" produced by Alva Noto. Matthew Herbert remixed "Virus", "Mutual Core" and "Sacrifice", and his remixes were included in the sixth entry, released on 25 June 2012, while the seventh part consisted of two remixes of "Mutual Core" and "Hollow" by 16bit. The eight and last part of the series was delayed for unspecified reasons. It was ultimately released on 13 November 2012, and included a remix of "Moon" by The Slips, and a remix of "Mutual Core" by These New Puritans.

On 8 October 2012, Björk announced Bastards, a collection of remixes of Biophilia tracks which were previously included in the two series. Every remix was remastered by Mandy Parnell. The compilation was released on 19 November 2012.

== Critical reception ==
Professional ratings
Aggregate scores
| Source | Rating |
|---|---|
| AnyDecentMusic? | 7.8/10 |
| Metacritic | 79/100 |
Review scores
| Source | Rating |
| AllMusic | 4/5 stars |
| The A.V. Club | C |
| The Daily Telegraph | 5/5 stars |
| Entertainment Weekly | A− |
| The Guardian | 4/5 stars |
| NME | 9/10 |
| Pitchfork | 6.2/10 |
| Q | 4/5 stars |
| Rolling Stone | 4/5 stars |
| Spin | 7/10 |

Biophilia received positive reviews from music critics. At Metacritic, which assigns a normalised rating out of 100 to reviews from mainstream critics, the album received an average score of 79, based on 37 reviews, which indicates "generally favorable reviews". Critical acclaim came from BBC Music's Mike Diver, who described the album as "mesmerizing" and "an amazing, inventive and wholly unique eighth album from an artist without peer", praising both her voice as a "controlled presence" and her composition work: "Björk has crafted sounds which are entirely hers alone". Möhammad Choudhery of Consequence of Sound praised the "asteroid-bass volley" of "Mutual Core" and "apocalyptical breakbeat coda" of "Crystalline" and stated that "they blend archaic instrumentation with blistering electronica" and even if he labelled Biophilia as "hardly easy listening", he found that "it'll stand as one of the more rewarding albums of her storied career". Biophilia was named "CD of the week" by The Daily Telegraph, whose writer Helen Brown described the album as "wilfully weird" yet "surprisingly accessible, hypnotic and beautiful if you give it time and concentration: the audio equivalent of looking through a microscope at crystals growing". According to NME's Luke Turner, "[looking] past the techno wizardry, the grand designs and the brainy philosophy", Biophilia is "intimate, playful and beautiful" and "a wonderful distillation of ideas, playful and serious, intimate yet the most fantastic journey. [...] A record so particular to Björk's own artistry that no-one could ever hope to replicate it." Now magazine's Kevin Ritchie praised the album as "one of Björk's best and most challenging records" and that "[i]ts accompanying iPad suite [...] isn't required to enjoy the album, which has a satisfyingly messy and unhinged quality, much like the natural wonders that inspired it". Similarly, Gareth James of Clash felt that the album "sounds beautifully warm and compellingly human", and stated that "while much of the fuss around the album has centred on its innovative and hugely interactive app release, this music really doesn't need any window dressing because it's as good a collection of songs as she has put her name to in ten years".

Kyle Andersen of Entertainment Weekly stated that Biophilia is "an ingenious marriage of faerie and machine. But [her] greatest strength remains the glistening natural resource flowing from her throat". For Heather Phares of AllMusic, "Biophilia is easily her most ambitious project as a whole", whose "boldest innovations are in its presentation rather than in the actual music" and "sometimes feels like a soundtrack", but further adds that "just because the music is only one part of the Biophilia experience doesn't mean it's unsatisfying". Phares eventually gave the album 4 out of 5 stars, also citing its "blend of education and emotion." Daniel Paton of musicOMH viewed Biophilia as a "synthesis of Björk's work thus far", yet "it sees her continue to pursue her own radical and individual path with unshakeable conviction." He also complimented her language, "English [...] always sounds so enticing and odd when delivered in her syntax." Rolling Stone's David Fricke compared the album to Nico's work, "[with its] organ, squishy electronics and the high sighs of a women's choir in stark fields of echo, [Biophilia is] like a haunted digital sister of Nico's 1969 album, The Marble Index". Alexis Petridis of The Guardian wrote that "Biophilia never feels like hard work, however much the accompanying bumf tries to convince you it is." Despite his skepticism over interactive music and apps, he stated the quality of the music is "far less questionable". PopMatters music editor Arnold Pan complimented Björk as being "innovative by nature and eager to take risks" and praised Biophilia's songs, despite claiming "there are some moments on Biophilia that are too atmospheric and subtle [...] especially the low profile 'Dark Matter' and the overly abstract 'Hollow', with its cold modern classical stylings". A more mixed review came from Pitchfork's Mark Pytlik, which felt that she "prioritized the superficial aspects of Biophilia's presentation over, well, the music", further adding that "she combats the lack of any real structure or melody by over-singing, or lapsing into one of her familiar and increasingly lazy-sounding house vocal runs." He also wrote that "[a]s an innovator, she's as vibrant as ever, but as a songwriter, she sounds tired". Andy Gill of The Independent gave the album a negative review, dubbing it as "hard to love" and added that "at times, it's hard not to conclude that the music and lyrics were devised totally separately, and then forced together in forms it's difficult to acknowledge as songs".

2011 Year-end list entries

| Publication | List | Rank | Ref. |
|---|---|---|---|
| Aftenposten | 25 Best Albums of 2011 | 9 | |
| BBC Music | Top 25 Albums of 2011 | 11 | |
| Beats Per Minute | Top 50 Albums of 2011 | 27 | |
| Clash | Top 40 Albums of 2011 | 12 | |
| Drowned in Sound | Favourite Albums of 2011 | 30 | |
| Fact | 50 Best Albums of 2011 | 44 | |
| Gaffa | Top Foreign Albums of 2011 | 6 | |
| Gigwise | Top 50 Albums of 2011 | 22 | |
| guardian.co.uk | The Best 50 Albums of 2011 | 17 | |
| Hot Press | Top 30 Albums of 2011 | 10 | |
| La Presse | Top 60 Pop-Rock Albums and Songs of 2011 | 8 | |
| Mojo | Top 50 Albums of 2011 | 32 | |
| musicOMH | Top 50 Albums of 2011 | 8 | |
| NME | 50 Best Albums of 2011 | 38 | |
| Q | Top 50 Albums of 2011 | 23 | |
| The Quietus | Albums Of The Year 2011 | 44 | |
| Rough Trade | Top 100 Albums of the Year | 59 | |
| State | Albums of 2011 | 23 | |
| Uncut | Top 50 Albums of 2011 | 27 | |

=== Accolades ===
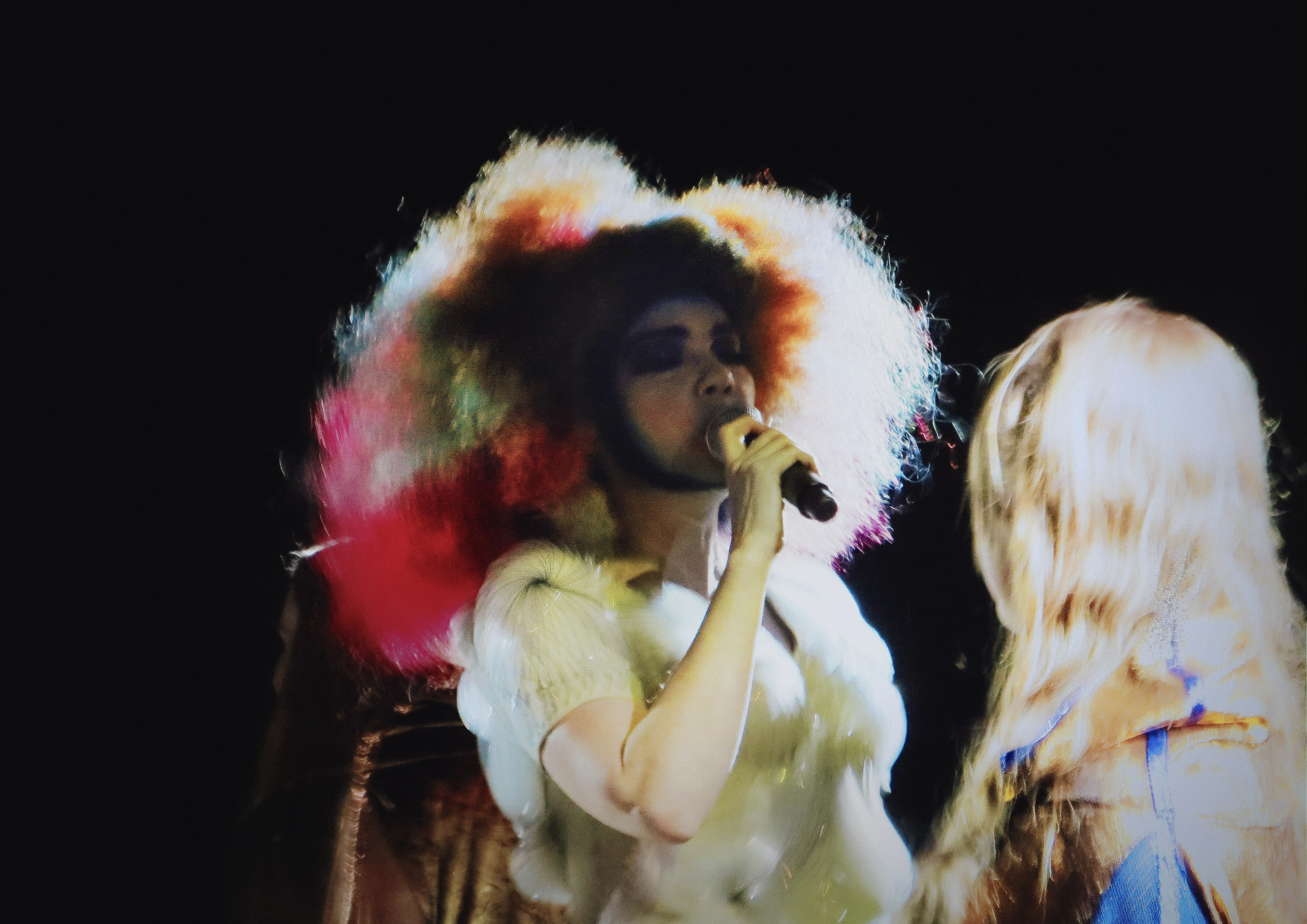
Björk performing during the Biophilia tour at the Cirque en Chantier in Paris, France, on 27 February 2013.

Björk and Biophilia received numerous nominations after the announcement of the project. She was nominated at the 2011 Q Awards for Greatest Act of the Last 25 Years, losing to U2. At the 2011 O Music Awards she was awarded the Digital Genius honour, while at the AIM Independent Music Awards she was honoured for her Outstanding Contribution to Music. She also received a Lifetime Achievement at the 2011 Lovie Awards. At the 2011 Antville Music Awards, the "Crystalline" music video was nominated for Best Art Direction. Apple picked the Biophilia app as one of the top 5 music apps of 2011.

M/M Paris were awarded a Tokyo Type Directors Club Award for their work on Biophilia artwork, manual and app. Biophilia was one of the twelve albums nominated for the 2011 Nordic Music Prize. At the 2012 BRIT Awards, Björk received a nomination for International Female Solo Artist. Björk received five nominations at the 2011 Icelandic Music Awards, being nominated for Pop, Rock, Jazz or Blues Performer of the Year and Pop, Rock, Jazz or Blues Female Singer of the Year, winning the former. Biophilia was nominated for Pop/Rock Album of the Year and "Crystalline" received a nomination in the Pop/Rock Song of the Year. The Biophilia tour live at Harpa won the Musical Event of the Year award. At the 2012 NME Awards Biophilia received a nomination in the Best Album Artwork category. Björk appeared at the 2012 Webby Awards to receive the Webby Artist of the Year from the hands of Scott Snibbe, where she stated "A E I O U" in fashion of the five words-limited speeches of the ceremony. "Crystalline" was nominated for Best Female Video at the 2012 MTV Video Music Awards Japan. The Biophilia tour show at the Cumbre Tajín festival was nominated for the Alternative Performance award at the 2012 Lunas del Auditorio. Björk received another two nominations at the 2012 Antville Music Awards, where the "Mutual Core" video was nominated for Best Art Direction and Best Visual Effects, winning the latter.

At the 2013 Music Producers Guild Awards, Björk received The MPG Innovation Award, which Emma Birkett accepted on her behalf. Biophilia received two nominations at the 2013 Grammy Awards, for Best Alternative Album and Best Recording Package, winning the latter. The award went to the art directors, M/M Paris, and not to Björk herself. The "Mutual Core" video was nominated in the Music Video of the Year category at the 2012 Icelandic Music Awards and was nominated at the 2013 Webby Awards in the Online Music & Video — Music category. The video won the People's Voice Webby in that category, as voted by the people on the internet, but lose the Webby bestowed by the International Academy of Digital Arts and Sciences to "Fjögur píanó" by the Sigur Rós. The video received two nominations at the 2013 UK Music Video Awards for Best Visual Effects in a Video and Best Art Direction in a Video, winning none. However, Andrew Thomas Huang was nominated for his work in the video as Best New Director and went on to win the award.

== Commercial performance ==
Biophilia debuted at number 27 on the US Billboard 200, with first-week sales of 15,000 copies. The album also opened at number one on the Dance/Electronic Albums chart, number two on the Tastemaker Albums chart, number five on the Alternative Albums chart, and number eight on the Rock Albums chart. It debuted at number 21 on the UK Albums Chart, becoming Björk's first album not to reach the top 10. In Japan, the album debuted at number 18 with first-week sales of 6,525 copies. The following week it plunged down to number 23, selling an additional 4,412 units. The limited edition of the album debuted at number 16 on the Gaon International Albums Chart in South Korea, while the standard edition debuted at number 22.

== Legacy ==
On 11 June 2014, the Museum of Modern Art in New York City announced that the Biophilia app became the first downloadable app in the museum permanent collection. The app inclusion was requested by Senior curator Paola Antonelli, that commented:

Björk has never ceased to experiment and surprise. The multidimensional nature of her art—in which sound and music are the spine, but never the confines, for multimedia performances that also encompass graphic and digital design, art, cinema, science, illustration, philosophy, fashion, and more—is a testament to her curiosity and desire to learn and team up with diverse experts and creators. It was just a matter of time before she would invade and conquer the territory of design. [...] With Biophilia however, Björk truly innovated the way people experience music by letting them participate in performing and making the music and visuals, rather than just listening passively.

== Track listing ==
All music is composed by Björk except where noted. All songs are produced by Björk except "Crystalline", produced by Björk and 16bit.

Biophilia
| No. | Title | Lyrics | Length |
|---|---|---|---|
| 1. | "Moon" (music: Björk, Damian Taylor) | Björk | 5:40 |
| 2. | "Thunderbolt" | Björk; Oddný Eir Ævarsdóttir | 5:15 |
| 3. | "Crystalline" | Björk | 5:08 |
| 4. | "Cosmogony" | Björk; Sjón | 5:00 |
| 5. | "Dark Matter" (music: Björk, Mark Bell) | wordless vocals | 3:22 |
| 6. | "Hollow" | Björk | 5:49 |
| 7. | "Virus" | Björk; Sjón | 5:19 |
| 8. | "Sacrifice" | Björk | 4:02 |
| 9. | "Mutual Core" | Björk | 5:06 |
| 10. | "Solstice" | Sjón | 4:41 |
| Total length: | | | 49:26 |

Note: Various releases of the album contain the following bonus tracks:

- Deluxe edition: An extended version of "Hollow", an alternate version of "Dark Matter" (adding choir and organ), and "Náttúra", previously released in 2008.
- Japanese release: "The Comet Song", from the soundtrack to Moomins and the Comet Chase.

== Personnel ==
Credits adapted from Biophilia album liner notes and bjork.com.

=== Musicians ===
- Björk – vocals, all custom instruments except sharpsichord, bassline, beat, beat programming, brass arrangement, choir arrangement, drum programming, gameleste arrangement, hang arrangement, harp arrangement, organ arrangement, programming, sharpsichord arrangement, Tesla coil bassline, Tesla coil bassline programming, vocal arrangement, voice arrangement
- 16bit – bassline, beat, beat programming, programming
- Damian Taylor – beat programming, drum programming, programming, Tesla coil bassline programming
- Leila Arab – bass programming, beat, beat programming, nature sounds, sonic sculpting, sub drone, Tesla coil bassline, Tesla coil bassline programming
- Mark Bell – programming
- Shelley Burgon – harp
- Andy Cavatorta – pendulum harp maker
- Current Value – beat programming
- Sara Cutler – harp
- Henry Dagg – adaptation to sharpsichord, sharpsichord maker
- Manu Delago – hang, hang arrangement
- Pablo Díaz-Reixa – bass programming, beat programming, drum programming
- Carol Emanuel – harp
- Matthew Herbert – beat, beat programming, programming
- Matt Nolan – MIDI-controlled gamelan–celesta hybrid maker
- Zeena Parkins – harp contractor, pendulum
- Mandy Parnell – mastering, mixing
- Björgvin Tómasson – MIDI-controlled pipe organ and MIDI-controlled gamelan–celesta hybrid maker
- Jón Stefánsson – choir conductor
- Choir
  - Ásta Ægisdóttir, Auður Albertsdóttir, Ester Auðunsdóttir, Arnheiður Eiríksdóttir, Ásdís Björg Gestsdóttir, Erla Rún Guðmundsdóttir, Kristín Anna Guðmundsdóttir, Gígja Gylfadóttir, Gígja Haraldsdóttir, Sigrún Ósk Jóhannesdóttir, Fífa Jónsdóttir, Sigurborg Skúladóttir Kaldal, Bergljót Rafnar Karlsdóttir, Jóna G. Kolbrúnardóttir, Kristín Einarsdóttir Mäntylä, Erla María Markúsdóttir, Ásdís Eva Ólafsdóttir, Drífa Örvarsdóttir, Guðrún M. Sigurbergsdóttir, Elín Edda Sigurðardóttir, Unnur Sigurðardóttir, Vigdís Sigurðardóttir, Kristín Sveinsdóttir, Eygló Höskuldsdóttir Viborg
- Brass
  - Ragnhildur Gunnarsdóttir, Valdís Þorkelsdóttir – trumpets
  - Erla Axelsdóttir, Særun Ósk Pálmadóttir, Bergrún Snæbjörnsdóttir, Lilja Valdimarsdóttir – French horns
  - Jessica Buzbee, Harpa Jóhannsdóttir, Sigrún Jónsdóttir, Li Ming Yeung – trombones
  - Brynja Guðmundsdóttir – tuba
  - Zeena Parkins, Carol Emanuel, Sara Culter, Shelley Burgon – harps

=== Technical personnel ===
- Björk – production, mixing
- 16bit – engineering, production
- Damian Taylor – engineering, mixing
- Sveinn Kjartansson – engineering, mixing
- Addi 800 – engineering, mixing
- Andy Baldwin – engineering
- David Bracey – engineering
- Cameron Craig – engineering
- Sonny Ratcliff – engineering
- Curver – engineering, mixing
- Mario DeJesus – engineering
- Derek Birkett – production
- Brian Hernandez – engineer

=== Artwork ===
- M/M Paris – cover
- Inez van Lamsweerde and Vinoodh Matadin – photography

=== Additional personnel ===
- Derek Birkett – business developer
- Árni Heimir Ingólfsson – choir transcription
- David McDuff – English translation
- Matt Robertson – brass transcription, choir transcription, harp score preparation

== Charts ==
=== Weekly charts ===
Weekly chart performance for Biophilia
| Chart (2011) | Peak position |
|---|---|
| Australian Albums (ARIA) | 31 |
| Austrian Albums (Ö3 Austria) | 17 |
| Belgian Albums (Ultratop Flanders) | 13 |
| Belgian Albums (Ultratop Wallonia) | 16 |
| Canadian Albums (Billboard) | 27 |
| Croatian International Albums (HDU) | 8 |
| Czech Albums (ČNS IFPI) | 21 |
| Danish Albums (Hitlisten) | 5 |
| Dutch Albums (Album Top 100) | 17 |
| Finnish Albums (Suomen virallinen lista) | 15 |
| French Albums (SNEP) | 4 |
| German Albums (Offizielle Top 100) | 14 |
| Greek Albums (IFPI) | 6 |
| Irish Albums (IRMA) | 15 |
| Italian Albums (FIMI) | 13 |
| Japanese Albums (Oricon) | 18 |
| Mexican Albums (Top 100) | 27 |
| New Zealand Albums (RMNZ) | 18 |
| Norwegian Albums (VG-lista) | 17 |
| Polish Albums (ZPAV) | 22 |
| Portuguese Albums (AFP) | 10 |
| Russian Albums (2M) | 17 |
| Scottish Albums (Official Charts) | 22 |
| South Korean International Albums (Gaon) Standard edition | 22 |
| South Korean International Albums (Gaon) Deluxe edition | 16 |
| Spanish Albums (Promusicae) | 12 |
| Swedish Albums (Sverigetopplistan) | 14 |
| Swiss Albums (Schweizer Hitparade) | 9 |
| UK Albums (Official Charts) | 21 |
| UK Coalition Albums (OCC) | 3 |
| UK Independent Albums (Official Charts) | 3 |
| US Billboard 200 | 27 |
| US Top Alternative Albums (Billboard) | 5 |
| US Top Dance Albums (Billboard) | 1 |
| US Top Rock Albums (Billboard) | 8 |

=== Year-end charts ===
Year-end chart performance for Biophilia
| Chart (2011) | Position |
|---|---|
| French Albums (SNEP) | 191 |
| US Top Dance/Electronic Albums (Billboard) | 25 |

== Sales ==
Sales for Biophilia
| Region | Sales |
|---|---|
| France | 20,000 |
| United Kingdom | 30,000 |
| United States | 51,000 |

== Release history ==
Release history for Biophilia
| Region | Date | Label |
|---|---|---|
| Japan | 5 October 2011 | Universal |
| Netherlands | 7 October 2011 | Universal |
| Poland | 7 October 2011 | Universal |
| Sweden | 7 October 2011 | Universal |
| Germany | 7 October 2011 | Polydor |
| Ireland | 7 October 2011 | Polydor |
| United Kingdom | 10 October 2011 | One Little Indian |
| Iceland | 10 October 2011 | Smekkleysa |
| France | 10 October 2011 | Universal |
| Hong Kong | 10 October 2011 | Universal |
| Australia | 11 October 2011 | Universal |
| Italy | 11 October 2011 | Universal |
| Canada | 11 October 2011 | Nonesuch |
| United States | 11 October 2011 | Nonesuch |
| Argentina | 14 October 2011 | Universal Music |
| South Korea | 14 October 2011 | Universal Music |
| Taiwan | 14 October 2011 | Universal Music |

== Bibliography ==
- Biophilia – The Manual Edition, with essays by Nicola Dibben. Wellhart Ltd. (2011)
- Biophilia: Live, with essays by Nicola Dibben, edited by James Merry. Wellhart Ltd. (2011)
