= Náttúra =

2008 single by Björk featuring Thom Yorke

Single by Björk featuring Thom Yorke
- Language: Icelandic
- English title: "Nature"
- Released: 20 October 2008
- Length: 3:49
- Label: One Little Indian
- Songwriter: Björk
- Producer: Björk

Björk featuring Thom Yorke singles chronology
"The Dull Flame of Desire" (2008)	"Náttúra" (2008)	"The Comet Song" (2010)

"Náttúra" is a song written and recorded by Icelandic singer Björk featuring English musician Thom Yorke. The track was released as a single promoting the protection of the Icelandic environment. All proceeds from the single were donated to the Náttúra Foundation, the environmental preservation campaign after which the song is named. The single was initially discovered by Björk's French-language fan website and was later confirmed by the singer's representatives. It was released on 20 October 2008 as an iTunes exclusive, and had a wide digital release on 27 October. The song was given a physical release on 20 April 2009, with a white label vinyl released by One Little Indian's web shop. The single was included on the deluxe version of Björk's 2011 album Biophilia.

== Background ==
Pitchfork reported that Radiohead's Thom Yorke contributed to the vocals on "Náttúra". Björk and Yorke previously worked together while recording "I've Seen It All" from Selmasongs, the soundtrack to Dancer in the Dark. Yorke's contribution to the single was initially debated, as Billboard stated that the singer-songwriter had not recorded any new material with Björk since 2000. Björk's publicist confirmed that Yorke's contributions were made via file-sharing during the summer of 2008, while Björk was on her Volta tour. Yorke's voice can be heard as atmospheric haze in the background of the song. Other contributors to the track include Brian Chippendale of Lightning Bolt, and frequent collaborators Mark Bell and Matthew Herbert.

This is Björk's first solo single to be released entirely in Icelandic. It is also the first not to have a corresponding album or video. However, it is bundled with the digital download and included on the digipak edition of Björk's 2011 album Biophilia.

== Formats and track listings ==
Digital single

1. "Náttúra" – 3:49

12" white label

1. "Náttúra" (Switch Remix) – 5:18
2. "Náttúra" – 3:49

== Personnel ==
- Björk – vocals, production
- Thom Yorke – backing vocals
- Brian Chippendale - drums

== Charts ==
Chart performance for "Náttúra"
Chart (2008)	Peak position
Canadian Digital Song Sales (Billboard)	75
Iceland (RÚV)	26
Sweden (Sverigetopplistan)	39
UK Singles (OCC)	102
