= Michael van der Ham =

Dutch womenswear designer (born 1985)

Michael van der Ham (born 1985, Giessenburg) is a Dutch womenswear designer who graduated from Central Saint Martins in 2009.

He has designed costumes for Björk and Tori Amos as well as for the 2012 Summer Olympics Opening Ceremony.

== Collaborations ==
Michael van der Ham For Brora 2012.

Marks & Spencer 2016

The designer stopped showing at London Fashion Week in 2015, but teamed up with Sophia Webster to design dresses to accompany her shoes for S/S 18.
