= Virus (Björk song) =

Single by Björk

from the album Biophilia
- Released: 9 August 2011
- Length: 5:26
- Label: One Little Indian
- Songwriters: Bjork; Sjón
- Producer: Björk

Björk singles chronology
"Cosmogony" (2011)	"Virus" (2011)	"Moon" (2011)

"Virus" is a song by Icelandic artist Björk released as the third single from the album Biophilia. Each song in the album features a theme related to nature. In "Virus", Björk explores "fatal relationships" such as the one between a virus and a cell, as Björk explained in an interview: "It's a kind of a love story between a virus and a cell. And of course the virus loves the cell so much that it destroys it."

== Background and composition ==
"Virus" features a gameleste (a hybrid between a celesta and a gamelan that can be controlled by midi and that was also used in "Crystalline", built exclusively for these songs) base that plays through the whole song. The gameleste represents the 'virus' that continues multiplying until it takes control at the end of the song. Also, Manu Delago plays hang drum. Since Björk wanted the album to break the typical 4/4 time signature, "Virus" has a time signature of 3/4, running at a tempo of 120 beats per minute.

The lyrics to "Virus" talk about "dangerous relationships", symbiotic relationships in which one organism is parasite for the other and takes a benefit, even changing the other's behaviour. This fact is used as a metaphor between 'love' and 'parasiting'. Björk took inspitation from a McGraw-Hill educative video about mind-controlling parasites and from candidiasis, illness that she suffered:

Still from the 'Virus' app

I'd been fighting this candida issue in my throat and I had to really change my diet and use different medication and it sort of seems to pop up and its kinda hilarious. It’s like I have this new neighbour that I have to sort of learn to live with. And obviously you know this fungus is inside all of us and it’s never about eliminating it. You have to kind of just live with it.

=== App ===
The "Virus" app is a video game where a virus attempts to infect healthy cells; the user can control the cells and flick nuclei into the healthy cells, or watch the infection occur in "Video" mode. The user can also try to stop the infection, but if the virus is defeated, the song stops playing. If the virus is prevented the song will stop playing. By tapping on the cells, the user can also make his or her own music.

== Official versions ==
- Album version – 5:26
- Single version – 5:20
- Hudson Mohawke Peaches and Guacamol Remix – 4:51 released on Part 3 of the Biophilia Remix Series
- Matthew Herbert's Fever Mix – 7:07 released on Part 6 of the Biophilia Remix Series
- MIF live version – 5:47 (Biophilia: Manual Edition CD2)

== Charts ==
Chart performance for "Virus"
Chart (2011)	Peak position
UK Indie (OCC)	35
