= Cosmogony (song) =

Single by Björk

from the album Biophilia
- B-side: "Crystalline"; "Thunderbolt"
- Released: 19 July 2011
- Length: 4:51
- Label: One Little Indian
- Songwriters: Bjork; Sjón
- Producer: Björk

Björk singles chronology
| "Crystalline" (2011) | "Cosmogony" (2011) | "Virus" (2011) |

"Cosmogony" is a song by Icelandic artist Björk, released as the second single from her seventh album Biophilia. The song was released on iTunes on July 19, 2011. It was also released as an app, which served as the "mother app" for the Biophilia app. It was released as part of The Crystalline Series alongside the first single from the album "Crystalline" on CD and vinyl.

== Development and composition ==
In January 2011, when the app Solar System by Touch Press was released, it was accompanied by an instrumental introduction written by Björk. This song was the instrumental version of "Cosmogony". In March 2011 it was announced that Björk would play at the Manchester International Festival with a new concept of concert. Several songs from the album debuted during a series of performances at the festival between June 27 and July 16, 2011. Björk called the performances a "meditation on the relationship between music, nature and technology"."Special" instruments were designed and constructed specifically for these concerts.

"Cosmogony" is a calm and warm song, marking the link between the previous Björk project, Volta and Biophilia, using distorted brass, but in a much more intimate soft way. It has a time signature 4/4, and runs at a slow tempo of 60 beats per minute. The lyrics to "Cosmogony" are also far from the rest of the songs on the album, while those are focused on technic or metaphoric facts about a natural phenomenon, the "Cosmogony" lyrics turn into a philosophic view, based on several myths about the creation of the universe. Björk explained:

This song is the "music of the spheres" song for me... So it's all about copper and rotating things and harmony and equilibrium and the universe and where there’ s a place for every little thing and we're all taken care of.

Björk also considers the song as some kind of joke, branding the Big Bang theory as a 20th-century creation myth:

I guess after watching documentaries about string theory, [the song] was sort of a personal joke [...] Big Bang [is] 20th Century and string theory [is] so 21st Century [...] I guess all creation myths at the time of their making were science. I’ll bet the pharaohs thought pyramids and mummies were the future – that was pretty science fiction. 3000 years later it is just mythology and the creation myth. In this song you have 4 verses. The first verse is the American native creation myth, next verse is Sanskrit creation myth, the 3rd verse is Aboriginal creation myth and the 4th verse is Big Bang theory.

== Promotion ==
=== App ===
Every song on Biophilia has an app for iPhone or iPad. The main app was released on July 19, 2011, coinciding with the release of "Cosmogony", and it integrates all the songs' apps.

"Cosmogony" is the "mother app" that consists of the main menu of all of the other apps connected to Biophilia. Visually, it is a 3D universe designed by M/M (Paris) that can be explored that includes shortcuts to the rest of the apps.

=== Live performances ===
Björk debuted all songs from Biophilia during a series of performances at the Manchester International Festival in England between 27 June and 16 July 2011. Björk performed Biophilia tracks and music from her back catalogue with a small group of musical collaborators, including Graduale Nobili, an Icelandic female choir.

Björk performed "Cosmogony", alongside "Crystalline" and "Thunderbolt" live on BBC2's Later... with Jools Holland. On November 22, 2011, the performance of "Crystalline" was broadcast, while the performances of "Cosmogony" and "Thunderbolt" were shown on November 25. On January 31, 2012, Björk performed "Cosmogony" live on The Colbert Report, wearing an Iris Van Herpen blue dress and a red wig. She sang the song accompanied by Icelandic choir Graduale Nobili, snare drum and percussion played by Chris Thompson, and a set of iPads that produced beats, played by Max Weisel. Her performance was well received by critics who deemed it as "heavenly" and "pretty euphoric".

== Track listing ==
"Cosmogony" digital download

1. Cosmogony (Serban Ghenea Mix) – 4:49

The Crystalline Series – Serban Ghenea Mixes CD/LP/digital download

1. "Crystalline" (Serban Ghenea Mix) – 5:06
2. "Cosmogony" (Serban Ghenea Mix) – 4:49

The Crystalline Series – Omar Souleyman Versions CD/LP/digital download

1. "Crystalline" (Omar Souleyman Remix) – 6:41
2. "Thunderbolt" (Omar Souleyman Remix) (listed as "Tesla") – 7:24
3. "Mawal" (Performed by Omar Souleyman) – 3:46

The Crystalline Series – Crystalline Matthew Herbert Mixes CD/LP/digital download

1. "Crystalline" (Matthew Herbert Mix) – 5:17
2. "Crystalline" (Matthew Herbert Instrumental) – 5:15

The Crystalline Series – Cosmogony Matthew Herbert Mixes CD/LP/digital download

1. "Cosmogony" (Matthew Herbert Mix 1) – 5:03
2. "Cosmogony" (Matthew Herbert Mix 2) – 4:17
3. "Cosmogony" (Matthew Herbert Instrumental 1) – 5:05
4. "Cosmogony" (Matthew Herbert Instrumental 2) – 4:15

== Official versions ==
- Album version – 5:01
- Serban Ghenea Mix – 4:51
- Matthew Herbert Mix 1 – 5:04
- Matthew Herbert Mix 2 – 4:17
- Matthew Herbert Instrumental 1 – 5:05
- Matthew Herbert Instrumental 2 – 4:15
- El Guincho Remix – 6:21 released on Part 3 of the Biophilia Remix Series
- MIF live version – 5:24 (Biophilia: Manual Edition CD2)
- Brass Instrumental version – 2:58 (released in early 2011 to accompany the Solar System App)

== Charts ==
Chart performance for "Cosmogony"
| Chart (2011) | Peak position |
|---|---|
| Iceland (RÚV) | 23 |
| UK Singles Sales Chart (OCC) | 38 |
| UK Indie (OCC) | 31 |
| US Dance/Electronic Digital Songs (Billboard) | 44 |

== Release history ==
Release history and formats for "Cosmogony"
| Country | Date | Format | Label |
|---|---|---|---|
| Various | 19 July 2011 | "Cosmogony" digital download | One Little Indian |
| Various | 19 July 2011 | Serban Ghenea Mixes: CD; LP; digital download | One Little Indian |
| Various | 26 July 2011 | Omar Souleyman Versions: CD; LP; digital download | One Little Indian |
| Various | 2 August 2011 | Crystalline Matthew Herbert Mixes: CD; LP; digital download | One Little Indian |
| Various | 2 August 2011 | Cosmogony Matthew Herbert Mixes: CD; LP; digital download | One Little Indian |
