= 16bit (band) =

Electronic music duo

- Origin: London, England
- Genres: Dubstep, electronic
- Years active: 2007–2012
- Label: MTA
- Members: Eddie Jefferys; Jason Morrison

16bit were an English electronic music duo, consisting of Eddie Jefferys and Jason Morrison. They were signed to Chase & Status' MTA Records, and best known for their work with Björk.

== Biography ==
16bit were composed of Eddie Jefferys from South London and Jason Morrison from Bath, Somerset. Both became interested in electronic music at an early age, citing jungle, and garage as their main influences. They were best known for producing dubstep and made their debut release in January 2009 with In The Death Car EP featuring the track "Chainsaw Calligraphy" which was recognised for its innovative qualities at the time.

Fourteen of 16bit's songs were used as the soundtrack for the iOS and WiiWare video game Lilt Line.

The duo co-produced "Crystalline" and "Mutual Core" off Björk's 2011 album Biophilia. They subsequently remixed both "Mutual Core" and "Hollow". The album was nominated for two Grammy awards. Jefferys and Morrison went to Brooklyn where they worked with the artist for a week. Björk explained that "I was really torn about whether to use their version of 'Hollow' on the album. Their beats for 'Crystalline' and 'Mutual Core' made it on there, but in the end 'Hollow' wound up on the remix album". While Jefferys said of the collaboration that "working with such abstract time signatures was definitely a strange mix of confusing and enjoyable. She has been so successful without compromising her music or herself". They produced the single "At Your Inconvenience" from the eponymous album of Professor Green. In 2012, the duo had also produced the track "I Am the Narrator" from Plan B's third studio album iLL Manors.

Their 2010 remix of Noisia's "Machine Gun" was used in a trailer and various TV spots for Transformers: Dark of the Moon. The remix was also used in the trailer for Far Cry 3.

In 2010, their track 'Jump' was featured in the Nike commercial 'Hit The Target'.

16bit won 'Best Mix' at the 2010 Dubstep Forum Awards for their 'Milky Pie Mix' and came second top in the Best Producer category. Although they stated that the intention was to release an album, it never materialised. In mid-2012, the duo split to pursue solo production careers for unknown reasons. Jefferys relocated to Chicago.

Eddie Jefferys has since released music under the alias "Moody Good". He released his debut album with MTA Records and Owsla on 2 June 2014. On 15 May 2015 the six track EP "This Is The Investigation" was released under NEST/OWSLA as a free download. Jefferys also produced a single for the rap group Foreign Beggars entitled "Anywhere", provided additional production for the Chase & Status track "Gangsta Boogie" also remixed Yogi's single featuring Pusha T 'Burial' and NOISIA 'Get Deaded' for their remix album.

Jason Morrison was also working on his own solo project known as The 13, but he eventually decided to retire the project. He is currently working under the alternative alias "jaswan", which he has released music under various record labels. On 20 April 2020 he realised his debut album titled '2012-2020' with collection of tracks that he worked on during that period.

== Discography ==
=== Albums and EPs ===
- Put Ya Dirt Inside/Ford Fiesta (10") (2008) [Destpub]
- PCP/President of Europe (12") (2008) [Urban Essentials]
- In The Death Car EP (12") (2009) [Boka Records]
- Texaco (12") (2009) [Veri Lo Records]
- Cobra/Jump/Can You Show Me What Head Is (12") (2009) [Southside Dubstars]
- Swine Flu/What Time Is It? (12") (2009) [Audio Freaks]
- The Tale of the Exploding Fist EP (12") (2009) [Southside Dubstars]
- Serum (12") (2009) [Mindset]
- FRZR9000/Skullcrack (12") (2011) [MTA Records]
- Panic (12") (2010) [Heavy Artillery]
- Chainsaw Calligraphy: The Remixes (12") (2010) [Boka Records]
- 16 Bit Edition 1 (12") (2011) [Together As One]
- 16 Bit Edition 2 (12") (2011) [Together As One]
- Dinosaurs/Boston Cream (12") (2011) [MTA Records]

=== Remixes ===
- Torqux – "Relentless" (2009)
- SKisM – "The Blank" (2009)
- PropaTingz feat. Dakini – "Babylon's Scared" (2009)
- Little Dragon – "Twice" (2009, unofficial release)
- Plan B – "She Said" (2010)
- Noisia – "Machine Gun" (2010)
- Kissy Sell Out – "Garden Friends" (2010)
- Professor Green – "Jungle" (2011)
- Amon Tobin – "Surge" (2011)
- Chase & Status – "Hitz" (2011)
- Wolfgang Gartner feat. will.i.am – "Forever" (2011)
- Björk – "Hollow" (2012)
- Björk – "Mutual Core" (2012)
- Kidnappa – "Rukus" (released 2014)
