= Moon (Björk song) =

Single by Björk

from the album Biophilia
- Released: 6 September 2011
- Length: 5:45
- Label: One Little Indian
- Songwriter: Björk
- Producer: Björk

Björk singles chronology
"Virus" (2011)	"Moon" (2011)	"The Gate" (2017)

Music video
- "Moon" on YouTube

"Moon" is a song by Icelandic artist Björk. It is the first track on her album Biophilia and was released as the fourth and final single before the release of the album on September 6, 2011. Each song in the album features a theme related to nature. In "Moon", Björk explores the lunar cycles and the effect they have on Earth.

== Background and composition ==
The song "Moon" is based on four different sequences played by four different harpists: Zeena Parkins, Shelley Burgon, Sara Cutler, Carol Emanuel. These sequences repeat throughout the song, resembling the lunar cycles. The song has 17/8 time signature with instrumental sections in 5/8. The lyrics to "Moon" deals with themes such as rebirth, start over and mythology, making reference to the Moon as "adrenalin pearls placed in the gods' mouths".

About the song, Björk explained: "With each new moon we complete a cycle and are offered renewal —to take risks, to connect with other people, to love, to give. The symbolism of the moon as the realm of imagination, melancholy, and regeneration is expressed in the song"

== Music video ==
The music video for "Moon" premiered on September 23, 2011, in Björk's official YouTube page. In the video, Björk's image is alternated with images of the Moon, resembling the moon's phases. The singer wears the same orange wig and brown costume that is seen in the Biophilia album cover.

== Promotion ==
Stills from the music video and the 'Moon' app, both featuring images of the Moon, that in the music video are juxtaposing with frames of Björk holding a crystal(left).

=== Music video ===
The video for "Moon" was directed by Björk, M/M Paris, Inez & Vinoodh and James Merry and recorded spontaneously during the photo sessions for Biophilia. Björk sings the song with the orange crystal that also features on the Biophilia album and singles cover, in one take. Images from the 'Moon' app appear superposed throughout the video.

=== App ===
The 'Moon' app for iPad and iPhone was developed by 18-year-old programmer Max Weisel, and is a musical sequencer which features 17 moons (representing each pulse of a time bar in the song). By changing the position of each moon, one changes the note it produces, thus forming a new melody each time which can be played with Björk's voice. The app also allows one to play the original song.

== Track listing ==
Digital download

1. "Moon" – 5:40

== Official versions ==
- Album version – 5:45
- Single version – 5:40
- The Slips Remix – 6:09 released on Part 8 of the Biophilia Remix Series
- MIF live version – 6:22 (Biophilia: Manual Edition CD2)
