= Crystalline (song) =

Single by Björk

from the album Biophilia
- B-side: "Cosmogony"; "Thunderbolt"
- Released: 28 June 2011
- Length: 5:05
- Label: One Little Indian
- Songwriter: Björk
- Producers: Bjork; 16bit

Björk singles chronology
| "The Comet Song" (2010) | "Crystalline" (2011) | "Cosmogony" (2011) |

Music video
- "Crystalline" on YouTube

"Crystalline" is a song by Icelandic artist Björk, released as the lead single from her seventh album Biophilia. It was released as a single on 28 June 2011 accompanied by an iPad app developed exclusively for the song. It was afterward released as part of The Crystalline Series alongside the second single from the album, "Cosmogony".

== Development ==
In March 2011, it was announced that Björk would play at the Manchester International Festival with a new concept of concert. Several songs from the album debuted during a series of performances at the festival between 27 June and 16 July 2011. Björk called the performances a "meditation on the relationship between music, nature and technology". "Special" instruments were designed and constructed specifically for these concerts.

"Crystalline"
A 28-second audio sample of "Crystalline".

The release was preceded by three teasers: on the first one, entitled "Road to Crystalline" we can see Björk driving her Hummer through a road in Iceland while playing an excerpt of a demo version of the song; on the second one, we could see one of the new instruments developed for the Manchester performances, that also plays on the track: the 'Gameleste', a celesta which was modified by Icelandic Organ builder, Björgvin Tómasson and British Cymbalsmith and Gong maker, Matt Nolan so that it sounds like Gamelan and could be played remotely by MIDI or even an iPad; and on the third teaser, recording sessions of the remix featuring Omar Souleyman were shown. The song leaked onto the internet on 25 June 2011. On 28 June 2011, UK producers 16bit confirmed via Facebook that they produced the song.

"Crystalline" is a mostly electronic song, featuring a continuous 'gameleste' base and electronic beats and rhythm. After the bridge, the song features a gameleste solo, and ends with a drum and bass section which uses the Amen break. A review in The Guardian described the piece as a hybrid of the musical styles of her previous albums Post and Vespertine, with undercurrent percussive elements from her album Homogenic.

The lyrics to "Crystalline" talk about the process of crystallization in minerals and rocks but taking a more personal point of view, relating the growth of a crystal structure with the growth of relationships in people's hearts. Björk took inspiration for the song from cities and buildings:

I've sat a lot of my life in buses and taxis from 20 years of touring and somehow all these different types of intersections have gone on file in my brain. Like some have three streets meeting with very tall buildings on all sides while others are complex with like five street meeting but all buildings are low and so on… Seems like each one of them has a different mood, different spatial tension or release. Part of my obsessive nature wants to map out each intersection in the world and match it with a song… To me crystal structures seem to grow in a similar way.

== Promotion ==
=== Music video ===
The music video for "Crystalline" was recorded on 26 May and was directed by long-time collaborator Michel Gondry. It was premiered on 26 July 2011 on YouTube. The video opens with a view of the moon and a meteor shower on it, forming different forms and crystals. Björk stars as a spectator of the meteor rain in the sky, as some kind of god. The video features heavy computer and stop-motion animation. Gondry said:

We filmed the clip still by still, exposing the film several times. I decided that, in the clip, the meteor shower would fall onto the ground and make a sound. The idea of a ray of light provocating an impact on those things and making them move intrigated me. Then, they create wavelets, just like rain. On the third verse, they create bubbles where metallic objects appear. All this resulted from several conversations I had with Björk about these matters.

The video received a nomination at the Antville Music Video Awards, in the Best Art Direction category.

=== Apps ===
Every song on Biophilia has an app for iPhone or iPad. The main app was released on 19 July 2011, coinciding with the release of "Cosmogony", and it integrates all the songs' apps. The app for "Crystalline" is a video game that uses the iPod Touch/iPhone/iPad's tilt feature to move a crystal through various tunnels. By collecting different crystals from the walls of the tunnel, new tunnels are unlocked, each one playing a different section of the song. Green tunnels play sections from the first verse, pink tunnels play sections from the second one, orange tunnels play sections from the third verse, red tunnels play the chorus and blue tunnels play the coda.

=== Live performances ===
Björk debuted the songs during a series of performances at the Manchester International Festival in England between 27 June and 16 July 2011. Björk performed Biophilia tracks and music from her back catalogue with a small group of musical collaborators, including Graduale Nobili, an Icelandic female choir. She performed "Crystalline" during every concert of the Biophilia tour.

Björk performed the songs live on BBC2's Later... with Jools Holland. On 22 November 2011 the performance of "Crystalline" was broadcast, while the performances of "Cosmogony" and "Thunderbolt" were shown on 25 November.

== Track listing ==
"Crystalline" digital download

1. Crystalline (Serban Ghenea Mix) – 5:06

The Crystalline Series – Serban Ghenea Mixes CD/LP/digital download

1. "Crystalline" (Serban Ghenea Mix) – 5:06
2. "Cosmogony" (Serban Ghenea Mix) – 4:49

The Crystalline Series – Omar Souleyman Versions CD/LP/digital download

1. "Crystalline" (Omar Souleyman Remix) – 6:41
2. "Thunderbolt" (Omar Souleyman Remix) (listed as "Tesla") – 7:24
3. "Mawal" (Performed by Omar Souleyman) – 3:46

The Crystalline Series – Crystalline Matthew Herbert Mixes CD/LP/digital download

1. "Crystalline" (Matthew Herbert Mix) – 5:17
2. "Crystalline" (Matthew Herbert Instrumental) – 5:15

The Crystalline Series – Cosmogony Matthew Herbert Mixes CD/LP/digital download

1. "Cosmogony" (Matthew Herbert Mix 1) – 5:03
2. "Cosmogony" (Matthew Herbert Mix 2) – 4:17
3. "Cosmogony" (Matthew Herbert Instrumental 1) – 5:05
4. "Cosmogony" (Matthew Herbert Instrumental 2) – 4:15

== Official versions ==
- Album version – 5:08
- Serban Ghenea Mix/Single Mix – 5:06
- Radio edit/Serban Ghenea Mix Edit – 3:47
- Omar Souleyman Remix – 6:41
- Matthew Herbert Mix – 5:17
- Matthew Herbert Instrumental – 5:15
- Current Value Remix – 5:02 released on Part 1 of the Biophilia Remix Series
- MIF live version – 5:26 (Biophilia: Manual Edition CD2)
- PMRH version – 5:21 (demo version, stream available for a limited time on Icelandair In-flights)

== Charts ==
| Chart (2011) | Peak position |
|---|---|
| Brazil (Billboard Hot 100) | 93 |
| Brazil (Billboard Hot Pop Songs) | 20 |
| Iceland (RÚV) | 12 |
| Japan Hot 100 (Billboard) | 18 |
| Portugal (AFP) | 43 |
| UK Coalition (Official Charts Company) | 1 |
| UK Indie (Official Charts) | 29 |
| UK Physical Singles Chart (OCC) | 9 |
| US Dance/Electronic Digital Songs (Billboard) | 21 |
| US Rock Digital Songs (Billboard) | 49 |

== Release history ==
| Country | Date | Format | Label |
|---|---|---|---|
| Worldwide | 28 June 2011 | "Crystalline" Digital download | One Little Indian |
| Worldwide | 19 July 2011 | Serban Ghenea Mixes: CD; LP; digital download | One Little Indian |
| Worldwide | 26 July 2011 | Omar Souleyman Versions: CD; LP; digital download | One Little Indian |
| Worldwide | 2 August 2011 | Crystalline Matthew Herbert Mixes: CD; LP; digital download | One Little Indian |
| Worldwide | 2 August 2011 | Cosmogony Matthew Herbert Mixes: CD; LP; digital download | One Little Indian |
