= Björk videography =

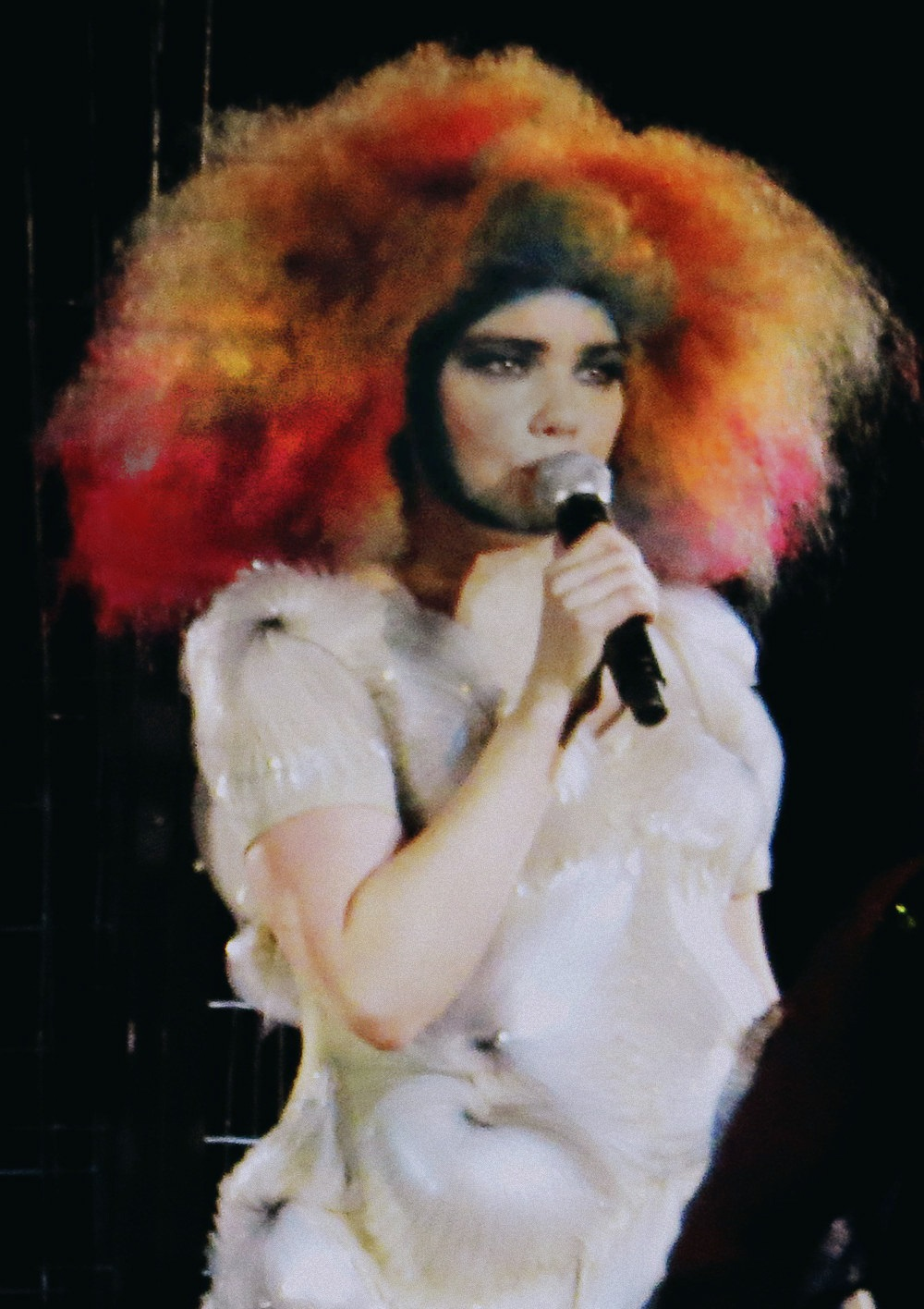
- Björk performing at Le Cirque en Chantier, Paris, during her Biophilia tour (2013)
- Music videos: 68
- Video albums: 20
- Feature films: 4

Icelandic singer-songwriter Björk has released 68 music videos (including 3 as a featured artist), 7 concert films, 5 music video compilations, 2 television performance video albums, 4 documentary videos and 2 video albums box sets. She also appeared in 4 feature films as an actress and has made several television appearances and cameos, in addition to providing music and score to multiple movies. In 1992, Björk left her previous band, the Sugarcubes, and started her solo career with the release of her album Debut. Her first music video taken from the album was "Human Behaviour", directed by French director Michel Gondry, with whom she started a career-spanning collaboration. The video, followed by "Big Time Sensuality", "Army of Me", "It's Oh So Quiet", the latter two from her second studio album Post (1995), received heavy airplay on MTV channels and popularised her image. Starting with the videos taken from Homogenic (1997), as stated in a retrospective review from Philip Sherburne, her videos became "crucial" to build the world of her albums. She also started to experiment with CGI elements, as shown by videos like "Jóga" or "Hunter". "All Is Full of Love", directed by Chris Cunningham, received general acclaim from critics, went on to win two MTV Video Music Awards and was included in MoMA permanent collection.

In 1999, the singer was approached by Danish director Lars von Trier to star in his movie Dancer in the Dark (2000). It was Björk's second feature film lead appearance, having previously starred in the Icelandic television movie, Glerbrot (1987), and Nietzchka Keene's The Juniper Tree (1990). For her performance in Dancer in the Dark, Björk received critical acclaim, was nominated for two Golden Globe Awards and one Academy Award, and won the Best Actress Award at the 2000 Cannes Film Festival. For her 2001 album Vespertine, Björk wanted to convey a more minimalistic and intimate image in her videos, resulting in videos like "Pagan Poetry" and "Cocoon", which were banned from prime-time MTV airplay. In 2003, Björk started a collaboration with collective LynnFox (Note: LynnFox consisted of Christian McKenzie, Patrick Chen and Bastian Glassner), which provided several visual that served as backdrops for her Greatest Hits tour and also the video for "Oceania", which was projected during her 2004 Summer Olympics opening ceremony performance. In 2005, Björk starred as the female lead actress in Matthew Barney's Drawing Restraint 9, for which she also composed the soundtrack. Björk's music video for "Wanderlust", directed by Encyclopedia Pictura (Note: Encyclopedia Pictura consists of Isaiah Saxon, Daren Rabinovitch and Sean Hellfritsch), received attention for being one of the first 3D music video.

Björk's 2011 multimedia project Biophilia, included her seventh studio album, a world tour, an app and a series of educational workshops. To document the album's creation and themes, Björk collaborated with British Natural historian David Attenborough, and filmed the documentary When Björk Met Attenborough, narrated by Tilda Swinton. The tour's final show at Alexandra Palace in London was premiered as a concert film during 2014 Tribeca Film Festival. Coinciding with the release of Vulnicura (2015), Björk was honored by the MoMa with an artist retrospective, for which she was commissioned a music video for her song "Black Lake". Subsequently, the singer started to experiment with virtual reality videos, resulting in work like "Stonemilker", "Notget" and "Quicksand", which was premiered as the first YouTube virtual reality live stream. All these videos were part of the Björk Digital exhibition, which premiered at Carriageworks, Sydney in 2016, and were later included in the Vulnicura VR album, which was firstly released on Steam in September 2019. Björk's recent videos continue to be received favorably, with her 2017 video for "The Gate" being named the best music video of 2017 by Pitchfork.

== Music videos ==
=== 1990s ===
Title	Year	Director(s)	Description	Album	Ref.
"Ooops" 808 State featuring Björk	1991	Óskar Jónasson	Filmed in Iceland, it shows a member of 808 State and Björk traveling in a car, and then playing the song inside a grotto.	Ex:el	
"Human Behaviour"	1993	Michel Gondry	Björk sings various parts of the song while in a forest and being chased by an animated stuffed bear. The video is a loose take on Goldilocks and the Three Bears.	Debut	
"Venus as a Boy"	1993	Sophie Muller	The video portrays Björk in a kitchen, fondling and cooking eggs. At one point, she is seen caressing a bearded dragon. The video was inspired by the book Story of the Eye by Georges Bataille.	Debut	
"Play Dead"	1993	Danny Cannon	The video consists of scenes taken from the film The Young Americans, interspersed with scenes of Björk singing in a darkly lit church.	Debut	
"Big Time Sensuality"	1993	Stéphane Sednaoui	Shot in black and white and features Björk dancing on the back of a moving truck slowly driving through New York City in the middle of the day. The video uses film effects like slow motion and fast motion.	Debut	
"Violently Happy"	1994	Jean-Baptiste Mondino	The video seemingly takes place in a padded room of a mental institute. Björk is portrayed singing the song in a white dress resembling an open straitjacket with pieces of hair surrounding her. Norman Reedus appears in the video as an inmate of the psychiatric ward.	Debut	
"Army of Me"	1995	Michel Gondry	In the video, Björk drives a gigantic truck and then heads to a gorilla dentist, who tries to remove and steal a diamond hidden in her mouth. The video faced backlash for the inclusion of Björk bombing an art museum at the end of the video, in the wake of the Oklahoma City bombing.	Post	
"Isobel"	1995	Michel Gondry	The black-and-white video portrays various surreal scenes, including a long-haired Björk playing a water-powered piano. Another scene shows various airplanes being formed inside light bulbs which sprout from the ground, and the end features Björk juxtaposed with a waterfall.	Post	
"It's Oh So Quiet"	1995	Spike Jonze	Based on Jacques Demy's 1964 film Les Parapluies de Cherbourg, it features everything in slow motion as Björk sings the verses; during the riotous chorus, everything returns to regular speed and everyone near her dances along. The visual went on to become one of her most recognised music videos and won the award for Best Choreography at the 1996 MTV Video Music Awards.	Post	
"Hyperballad"	1996	Michel Gondry	Various projections, including a video-game avatar resembling Björk jumping off a cliff, are shown on a shot of her face.	Post	
"Possibly Maybe"	1996	Stéphane Sednaoui	The video follows Björk as she is shown performing the song in various rooms. In each location she is dressed in a different way and interacts with different objects.	Post	
"I Miss You"	1997	John Kricfalusi	A partly animated video that features a red-haired Björk dancing and interacting with several other characters, which resemble the ones from The Ren & Stimpy Show. At points, a live version of Björk is mixed in the footage. Fred Flintstone makes a cameo as a shampoo bottle.	Post	
"Jóga"	1997	Michel Gondry	The video shows different Icelandic terrains and landscapes with Björk appearing only in the beginning and towards the end. With the aid of CGI, earthquakes begin to separate and shift the chunks of land along fault lines. The video ends with a computerised image of an island floating inside Björk's chest.	Homogenic	
"Bachelorette"	1997	Michel Gondry	It features Björk as "Bachelorette", a woman who finds a book titled My Story buried in her garden that begins to write itself. She takes the book to a publishing house. The book becomes incredibly popular and is turned into a musical, featuring Bachelorette as herself. When the book becomes unpopular, the setting, which utilises the Droste effect to multiply the space, devolves into Bachelorette's garden, where the book finds its resting place once again.	Homogenic	
"Hunter"	1998	Paul White	A bald Björk passionately sings looking into the camera; as she shakes and moves her head, she begins to morph into a polar bear. Towards the end of the video, she completely transforms into the "techno-bear", before returning to her original state and the image once again fading out to white.	Homogenic	
"Alarm Call"	1998	Alexander McQueen	Features Björk floating on a raft on a river in the jungle; her scenes are intercut with footage of snakes, crocodiles, and other animals, with Björk playing with them. A first version of the video, directed by Paul White, was previously scrapped.	Homogenic	
"All Is Full of Love"	1999	Chris Cunningham	In the critically lauded video, an ethereal, white room is shown, where a robot with Björk's features lies in a fetal position. As the room lights up, two mechanical arms begin to assemble the robot. The robot looks up to see another robotic Björk as the machines stop the assembly. It smiles and extends its hand to the sitting robot, joining in the song. The robots passionately kiss and embrace while the machines assemble their backs and light comes and goes. The video won the MTV Video Music Award for Best Visual Effects and Breakthrough Video.	Homogenic	

=== 2000s ===
Title	Year	Director(s)	Description	Album	Ref.
"I've Seen It All"	2000	Floria Sigismondi	An interactive "webeo" (a web animation) for an MTV promotion. Björk appears with her face painted and the viewer could change the scenes and special effects by clicking on the video. The main version of the video (2nd) is an excerpt from the film Dancer in the Dark in which Björk, Peter Stormare and others sing the song on a train.	Selmasongs	
"Hidden Place"	2001	M/M Paris (Note: M/M Paris consists of Mathias Augustyniak and Michael Amzalag), Inez and Vinoodh	The video consists of close-up shots panning around Björk's face, as fluids flow in and out of her facial orifices.	Vespertine	
"Pagan Poetry"	2001	Nick Knight	The video features highly blurry and stylised images of explicit sex, including fellatio and ejaculation, and images of large needles sewing pearls to skin. The second half of the video features Björk in a dress designed by Alexander McQueen, which covers only the lower portion of her body. The video ends with a shot of a corset piercing.	Vespertine	
"Cocoon"	2002	Eiko Ishioka	The video begins with many apparently nude Björks singing. Throughout the video, red threads emerge from her nipples and circulate between her breasts and nose, finally enveloping her in a cocoon.	Vespertine	
"It's in Our Hands"	2002	Spike Jonze	Shot in night-vision while Björk was pregnant, it features the singer in a forest, as various animals and plants are shot using perspective, which makes them appear larger than the singer.	Greatest Hits	
"Nature Is Ancient"	2002	Lynn Fox	The video depicts the beginning of life on a microscopic level. At the end, a baby inside of a womb is shown.	Family Tree	
"Unravel"	2003	Lynn Fox	It portrays a devil figure pulling out a thread from an opening on Björk's back.	Backdrops for the Greatest Hits tour	
"Pluto"	2003	Lynn Fox	It shows Icelandic actor Ingvar Sigurdsson, naked and furiously simulating masturbation until his head explodes.	Backdrops for the Greatest Hits tour	
"It's in Our Hands" (Soft Pink Truth Mix)	2003	Lynn Fox	The video mixes sepia-coloured old photos with animated drawings.	Backdrops for the Greatest Hits tour	
"Desired Constellation"	2003	Lynn Fox	The video features a sky with various flying objects passing by.	Backdrops for the Greatest Hits tour	
"Nameless"	2003	Lynn Fox	It features a demo version of the song later renamed "Storm".	Backdrops for the Greatest Hits tour	
"Oceania"	2004	Lynn Fox	Björk is depicted as "Mother Oceania", with her face adorned with crystals. The camera pans down to show dark and deep water, with Björk appearing out of the dark background, singing and covered with sparkling jewels. Images of jellyfish swim around and away from Björk, carried by the currents, which move in time with the song. A version of the video was projected during Björk's performance at the 2004 Summer Olympics opening ceremony.	Medúlla	
"Who Is It"	2004	Dawn Shadforth	In the video, Björk wears a dress made of bells, by Alexander McQueen, and performs the song while accompanied by a group of children, also wearing outfits adorned with bells. The version of the song featured in the video is the "Bell Choir Mix".	Medúlla	
"Triumph of a Heart"	2005	Spike Jonze	The video portrays Björk and her cat husband, seemingly unhappy, as she escapes to the city to party in a bar, and eventually getting drunk and hurting herself before spending the night out in a field. The next morning, her husband goes to find her and they reconcile.	Medúlla	
"Where Is the Line"	2005	Gabríela Friðriksdóttir	In the video, Björk represents an earth goddess which gives birth to a convulsing person. The entity yells and writhes around the singer before returning inside of her. It was premiered during Gabríela Friðriksdóttir's exposition at the Venice Biennale in 2005, as one of the three pieces from the artist's Versations Tetralogia.	Medúlla	
"Earth Intruders"	2007	Michel Ocelot	The video portrays Björk's face singing the song in a graphic-rendered sky while various silhouettes of tribes are shown marching, dancing, running and shooting various weapons.	Volta	
"Innocence"	2007	Fred & Annabelle	In March 2007, Björk launched the "Innocence" video contest, in which amateur directors could send their own interpretation of the song in form of a music video. The winning video features Björk's avatar, as shown on the Volta album cover, singing the song as various entities surround her. Other videos sent for the competition were included in the Voltaïc box set.	Volta	
"Declare Independence"	2007	Michel Gondry	Portrays Björk singing the song on a megaphone linked to various people in front of her. As they all jump, a platform elevates and activates a roll of paper that is sprayed and painted upon by other people.	Volta	
"Wanderlust"	2008	Encyclopedia Pictura	One of the first music video shot in stereoscopic 3D. It shows Björk, in an ancient Mongolian tribal costume, amongst a group of yaks. Throughout the video, a clay demon, dubbed the "painbody" by the directors, comes out of her backpack and tries to attack her. Eventually, they both fall from a waterfall and end in the hands of an entity that was following them before.	Volta	
"The Dull Flame of Desire" Björk featuring Anohni	2008	Christoph Jantos, Masahiro Mogari and Marçal Cuberta Junca	The video includes three different versions, each edited by a runner-up of the "Innocence" video contest. They all show Björk and Anohni singing the song, and in the last part of the video their facial features fuse together.	Volta	

=== 2010s ===
Title	Year	Director(s)	Description	Album	Ref.
"The Comet Song"	2010	Maria Lindberg	The video is made up of parts of the film Moomins and the Comet Chase. The Moomins are seen working in a team and running away from a comet.	—N/a	
"Surrender" Ólöf Arnalds featuring Björk	2010	Arni & Kinski	Ólöf Arnalds sings the song in Iceland's Þingvellir National Park, at points performing choreography with a male partner. Björk does not appear in the video. It was filmed on Super 8.	Innundir skinni	
"Crystalline"	2011	Michel Gondry	Portrays Björk as a sort of moon deity, while various crystals form and are subsequently destroyed on a planet. Various reflections of the singer dancing appear on glass spheres.	Biophilia	
"Moon"	2011	Björk, Inez and Vinoodh, M/M Paris and James Merry	A video shot during the photoshoot for the Biophilia album cover, features the singer performing the song in a dress by Iris van Herpen and seemingly executing the song melody on a harp belt. Various graphics are juxtaposed with the video, including various lunar phases. The graphics were designed by M/M Paris for the Biophilia app.	Biophilia	
"Thunderbolt" (Live)	2011	Thirtytwo (Note: Thirtytwo consists of Will Lovelace and Dylan Southern)	A live video shot during Björk's Biophilia tour residency at Manchester International Festival in July 2011; shows the singer performing the song wearing a dress by Michel van der Ham.	Biophilia	
"Hollow"	2012	Drew Berry	An animated video illustrating the molecular composition of the human body, starting from the blood tissue and showing the DNA as various proteins are sent to the nucleus. At one point in the video a reproduction of Björk's face, made from various proteins, appears among the DNA strings.	Biophilia	
"Mutual Core"	2012	Andrew Thomas Huang	Commissioned and premiered at the MOCA in Los Angeles, portrays Björk on a sand bed, while various rocks revolve around her. At the end of the video, two rocks unite to form a volcano, whose shapes resemble Björk's facial features. One shot of the video was used as the Bastards album cover.	Biophilia	
"Black Lake"	2015	Andrew Thomas Huang	The video was commissioned by the Museum of Modern Art, to be included in the 2015 Björk exhibition. The visuals were created to be part of a sound installation, in which it was shown on two opposite screens. Because of this, multiple versions of the video exist. One version features only the first verse of the song and shows Björk, naked among rocks, while blue fluid comes out of her. The video then portrays the singer as she sings barefoot in a cave. It concludes with Björk singing the song in a field, while her dress dissolves.	Vulnicura	
"Lionsong"	2015	Inez and Vinoodh	Shot during the photoshoot for the Vulnicura album cover, it portrays Björk dancing and showing expressions of anger and happiness. At one point, the singer appears with bronze skin, while purple lights surround her.	Vulnicura	
"Family" (Moving album cover)	2015	Andrew Thomas Huang	The video, used as a promotion for the release of the physical version of Vulnicura, features a shortened version of the song and shows an avatar of Björk, laid on a rock and sewing a wound on her chest. The avatar also features on the deluxe edition cover of Vulnicura.	Vulnicura	
"Stonemilker" (Virtual Reality)	2015	Andrew Thomas Huang	A virtual reality video which portrays Björk singing on a beach and in a field. As the song progresses, Björk multiplies and surrounds the viewer. The video was released as an app, which features a string-laden version of the song.	Vulnicura	
"Mouth Mantra"	2015	Jesse Kanda	Shot partially in a mock-up of the singer's mouth, also contains parts in which Björk is shown dancing in a white dress. A virtual reality version of the video premiered at the Björk Digital exhibition.	Vulnicura	
"Notget" (Virtual Reality)	2016	Warren Du Preez and Nick Thornton Jones	The first version of the video is a virtual reality video which shows an avatar of Björk singing while surrounded by various strings and lights, eventually growing larger. A work-in-progress version of the video premiered at the Björk Digital exhibition in Sydney, while the completed version later won the 2017 Cannes Lion for Digital Craft.	Vulnicura	
"Quicksand" (Virtual Reality)	2016	Dentsu Lab Tokyo	Shot at the Miraikan museum in Tokyo as the first virtual reality live stream on YouTube, it was later premiered at the Björk Digital exhibition in London. The virtual reality video features Björk singing while wearing a mask, created by Neri Oxman, which reproduces her nervous system, while various light effects are added on her.	Vulnicura	
"Family" (Virtual Reality)	2016	Andrew Thomas Huang, Björk, James Merry	Premiered at the Björk Digital exhibition in Montreal, it is a virtual reality interactive video in which the viewer can help an avatar of Björk as she sews back her wound.	Vulnicura	
"Notget"	2017	Warren Du Preez and Nick Thornton Jones	This second visual shows Björk, dressed to resemble a moth, as she sings the song and transforms. The first half of the video is shot in black and white, while during the transformation phase the setting acquires colour.	Vulnicura	
"The Gate"	2017	Andrew Thomas Huang	The video begins with a shot of Björk playing the flute on the edge of a cliff, while several objects levitate nearby. The second part of the video portrays Björk passing a glowing orb to an "all-crystal being". A glow in her chest projects three other figures that start dancing around her. One of them embraces with Björk until the song ends. The video debuted on Nowness. Björk's dress was designed by Gucci and took over 800 hours to craft.	Utopia	
"Blissing Me"	2017	Tim Walker & Emma Dalzell	The video is shot as a one-take of Björk dancing and performing the song. It premiered via Amazon Music UK.	Utopia	
"Utopia"	2017	Warren Du Preez and Nick Thornton Jones	Set on a "pink-hued planet", Björk alternatively plays the flute while surrounded by the flute septet Viibra and colourful animals. The video debuted during the Kimono Roboto exhibition in Tokyo's Omotesando Hills.	Utopia	
"Arisen My Senses"	2017	Jesse Kanda	In the video's first sequence, Björk is in a glowing cocoon nestled next to a giant mouth with two tongues. She is simultaneously singing from her own mouth inside the cocoon and opening her mouth outside it. She then emerges as a moth. Arca makes an appearance in the video. It debuted on WeTransfer alongside a special behind-the-scenes video titled Work in Progress: Björk & Jesse Kanda.	Utopia	
"Tabula Rasa"	2019	Tobias Gremmler	The video portrays Björk's face superimposed with a colourful mass, whose features resemble flowers and mountains. The figure sprouts petals and fronds as it twists and billows through the air. The visual debuted as the backdrop of the song during the Cornucopia residency show at The Shed in New York City.	Utopia	
"Losss"	2019	Tobias Gremmler	Based on "the conversations between our inner optimist and pessimist", it features two opposite versions of Björk's face blooming and collapsing in on themselves. The visual debuted as the backdrop of the song during the Cornucopia residency show at The Shed in New York City.	Utopia	

=== 2020s ===
Title	Year	Director(s)	Description	Album	Ref.
"Atopos"	2022	Viðar Logi	Madison Bloom and Jazz Monroe of Pitchfork described the video as a "party at a mushoom rave" in a "fungal underworld, where a masked Björk, a bass clarinet sextet, and Gabber Modus Operandi's DJ Kasimyn gear up for a rave showdown".	Fossora	
"Ovule"	2022	Nick Knight	In the video, Björk wears two custom dresses designed by Gucci's then creative director Alessandro Michele, constructed from spirals of pleated organza, interspersed with scenes of an avatar of Björk made from 3D scanning as she moves between different states of mind.	Fossora	
"Ancestress"	2022	Andrew Thomas Huang	The video depicts a ritual funeral for Björk's late mother Hildur Rúna Hauksdóttir. Björk leads a group of masked musicians and dancers through the backdrop of a mountain landscape.	Fossora	
"Sorrowful Soil"	2022	Viðar Logi	Björk performs the song alone at the Fagradalsfjall volcano in Iceland. The video is shot by showing the singer through a blurred oval section. Another shortened version of the video, featuring the singer performing the song acoustically was also released.	Fossora	
"Woe (I See It From Your Side)" (Björk Remix) Shygirl featuring Björk	2023	Sam Ibram	The video shot in Tokyo sees Shygirl move through a series of montages which gradually becomes more intense and hallucinatory. Björk does not appear in the video.	Nymph_o	
"Fossora"	2023	Björk, Viðar Logi, M/M Paris and FutureDeluxe	The video sees the singer perform alongside clarinet sextet Murmuri and Kasimyn of Gabber Modus Operandi, against an unfolding backdrop of glistening spores that multiply, grow, and pulsate as the track's intensity reaches its peak.	Fossora	
"Victimhood"	2023	Gabríela Friðriksdóttir and Pierre-Alain Giraud	The video is illustrated with a moving animation of paintings by Friðriksdóttir. Otherworldly animals float around the screen, exploring the natural environment. The video was premiered at the Cornucopia tour stop at the Altice Arena in Lisbon.	Fossora	
"Oral" Björk featuring Rosalía	2023	Carlota Guerrero	In the video, two AI-generated deepfake versions of the singers train together – exploring themes of female rage. In the end, the two engage in a choreographed fight sequence with swords, coming together to fight a bigger enemy.	—N/a	
"Berghain" Rosalía, Björk and Yves Tumor	2025	Nicolás Méndez	Shot in Warsaw, the video follows Rosalía surrounded by an orchestra in different locations including an apartment, a hospital, a bus and a pawn shop. She then returns to her apartment to find the door open, and when she investigates finds that it has been painted like a forest and many animals are inside, including a bird that sings Björk's vocals. The video concludes with Rosalía in bed, cut between distressing dark scenes of the animals morphing and a drum, she then appears to turn into a dove.	Lux	

== Video albums ==
All of Björk's video albums were released by One Little Independent Records.

=== Concert films ===
Title	Production details	Notes	Ref.
Vessel	Director: Stéphane Sednaoui; Released: 5 September 1994; Format: VHS · DVD	Contains the first live long-form video by Björk. The release documents a concert by the artist during the Debut tour. Björk performs ten songs from the album; an interview with the singer is interspersed throughout the setlist.	
Live at Shepherds Bush Empire	Director: David Barnard; Released: 16 November 1998; Format: VHS · DVD	The live show was recorded at the end of the Post tour on 27 February 1997, at a special fan-club only free concert at the Shepherds Bush Empire.	
Live in Cambridge	Director: David Barnard; Released: 26 November 2001; Format: DVD	Contains a live performance by Björk on the Homogenic tour, recorded live at the Corn Exchange in Cambridge, England, on 2 December 1998. It was one of the last of the concerts performed on that tour.	
Live at Royal Opera House	Director: David Barnard; Released: 18 November 2002; Format: DVD	It contains a live performance by Björk on the Vespertine world tour, recorded at the Royal Opera House in London on 16 December 2001. With this concert Björk had become the first ever contemporary pop artist to perform at the venue. It also includes a short behind the scenes documentary which would partly be used on Minuscule.	
The Volta Tour live in Paris and Reykjavík	Directors: Russell Thomas (live in Paris) · Hreinn Beck (live in Reykjavík); Released: 23 June 2009; Format: DVD	It includes two performances from the last leg of the Volta tour in 2008, recorded at the Olympia in Paris, and an acoustic showcase at the Langholtskirkja in Reykjavík. After a limited theatrical run, it was included in Voltaïc and received a promotional standalone release.	
Björk: Biophilia Live	Directors: Nick Fenton · Peter Strickland; Released: 24 November 2014; Format: 2CDs/DVD · 3LPs/DVD · 2CDs/Blu-ray	The film features Björk performing on the Biophilia tour at Alexandra Palace in London. It had a theatrical premiere at the Tribeca Film Festival on 26 April 2014 with screenings across the world throughout the same year.	
Cornucopia	Director: Ísold Uggadóttir; Released: 24 January 2025; Format: streaming	The film chronicles Björk's performance at the Altice Arena in Lisbon, Portugal in 2023, as part of her Cornucopia tour. The movie overlays the performances with the visuals that were projected on the screens on the background of the live setting. A shortened version was premiered on Apple TV+ as part of the Apple Music Live series, with a full length version receiving a theatrical release.	

=== Music videos compilations ===
Title	Production details	Notes	Ref.
Volumen	Released: 30 November 1998; Format: VHS · DVD	It includes all of Björk's videos until "Hunter". It has been certified Gold by the RIAA in the United States. It was re-issued in 2002 as Greatest Hits – Volumen 1993–2003, including all of the singer's music videos up until "It's in Our Hands". It also includes the "Nature Is Ancient" visual, which was used to promote the Family Tree box set.	
Volumen Plus	Released: 2 December 2002; Format: DVD	It was released alongside Greatest Hits – Volumen 1993–2003 and only includes the videos not already available on the previously released Volumen.	
The Medúlla Videos	Released: 30 May 2005; Format: DVD	It includes videos for songs from Medúlla. A total of five music videos are included. A documentary about the making of the "Triumph of a Heart" music video is also included as a bonus feature.	
The Volta Videos	Released: 23 June 2009; Format: DVD	It features videos for songs from Volta. It also includes making-of videos for "Declare Independence" and "Wanderlust" and 9 runner-up visuals from the "Innocence" Video Contest. Included in Voltaïc, it received a promotional standalone release.	
Vulnicura VR	Released: 6 September 2019; Format: software · digital download	It includes all the Vulnicura videos shot in VR technology. Out of these, only "Stonemilker" was already released on YouTube, while "Lionsong", "Black Lake", "Notget" and "Mouth Mantra" were available in 2D, with "Family" and "Quicksand" receiving their first public release. "History of Touches" and "Atom Dance", the only two songs which did not receive a video format, are included as a visual score by Stephen Malinowski. The audio included in the videos is recorded in an ambisonics surround sound format.	

=== Television performances ===
Title	Production details	Notes	Ref.
MTV Unplugged / Live	Released: 9 February 2002; Format: DVD	It features two complete MTV performances: the first show was recorded for MTV Unplugged in 1994 during the promotion of Debut and the second show was recorded for MTV Live in 1998 for the promotion of Homogenic.	
Later with Jools Holland	Released: 23 August 2003; Format: DVD	The DVD contains seven performances of Björk from 1995 to 1997 that have all been recorded on the Later... with Jools Holland television show. It was re-released in 2012 as Later with Jools Holland 1995–2011, including performances from 2007 and 2011 during the promotion of Volta and Biophilia, respectively.	

=== Documentaries ===
Title	Production details	Notes	Ref.
Inside Björk	Director: Christopher Walker; Released: 23 August 2003; Format: DVD	It contains a 2002 documentary outlining the career of Björk. It also features interviews with Sean Penn, Lars von Trier, Thom Yorke, Beck, RZA, Elton John, Missy Elliott, the late Alexander McQueen and more on their thoughts of Björk and her impact on music and culture.	
Minuscule	Director: Ragnheidur Gestsdóttir; Released: 3 November 2003; Format: DVD	It contains a documentary offering a behind-the-scenes look at Björk and her touring entourage for the 2001 Vespertine world tour. It includes interviews with harpist Zeena Parkins, the Inuit choir from Greenland, electronic duo Matmos, and an ongoing conversation with Björk herself about her recordings and her tours. The documentary is interspersed with live footage of songs from the tour shot by Ragnheidur Gestsdóttir.	
The Inner or Deep Part of an Animal or Plant Structure	Director: Ragnheidur Gestsdóttir; Released: 31 August 2004; Format: DVD	It contains a 45-minute film about the making of Medúlla. It features clips of the studio performances by Dokaka, Shlomo, Rahzel and Mike Patton that formed the beats for many of the songs on the album. The title of the video is the actual definition of the word "Medúlla".	
When Björk Met Attenborough	Director: Louise Hooper; Released: 5 May 2014; Format: DVD · Blu-ray	Contains a 2013 documentary television film directed by Louise Hooper. Partly filmed at the Natural History Museum in London, the documentary features an encounter between Björk and English broadcaster and naturalist David Attenborough. They discuss the nature of music and the intersection between music, nature and technology. It also follows the singer as she prepares for her Biophilia tour, along with rehearsal and studio recording.	

=== Box sets ===
Title	Production details	Notes	Ref.
The Live Archive	Released: 9 May 2005; Format: 4DVDs	Includes Vessel, Live at Shepherds Bush Empire, Live in Cambridge and Live at Royal Opera House.	
The Television Archive	Released: 9 May 2005; Format: 5DVDs	Includes MTV Unplugged / Live, Later with Jools Holland, Inside Björk, Minuscule and The Inner or Deep Part of an Animal or Plant Structure.	

== Filmography ==
=== Feature films ===
Title	Year	Role	Notes	Ref.
The Juniper Tree Directed by Nietzchka Keene	1990	Margit		
Dancer in the Dark Directed by Lars von Trier	2000	Selma Ježková	Also composer of the soundtrack Selmasongs	
Drawing Restraint 9 Directed by Matthew Barney	2005	Occidental Guest	Also composer of the soundtrack Drawing Restraint 9	
The Northman Directed by Robert Eggers	2022	The Seeress	Excerpts of her vocals appear on the soundtrack	

=== Television ===
Title	Year	Role	Notes	Ref.
Glerbrot	1987	Maria	Television film	
Top of the Pops	1995	Herself	Guest co-presenter alongside Jack Dee; Episode: "25 December 1995"	
Modern Minimalists	1997	Herself	Björk narrates and interviews musicians including Arvo Pärt and Mika Vainio	
The South Bank Show	1997	Herself	Documentary about her career and the recording of Homogenic	
Space Ghost Coast to Coast	2001	Herself	Episode: "Yorke and Björk in: Knifin' Around"	
Dagvaktin	2008	Herself	Episode: "1.4"	
When Björk Met Attenborough	2013	Herself	Documentary alongside David Attenborough	
Björk!	2015	Herself	An Arte documentary about Björk's career.	

=== Other appearances ===
Title	Year	Role	Notes	Ref.
Rokk í Reykjavík	1982	Herself	Documentary on Icelandic music Performs with the Tappi Tíkarrass	
Nýtt líf	1983	Herself	Icelandic comedy film Performs with the Tappi Tíkarrass	
Prêt-à-Porter	1994	Model	Uncredited cameo in the Robert Altman movie	
The Work of Director Chris Cunningham	2003	Herself	Segment: "Making of All is Full of Love video"	
Arakimentari	2004	Herself	Documentary on Nobuyoshi Araki	
Screaming Masterpiece	2005	Herself	Documentary on Icelandic music Features live performances of "All Is Full of Love" and "Pluto"	
Looking for a Thrill: An Anthology of Inspiration	2005	Herself	Documentary	
The Work of Director Stephane Sednaoui	2005	Herself	Segments: "Making of Big Time Sensuality video", "Making of Possibly Maybe video"	
Matthew Barney: No Restraint	2006	Herself	Documentary on the making of Drawing Restraint 9	
Anna and the Moods	2007	Anna Young	Short film, voice role cameo	
Sleepless Nights Stories	2011	Herself	Appearance in the Jonas Mekas film	
Fungi: The Web of Life	2023	Narrator	Documentary on fungi	
Monk in Pieces	2025	Herself	Interview in a documentary on Meredith Monk	

=== Soundtrack appearances ===
Title	Year	Featured song(s)	Original music	Ref.
Remote Control	1992	"Ó Borg, Mín Borg"; "Takk"	Yes	
The Young Americans	1993	"Opening Titles"; "Leaving London"; "Play Dead"	Yes	
Léon: The Professional	1994	"Venus as a Boy"	No	
Tank Girl	1995	"Army of Me"; "Big Time Sensuality"	No	
Anton	1996	"Nu flyver Anton"	Yes	
Mission: Impossible	1996	"Headphones"	No	
The X-Files	1998	"Hunter" (Radio Edit)	No	
Being John Malkovich	1999	"Amphibian" (Mark Bell Mix); "Amphibian" (Film Mix)	Yes	
The Mod Squad	1999	"Alarm Call" (Radio Mix)	No	
Stigmata	1999	"All Is Full of Love" (Video version)	No	
Memento	2001	"All Is Full of Love" (In Love with Funkstörung Remix)	No	
Gilmore Girls	2002	"Human Behaviour"	No	
Með mann á bakinu	2004	"Með mann á bakinu"	Yes	
Hot Chocolate	2004	"Synchronicity"	Yes	
Screaming Masterpiece	2005	"All Is Full of Love" (Live version); "Pluto" (Live version); "Oceania"	No	
Huldufólk 102	2006	"One Day" (Live version)	No	
To Lee, with Love, Nick	2009	"Trance"	Yes	
Moomins and the Comet Chase	2010	"The Comet Song"	Yes	
Sucker Punch	2011	"Army of Me" (Sucker Punch Remix)	No (Note: The remix of "Army of Me" featured on the soundtrack was created specifically for the movie.)	
Arbitrage	2012	"I See Who You Are"	No	
The Day Iceland Stood Still	2023	"Future Forever"	No	

== See also ==
- Björk discography
- List of songs recorded by Björk
