= The Inner or Deep Part of an Animal or Plant Structure =

Video by Björk
- Released: August 31, 2004
- Genres: Alternative; a cappella; electronica
- Length: 45:00
- Label: One Little Indian
- Director: Ragnheidur Gestsdóttir

Björk chronology
Minuscule (2003)	The Inner or Deep Part of an Animal or Plant Structure (2004)	The Medúlla Videos (2005)

The Inner or Deep Part of an Animal or Plant Structure is an official DVD released by Björk on August 31, 2004. It is a 45-minute film about the making of her fifth studio album Medúlla. The DVD features clips of the studio performances by Dokaka, Shlomo, Rahzel and Mike Patton that formed the beats for many of the songs on the album. It was originally issued as a bonus feature on the multichannel DVD-A of 'Medulla' and then later reissued by itself as a separate disc.

The title of the DVD is the actual definition of the word "medulla". The use of the accent in the album's official title is a play on the Icelandic word "dúlla".

== Songs ==
The tracks listed below are featured either as background music or as part of the documentary:

- "Oceania" (Choral recording, piano version)
- "Who Is It" (Versions as appear on the "Who Is It" single, plus others)
- "Mouth's Cradle" (Cortejo Afro mix, album version)
- "Desired Constellation" (Album version)
- "Where Is the Line" (Choral recording, album version)
- "Pleasure Is All Mine" (Album version)
- "Triumph of a Heart" (Album version)
- "Ancestors" (Tagaq's vocal recording)
- "Miðvikudags" (Album version)
- "Submarine" (Piano version - unreleased)
- "Komið" ("Come") (Remix - unreleased)
- "The Ice Song" (Vocal recording, vocal editing)
