= Max Weisel =

American entrepreneur and artist

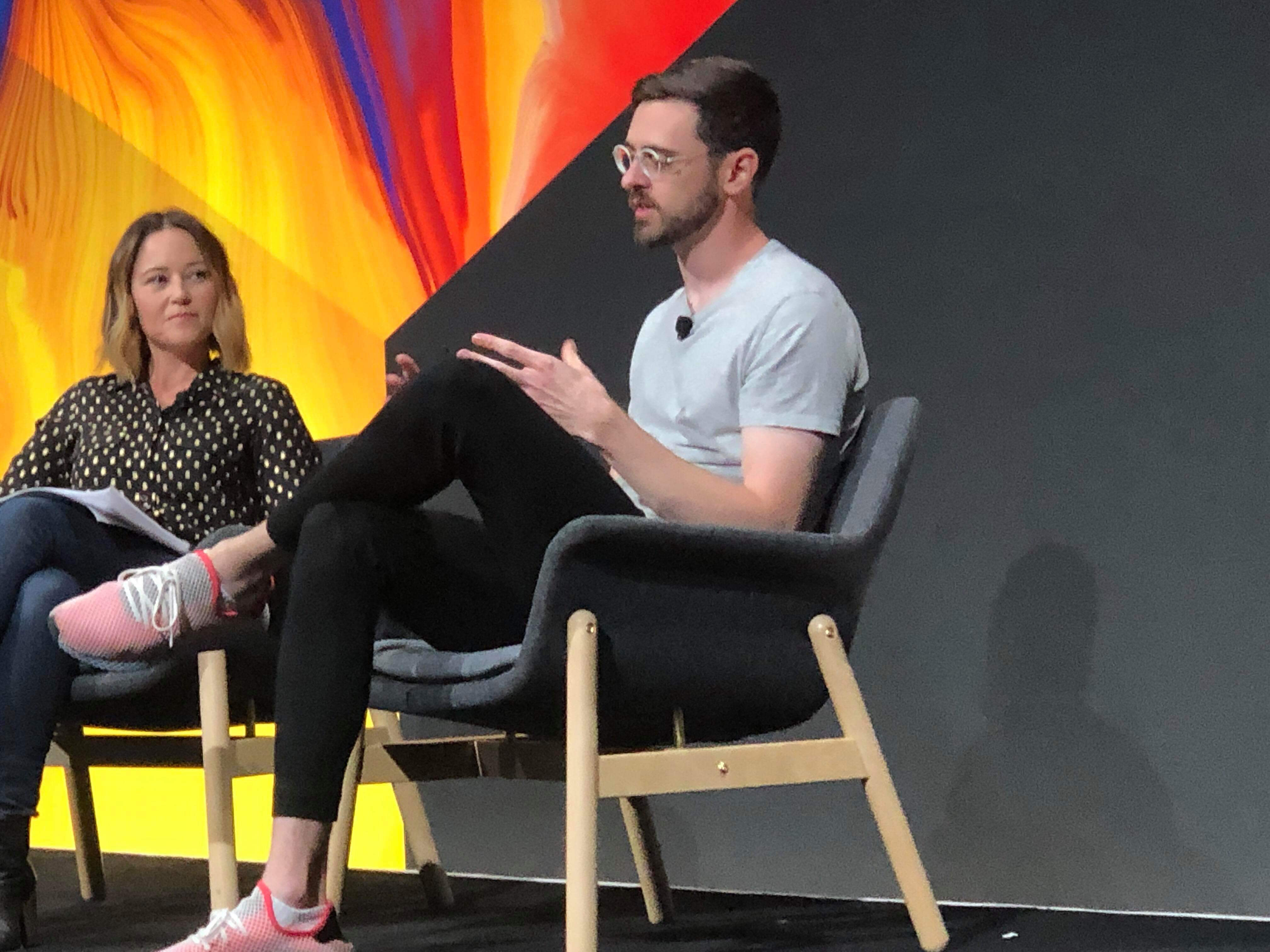
- Weisel in 2019
- Born: November 12, 1991 (age 34); Tucson, Arizona
- Known for: New Media
- Movement: Interactive art, virtual reality, user experience design

Max Weisel (born November 12, 1991, in Tucson, Arizona) is an American entrepreneur and artist. His experience as an iOS app developer predates the release of Apple's App Store. He's collaborated with avant garde artist Björk, to produce Biophilia, the first full-length app album. In addition his work has been featured in museums such as the New York Museum of Modern Art. He is the founder of the San Francisco-based research and development company RelativeWave, which was acquired by Google in 2014. After the acquisition of RelativeWave, Weisel worked as the Head of Material Design Tools at Google until 2016, when he left to found Normal, a virtual reality and augmented reality software company.

== Background and Personal Life ==
Weisel was born in Tucson, Arizona on November 12, 1991. After graduating high school, Weisel attended college in Tucson for a semester before dropping out to establish and run his own tech company. In 2011, Weisel moved to San Francisco. Following the acquisition of RelativeWave by Google, Weisel departed from San Francisco and relocated to New York City. Presently, he resides in New York City, serving as the founder and CEO of Normal.

== Early Projects and iOS Apps ==
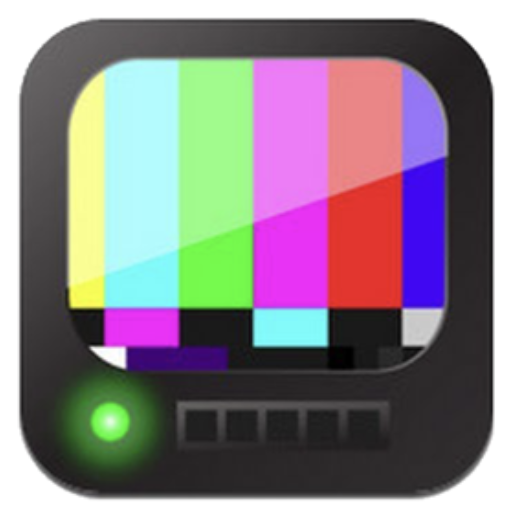
MxTube original app icon

=== Jailbreak community and MxTube ===
In 2008, following the debut of the original iPhone, Weisel began tracking the developments within the early iOS jailbreaking community. He became actively involved in creating some of the initial iPhone applications not developed by Apple. Among his notable creations during this period was MxTube, an application exclusively available on jailbroken iPhones via Installer.app. MxTube allowed users to download videos from YouTube for offline viewing, regardless of their connectivity to Wi-Fi or cellular data networks.

=== MiTube ===
Subsequently, with the introduction of the App Store (iOS), Weisel ported MxTube to Apple's official software development platform, and released the application on the App Store as MiTube, where it quickly became one of the most popular apps at the time, rising to be the seventh most downloaded app on the day of its launch. Apple removed the app from the store shortly at the request of YouTube's parent company, Google.

=== Soundrop ===
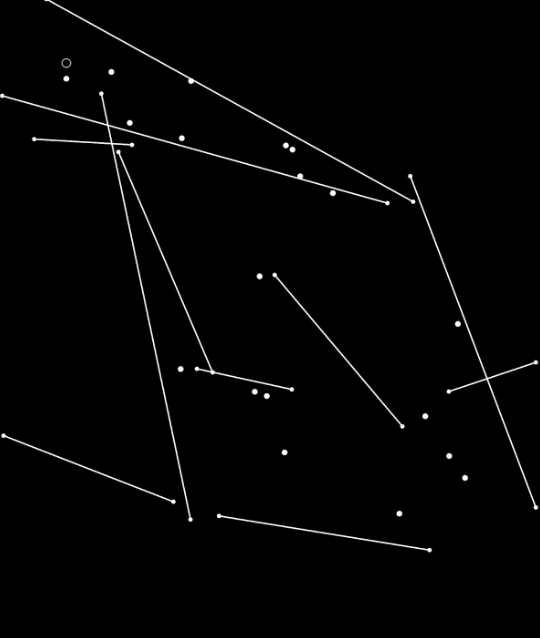
An instance of Soundrop in action

During his time in high school, Weisel developed Soundrop, a recreation of JT Nimoy's Ball Droppings, tailored for iPhone and iPad devices. The user creates sounds by drawing lines, which then interact with falling dots.

From July 24 through November 7, 2011, Soundrop was on display as part of the Museum of Modern Art's Talk to Me exhibition. JT Nimoy, the developer of the original app, expressed appreciation for Weisel's adaptation, noting the addition of new concepts in Soundrop.

The app caught the attention of many in the app development community as well as prominent musicians such as Björk, who contacted Weisel to collaborate on an upcoming project after seeing Soundrop, stating in an interview with Pitchfork that “Soundrop by Max Weisel was the best [app] because it really is a musical instrument. It wasn’t just superficial.”

== Biophilia tour and Björk apps ==
In 2010, he began work on multiple projects for Björk: three "song apps" to be included as part of the release of Björk's official "app album", Biophilia. The album is a first of its kind crossover between mobile applications and mainstream musical releases. The album and associated apps were released in 2011. Weisel also designed and programmed a new musical interface taking advantage of four iPads networked together to create a large touchscreen surface for playing multiple instruments and controlling stage elements for the Biophilia tour show, including a large Tesla coil used as a melodic instrument. Weisel's debut performance with Björk was broadcast on The Colbert Report in February 2012. The iPad interface was integrated into the Biophilia tour, with Weisel performing alongside Björk, where he played as part of the band in her tour appearances from 2012 - 2013. In addition to his work performing on the tour and designing interactive systems for the performances, Weisel also served as the musical director.

=== Biophilia app album and song apps ===
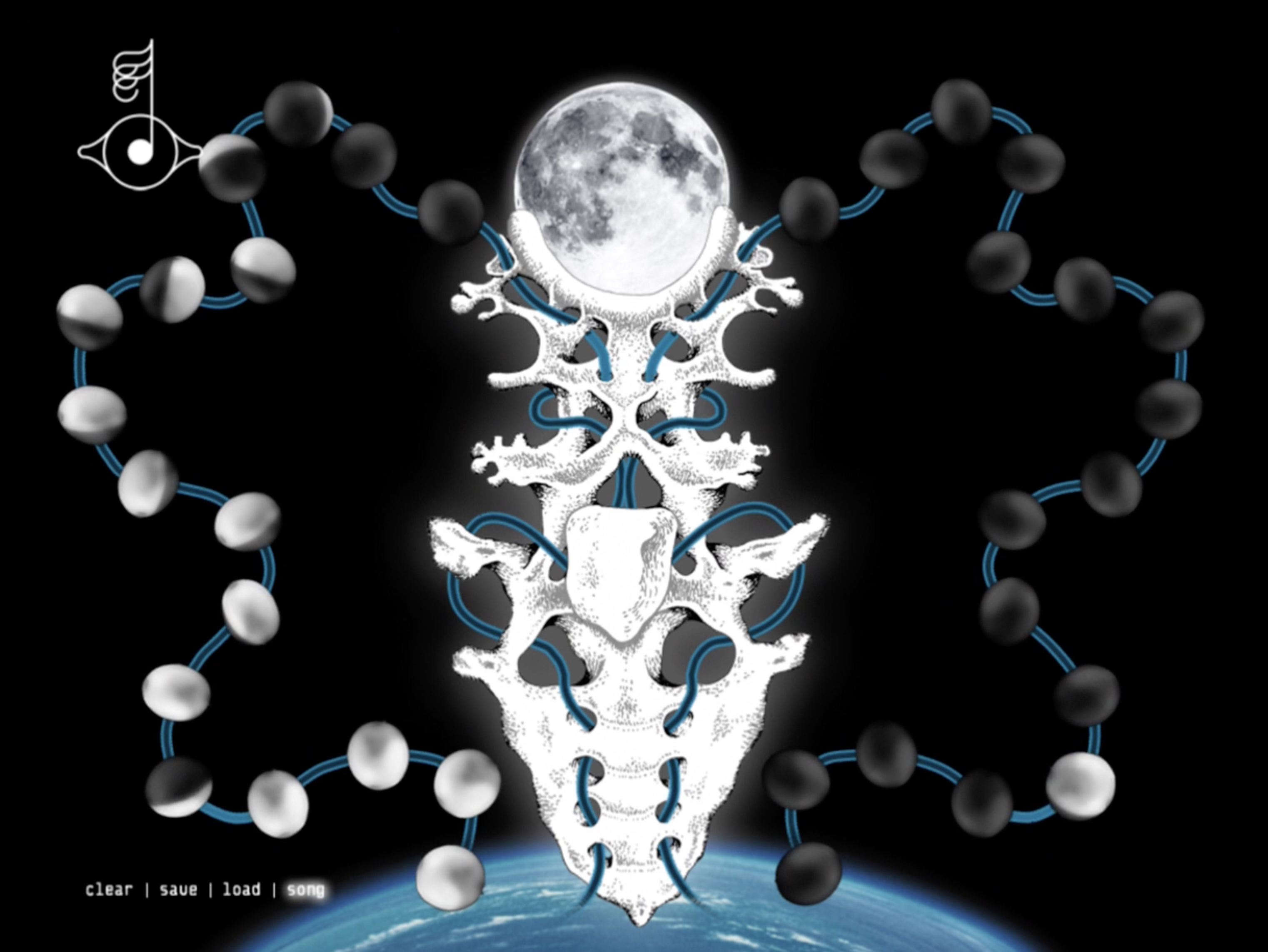
The 'Biophilia' Moon app

As part of a development team commissioned by Björk, Weisel helped to create the Biophilia app, a fully interactive "mother" application which served as the central hub for the individual song apps created by each of the developers commissioned by Björk. Weisel developed three song apps for the project, Moon, Dark Matter, and Solstice.

==== Moon app ====
For the Moon song app, Björk led Weisel to create an app that "connects musical structure, human biorhythms, and cycles of the moon and tides…" The app allows users to play a sequencer-like instrument by playing with 'pearls' that react to the tide of water in the app. The user creates patterns in the water, which changes height based on the tide, creating liquid patterns represented both visually and by the music generated in the app.

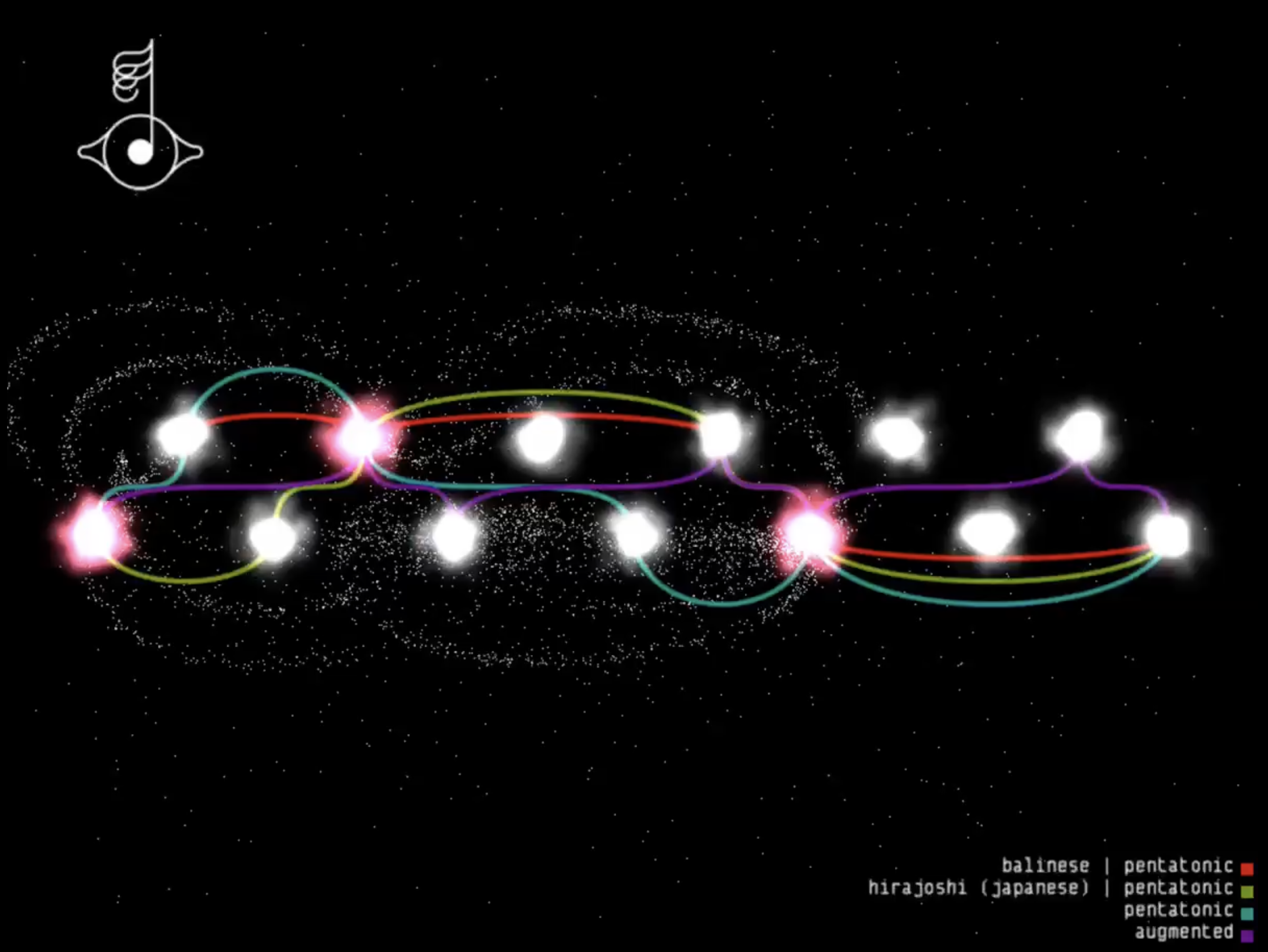
The 'Biophilia' Dark Matter app

==== Dark Matter app ====
The song app for Dark Matter focuses on musical scales, exploring their "relationships in term[s] of magnetism." By taking advantage of various musical modes and scales from different cultures, the user in Dark Matter can create "different colours" by shifting between each scale.

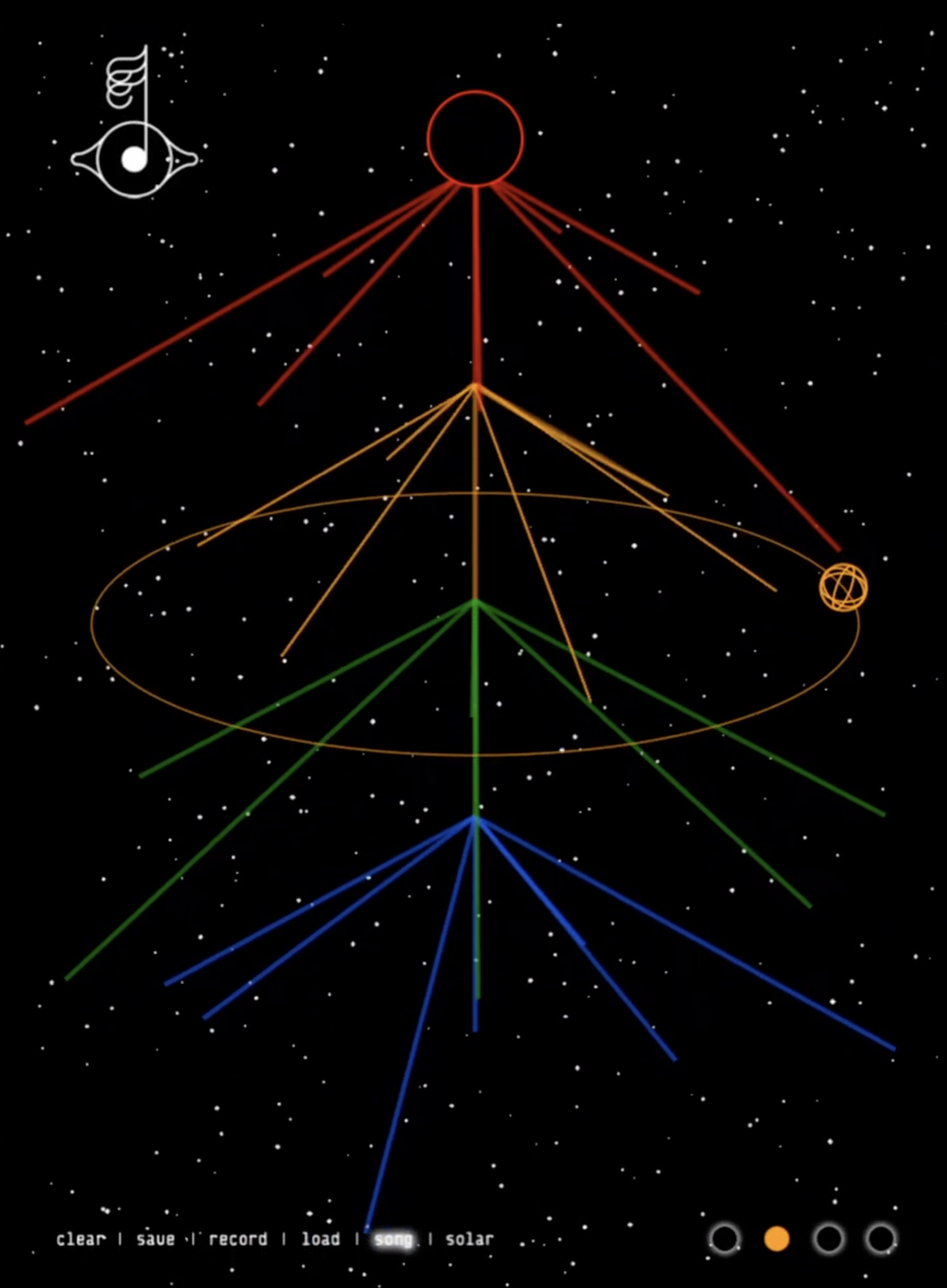
The 'Biophilia' Solstice app

==== Solstice app ====
Represented by 'planets' orbiting a star, with each planet rendered as colored lines, the user controls strings and vocals within the musical arrangement by changing their orbits, speeds and coordinates as they revolve around the central point. The user can then save their "remix" of the track, creating their own unique version of the Solstice song. A special winter-themed version of the Solstice app was developed by Weisel and released separately from Biophilia by Björk in December 2011. The winter app was launched with a reimagined design, trading its solar system interface for a Christmas tree.

=== Induction into MOMA collection ===
Following the success of the Biophilia tour and app releases, the Museum of Modern Art inducted the Biophilia app and corresponding song apps into the permanent collection, making Biophilia the first app entered into the permanent collection. The app's induction was followed by a retrospective installation on Björk, focusing prominently on the recent interactive and app-based album and instruments used on stage in the tour by Weisel and others.

== RelativeWave ==
During Weisel's time touring with Björk, he founded a research and development studio named RelativeWave. The studio focused on researching and prototyping tools for the field of mobile app design.

=== ARTPOP app ===
In 2011, while at a dinner in Chicago, Lady Gaga and Weisel developed an idea for a multimedia creative app to be released alongside her upcoming album, ARTPOP. Like the Biophilia app, the ARTPOP app would serve both as a home for the album and the music itself, but it would also feature multiple interactive elements, allowing the user to the music in a unique and personal way, as well as to create and share their own media, including songs and GIFs, from tools within the app. Development for the app began and continued through 2013, with previews and demos taking place for press and others, but for uncited reasons, development on the app was ceased, and the completed app was never publicly released. Despite the cancellation, Gaga thanked Weisel and the team at RelativeWave in the digital book and physical CD jacket as the official “techhaus”.

=== Form ===
RelativeWave developed and released an interaction design and prototyping software tool called “Form” in 2014. The app was being sold for $150 for a license (later dropped to $80), and utilized a visual programming language that allowed designers to prototype rough designs for apps by connecting nodes together. The app's main function was to help designers envision and work through design challenges and issues before diving into engineering and programming work. In November 2014, Google acquired RelativeWave, gaining ownership of Form in the deal. The team, including Weisel, joined Google to continue supporting and developing the app as an internal tool. Form was made free on the date of the acquisition announcement, and in an unprecedented move, RelativeWave convinced Apple to issue a full refund to everyone who had previously purchased the app on the Mac App Store.

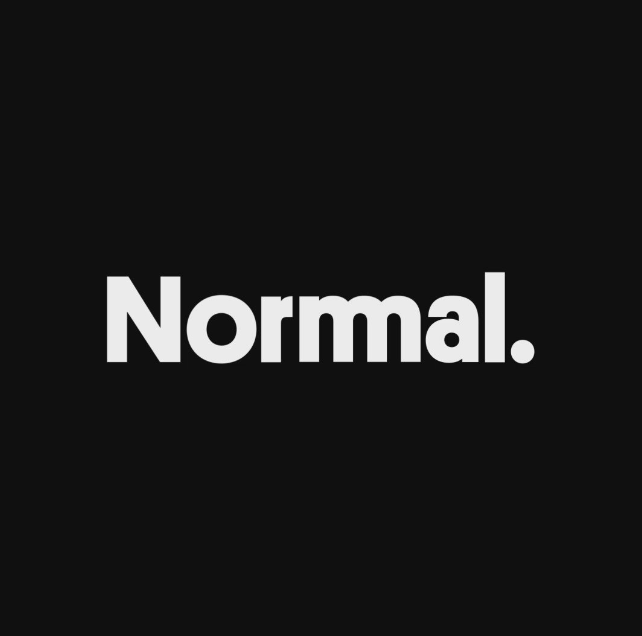
Normal VR official logo

== Normal ==
After the acquisition of RelativeWave by Google, Weisel continued working on Form at Google until late 2015, when he had a chance to preview a virtual reality headset and decided to leave Google and fully devote himself to creating tools and software for VR applications. In January 2016, Weisel founded Normal, a research-led virtual and augmented reality startup.

=== Cutie Keys ===
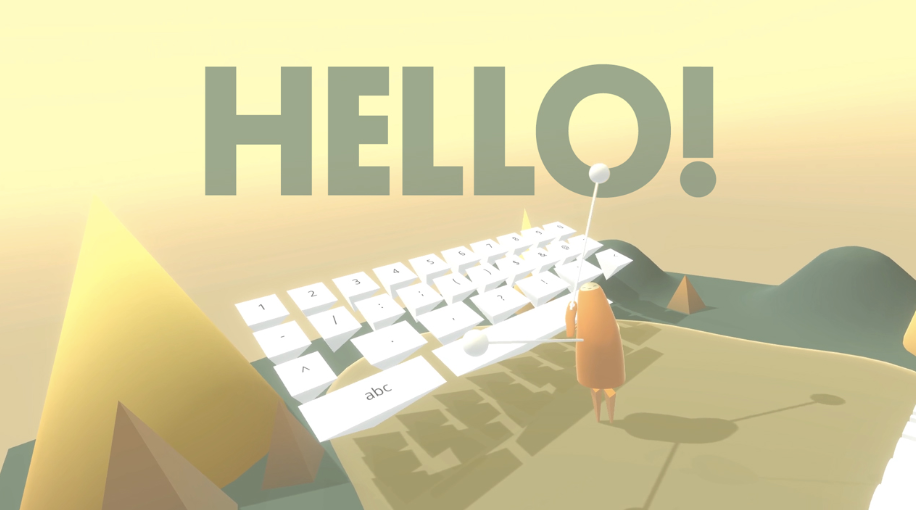
Cutie Keys welcome screen

In February 2017, Normal announced and released a keyboard and typing solution for VR, called ”Cutie Keys”. Inspired in part by a Google I/O demo, Cutie Keys deploys a floating keyboard in front of a user in VR, which they can then type on using virtual “drumsticks” attached to their hand controllers. Normal released Cutie Keys as an open source solution for any developers to use freely in their applications, and modify as desired.

=== Normcore ===
In May 2019, Normal released “Normcore”, a multiplayer plugin for Unity (Game Engine). Noting a lack of universalized resources for multi-user VR and AR experiences and a large overhead required in recreating these resources for every application, Normcore was created to provide a set of fundamental UX and UI implementations, designed specifically for VR and AR, but extendable to any game or application created within Unity.

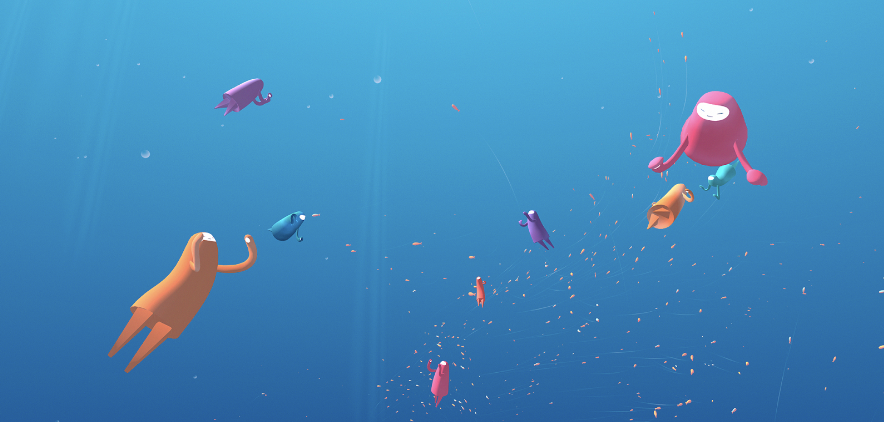
Half + Half's underwater multiplayer space

=== Half + Half ===
In September 2019, Normal continued its work in advanced multiplayer systems with “Half + Half”, an online VR space designed for the Oculus Quest with a focus on creating fun and meaningful connections between players by using real-time voice chat and expressive avatars that communicate through humorous body language, imaginative locomotion and playful interaction with the world around them.

In February 2020, Half + Half was presented at the Brooklyn Academy of Music as a part of Teknopolis, an interactive technology showcase which explores how artists are using virtual and augmented reality, projection mapping, and other tools to create user-centered interactive, multisensory installations.

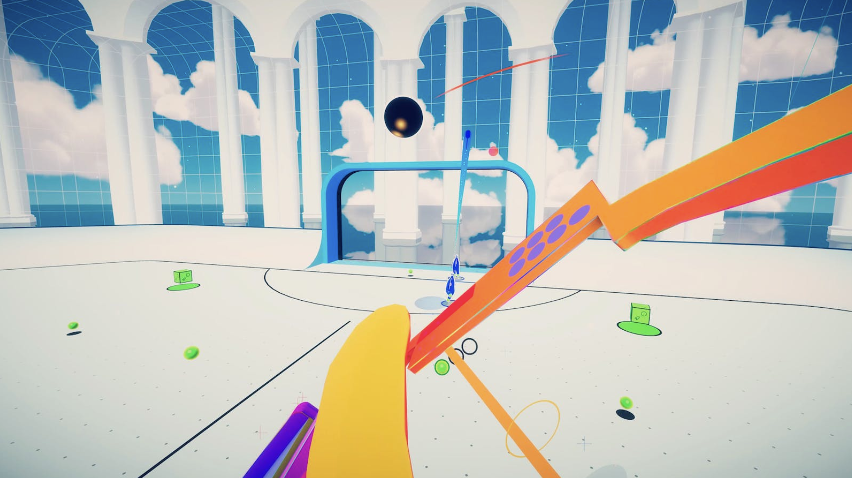
Nock gameplay; moments before scoring

=== Nock ===
In March 2022, Normal released “Nock'', a team-based bow and arrow Esports game for the Quest 2 and Meta Quest Pro. Nock is a self-described “love letter to Rocket League'', another soccer-like multiplayer video game with a futuristic approach to competitive sports, with both games having been described as “easy to play but hard to master”. Nock would go on to land a spot in NPR's “best games of 2022 so far” and in May 2023, became available for the PSVR 2. In July 2023 Nock would also arrive on SteamVR, coinciding with the addition of “Airside Park'', a virtual in-game space for players to meet one another and compete in minigames in between official matches.
