= The Medúlla Videos =

Video by Björk
- Released: 30 May 2005
- Genre: Alternative; a cappella; electronica
- Length: 42:00
- Label: One Little Indian
- Director: Lynn Fox; Dawn Shadforth; Spike Jonze; Gabríela Fridriksdóttir; Ragnheidur Gestsdóttir

Björk chronology
The Inner or Deep Part of an Animal or Plant Structure (2004)	The Medúlla Videos (2005)	Later with Jools Holland 1995–2011 (2012)

The Medúlla Videos is a 2005 music video DVD by Björk. The DVD includes videos for songs from her sixth studio album, Medúlla. A total of five music videos are included, two of which are for songs which were not released as singles, and are exclusive to this DVD release. The video for "Desired Constellation" was used as a backdrop to performances of the song during Björk's 2003 Greatest Hits tour. A documentary about the making of the "Triumph of a Heart" music video is also included as a bonus feature. Partially a mockumentary, the feature focuses on the auditions for the bar patrons who had to be able to make the noises and sound effects required for the live performance in the music video. The sound effects and noises used in the video were edited for a full remix released on the "Triumph of a Heart" CD single, titled the "Audition Mix". It is currently Björk's only DVD which features subtitles.

== Track listing ==
No.	Title	Length
1.	"Oceania"
2.	"Who Is It"
3.	"Triumph of a Heart"
4.	"Desired Constellation"
5.	"Where Is the Line"

Bonus feature
No.	Title	Length
1.	"Triumph of a Heart: Stories Behind the Music Video"
