= Biophilia tour =

2011–13 concert tour by Björk

- Tour by Björk
- Promotional poster for the Zénith concerts
- Associated album: Biophilia
- Start date: 27 June 2011
- End date: 7 September 2013
- No. of shows: 36 in Europe; 23 in North America; 5 in South America; 1 in Africa; 5 in Asia; 70 total

Björk concert chronology
- The Volta tour (2007–08); Biophilia tour (2011–13); Vulnicura tour (2015–17)

The Biophilia tour was the seventh concert tour by Icelandic musician Björk. The tour was centered on her multimedia project and studio album Biophilia (2011). The tour premiered at the Manchester International Festival and visited Europe, Americas, Asia, including her first visit to Taiwan, and featured the first performance in Africa.

The tour schedule featured both a residency format, with a "in-the-round" stage, in which the singer would perform at the same place during different nights, and a conventional stage format for the festival dates. For the tour and the album, the singer conceived a series of new musical instruments, which were controlled on stage by tablets. Björk wore different nature-inspired dresses by Michael van der Ham, Iris van Herpen, Kokon to Zai and Jeremy Scott. The tour was lauded by music critics.

A documentary on the concept and recording of the album, When Björk Met Attenborough, included different partial performances from the tour, while a concert film, called Björk: Biophilia Live, which chronicled the last full Biophilia concert in London, premiered at the 2014 Tribeca Film Festival.

== Background ==
At the end of 2010, Björk confirmed she was working on a new album. In an interview published on Fréttablaðið, the singer stated that the project was midway through the completion and that she hoped to go on tour before the end of 2011. Björk originally conceived the idea for the tour as a house in Iceland where each room would represent a song from the album. When she was contacted from National Geographic they proposed to produce a 3D film from that original idea. Because of that, the singer contacted long time collaborator Michel Gondry and they started to write a script for the movie. Because of the director conflicting schedule with the editing of The Green Hornet, the project was scrapped.

The project was officialised in March 2011, with the announcement of Björk performance at Manchester International Festival. The project, called Biophilia, comprises a series of live performances, a new website, a documentary and a series of apps, besides the release as a music album which is partly composed on an iPad. The Biophilia tour was said to be touring eight cities for three years and to be including a series of workshops for children in collaboration with local schools.

Six performances were planned for the residency in Manchester, with one show being added later and dubbed as a "preview show" on 27 June 2011. In July 2011, Björk was announced as the headliner of Bestival, her only planned outdoor concert of that year. On 8 July 2011, the second residency was announced to be at Harpa in Reykjavík, with six shows planned. The first two shows were also part of Iceland Airwaves. Due to high demand, two more shows were announced, with a last one being announced later. The Icelandic residency went sold out.

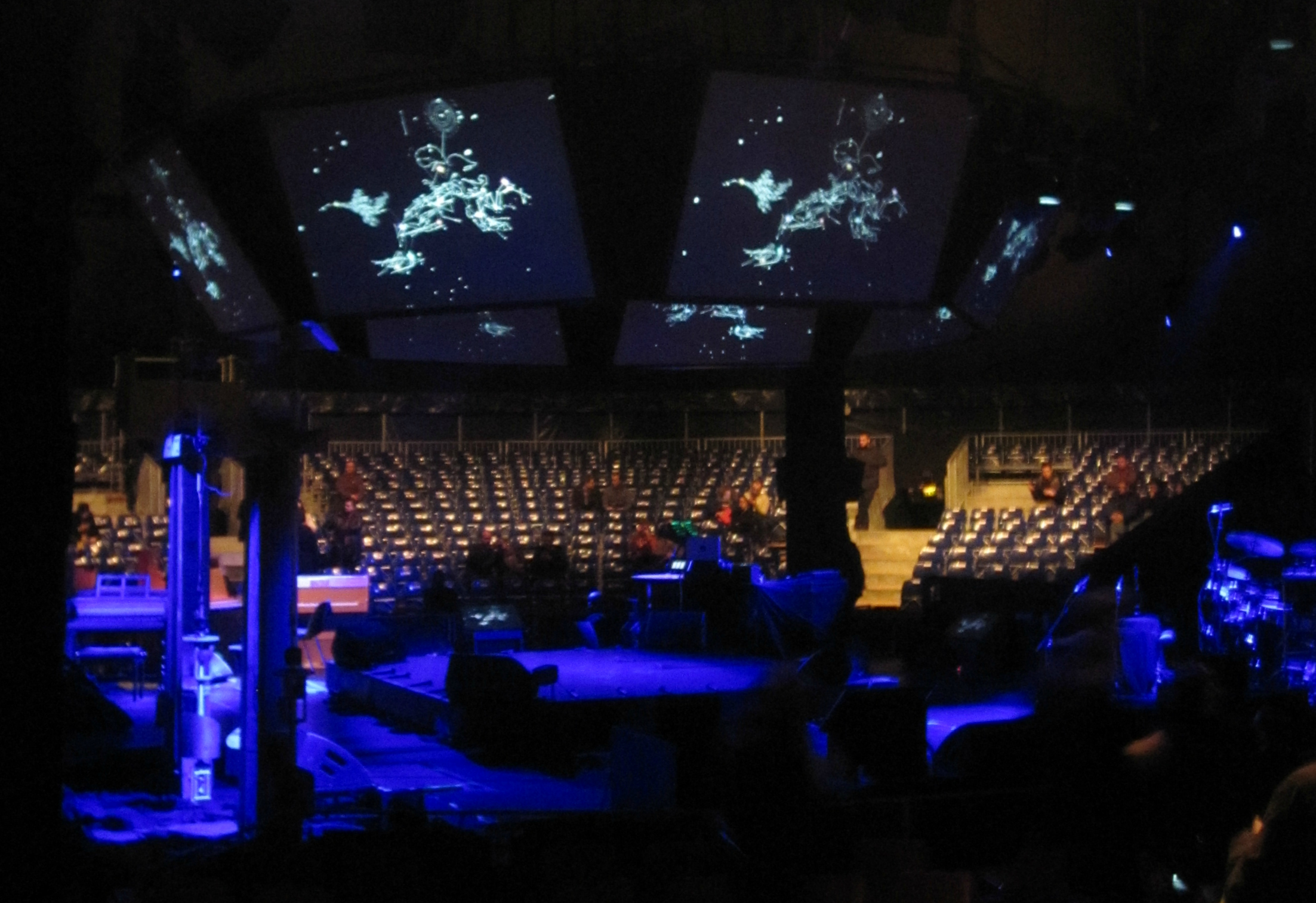
The Biophilia tour featured a 360° "in-the-round" stage, overlooked by eight flat screens which projected nature-related backdrops during the performances.

In the beginning of 2012, the third residency was announced to take place in New York City, in partnership with The Creators Project and the New York Hall of Science, where six of the ten planned gigs were announced to take place, with the other four being at Roseland Ballroom. However, due to an illness, one show that was to take place at the Hall of Science was rescheduled and moved to the Roseland Ballroom. After the end of the residency, another one was announced at Centro de Exposiciones of Buenos Aires, with the last show taking place at the Estadio G.E.B.A. However, due to the discovery of a nodule on her vocal cords, Björk had to cancel the last show at the Centro de Exposiciones and the concert at the Estadio G.E.B.A. For this reason, Björk cancelled several festival appearances she was supposed to have during the summer of 2012. In November 2012, the singer announced that she underwent surgery to remove the nodule.

The tour started again in February 2013, with the fifth residency in Paris, where four concerts took place at the Cirque en Chantier on the Île Seguin and two at the Zénith de Paris. When a fund-raising project appeared on the website for the company Kickstarter, it was stated that the Biophilia tour would visit San Francisco, Los Angeles and Tokyo as the next residencies. The California residency was announced on 1 April 2013, with three dates in Richmond, and three in Los Angeles. Once again, because of ticket requests, another date at the Hollywood Palladium was added. On 21 May 2013, the website of music promoters Smash was updated with details on the last Biophilia residency at the Miraikan museum in Tokyo, with three dates to take place at the end of July and the beginning of August. After an announcement was previewed on Björk's official Facebook page, on 10 June 2013, the last Biophilia concert with the "in round format" was announced at the Alexandra Palace of London.

== Concert synopsis ==
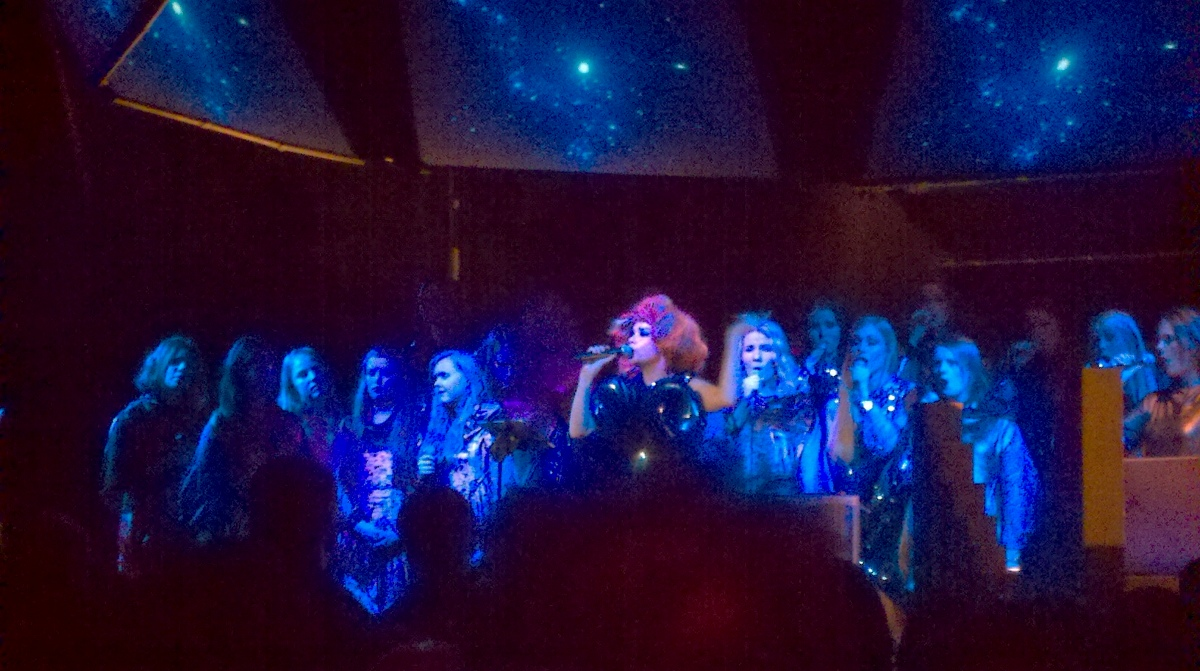
The show, here pictured at the Roseland Ballroom in New York, featured Björk accompanied by an Icelandic choir called Graduale Nobili.

Many instruments were created and brought on stage specifically for the shows: a tesla coil, a bespoke pipe organ that accepts digital information, a pin-barrel harp, a midi-controlled gamelan-celesta hybrid, and a pendulum-harp that harnesses the earth's gravitational pull to create musical patterns. Musicians include Max Weisel (app developer), Matt Robertson (electronics, midi instruments and musical director), Manu Delago (hang drum and percussion), the Icelandic Female Choir and Jón Stefánsson (choir conductor). Jónas Sen (harpsichord, pipe organ and gameleste) also participated in the concerts during the Reykjavík and Paris residencies. Zeena Parkins joined the tour for the North American residencies. Animations by Stephen Malinowski are shown during the performances. A total of 40 songs have been performed.

The show is conceived the following way: the stage is in the middle of the venue with a standing area around it and seats in the background. Björk considered the idea of the circular structure very important since the instruments are set all through the stage and people can flow around it to see all of them. Björk also wanted in to have an intimate, close feeling.

Most of Björk's all-time songs were reworked to fit the aesthetics of the show and were played with the new instruments commissioned exclusively for that purpose. Thus, "Jóga" was played with a pipe organ instead of its characteristical set of strings; "One Day", "Venus as a Boy" and "Possibly Maybe" were played with a hang drum; "You've Been Flirting Again" used a choral arrangement and "Declare Independence", "Pluto", "Possibly Maybe" and "Army of Me" included the performance of a Tesla coil. During the shows in Iceland and Paris, keyboarder Jónas Sen joined to play new versions of "Pleasure is All Mine" on organ and "Vertebrae by Vertebrae" and "Sacrifice" on the harpsichord. Harpist Zeena Parkins joined during the American legs of the tour and also played a reworked version of "Sacrifice" with a harp.

== Broadcasts and recordings ==
Björk's performance of "Thunderbolt" live at Manchester International Festival was released as a music video.

When the Biophilia project was first unveiled, it was announced that a documentary including footage of studio recording, interviews and rehearsal for the live performances, which would culminate in the first live performance at the Manchester International Festival, was in the works. It was also stated that the Manual Edition of Biophilia would include essays by Nikki Dibben, design, drawing and live photography by M/M Paris, additional photography by Inez van Lamsweerde and Vinoodh Matadin, along with a bonus disc of exclusive material. Before the release of the album it was confirmed that the second disc would include a live recording of the Biophilia show in Manchester. The live recording of "Solstice" that was included in this disc is the official version featured in the Biophilia album. After the debut of the residency, the official website of the Manchester International Festival posted footage from the show, including snippets from "Thunderbolt" and "Moon". Another snippet from the latter performance was shown on BBC Scotland. On 3 November 2011, the performance of "Thunderbolt" was released as a music video on Spotify.

While the original idea for the documentary never materialised, the project evolved as a mutual collaboration between David Attenborough and Björk herself. The English naturalist had previously provided the spoken introduction for the live shows and the apps. The documentary, directed by Louise Hooper, explored the relation between men, music and technology and blends with rehearsal footage from the Biophilia tour and snippets from the live show. The forementioned performance of "Thunderbolt" in Manchester is partially included, along with a partial recording of "Cosmogony" live at the 2012 World Sacred Music Festival in Fes. It was narrated by English actress Tilda Swinton and, along with a discussion between Attenborough and Björk, included interventions by British-American neurologist Oliver Sacks. The documentary first aired on Channel 4 on 27 July 2013, as When Björk Met Attenborough. On 21 March 2014, it was announced that the documentary would be released on 5 May 2014, on DVD and Blu-ray.

After Björk dedicated "Declare Independence" to the Pussy Riot, Pitchfork posted a recording from the performance at Flow Festival in Helsinki. When the fifth Biophilia residency was announced in Paris, it was specified that the 27 February 2013, concert at the Cirque en Chantier would be filmed. However, this was not realised. After the start of the residency in San Francisco, an Instagram account which was opened to follow the tour was followed by a three-part video diary of the behind the scenes and rehearsal of the San Francisco shows. The three videos were released on 21 May, 23 May and 25 May 2013, respectively. The Instagram account has posted several short videos of rehearsal and photos from the tour. The 3 September 2013 show at Alexandra Palace in London was recorded. On 26 March 2014, the recording was confirmed to have its worldwide debut at the 2014 Tribeca Film Festival on 26 April 2014. The film, called Björk: Biophilia Live was directed by Peter Strickland and Nick Fenton. On 24 November 2014, the film was released as a video and live album in physical formats, and included a short documentary called "Biophilia at Miraikan", shot at the museum in Tokyo.

== Opening acts ==
- Leila Arab (Zénith de Paris concerts)
- These New Puritans (Hollywood Bowl concert)
- Death Grips (Echo Beach concert)
- Mykki Blanco (Echo Beach concert)

== Set list ==
=== In-the-round shows ===
This set list is from the 3 September 2013 concert in London, England. It is not intended to represent all concerts for the tour.

Introduction from David Attenborough

1. "Oskasteinn" (performed by Graduale Nobili)
2. "Thunderbolt"
3. "Moon"
4. "Crystalline"
5. "Hollow"
6. "Dark Matter"
7. "Hidden Place"
8. "Mouth's Cradle"
9. "Isobel"
10. "Virus"
11. "Sonnets/Unrealities XI"
12. "Possibly Maybe"
13. "Where Is the Line" (Note: Performed with Mike Patton on 28 May 2013)
14. "Mutual Core"
15. "Cosmogony"
16. "Solstice"

Encore

17. "Sacrifice"
18. "One Day"
19. "Náttúra"
20. "Declare Independence"

=== Festival shows ===
This set list is from the 27 July 2013 concert in Yuzawa, Japan. It is not intended to represent all concerts for the tour.

1. "Cosmogony" (contains elements of "Arc Descents")
2. "Hunter"
3. "Thunderbolt"
4. "Moon"
5. "Crystalline"
6. "Hollow"
7. "Hidden Place"
8. "Heirloom"
9. "One Day"
10. "Jóga"
11. "Pagan Poetry"
12. "Army of Me"
13. "Mutual Core"
14. "Hyperballad" (contains elements of "Freak" by LFO)
15. "Pluto"
16. "Náttúra"

Encore

17. "Oskasteinn" (performed by Graduale Nobili)
18. "Declare Independence"

=== Other songs performed ===
Björk rehearsed different songs from her discography for the tour and changed set list order for every show. These songs are not included in the set lists reported above.

- "It's Not Up to You"
- "All Is Full of Love"
- "Unravel"
- "Vertebræ by Vertebræ"
- "Pleasure Is All Mine"
- "Unison"
- "Who Is It"
- "Venus as a Boy"
- "Generous Palmstroke"
- "You've Been Flirting Again"
- "Undo"
- "Bachelorette"
- "Immature"

== Tour dates ==
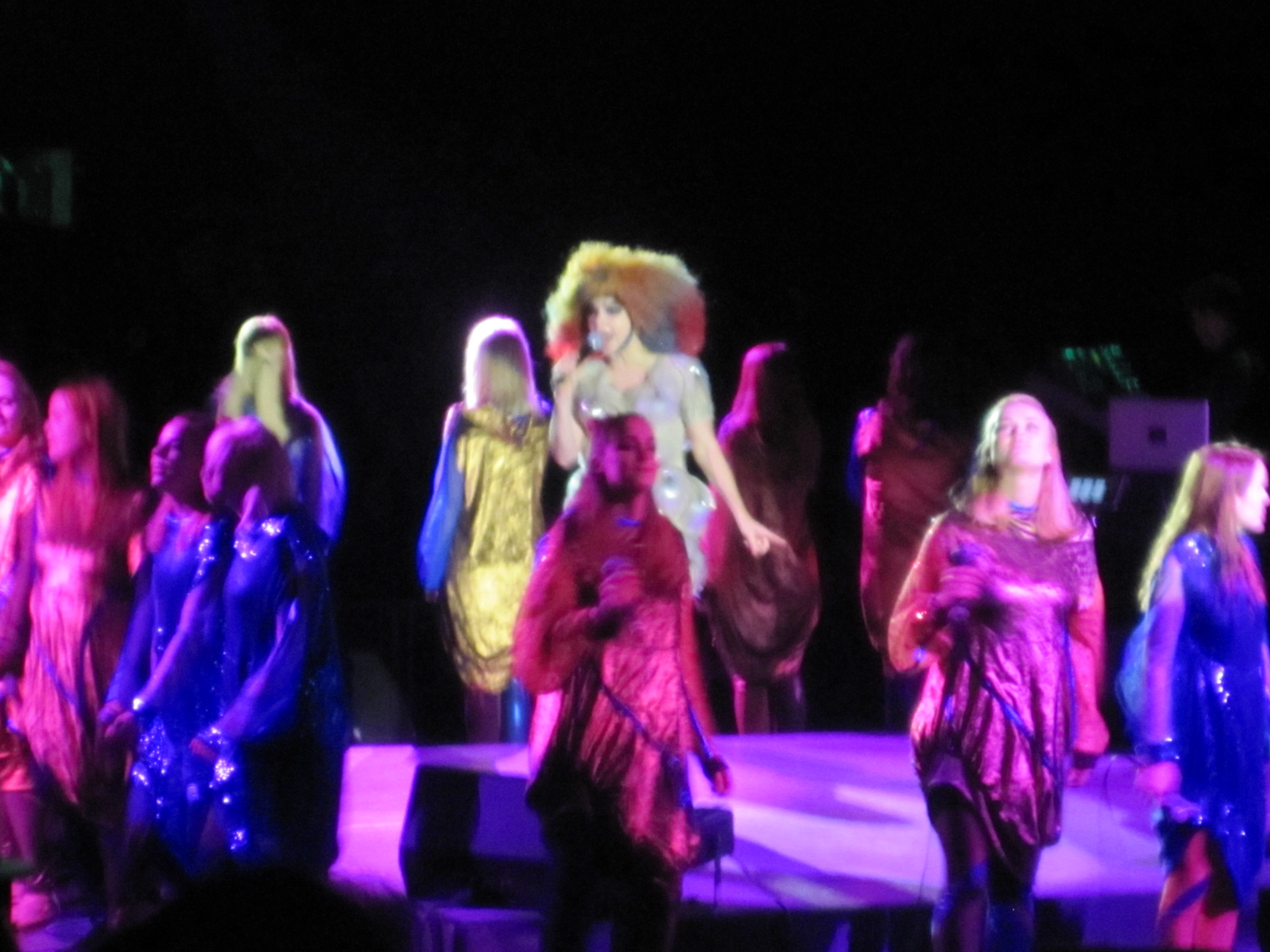
Björk performing "Isobel" live at the Cirque en Chantier on February 24, 2013.

List of 2011 concerts
Date (2011)	City	Country	Venue
27 June^{[A]}	Manchester	England	Campfield Market Hall
30 June^{[B]}	Manchester	England	Campfield Market Hall
3 July^{[B]}	Manchester	England	Campfield Market Hall
7 July^{[B]}	Manchester	England	Campfield Market Hall
10 July^{[B]}	Manchester	England	Campfield Market Hall
13 July^{[B]}	Manchester	England	Campfield Market Hall
16 July^{[B]}	Manchester	England	Campfield Market Hall
11 September^{[C]}	Isle of Wight	England	Robin Hill Park
12 October^{[D]}	Reykjavík	Iceland	Harpa (Silfurberg hall)
16 October^{[D]}	Reykjavík	Iceland	Harpa (Silfurberg hall)
19 October	Reykjavík	Iceland	Harpa (Silfurberg hall)
22 October	Reykjavík	Iceland	Harpa (Silfurberg hall)
25 October	Reykjavík	Iceland	Harpa (Silfurberg hall)
28 October	Reykjavík	Iceland	Harpa (Silfurberg hall)
31 October	Reykjavík	Iceland	Harpa (Silfurberg hall)
3 November	Reykjavík	Iceland	Harpa (Silfurberg hall)
7 November	Reykjavík	Iceland	Harpa (Eldborg hall)

List of 2012 concerts
Date (2012)	City	Country	Venue
3 February	New York	United States	New York Hall of Science
6 February	New York	United States	New York Hall of Science
12 February	New York	United States	New York Hall of Science
15 February	New York	United States	New York Hall of Science
18 February	New York	United States	New York Hall of Science
22 February	New York	United States	Roseland Ballroom
25 February	New York	United States	Roseland Ballroom
28 February	New York	United States	Roseland Ballroom
2 March	New York	United States	Roseland Ballroom
5 March	New York	United States	Roseland Ballroom
21 March^{[E]}	Papantla	Mexico	Takilhsukut Park
24 March^{[F]}	Alajuela	Costa Rica	Autódromo La Guácima
31 March^{[G]}	Santiago	Chile	O'Higgins Park
6 April	Buenos Aires	Argentina	Centro de Exposiciones
9 April	Buenos Aires	Argentina	Centro de Exposiciones
12 April	Buenos Aires	Argentina	Centro de Exposiciones
15 April	Buenos Aires	Argentina	Centro de Exposiciones
15 June^{[H]}	Fes	Morocco	Bab Al Makina
22 June	Santiago de Compostela	Spain	City of Culture of Galicia
27 June^{[I]}	Nîmes	France	Arena of Nîmes
30 June^{[J]}	Lyon	France	Ancient Theatre of Fourvière
4 July^{[K]}	Gdynia	Poland	Babie Doły Airport
8 July^{[L]}	Roskilde	Denmark	Festivalpladsen
5 August^{[M]}	Stockholm	Sweden	Skeppsholmen
9 August^{[N]}	Oslo	Norway	Middelalderparken
12 August^{[O]}	Helsinki	Finland	Suvilahti
16 August^{[P]}	Kiewit	Belgium	Kempische Steenweg

List of 2013 concerts
Date (2013)	City	Country	Venue
21 February	Paris	France	Le Cirque en Chantier
24 February	Paris	France	Le Cirque en Chantier
27 February	Paris	France	Le Cirque en Chantier
2 March	Paris	France	Le Cirque en Chantier
5 March	Paris	France	Zénith de Paris
8 March	Paris	France	Zénith de Paris
11 March^{[Q]}	Crans-Montana	Switzerland	Le Régent
22 May	Richmond	United States	Craneway Pavilion
25 May	Richmond	United States	Craneway Pavilion
28 May	Richmond	United States	Craneway Pavilion
2 June	Los Angeles	United States	Hollywood Palladium
5 June	Los Angeles	United States	Hollywood Palladium
8 June	Los Angeles	United States	Hollywood Palladium
11 June	Los Angeles	United States	Hollywood Bowl
15 June^{[R]}	Manchester	United States	Great Stage Park
13 July^{[S]}	Ottawa	Canada	LeBreton Flats
16 July	Toronto	Canada	Echo Beach
19 July^{[T]}	Chicago	United States	Union Park
27 July^{[U]}	Yuzawa	Japan	Naeba Ski Resort
31 July	Tokyo	Japan	Miraikan
3 August	Tokyo	Japan	Miraikan
6 August	Tokyo	Japan	Miraikan
10 August^{[V]}	Taipei	Taiwan	TWTC Nangang Exhibition Hall
31 August^{[W]}	Stradbally	Ireland	Stradbally Hall
3 September	London	England	Alexandra Palace
7 September^{[X]}	Berlin	Germany	Berlin Tempelhof Airport

=== Festivals performances ===
^{A} This show was billed as a dress rehearsal
^{B} These concerts were part of Manchester International Festival
^{C} This concert was a part of Bestival
^{D} These concerts were part of Iceland Airwaves
^{E} This concert was a part of Cumbre Tajín
^{F} This concert was a part of Festival Imperial
^{G} This concert was a part of Lollapalooza Chile
^{H} This concert was a part of World Sacred Music Festival
^{I} This concert was a part of Nîmes Festival
^{J} This concert was a part of Nuits de Fourvière
^{K} This concert was a part of Open'er Festival
^{L} This concert was a part of Roskilde Festival
^{M} This concert was a part of Stockholm Music & Arts Festival
^{N} This concert was a part of Øyafestivalen
^{O} This concert was a part of Flow Festival
^{P} This concert was a part of Pukkelpop
^{Q} This concert was a part of Caprices Festival
^{R} This concert was a part of Bonnaroo Music Festival
^{S} This concert was a part of Ottawa Bluesfest
^{T} This concert was a part of Pitchfork Music Festival
^{U} This concert was a part of Fuji Rock Festival
^{V} This concert was a part of Twinkle Rock Festival
^{W} This concert was a part of Electric Picnic
^{X} This concert was a part of Berlin Festival

=== Cancellations and rescheduled shows ===
9 February 2012	New York, United States	New York Hall of Science	Postponed for health issues. Rescheduled for 5 March 2012 and moved to Roseland Ballroom
18 April 2012	Buenos Aires, Argentina	Centro de Exposiciones	Canceled for vocal issues.
21 April 2012	Buenos Aires, Argentina	Estadio G.E.B.A.	Canceled for vocal issues.
11 May 2012	São Paulo, Brazil	Sónar Festival	Canceled for vocal issues.
2 June 2012	Barcelona, Spain	San Miguel Primavera Sound	Canceled for vocal issues.
9 June 2012	Porto, Portugal	Optimus Primavera Sound	Canceled for vocal issues.
12 July 2012	Zamárdi, Hungary	Balaton Sound	Canceled for vocal issues.
14 July 2012	Ostrava, Czech Republic	Colours of Ostrava	Canceled for vocal issues.
21 July 2012	Moscow, Russia	Afisha Picnic	Canceled for vocal issues.

== Awards and nominations ==
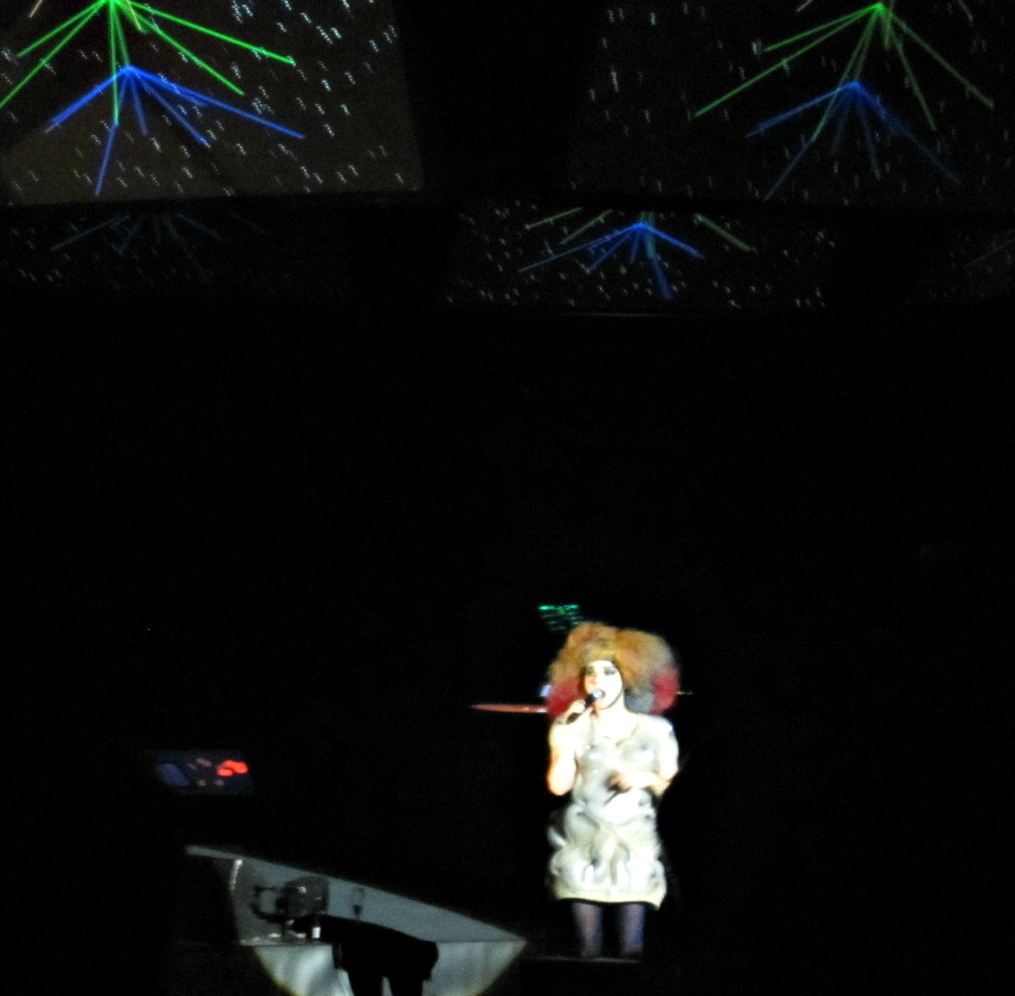
Björk performing "Solstice" during the tour.

=== Icelandic Music Awards ===
Year	Nominee / work	Award	Result	Ref.
2011	Biophilia Tour live at Harpa	Musical Event of the Year	Won	

=== Lunas del Auditorio ===
Year	Nominee / work	Award	Result	Ref.
2012	Biophilia Tour live at Cumbre Tajín	Alternative Performance	Nominated	

== Personnel ==
All credits adapted from Biophilia: Live tour book

- Björk – concept, production, creative lead, musical director, arrangements
- David Attenborough – narration
- James Merry – project coordinator and research

=== Band ===
- Matt Robertson – musical director, midi instruments and choir arrangement (2011 and 2013 shows)
- Manu Delago – hang and percussion
- Damian Taylor – musical direction
- Henry Dagg – sharpsichord (Manchester and London shows)
- Jónas Sen – keyboards, harpsichord (Reykjavík and Paris shows)
- Max Weisel – musical director, midi instruments (2012 shows)
- Zeena Parkins – harp (New York City, San Francisco and Los Angeles shows)

Choir: Graduale Nobili:

- Arnheiður Eiríksdóttir
- Auður Albertsdóttir
- Ásdís Björg Gestsdóttir
- Ásdís Eva Ólafsdóttir
- Ásta Ægisdóttir
- Bergljót Rafnar Karlsdóttir
- Drífa Örvarsdóttir
- Elín Edda Sigurðardóttir
- Erla María Markúsdóttir
- Erla Rún Guðmundsdóttir
- Ester Auðunsdóttir
- Eygló Höskuldsdóttir Viborg
- Fífa Jónsdóttir
- Fjóla Anna Jónsdóttir
- Gígja Gylfadóttir
- Gígja Haraldsdóttir
- Guðrún M Sigurbergsdóttir
- Harpa Björnsdóttir
- Jóna G Kolbrúnardóttir
- Kristín Anna Guðmundsdóttir
- Kristín Einarsdóttir Mäntylä
- Kristín Sveinsdóttir
- Sigrún Ósk Jóhannesdóttir
- Sigurborg Skúladóttir Kaldal
- Unnur Sigurðardóttir
- Vigdís Sigurðardóttir
- Jón Stefánsson – choir conductor
- Andri Steinn Snæbjornsson – choir assisted by

=== Stage, audio and technical ===
- Dave Bracey – front of house sound engineer
- Finnur Ragnarsson – monitor sound engineer
- Paul Eastman – midi technician
- Jez Webb – backline technician
- Ryan Wistort – pendulum technician
- Rob Priddle – audio technician
- Don Parks – audio technician
- Ben Vickets – audio technician
- Richard Cook – audio technician
- Paul Normandale – concert lighting design
- Emma Westerberg – lighting operator
- Snibbe Interactive – video content
- Christine Ockenden – projectionist
- Andy Rhymes – video programmer
- Lucy Ockenden – video programmer
- John Ginley – lighting project manager
- Mick Stowe – lighting technician
- Chris Cooper – lighting technician
- Peter van der Velde – production manager, venue and show design
- Shaun Martin – tour manager

Instruments production

- Björgvin Tómasson – gameleste, pipe organ
- Matt Nolan – gameleste
- Andy Cavatorta – gravity harp
- Henry Dagg – sharpsichord
- PANArt – hang
- Aron Koscho – Singing Tesla coil
- Sergi Jordà, Marcos Alonso, Martin Kaltenbrunner and Günter Geiger – reactable
