= Minuscule (video) =

Video by Björk
- Released: November 3, 2003
- Genre: Alternative
- Length: 70:44
- Label: One Little Indian
- Director: Ragnheidur Gestsdóttir

Björk chronology
Later with Jools Holland (2003)	Minuscule (2003)	The Inner or Deep Part of an Animal or Plant Structure (2004)

Minuscule is an official DVD released by Björk on November 3, 2003. The DVD contains a documentary offering a behind-the-scenes look at Björk and her touring entourage for the 2001 Vespertine world tour. It includes interviews with harpist Zeena Parkins, the Inuit choir from Greenland, electronic duo Matmos, and an ongoing conversation with Björk herself about her recordings and her tours. The documentary is interspersed with live footage of songs from the tour shot by Ragnheidur Gestsdóttir, which themselves correspond to the performances chosen for the Vespertine Live album. A work-in-progress version of this documentary is to be found as a bonus feature on the Live at Royal Opera House DVD, which includes some material that is not included on Minuscule, such as the short interviews with composer Simon Lee.

== Track listing ==
No.	Title	Length
1.	"Prologue"	6:02
2.	"Preparing"	27:34
3.	"Performing"	12:19
4.	"Touring"	9:07
5.	"Epilogue"	15:39

=== Songs ===
The following partial live performances are featured, which correspond to the live tracks chosen for Vespertine Live.

1. "All Is Full of Love"
2. "An Echo, a Stain"
3. "Generous Palmstroke"
4. "Aurora"
5. "It's Not Up to You"
6. "Cocoon"
7. "Unison"
8. "It's in Our Hands"
