= Inside Björk =

2003 video by Björk

Video by Björk
- Released: 23 August 2003
- Genre: Alternative
- Length: 42:00
- Label: One Little Indian

Björk chronology
Greatest Hits – Volumen 1993–2003 (2002)	Inside Björk (2003)	Later with Jools Holland (2003)

Inside Björk is a DVD released by Björk on 23 August 2003. The DVD contains a documentary outlining the career of Björk, from her early work in Icelandic bands, through joining The Sugarcubes, to her solo work up to 2002. The documentary gives viewers a personal view into her private thoughts, views and motivations. Inside Björk also features interviews with Sean Penn, Lars von Trier, Thom Yorke, Beck, RZA, Elton John, Missy Elliott, Alexander McQueen and more on their thoughts of Björk and her impact on music and culture. The documentary coincided with the release of the Greatest Hits album, and had previously been seen on some television networks at the end of 2002. It was commissioned by One Little Indian to make up for the fact that Björk was beginning to do fewer interviews than she had previously. Two small new live performances are included in the documentary, "Generous Palmstroke" performed with Zeena Parkins and an organ version of "The Anchor Song" played in an Icelandic church.

== Track listing ==
No.	Title	Length
1.	"Introduction (Human Behaviour)"	4:22
2.	"Iceberg Lagoon (It's Not Up to You)"	5:25
3.	"Reykjavík Childhood"	4:32
4.	"First Album"	3:00
5.	"Early Bands"	3:44
6.	"Punk and Surrealism"	5:20
7.	"The Sugarcubes (Birthday)"	3:58
8.	"808 State"	2:12
9.	"Church Organ (The Anchor Song)"	3:12
10.	"About Debut"	5:10
11.	"Big Time Sensuality"	4:00
12.	"Violently Happy"	5:02
13.	"Venus as a Boy"	4:40
14.	"Musical Characters and Song Stories"	4:21
15.	"Isobel"	5:50
16.	"Sonic Experiments (Enjoy)"	3:55
17.	"Image"	1:21
18.	"Homogenic"	3:36
19.	"Bachelorette"	5:17
20.	"Jóga"	5:10
21.	"Beats"	2:55
22.	"Pluto"	3:20
23.	"Nature"	2:35
24.	"Hunter"	4:13
25.	"Classical Influences"	3:01
26.	"Musicals"	4:41
27.	"About Dancer in the Dark"	5:08
28.	"About Vespertine"	7:56
29.	"Microbeats and Matmos"	3:14
30.	"Arctic Passion (Aurora, Pagan Poetry)"	6:07
31.	"Generous Palmstroke"	4:08
32.	"Credits"	1:41
