= Later with Jools Holland (Björk video) =

Video by Björk
- Released: August 23, 2003; June 18, 2012 (reissue)
- Genres: Alternative; electronic
- Length: 31:44
- Label: One Little Indian
- Director: Various

Björk chronology
Inside Björk (2003)	Later with Jools Holland (2003)	Minuscule (2003)
The Medúlla Videos (2005)	Later with Jools Holland 1995–2011 (2012)	When Björk Met Attenborough (2014)

Later with Jools Holland is an official DVD released by Björk on August 23, 2003. The DVD contains seven performances by Björk from 1995 to 1997 recorded on the British television show Later... with Jools Holland. All performances featured on the DVD are re-worked from the original album versions; for "Hyperballad" she is accompanied by electra strings; "Venus as a Boy" with Guy Sigsworth on harpsichord; "Possibly Maybe" with a full band featuring legendary slide guitarist BJ Cole; "Bachelorette" and "Hunter" with an Icelandic String Octet and Mark Bell, "Jóga" with an Icelandic String Octet and "So Broken" accompanied by world-famous Flamenco guitarist Raimundo Amador. Björk had also performed "Aeroplane" on the show with D'Influence (her first ever live performance as a solo artist) but it is not included on the DVD, although it is erroneously mentioned on the insert track listing. The performance of "Jóga" also appears on another Jools Holland DVD (Later With Jools Holland: Mellow), which was released in 2006. All the performances are of album tracks apart from "So Broken" which is a B-side to the Jóga single.

The Video Album was re-released in 2012 as Later with Jools Holland 1995–2011, including the latter performances from Björk in 2007 and 2011, promoting Volta and Biophilia respectively.

== Track listing ==
All tracks are written by Björk except where otherwise noted.

No.	Title	Writer(s)	Length
1.	"Hyperballad"		5:39
2.	"Venus as a Boy"		2:49
3.	"Possibly Maybe"		5:44
4.	"Bachelorette"	Bjork; Sjón	5:31
5.	"Hunter"		2:23
6.	"Jóga"	Bjork; Sjón	4:41
7.	"So Broken"		4:57

2012 reissue – Added tracks
No.	Title	Writer(s)	Length
8.	"Earth Intruders"	Bjork; Timbaland; Danja	3:57
9.	"The Anchor Song"		2:11
10.	"Declare Independence"	Bjork; Mark Bell	4:59
11.	"Crystalline"		4:56
12.	"Thunderbolt"	Bjork; Oddný Eir Ævarsdóttir	3:10
13.	"Cosmogony"	Bjork; Sjón	4:38
