= Where Is the Line =

Promotional single by Björk

from the album Medúlla
- Length: 4:41
- Label: One Little Indian
- Songwriter: Björk
- Producers: Björk; Mark Bell

"Where Is the Line" is a song recorded by Icelandic singer Björk for her fifth studio album Medúlla. It was written by the singer herself and co-produced with longtime collaborator Mark Bell. The track was originally intended to be released as the album's third commercial single, but its release was cancelled just before Björk released the Drawing Restraint 9 soundtrack, in order to focus all promotional efforts on the film and soundtrack instead. Some promotional white labels vinyls were released around 2005. A music video for the song was made by Icelandic artist Gabríela Friðriksdóttir. Upon the cancellation of the single, the video was used as part of a video installation project by Friðriksdóttir.

== Background and composition ==
"Where Is the Line" features a contribution by beatboxer Rahzel. According to Björk, she e-mailed "Where Is the Line" to British musician Mark Bell, who a year later replied with a little idea for it. She wanted to make an arrangement like the one for "Brennið þið Vitar", an Icelandic choir piece. After she did it, the song "started to scream for a vocal only version. We tried very hard very long and when finally Rahzel came and sang a beat that we had programmed, gave us some noises we edited into it, it finally fell into place in end of April I think it was and I was so happy when I heard the first playthrough of the only vocal version that I silently cried. It felt great, hard tough work but really really worth it". In an interview with Uncut, Björk revealed that she kept hearing "Bohemian Rhapsody" by Queen in her head when I was editing "Where Is the Line" and "Vökuró", another track on Medúlla. She also thought that "they have the same epic playfulness. I don't know if other people will detect the humour, but I think they're both really funny songs. There's something impressive and ridiculous about them". "Where Is the Line" is a dark song in which Björk attacks her younger brother for being greedy and unreliable. In its lyrics, the singer displays some irritation: "I'm elastic for you, but enough is enough".

== Critical reception ==
Today website was positive towards "Where Is the Line", and said that "it was no coincidence" that one of "the most exciting tracks" on the album contained more percussion and instrumentation than the others. Theon Weber from Spin magazine said the song "assault[s] the listener with a hail of vocal gunfire".

Heather Phares of AllMusic commented that the track was one of Björk's "tough, no-nonsense songs", and "Rahzel's hard-hitting beats make it starker than anything on Homogenic".

== Music video ==
The music video for "Where Is the Line" was directed by Icelandic artist Gabríela Friðriksdóttir and shot at a stable in Iceland, in November 2004. It was premiered during Friðriksdóttir's exposition at the Venice Biennale in 2005. Originally being one of three films from the artist's Versations Tetralogia, then edited to fit "Where Is The Line". It shows Björk wearing a dress made of sandbags and standing in a barn full of hay. She gives birth to a convulsing person (dancer Erna Ómarsdóttir) covered in a white stickiness (Note: The substance resembles vernix caseosa.) who, after a wild dance, withdraws back inside the host. After a series of explosions, a number of creatures made of hay emerge from the hay stacks. They surround her and cover her with their bodies on the ground until she is no longer visible. The video was included on the DVD The Medúlla Videos, which included all music videos from Medúlla, released in 2005.

== Live performances ==
Björk premiered "Where Is the Line" on the Greatest Hits tour in 2003, along with other three tracks from Medúlla. The song has also been performed on the Volta tour in 2007 and 2008. Additionally, "Where Is the Line" was performed along with musician Mike Patton, best known as the lead singer of the alternative metal band Faith No More, on the Biophilia tour on 28 May 2013, in San Francisco. The song was also added to the setlist of some shows of the Vulnicura tour in 2015.

== Cover and usage in media ==
The track was covered by Michael Wollny and Heinz Sauer on their album Certain Beauty, under the title "Where is the Line (With You)". The track was also included on a compilation album released by Rough Trade, titled The Record Shop - 30 Years of Rough Trade Shops. The track was chosen by Richard Russell. A remix by Mike Patton, who contributed to the original song, was made available for download on War Child Music in April 2005.

== Track listings ==
- UK Promotional White label 12"
1. Where Is the Line (Matmos Rubberband Remix)
2. Where Is the Line (The Soft Pink Truth Glow Stick Museum Mix)
- UK Promotional White label 12"/Promo CDr
1. Who Is It (Vitalic Mix)
2. Where Is the Line (Fantômas Mix)
