= Triumph of a Heart =

Single by Björk

from the album Medúlla
- B-side: "Oceania"; "Desired Constellation"; "Vökuró"; "Mouth's Cradle"
- Released: 28 February 2005
- Genre: Pop; avant-pop; dance; hip hop
- Length: 4:04
- Label: One Little Indian
- Songwriter: Björk
- Producer: Björk

Björk singles chronology
"Who Is It" (2004)	"Triumph of a Heart" (2005)	"Earth Intruders" (2007)

Music video
- "Triumph of a Heart" on YouTube

"Triumph of a Heart" is a song recorded by Icelandic singer Björk for her fifth studio album Medúlla. Written and produced by Björk, the song features beatboxer Rahzel from The Roots, Gregory Purnhagen, and Japanese beatboxer Dokaka. "Triumph of a Heart" was released on 28 February 2005, by One Little Indian. A song with elements of pop, dance, and hip-hop, its lyrics have been described as being a celebration of "the workings of anatomy".

Critical reception towards "Triumph of a Heart" was mixed; whilst some music journalists noted that it was one of the only radio-friendly songs on Medúlla as well as a successful album closer, others called the track "erratic". The song fared moderately on music charts, peaking at the top ten in Spain and reaching the top 40 in Italy and the United Kingdom. The music video for "Triumph of a Heart", directed by Spike Jonze, depicts Björk married to a housecat, going out for a night out on the town. The track was also included on the 2007–2008 Volta tour.

== Composition ==
"Triumph of a Heart"
A 30 second sample of the song, where Björk sings the last chorus, whilst accompanied by "human trombone" singer Gregory Purnhagen, and beatboxers Rahzel and Dokaka.

Musically, "Triumph of a Heart" is a song with pop, avant-pop, dance, and hip-hop elements. According to Michael Hubbard from MusicOMH, the song begins with "balloons being blown up" and goes on to feature a sequenced cacophany of "meaows, mmmmms, parps, waaayaas and other side-splitting human voice noises all strung together like so many deranged pixies letting out their tensions in pixie disco land". "Triumph of a Heart" also features orchestral arrangements by the Icelandic and London Choirs, as well as hooks coming from a "human trombone", the singer Gregory Purnhagen, and beatboxers Rahzel and Dokaka. Sal Cinquemani from Slant Magazine said the track "could be described as "future disco", with human voices subbing for bass kick, horns, house snare, and oscillating synthesizers". In the song, Björk also lyrically "celebrates the workings of anatomy". In an interview with Radio X, Björk said that in fact the lyrics were "probably about just celebrating the body; cells doing rollercoaster rides up and down your body, in the blood and the lungs. Just singing". With Interview magazine, whilst asked about the song's lyrics, the singer stated that,

"I always think I'm saying something really upfront and direct. I guess through the years, I've probably done a lot of alternative medicine like acupuncture. I'm probably interested in the Chinese things overall. But that song is actually about that because—I don't know if you understand this—but I have a tendency to finish my kidney energy. It's my weakness. And if you kick your heels into the earth, you send back the kidney energy. So I was trying to have one verse about that, and one verse about oxygen, and one verse about the nerves".

== Critical reception ==
Dominique Leone, writing for Pitchfork magazine, said the track was one of the only songs on the album that might conceivably work on the radio. Chris Willman from Entertainment Weekly said "Triumph of a Heart" was "peppy" and "most easily digestible" than the rest of the album and "tucked away at the disc's end" it was like a "reward for making it through the more challenging passages". Justin Petrone of The Baltic Times newspaper said "Triumph of a Heart" was "as bouncy and pop as any of her best, a true symbol that the record has succeeded". BBC Manchester said that "the punching rhythm" of the track twitches "through the spine". Blender's Ann Powers recommended the track for download. Mark Daniell from Jam! website commented that "she envelops all sensory perceptions on the breathy, beat-box laden" songs like "Triumph of a Heart". David Buckley from Mojo said "of the 14 songs here, only 'Who Is It' and 'Triumph of a Heart' could in any way be called radio-friendly". Although People magazine gave Medúlla a negative review, it recommended "Triumph of a Heart" for download. The Milk Factory website noted on the song there were hints of Björk's poppier days "cleverly blended into Medúlla's unconventional template". Heather Phares from AllMusic said "there's something simian about Dokaka's gleeful babbling and beats" on "Triumph of a Heart".

Matthew Gasteiser from Prefix magazine commented that "Triumph of a Heart" closes the album with an "awe-inspiring performance" by Dokaka, who "helps create a dance beat complete with trumpet that could have fit right in on 1993's Debut", and that along with "Who Is It", it was an "excellent addition" to her catalogue, but noted that "both seem to be bereft of instruments simply to serve the concept. Fortunately, Bjork arranged them as lynchpins, holding the record's emotional strands together". Dom Sinacola from Coke Machine Glow website said that the track reunites "a clean menagerie of guest stars, rolling out Dokaka, Rahzel, and a bit of Schlomo for a tweaked disco boogie. Björk answers with a pump-crushing final anthem of sorts, going out breathlessly". Although he called it "abrupt and winded", he felt that the song was "just incomplete". According to Spence D. from IGN "Triumph of a Heart" was "the most erratic and quirky number of the entire set". Whilst the "human trombone" of Gregory Purnhagen "intertwines itself with the dueling beatbox verbal acrobatics of Rahzel and Dokaka", it creates a "strange cross culture of head nodding dance music and fairy tale pop cacophony". Brent DiCrescenzo from Time Out magazine ranked "Triumph of a Heart" as the sixth of "The 11 best Björk songs ever", calling the song "brilliant", and elaborating that "this album closer is the playful polar opposite of uptight".

== Chart performance ==
In the United Kingdom, "Triumph of a Heart" debuted at its peak of number 31 on the UK Singles Chart on the issue dated 6 March 2005, and as of 2020, remains her last UK Top 40 hit. The song debuted at number 45 in Italy on 17 March 2005, before peaking at number 33 the week after. It fell off the chart the next week. In France, "Triumph of a Heart" debuted at its peak of number 63, before spending four other weeks and falling off the chart. It was a success in Spain, debuting at number seven on the issue dated 6 March 2005, and peaking at number six.

== Music video ==
Björk and her husband, played by a cat, in the music video for "Triumph of a Heart"

The accompanying music video for "Triumph of a Heart" was directed by Spike Jonze, who also directed the videos for "It's Oh So Quiet" and "It's in Our Hands". It was filmed in August 2004 in Reykjavík, Iceland, Björk's hometown. The video was premiered on 21 January 2005 through Björk's official website. In the video, Björk, tired of her husband, a cat, storms out of the house for a night out on the town. She goes to a pub where she drinks and hangs out with some friends. Then, she goes to the restrooms and the song stops, and the locals, including Dokaka, start beatboxing and making noises. When Björk is back, she joins the crew for a special performance of the song recorded for the video with samples from the "Audition Mix" of the song.

They go out of the pub and Björk runs through the town drunk, falling over at one point. Later, she wakes up on a road with scratches and bruises all over her body. The forehead injury really happened during filming. She gets up and continues to sing the song, with hearts coming from her mouth. The cat-husband sees the hearts from his house and finds out Björk's location. He picks her up in his car and they go home. At home, the two share a kiss and dance as the song ends. The making of the video is documented in a bonus feature that appears on The Medúlla Videos DVD (2005), which focuses on the auditions for the bar patrons who had to be able to make the noises and sound effects required for the song. An image of the cat in a suit reading a newspaper has become a popular internet meme, known as the "I Should Buy A..." meme.

The video was well received by critics. It was placed number two on "The 10 best Björk music videos" list by Time Out magazine's David Ehrlich, who said that "it sure feels like the greatest music video ever made while you're watching it", also saying that the video's ending shows that "Björk is an independent woman, but it's always nice to have someone to dance with during breakfast". The video was also the 50th on "The 50 Best Music Videos of the Aughts" list by Slant Magazine, with Ed Gonzalez commenting that it "is more than just an uproarious collection of sight gags". The same magazine chose the video as the seventh best music video by Björk.

== Live performance ==
"Triumph of a Heart" was first performed live on 20 April 2008 during the Volta tour at the Hammersmith Apollo in London. It was also added to setlists for other shows during the tour.

== Track listings and formats ==
UK 2-track CD single 1

1. "Triumph of a Heart" (Radio Edit) – 3:00
2. "Desired Constellation" (Ben Frost's School of Emotional Engineering Mix) – 5:54

UK CD maxi-single 2

1. "Triumph of a Heart" (Audition Mix) – 4:17
2. "Vökuró" (Gonzales VV Mix) – 4:18
3. "Mouth's Cradle" (Mouth Recomposed by Ensemble) – 4:11

European CD maxi-single

1. "Triumph of a Heart" (Audition Mix) – 4:17
2. "Vökuró" (Gonzales VV Mix) – 4:18
3. "Mouth's Cradle" (Mouth Recomposed by Ensemble) – 4:11
4. "Desired Constellation" (Ben Frost's School of Emotional Engineering Mix) – 5:54
5. "Triumph of a Heart" (Radio Edit) – 3:00

European and UK DVD single

1. "Triumph of a Heart" (Video) – 5:22
2. "Oceania" (Piano & Vocal) – 2:59
3. "Desired Constellation" (Choir Mix) – 4:44

== Credits and personnel ==
Credits adapted from Medúlla album booklet.

- Björk – lead vocals, songwriting, producer, arrangement, programming
- Dokaka – beatboxing
- Rahzel – beatboxing
- Mark Bell – programming
- Gregory Purnhagen – human trombone
- Valgeir Sigurdsson – programming
- Mark "Spike" Stent – mixing

== Charts ==
Chart (2005)	Peak position
France (SNEP)	63
Italy (FIMI)	33
Scotland Singles (Official Charts)	43
Spain (Promusicae)	6
UK Singles (Official Charts)	31
UK Indie (Official Charts)	3
