= Miraikan =

Science and technology museum in Odaiba, Tokyo, Japan

Miraikan – The National Museum of Emerging Science and Innovation
- 日本科学未来館
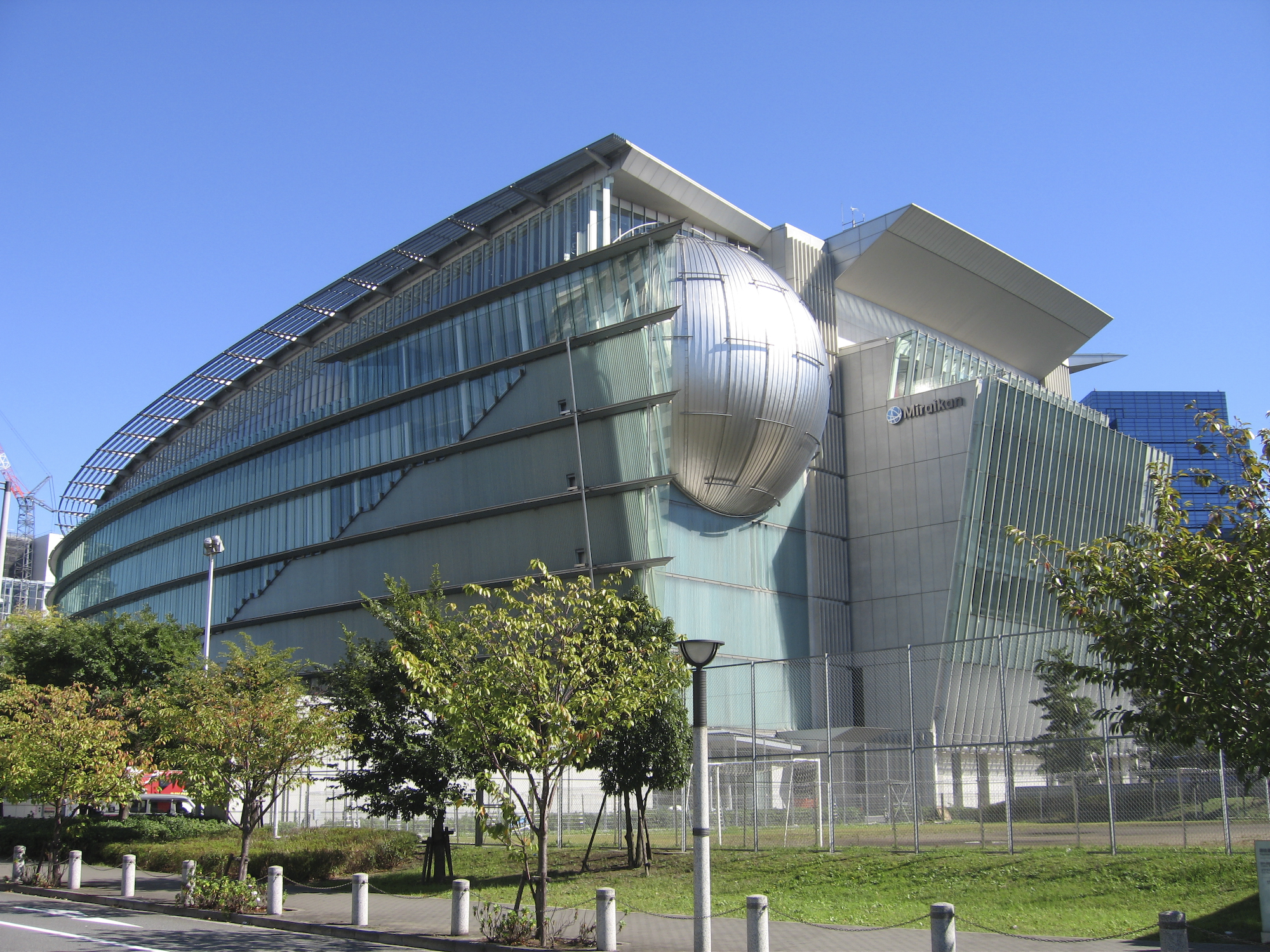
- Established: 2001
- Location: 2-3-6 Aomi, Koto-ku, Odaiba, Tokyo, Japan
- Coordinates: 35.619010°N 139.777010°E
- Type: Science Centre
- Accreditation: Asia Pacific Network of Science & Technology Centres (ASPAC)
- Website: miraikan.jst.go.jp/en/

The National Museum of Emerging Science and Innovation (日本科学未来館, Nippon Kagaku Mirai-kan), simply known as the Miraikan (未来館; literally "Future Museum"), is a museum created by Japan's Science and Technology Agency.

It was opened in 2001. It is situated in a purpose-built building in the Odaiba District of Tokyo. It can be reached by the Yurikamome driverless fully automated transit system from downtown Tokyo in about 20 minutes.

== Permanent exhibition "Explore the frontiers" ==
The "Explore the frontiers" zone is a permament exhibition area that examines the structural formation of the Earth, the evolution of life, and the broader cosmos across multiple spatial and temporal scales.

The exhibition contextualizes the development of the Earth's environment and the Solar System within a 13.8-billion-year cosmic history. It focuses primarily on the origins of humanity and the ongoing interactions between human societies and the natural world. By presenting various scientific frameworks, the zone is designed to encourage analytical assessment regarding the future trajectory of human development.

== Permanent exhibition "Create your future" ==
"Create your future" zone illustrates desirable societies and lifestyles, and considers ideas people can use to achieve them. The exhibit asks "What science and technology is needed, and how should people use it to develop a society that can sustain a world population in excess of eight billion?". Create your future provides a projection of a future society and the search for knowledge.

Demonstrations by the humanoid robot ASIMO have ended as of March 31, 2022.

== Symbol exhibit "Geo-Cosmos" ==
The Geo-Cosmos is the symbol exhibit of the Miraikan and projects the figure of the Earth shining in space, with a pixel resolution that exceeds 10 million. It was upgraded with LED panels. The HDR (High Dynamic Range) panels and wider color gamut deliver richer, deeper color and light expression.

== Special exhibitions ==
Every year between two and three specially curated exhibitions are produced and shown, with science and art often overlapping. They dealt with a wide range of topics from "The NINJA – who were they?" to the "Detective Conan: Scientific Investigation" and "You and Robots – What is it to be Human?". In 2012, the Special Exhibition "The Story of the End of the World: 73 Questions We Must Answer" dealt with the Tohoku earthquake and its aftermath.

== Gallery ==
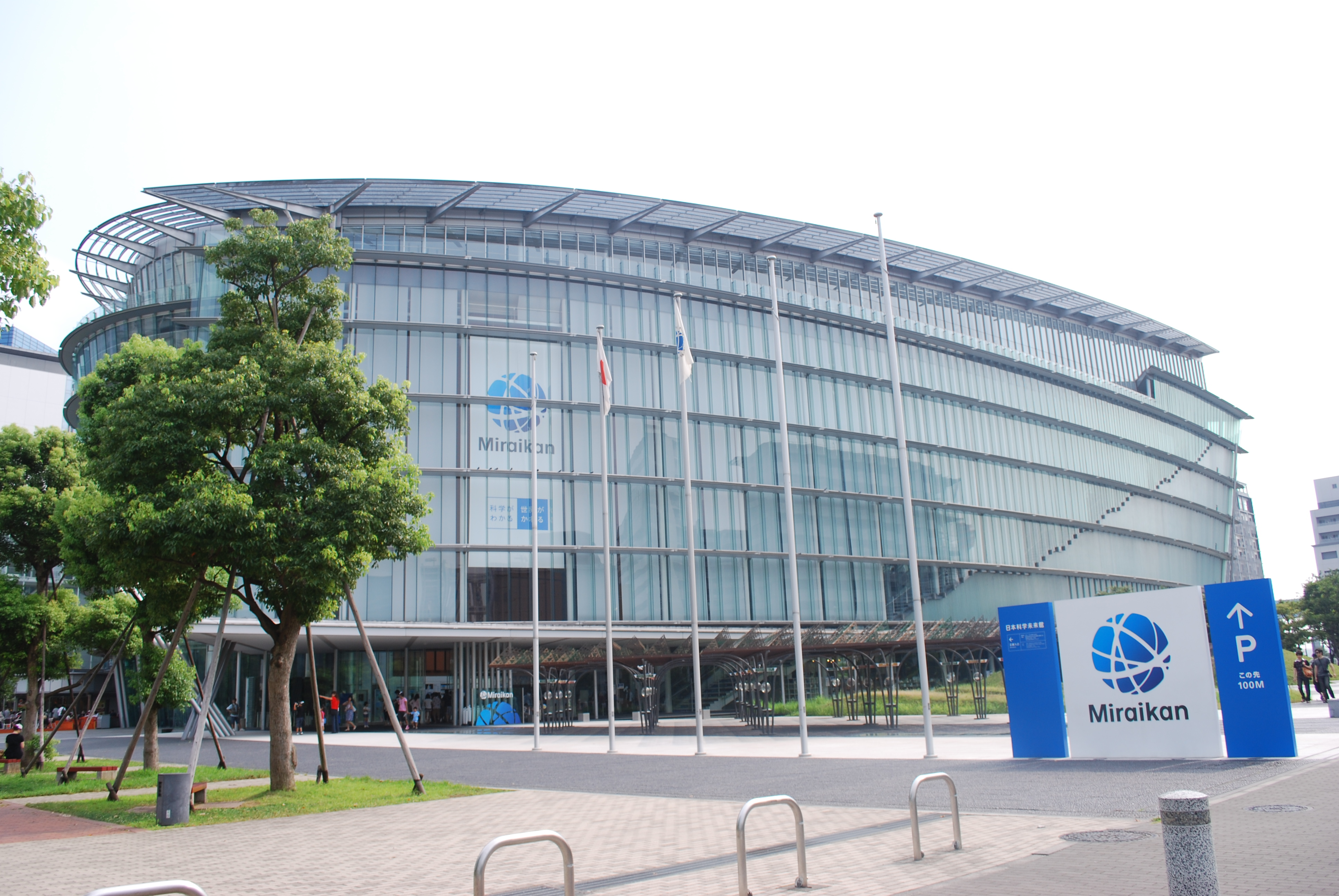
Miraikan – The National Museum of Emerging Science and Innovation

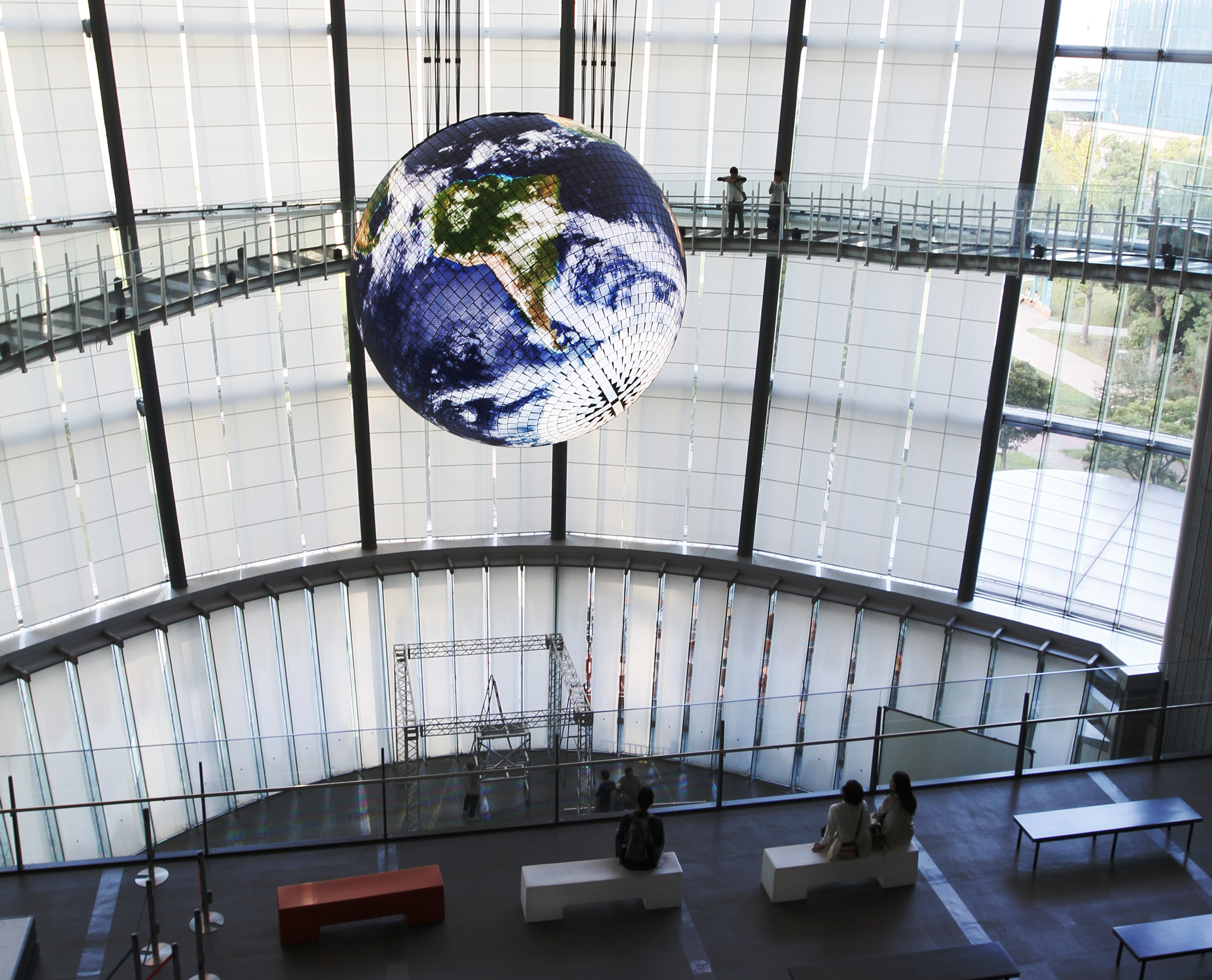
Symbol Exhibit "Geo-Cosmos"

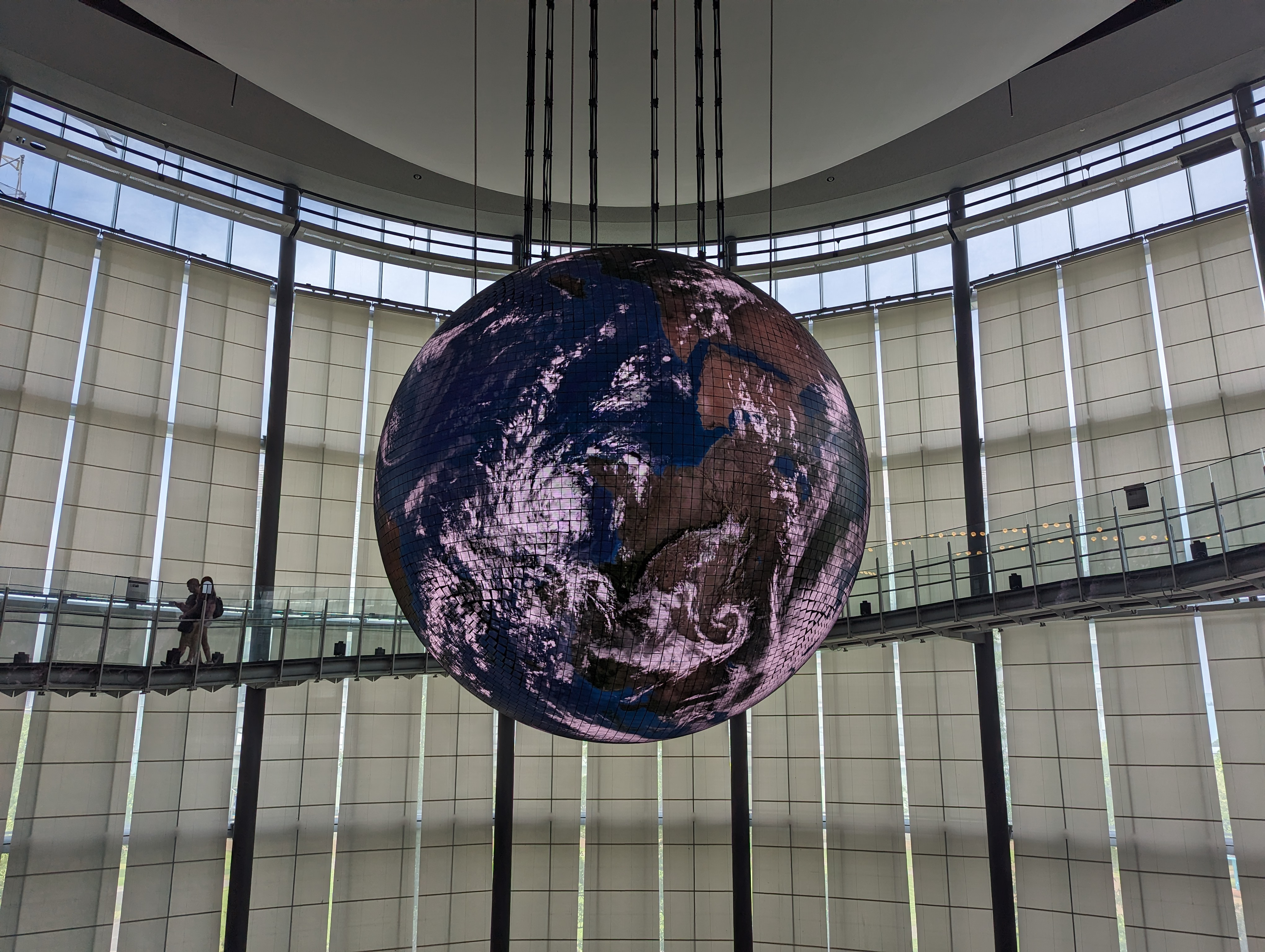
Geo-Cosmos from a different angle

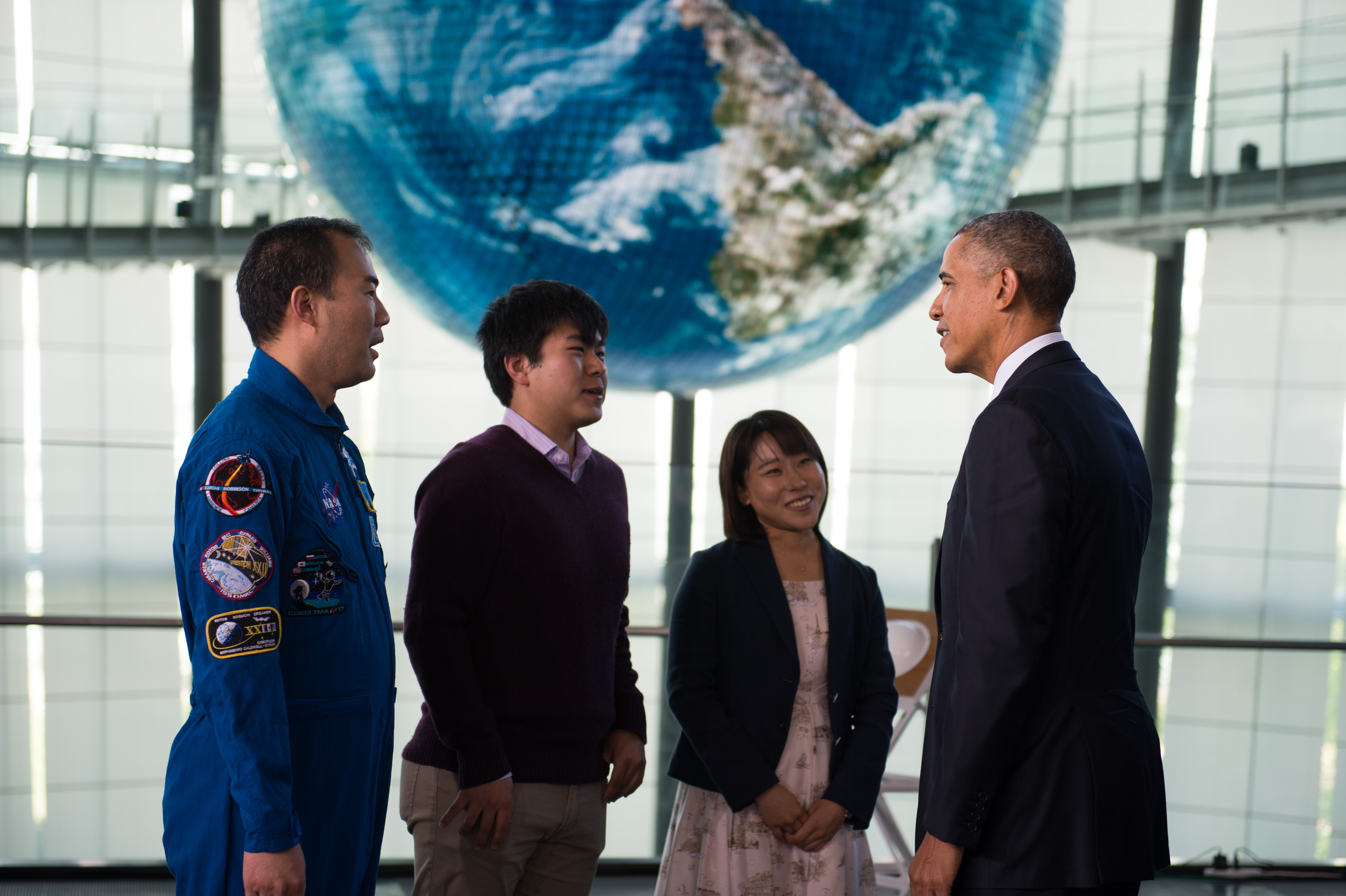
US President Obama talks to Japanese Astronaut Soichi Noguchi under the Geo-Cosmos, 2014

== See also ==
- List of museums in Tokyo
