= Gabríela Friðriksdóttir =

Icelandic visual artist, painter and sculptor

Gabríela Friðriksdóttir (born 1971 in Reykjavík, Iceland) is an Icelandic visual artist, painter and sculptor.

In 2005, she represented Iceland at the Venice Biennale, and she is a previous winner of Iceland's Gudmunda Art Prize (2001). She has also shown at Migros Museum, Zurich; Centre Pompidou, Paris; National Gallery, Reykjavik; Museum of Modern Art, Oslo; and Kunsthaus Graz.

Friðriksdóttir has had several solo exhibitions including 'Crepusculum' at Schirn Kunsthalle Frankfurt in 2011, 'Inner Life of a Hay-bale' at Gallery Gamma, Reykjavík, Iceland, in 2016, and 'GABRIELA' at Hverfisgallery, Reykjavík, Iceland in 2018.

She is also known for her collaboration with the Icelandic musician and superstar Björk. The two collaborated on Björk's 2002 CD box set Family Tree and on the 2005 video for Björk's song "Where is the Line" from the album Medúlla. The two also combined their multimedia efforts at the 2005 La Biennale di Venezia in Venice, Italy. In addition to being credited as a co-director and co-creative director, she created the artwork for Björk's "Victimhood" music video, released on 5 September 2023, from her album Fossora.

Her work has been associated with New Gothic Art.
