= Medúlla =

Studio album by Björk
- Released: 30 August 2004
- Recorded: 2001 – May 2004
- Studios: Greenhouse (Reykjavík, Iceland); Ilha dos Sapos (Salvador, Brazil); Lost Island (La Gomera, Spain); Magic Shop (New York City); Looking Glass (New York City); Olympic (London, England); Real World (Wiltshire, England)
- Genres: A cappella; avant-garde; experimental
- Length: 45:45
- Languages: English; Icelandic
- Labels: One Little Independent Records; Elektra
- Producers: Björk; Mark Bell

Björk chronology
Vespertine Live (2004)	Medúlla (2004)	Army of Me: Remixes and Covers (2005)

Singles from Medúlla
- 1. "Oceania (song)" Released: 13 August 2004; 2. "Who Is It (Carry My Joy on the Left, Carry My Pain on the Right)" Released: 18 October 2004; 3. "Triumph of a Heart" Released: 28 February 2005

Medúlla is the fifth studio album by Icelandic recording artist Björk. (Note: Medúlla is officially considered to be the fifth solo album, although, technically, it can be viewed as sixth if counting her 1977 juvenilia work, or seventh, counting her 1990 jazz output Gling-Gló.) It was released on 30 August 2004 in the United Kingdom by One Little Independent Records and in the United States by Elektra Entertainment. After the release of her electronic-influenced previous album Vespertine (2001), Björk intended to make an album almost entirely constructed with human vocals, in contrast to the previous album's intense process of composition and multiple layers of instrumentation. The album's title derives from the Latin word for "marrow".

Medúlla received critical acclaim from music critics, with many calling it "unique", although others deemed it "confusing". Although the album was not as commercially successful as her previous albums, it did reach number one in the charts of France, Iceland and Wallonia, whilst also peaking within the top ten in the United Kingdom. Medúlla is estimated to have sold more than a million copies worldwide, and received two nominations at the 47th Grammy Awards.

The promotional single for Medúlla is "Oceania". Two more singles were released from Medúlla: "Who Is It" and "Triumph of a Heart", with both charting inside the top 40 in the United Kingdom and the top 10 in Spain. Björk further promoted the album by performing "Oceania" at the 2004 Summer Olympics opening ceremony, Friday Night with Jonathan Ross and other television and radio shows. Other than these few performances, no concerts or tours were arranged to promote Medúlla, as Björk thought it would be too difficult to play the songs live.

== Background and production ==
Björk began working on her fifth studio album in 2002, being known as The Lake Album at the time. In an interview with The New Yorker, she explained that she wanted to avoid instruments and electronics present on her previous album, Vespertine (2001), and said that the project was "very introverted" and "was avoiding eye contact". Whilst she was finishing Vespertine, Björk wanted to make an album composed of vocals, and wanted to since her teenage years. According to her, majority of the album is related to the time when she was 17 to 18 years old, focusing on life, love, family, and friends. She commented that she used to live "carefree" as a teenager, and how others affected the way she thought, saying that it is shown in Medúlla. Björk began working on the album while eight months pregnant by adding her own live drumming to the arrangements of previously recorded demos. She then started muting the instruments, and liked the result of it. She was inspired by paganism, and the idea of returning to a universe that is entirely human, without tools or religion or nationalities. "I wanted the record to be like muscle, blood, flesh. We could be in a cave somewhere and one person would start singing, and another person would sing a beat and then the next person sing a melody, and you could just kind of be really happy in your cave. It's quite rootsy", she added.

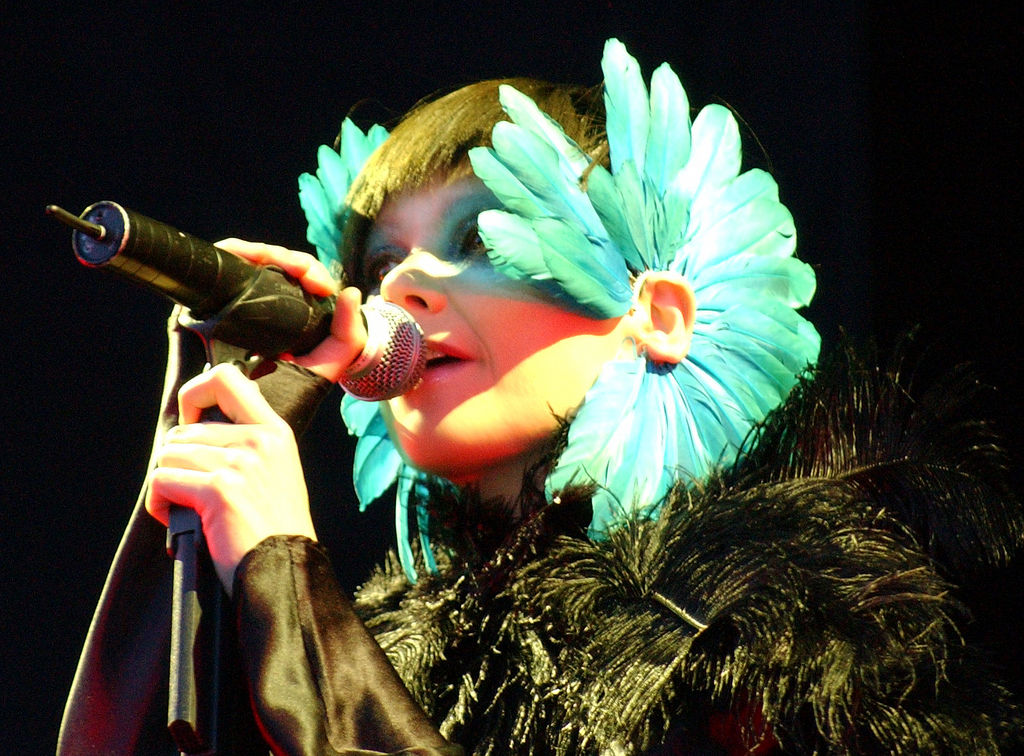
Björk performing in 2003, when she was writing Medúlla

Tanya Tagaq, an Inuk throat singer who worked with Björk on her 2001 Vespertine world tour, was also featured. Björk was so impressed with her voice's ability that she invited Tagaq to work with her on the album. She asked British singer Robert Wyatt to be a featured vocalist on the album, as she was looking for something more "passionate" and "human". Additionally, the musician "wanted a bit of rock" on Medúlla, so she invited singer Mike Patton of rock band Faith No More. Björk also invited the London and Icelandic choirs, in order to have a classical feel on the album. However, the "musical fascist" in her decided using any MCs or vocal percussionists would be too "cheesy"; she later changed her mind when she saw beatboxer Rahzel from The Roots freestyle a whole Kraftwerk track without pausing for breath. Björk found his voice "above and beyond any cliché" and thought he was perfect for the album's beat-based songs. Another beatboxer, Dokaka, was invited after Björk got a link to his webpage and liked his covers so much that she decided to work with him; he appears on a few songs.

American singer Beyoncé was planned to be featured on the album as well, but she did not appear due to scheduling issues. When asked what she liked about Beyoncé, Björk stated that "[Medúlla] is an album about voices, and she's got the most amazing voice."

== Artwork and title ==
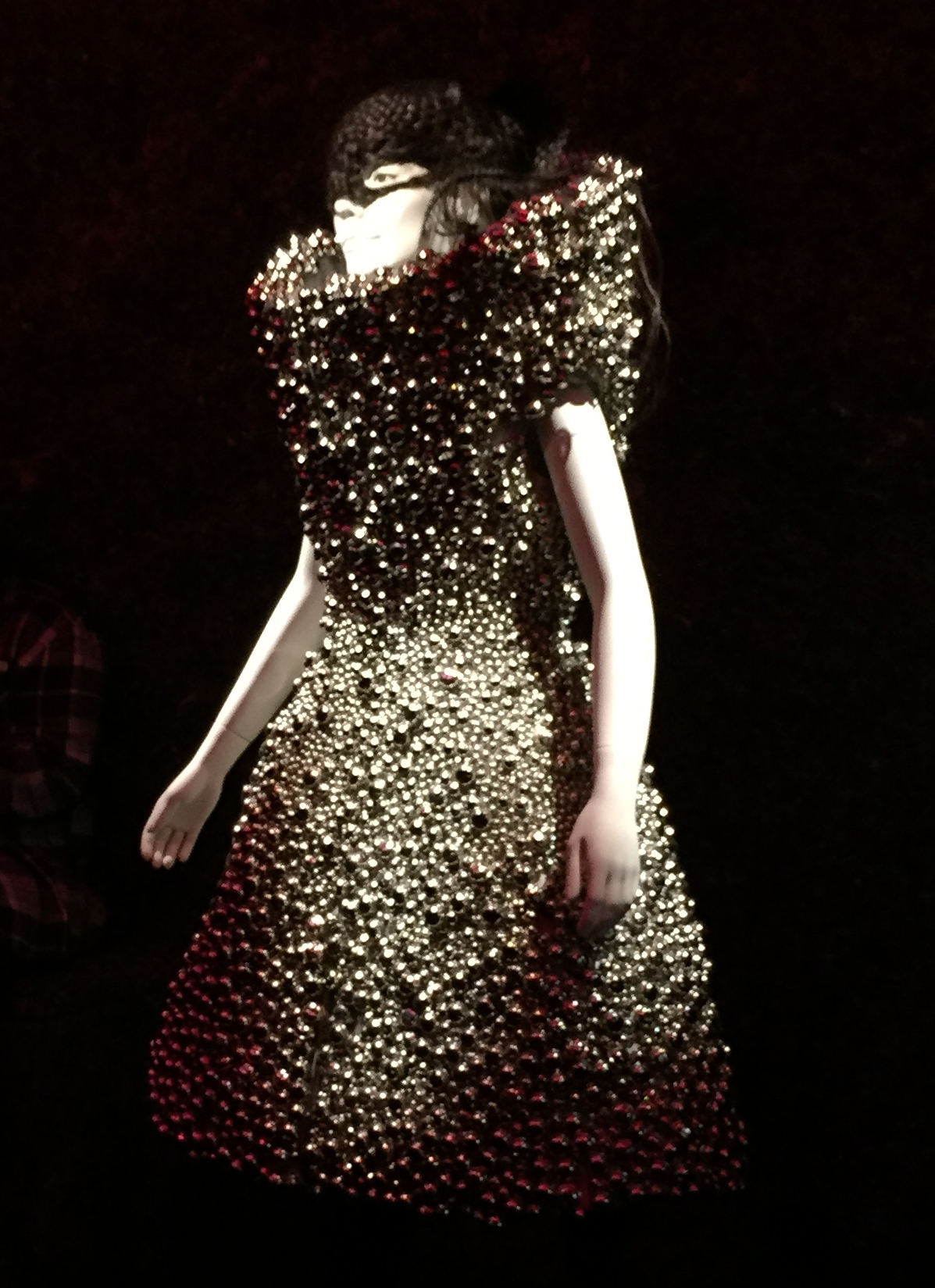
A mannequin wearing the hair mask and the Alexander McQueen–designed bell dress from the "Who Is It" music video, at Björk's exhibition at MoMA

The album cover for Medúlla was photographed by duo Inez van Lamsweerde and Vinoodh Matadin in London, on 28 June 2004, and designed by M/M Paris. It features Björk wearing a mask made of hair, which was made specifically for the shoot, a black dress and a necklace that is made of black "bones" that says "Medúlla". The hair mask was created by Icelandic artist Shoplifter. The artist stated that in 2004, she had a show at ATM Gallery, where she displayed a wall mural made of brown braids. Björk appreciated it, and then invited her to work on creating a hair sculpture for the Medúlla's character. She also explained that the singer wanted it to have a darkness about it, and then she sent Björk several references of extreme hairstyles, and because the album was made with voices, Björk wanted something that was part of the human body.

Van Lamsweerde said that they "were all inspired by women's handicrafts and this idea of being in your own cocoon in your home, with your family, and this reclusive character that hand-makes the whole world around her". The hairpiece was part of her 2015 MoMA retrospective. In an interview with Style magazine, Shoplifter talked about her part at the exhibition, explaining that it dedicated a room to each album of Björk's career, with the Medúlla section having a mannequin wearing the hair mask and the dress designed by Alexander McQueen which she wore in the music video for "Who Is It".

The title was announced in June 2004 through Björk's official website. She had struggled to choose a suitable title while preparing the album. She said that something in her "wanted to leave out civilisation, to rewind to before it all happened and work out, 'Where is the human soul? What if we do without civilisation and religion and patriotism, without the stuff that has gone wrong?'" She provisionally called it Ink, a title that suggested to her the idea of "that black, 5,000-year-old blood that's inside us all; an ancient spirit that's passionate and dark and survives." Her friend Gabriela then suggested "medulla", a medical term for "marrow" in Latin. She noted that the word refers not only to bone marrow, but also to various other anatomical structures, including parts of the kidney and of hair; in this sense, she said the word represented "getting to the essence of something". The accent on the letter "ú" was intended to make the word cuter with a pun on the Icelandic word "dúlla": "We thought it was funny," she said, "then it became mysterious."

== Composition ==
=== Style and influences ===
"Everybody was going, 'Oh she's making a vocal album, it'll be a horrible Yoko Ono experience'. But I wanted to show that a vocal album doesn't have to be for the chosen few. It was just about working with the instrument I know best, my voice".

— Björk describing the sound of Medúlla.

At the time of its construction, Björk considered Medúlla to be her most political album, saying that it countered outbreaks of racism and patriotism that followed the 11 September attacks. "On 9/11, in the space of a half an hour, this became the most patriotic place on earth", she recalled. "I remember describing to my friends on my phone that [if] I turned 180 degrees anywhere I was in New York. I would count at least 37 American flags. So it was kind of scary for a foreigner to be here". Regarding the album's composition, Björk also mentioned that she tried to find the common soul in everything, outside nationality and religion, whilst elaborating that she felt that "in that sense, it's a greatest hits of human spiritualism [laughs]. I think it's the first time I have done an album while I am reading the news. These are crazy times. It just seems that patriotism is a bad idea. I don't know how directly the album reflects that, but it is sort of anti-patriotic. Anti-Iceland as much as anti-anything".

Medúlla is almost entirely a cappella, also demonstrating avant-garde and experimental music. musicOMH's review stated that, "Despite its voice-only premise, Medúlla shows off a mile-wide scope of influences", noting elements of folk and medieval music, despite Björk previously stating that Medúlla was "folk music, but without any folk attached" to the album. She also considered the styles encompassing the album as "primitive and silly". Wondering Sound wrote that despite "its comparative starkness, [Medúlla is] every bit as sensual as [Vespertine]". The publication also added: "The electronic treatments range from industrial distortion to percussive glitches and dreamy layering, rarely descending into novelty". The album combines beatboxing, classical choirs that suggest composers like Penderecki or Arvo Pärt, and "mews, moans, counterpoint and guttural grunts" provided by herself and guests like Mike Patton, Robert Wyatt and Tanya Tagaq. Medúlla includes "vocal fantasias" that lean toward chamber music, alongside tracks that "are obviously but distantly connected to hip-hop." Glimpses of Bulgarian women's choirs, the polyphony of central African pygmies, and the "primal vocalisms" of Meredith Monk were also noted.

=== Songs ===
The album opens with "Pleasure Is All Mine", which begins with a vocal harmony layered on top of a woman's panting for a short while prior to when Björk starts singing her verses. The verses additionally have the background filled by a harmonic and cathedral-mimicking choir. Björk sings "When in doubt: give" repeatedly, yielding contrast to an "alarming" groove. "Show Me Forgiveness", an a cappella "short confessional anthem" follows, having no other effect than a subtle echo exerted onto her voice. She sings: "Show me forgiveness / For having lost faith in myself / And let my own interior up / To inferior forces / The shame is endless". During the third song "Where Is the Line", she lyrically attacks a younger relative for being greedy and unreliable, displaying vexation: "I'm elastic for you, but enough is enough". "Demonic vocals" are delivered by singer Mike Patton, and "angelically dissonant swaths of lush singing" from the Icelandic Choir; as Rahzel beatboxes, the choir emotes some "ahhhs". The song grows darker as it builds up as the male members of the choir deliver heavier sounds. The "somber" song called "Vökuró", originally by Jórunn Viðar, is the fourth track on Medúlla. The song is in Icelandic; Björk rolls her tongue around certain words, accompanied by a choir.

During the fifth track "Öll Birtan", Björk's voice is layered over several times, with a voice resembling a drone in the left channel, whilst "doot-doos" echo into the right side of the audio. The following song and lead single "Who Is It" features collaborations by Inuk throat singer Tanya Tagaq and Rahzel. Some lyrics of the song—"Who is it that never lets you down?"—may be understood to reflect a "mother's unconditional love" in a dialogue between mother and child. The echo effects in "Who Is It" may additionally reflect the scattered sense of self the mother may experience as she carries the burden of constant care for her child. "Submarine", the seventh track on the album, was influenced by Björk's pregnancy with her daughter Ísadóra and how she felt somewhat lazy during that time. It has a "hint of political consciousness", and features the "reedy" voice of singer Robert Wyatt multiplied into a chorus to share lines like "Shake us out of the heavy deep sleep, do it now". The next track "Desired Constellation" was created from a sample of Björk singing the phrase "I'm not sure what to do with it" from "Hidden Place" on her previous album, Vespertine. She imagines herself "With a palm full of stars/ I throw them like dice on the table/ Until the desired constellation appears".

The ninth song, "Oceania", is about "Mother Oceania", from whom Björk believes all life materialised, whilst she sings: "You have done well for yourselves / Since you left my wet embrace / And crawled ashore". "Oceania" also features The London Choir. Tenth song "Sonnets/Unrealities XI" was based on the poem "It May Not Always Be So; And I Say" by E. E. Cummings, and features only Björk's singing, with small inflections from the Icelandic Choir while she bids farewell to a lover lyrically. The following track "Ancestors" has no lyrics, featuring only Björk and Tagaq's voices. The twelfth song "Mouth's Cradle" is paced by a "glug, glug" sample of "what might as well be the emptying of a gallon bottle of water". Lyrically, she concludes: "I need a shelter to build an altar away from Osamas and Bushes". On the thirteenth track of the album, "Miðvikudags", Björk sings once again in gibberish, while some "doot-doos" can be heard in the background, reminiscent of "Öll Birtan". On the closing track and second single, "Triumph of a Heart", the singer lyrically "celebrates the workings of anatomy", whilst musically it is the album's closest thing to a dance track. The song also features orchestral arrangements by the Icelandic and London Choirs, as well as hooks coming from a "human trombone", herself, Gregory Purnhagen, and Rahzel and Dokaka.

== Release and promotion ==
On 3 August 2004, BBC Radio 1's The Breezeblock show premiered the tracks "Pleasure Is All Mine" and "Mouth's Cradle", whilst The New York Times newspaper has posted on their website short clips for four tracks "Mouth's Cradle", "Oceania", "Where Is the Line" and "Who Is It". Medúlla was first released on 30 August 2004 worldwide through Polydor Records, whilst it was distributed in the United Kingdom by One Little Independent Records. In the United States, the album was released the day after, by Elektra Records. Lead single "Who Is It" reached the top five in Spain, also peaking within the top 30 in Italy and the United Kingdom. Second single "Triumph of a Heart" peaked at the top ten in Spain, and reached the top 40 in Italy and the United Kingdom.

"Oceania" was commissioned by the International Olympic Committee and performed at the 2004 Summer Olympics opening ceremony. She wore a very large dress which unfolded during her performance to eventually occupy the entire stadium and showed a map of the world in sign of union. On 8 October 2004, Björk performed at the BBC Studios for the show Friday Night with Jonathan Ross. She performed a bell choir mix of "Who Is It" with Rahzel and an English bell choir. On 10 October 2004, Björk performed a set of five songs live in studio for Gilles Peterson's BBC Radio 1 program. On 25 October 2004, Björk performed a set of six songs for the French television show Album de la Semaine at Canal+ studios in Paris, France.

Other than these few performances, no concerts or tours were arranged to promote Medúlla. Björk said in an interview that "everybody involved seems to be up for it, so maybe they'll all come on the road. What I'd like to do is make another album like this and then tour for two of them at once". She also spoke to Rolling Stone in June 2004 and told that she wished to immediately continue writing and recording yet another new album: "Every album I've done, the minute that it's done, I feel really lubricated and, like, 'Wow, now I can write an album in five minutes'... And I just want to find out if that's just a fantasy or if it's true." In 2015, the album was adapted into an opera at La Monnaie by Sjaron Minailo and Anat Spiegel.

== Critical reception ==
Professional ratings
Aggregate scores
Source	Rating
Metacritic	84/100
Review scores
Source	Rating
AllMusic	4/5 stars
Entertainment Weekly	A
The Guardian	5/5 stars
Los Angeles Times	3.5/4 stars
Mojo	4/5 stars
NME	8/10
Pitchfork	8.4/10
Q	3/5 stars
Rolling Stone	3.5/5 stars
Spin	B+

Medúlla received acclaim from music critics. The album holds a rating of 84 out of 100 at Metacritic. The Guardian newspaper's David Peschek gave it five stars out of five and heralded it as "brave and unique". Dominique Leone from Pitchfork commented that Medúlla was "an interesting record", while saying Björk had "found a way to bathe her immediately distinctive melodies and vocal nuances in solutions that cause me to reevaluate her voice and her craft". Barry Walters of Rolling Stone stated that Medúlla was simultaneously Björk's "most extreme" record and "the most immediately accessible". Blender's Ann Powers was also positive, calling it "another playful step" in Björk's "unstoppable, wandering quest". Matthew Gasteier from Prefix magazine called Medúlla her most exuberant album since Post, as well as her oddest at the time. Mark Daniell from Canadian website Jam! also gave it a positive review, saying "pairing gooey purrs with grooves provided by a human trombone might not seem like a good idea, but when Björk is the one making the arrangements the effect is spine tingling". Andy Battaglia of The A.V. Club said that "once perceptions and expectations settle out... the album proves arrestingly in thrall to its own twisted tongue".

Heather Phares of AllMusic thought that Medúlla was "not an immediate album, but it is a fascinating one, especially for anyone interested in the world's oldest instrument being used in unexpected ways". Jennifer Vineyard from MTV News called the album "an ambitious project", but not because it was almost entirely a cappella. She said that some songs are "pretty unusual", as some could be medieval hymns, and others could be modern pop songs. E! Online commented that "fans of the Icelandic wonder's more orchestral tunes might think there's something missing here. Well, unless they're too busy being totally blown away". David Hooper from BBC Music gave Medúlla a mixed review, praising its high points and lack of dullness, but feeling that the album left him "rather confused" due to what he found to be excessive experimentation, thus remarking that the album was "disjointed" and "claustrophobic". Björk received two Grammy Award nominations for Medúlla, including Best Female Pop Vocal Performance for "Oceania", and Best Alternative Music Album. The album was also featured in the book 1001 Albums You Must Hear Before You Die.

== Commercial performance ==
In the United Kingdom, Medúlla debuted at its peak of number nine on the UK Albums Chart, for the issue dated 11 September 2004, and remained for three weeks on the chart. The album was certified Silver on 10 December 2004, by the British Phonographic Industry (BPI), for shipments of at least 60,000 copies in the region. In Austria, Medúlla debuted and peaked at number six, remaining on the albums chart for seven weeks. In France, it peaked at number one on the albums chart, during the week dated 29 August 2004, remaining on the top for another week. After spending 24 weeks on the chart, Medúlla was certified Gold by the Syndicat National de l'Édition Phonographique (SNEP). In Björk's native Iceland, the album debuted at the top of the chart, staying there for three weeks. It peaked at number two in Italy, spending nine weeks on the chart.

In the United States, Medúlla debuted at number 14 on the Billboard 200 albums chart on the issue dated 18 September 2004, selling 65,000 copies in its first week and remaining for seven weeks inside the chart. Additionally, Medúlla also topped the Dance/Electronic Albums chart. As of May 2007 it has sold 235,000 copies in the region, according to Nielsen SoundScan. In Australia, Medúlla debuted at number 17 on the ARIA Charts, on the issue dated 12 September 2004. It spent three weeks on the chart, falling off at number 40. In New Zealand, the album peaked at number 35 and spent two weeks inside the New Zealand Albums Chart. As of May 2014, Medúlla has sold more than a million copies worldwide.

== Track listing ==
All tracks are produced by Björk, except "Where Is the Line", "Submarine" and "Oceania", produced with Mark Bell.

All tracks are written by Björk, except where noted.

Medúlla
No.	Title	Writer(s)	Length
1.	"Pleasure Is All Mine"		3:26
2.	"Show Me Forgiveness"		1:23
3.	"Where Is the Line"		4:41
4.	"Vökuró"	Jórunn Viðar; Jakobína Sigurðardóttir	3:14
5.	"Öll Birtan"		1:52
6.	"Who Is It (Carry My Joy on the Left, Carry My Pain on the Right)"		3:57
7.	"Submarine"		3:13
8.	"Desired Constellation"	Björk; Olivier Alary	4:55
9.	"Oceania"	Björk; Sjón	3:24
10.	"Sonnets / Unrealities XI"	Björk; E. E. Cummings	1:59
11.	"Ancestors"	Björk; Tagaq	4:08
12.	"Mouth's Cradle"		3:59
13.	"Miðvikudags"		1:24
14.	"Triumph of a Heart"		4:04
Total length:			45:45

Japanese/iTunes bonus track
No.	Title	Length
15.	"Komið"	2:02
Total length:		47:41

Notes

The following track titles are roughly translated from Icelandic to English:

- "Vökuró" = wakefulness
- "Öll Birtan" = all the light
- "Miðvikudags" = Wednesday
- "Komið" = come

== Personnel ==
Credits adapted from Medúlla liner notes.

- Björk – lead vocals, arrangement, programming (tracks 1, 3, 5, 6, 9, 11–14), choir arrangement, bass line (track 1), bass synth (track 6), piano (track 11)
- Tagaq – Inuit throat singing (tracks 1, 6, 11, 12)
- Mike Patton – vocals (tracks 1, 3)
- Robert Wyatt – vocals (tracks 7, 9)
- Rahzel – beatboxing (tracks 1, 3, 6, 12, 14)
- Shlomo – beatboxing (track 9)
- Dokaka – beatboxing (track 14)
- Gregory Purnhagen – human trombone (tracks 3, 14)
- The Icelandic Choir – choral vocals (tracks 1, 3, 4, 8, 10, 11)
- The London Choir – choral vocals (track 9)
- Nico Muhly – piano (track 9)
- Mark Bell – bass synthesizer (track 12), programming (tracks 1, 3, 6, 9, 12, 14)
- Peter Van Hooke – gong (track 1)
- Little Miss Spectra – programming (track 3)
- Matmos – programming (track 6)
- Olivier Alary – programming (track 8)
- Valgeir Sigurdsson – programming (tracks 1, 3, 6, 7, 9, 12, 14)
- Mark "Spike" Stent – mixing
- Nick Ingham – conductor (Olympic Studios choir session)
- Karl Olgeirsson – copyist (Iceland sessions)
- Nick Mera – copyist (London session)
- Sturla Thorisson – engineer (assistant, Greenhouse Studios)
- Christian Rutledge – engineer (assistant, Looking Glass)
- Rob Haggett – engineer (assistant, Olympic Studios)
- David Treahearn – engineer (assistant, Olympic Studios)
- Juan Garcia – engineer (assistant, The Magic Shop)
- Flavio de Souza – engineer (Ilha Dos Sapos Studios)
- Ichiho Nishiki – engineer (Looking Glass)
- Neil Dorfsman – additional recording
- Jake Davies – additional recording
- M/M Paris – art direction, design
- Shoplifter / Hrafnhildur Arnardóttir – artwork (hair sculpture)
- Andrea Helgadóttir – artwork (skin colours)
- Inez van Lamsweerde and Vinoodh Matadin – photography

Choir

The Icelandic Choir

- Anna Hinriksdóttir – alto vocals
- Arngerður María Árnadóttir – alto vocals
- Aðalheiður Þorsteinsdóttir – alto vocals
- Guðrún Edda Gunnarsdóttir – alto vocals
- Guðrún Finnbjarnardóttir – alto vocals
- Jónína Guðrún Kristinsdóttir – alto vocals
- Benedikt Ingólfsson – bass vocals
- Hafsteinn Þórólfsson – bass vocals
- Hjálmar Pétursson – bass vocals
- Örn Arnarson – bass vocals
- Þorvaldur Þorvaldsson – bass vocals
- Elfa Ingvadóttir – soprano vocals
- Hera Björk Þórhallsdóttir – soprano vocals
- Hugrún Hólmgeirsdóttir – soprano vocals
- Kristín Erna Blöndal – soprano vocals
- Björn Thorarensen – tenor vocals
- Guðmundur Vignir Karlsson – tenor vocals
- Gísli Magna – tenor vocals
- Þorbjörn Sigurðsson – tenor vocals

The London Choir

- Ann de Renais
- Emma Brain-Gabbot
- Heather Chirncross
- Helen Hampton, Helen Pakker
- Jacqueline Barron
- Janet Mooney
- Jenny O'Grady
- Judith Sim
- Karen Woodhowe
- Kim Chandler
- Melanie Marshall
- Micaela Haslam
- Nicki Kennedy
- Rachel Chapman
- Samantha Shaw
- Sarah Eyden
- Sarah Simmondi
- Tarsha Colt
- Yona Dunsford

== Charts ==
=== Weekly charts ===
Weekly chart performance for Medúlla
Chart (2004)	Peak position
Australian Albums (ARIA)	17
Austrian Albums (Ö3 Austria)	6
Belgian Albums (Ultratop Flanders)	4
Belgian Albums (Ultratop Wallonia)	1
Canadian Albums (Billboard)	6
Czech Albums (ČNS IFPI)	13
Danish Albums (Hitlisten)	2
Dutch Albums (Album Top 100)	20
European Albums (Billboard)	1
Finnish Albums (Suomen virallinen lista)	4
French Albums (SNEP)	1
German Albums (Offizielle Top 100)	5
Greek Albums (IFPI)	9
Icelandic Albums (Tónlist)	1
Irish Albums (IRMA)	22
Italian Albums (FIMI)	2
Japanese Albums (Oricon)	10
New Zealand Albums (RMNZ)	35
Norwegian Albums (VG-lista)	3
Polish Albums (ZPAV)	2
Portuguese Albums (AFP)	5
Scottish Albums (Official Charts)	16
Singaporean Albums (RIAS)	9
Spanish Albums (PROMUSICAE)	6
Swedish Albums (Sverigetopplistan)	7
Swiss Albums (Schweizer Hitparade)	3
UK Albums (Official Charts)	9
UK Independent Albums (Official Charts)	3
US Billboard 200	14
US Top Dance Albums (Billboard)	1

=== Year-end charts ===
Year-end chart performance for Medúlla
Chart (2004)	Position
Belgian Albums (Ultratop Wallonia)	98
French Albums (SNEP)	105

== Certifications and sales ==
Certifications and sales for Medúlla
Region	Certification	Certified units/sales
France (SNEP)	Gold	100,000^{*}
Japan	—	71,239
Russia (NFPF)	Gold	10,000^{*}
United Kingdom (BPI)	Silver	60,000^{^}
United States	—	235,000
^{*} Sales figures based on certification alone.^{^} Shipments figures based on certification alone.
