= CoDex 1962: A Trilogy =

2018 Icelandic novel

Codex 1962: A Trilogy
- Cover of the English first edition
- Author: Sjón
- Translator: Victoria Cribb
- Language: Icelandic, English
- Genres: Romance Mystery Crime Science fiction
- Published: July 26, 2018
- Publisher: MCD
- Publication place: Iceland
- English publication date: September 11, 2018
- Pages: 528
- ISBN: 978-0374125639

CoDex 1962: A Trilogy is a 2018 cross-genre novel written by Icelandic author Sjón. The trilogy is a collection of Sjón’s previously published works from 1994, 2001, and 2016. The book is narrated by protagonist Jósef Loewe, a clay figure animated into a human, and follows the story of his conception and life.

CoDex 1962 is structured into three parts: Thine Eyes Did See My Substance (A Love Story), Iceland’s Thousand Years (A Crime Story), and I’m a Sleeping Door (A Science Fiction Story), encompassing times from the early 20th century to the present day. The book's narration mimics the oral tradition of various folktales and religious texts, taking influence from Icelandic folklore and The Bible, with the narrator often expanding upon the plot by referencing these stories. CoDex 1962 explores themes of nationalism, social injustice, and the Jewish resettlement in Iceland during World War II.

In 2019, CoDex 1962 was longlisted for the Best Translated Book Award.

== Plot ==
=== Part I: Thine Eyes Did See My Substance ===
The book opens in World War II era Germany in the fictional town of Kükenstadt, which translates to “chick city”. Jósef Loewe claims the story of his conception begins here, explaining how Kükenstadt is home to a small chick statue erected in its name and an ex-brothel inn called Gasthof Vrieslander. One day, the owners of the inn are forced to take in and nurse a Jewish refugee, Leo Loewe, back to health. Leo, having just escaped a concentration camp, is nearly dead and only managed to keep one possession: a hatbox of unknown contents. Marie-Sophie, a young maid working at Gasthof Vrieslander, is assigned to care for him in the secret “priest’s room,” which was originally used for high status customers when it was still a brothel. Karl Maus, Marie-Sophie’s boyfriend, discovers that she is caring for a Jew, accuses her of cheating on him, and rapes her in a fit of anger. Distraught, she leaves Gasthof Vrieslander and walks around Kükenstadt to clear her mind. When she returns, Marie-Sophie discovers that Leo was not really unconscious the entire time she cared for him. Leo unveils the contents of his hatbox to Marie-Sophie: living clay. Together, they mold a baby from it.

=== Part II: Iceland's Thousand Years ===
Leo leaves Marie-Sophie in Kükenstadt and flees Germany to Iceland with the inanimate clay baby. On the boat to Iceland, Leo's gold ring, which is a vital component to bringing the clay baby to life, is stolen. In Iceland, Leo becomes acquainted with stamp dealer Hrafn W. Karlsson and is convinced by him to gain Icelandic citizenship to remain in the country and avoid severe punishment for illegal stamp dealing as a foreigner. At a meeting with Hrafn, Leo realizes that the capping on his wisdom tooth is made from the gold of his stolen ring. Leo is granted citizenship but is mistakenly given the Icelandic name Skallagrímur Kveldúlfsson, which means “evening wolf” in Icelandic. The court votes to change his name to Jón Jónsson instead. Leo gathers two of his acquaintances, Anthony Brown and Mikhail Pushkin, and explains his plans and reasons for retrieving his stolen gold. After seeing the clay baby, Pushkin and Anthony are convinced to find Hrafn and his brother Már and aid Leo in taking back the gold. Pushkin finds the whereabouts of the Karlsson brothers. The three first stop at an AA meeting and tranquilize Már as he exits the building, putting him into their car before heading to the Freemason’s Temple. At the temple, they restrain Hrafn and find the tooth is not made from Leo’s gold, but low grade orthodontist gold instead. After putting the brothers in their car, Már transforms into a werewolf and shows his tooth made with Leo’s gold, revealing that the tooth the men pulled previously was actually Már’s, and that the two brothers had switched appearances. No longer disguised, Hrafn runs away, and Leo, Pushkin and Anthony follow him and retrieve the gold tooth. Leo molds the gold into a ring and presses it into the clay baby, finally bringing him to life in the year 1962.

=== Part III: I'm a Sleeping Door ===
This part begins with a series of nuclear explosions that genetically mutate all the children born in Iceland in 1962. A genomics biotech company called CoDex starts to interview people who were affected by this event. CoDex also gains access to all of Iceland’s medical records in order to create a database of Icelandic genetic information to accelerate developments in medicine. The story alternates between a now adult Jósef Loewe telling his life story, other adults born in 1962 telling their stories, and updated lists of the death days of every Icelandic person born in 1962. Jósef, born in 1962, is one of the many subjects being interviewed; he suffers from Stone Man Syndrome, a disease that turns his soft tissue into bone. He also has the ability to recount vivid memories from the exact date and time they occurred in the past. Through these interviews, Jósef’s true coming to being is revealed. Long after Jósef's interview is completed, CoDex begins a new project to decipher the minds and languages of animals to better understand humanity’s impact on the environment. This results in the creation of a super software called Andria(S) that communicates directly with animals. Eventually, they become self aware. Teaming up with the animals, the software Andria(S) uses humanity’s own methods of war to eliminate the human race. The earth reverts to a pre-human state. Most human records have been destroyed, but the story of Jósef Loewe remains intact.

== Characters ==
Jósef Loewe is the narrator of the entire novel, although he doesn't become the protagonist until I'm a Sleeping Door. He was made from clay by Leo Loewe and Sophie-Marie in the 1940s, but was not completed and brought to life until 1962.

Leo Loewe is an alchemist and Jewish refugee who escaped a Nazi concentration camp during World War II. He is also known as Jón Jónsson after he moves to Iceland and gains Icelandic citizenship. He is the father and creator of Jósef Loewe.

Marie Sophie is the housemaid who cared for Leo Loewe during his time in refuge at Gasthof Vrieslander. She accompanied Leo in bringing his clay child to life and is the mother of Jósef Loewe.

Hrafn W. Karlsson is a Freemason and stamp dealer in Iceland who stole Leo Loewe's gold that was needed to bring Jósef Loewe to life. He is the brother of Már C. Karlsson.

Már C. Karlsson is a parliamentary attendant and an alcoholic who stole Leo Loewe's gold. He is the brother of Hrafn W. Karlsson.

Anthony Brown is an African American theologian and wrestler and working at the University of Iceland. He and Mikhail Pushkin help Leo Loewe bring the clay baby to life.

Mikhail Pushkin is a Soviet spy stationed in Iceland. He and Anthony Brown help Leo Loewe bring the clay baby to life.

Aleta Szelińska works for biotechechnology company CoDex and is assigned to interview Jósef Loewe.

== Background ==
Sjón took an interest in Icelandic folklore at a young age, noting the "stark realism of those stories" to be an influence on his writing. Combining this with the surrealist tones of Mikhail Bulgakov and Bruno Shulz, Sjón desired to create a story that tested his ability as a writer. In 1992, he began writing a story taking place in modern day Reykjavik, but wishing to expand upon Jósef's backstory, Sjón wrote and published what would become Thine Eyes Did See My Substance. After moving to London with his family, Sjón paused work on the trilogy until moving back to Iceland in 1997, where he completed Iceland's Thousand Years, which served as a connection between his original conception and published novel in 1992. Sjón again stopped work on the project, looking to pursue shorter works, and after gaining success with his 2003 novel The Blue Fox, he decided to continue independent projects until completing the final part of the trilogy in 2016.

Sjón's interest in folklore influenced the oral narrative of the book, stating the supernatural nature of Jósef's story required the style's dynamic between audience and speaker. He further explored the Jewish myth of The Golem of Prague after reading The Golem by Gustav Meyrink, which served as the basis for Jósef's character. Sjón notes his attraction to synthesizing Icelandic and foreign lore as a fundamental part of CoDex 1962, stating that after visiting the grave of Judah Loew ben Bezalel in 1990, he was inspired to "bring the golem into Icelandic literature."

The author would later be guided by his interest in other cultures to explore in the Jewish migration to Iceland after World War II, attributing a biography of a Jewish refugee in Iceland as the cornerstone for Leo's own migration in CoDex 1962.

== Critical reception ==
CoDex 1962 was well received by critics, who noted the unique narrative style, incorporation of folklore, and fusion of various genres as an intriguing appeal of the book. The trilogy mixes elements of Surrealism with ancient folklore and modern pop culture to create a unique narrative. World Literature Today commended Sjón's ability to combine these expansive elements through "sheer authorial force of will." CoDex 1962 has been described as "noble descendant" to The Master and the Margarita and has been compared to the satirical delivery of The Tin Drum and Tristram Shandy.

Translator Victoria Cribb has also been praised for effectively communicating Sjon's distinct narrative voice into English.

== See also ==
- Icelandic Literature
