= Sjón =

Icelandic writer (born 1962)

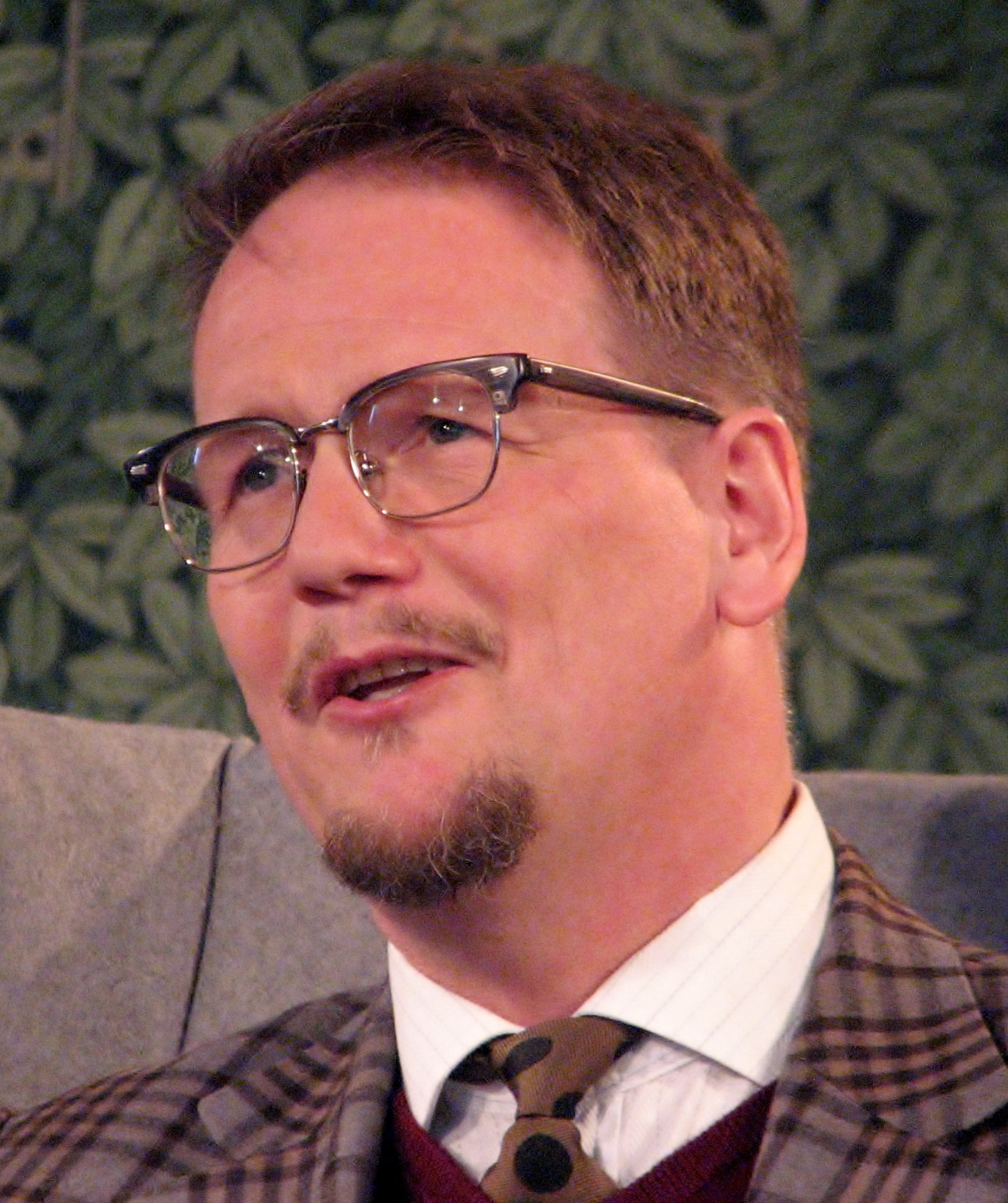
- Sjón in 2014
- Born: Sigurjón Birgir Sigurðsson; 27 August 1962 (age 64); Reykjavík, Iceland
- Occupations: Poet; Novelist; Lyricist
- Writing career
- Language: Icelandic
- Genres: Fiction; Surrealism
- Notable works: The Blue Fox (2003); From the Mouth of the Whale (2008) "I've Seen It All" (2000)

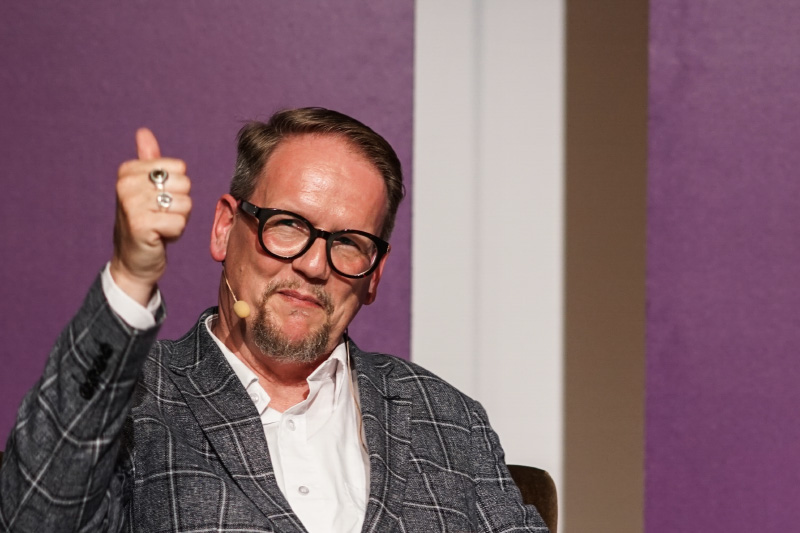
Sjón at LiteratureXchange Festival ín Aarhus (Denmark 2019)

Sigurjón Birgir Sigurðsson (born 27 August 1962), known as Sjón (/ʃoʊn/ SHOHN; Icelandic: [sjouːn]; meaning "sight" and being an abbreviation of his first name), is an Icelandic poet, novelist, lyricist, and screenwriter. Sjón frequently collaborates with the singer Björk and has performed with the Sugarcubes as Johnny Triumph. His works have been translated into 30 languages.

== Early life ==
Born in Reykjavík, Iceland, Sjón grew up in the city's Breiðholt district, where he lived with his mother. He began his writing career early and published his first book of poetry, Sýnir (Visions), in 1978 at 16.

In his youth, Sjón read and was influenced by the Hardy Boys, Nancy Drew, Enid Blyton, and Henri Vernes. Later, he described David Bowie as being "like a tutor to me" because he would explore all the bands, authors, and artists that Bowie mentioned in interviews. He spent his teenage years following the cultural scenes in New York and London, and he took special interest in the emergence of punk subculture. "When you’re on an island up in the North Atlantic," he said, "the need to know what is going on in the cultural centers is very strong, and you do everything you can to feel part of it all."

== Career ==
He was one of the founding members of the neo-surrealist group Medúsa and became significant in Reykjavik's cultural scene.

Active on the Icelandic music scene since the early 1980s, Sjón has collaborated with many of the best-known artists of the era and was featured as guest vocalist on a rare Sugarcubes 12" single "Luftgitar" in 1987 using the name Johnny Triumph; this was accompanied by a music video of Sjón playing air guitar with Björk and Einar Örn Benediktsson. Sjón would occasionally reprise this role for the final encore of the Sugarcubes concerts, including the band's one-off 2006 reunion show in Reykjavík.

Sjón has described rowdy and exuberant events from his youthful era, including a night spent walking around Reykjavik entirely on the roofs of parked cars that ended with him lying face down in a police car reciting from memory André Breton's Surrealist Manifesto of 1924.

=== Björk ===
Sjón and Björk first met when they were teenagers, and together they formed a two-person band called Rocka Rocka Drum. Later, when Björk began her solo career in the 1990s, Sjón wrote lyrics for her. The pair teamed up to write the song "I've Seen it All" for the film Dancer in the Dark in 2000, and as a result, Sjón and Björk shared nominations for "Best Original Song" at both the 2001 Golden Globes and the 2001 Academy Awards. Two years later, Sjón was featured in the documentary Inside Björk. In 2004, Björk performed "Oceania" – a song that the two had written together – at the 2004 Summer Olympics Opening Ceremony in Athens, Greece.

=== Writing ===
In 2007, he contributed the original story and wrote the screenplay for the animated film Anna and the Moods. He also joined the cast, voicing the character Dr. Artmann.

Sjón co-wrote the feature Lamb together with Valdimar Jóhannsson. Lamb premiered in 2021 and was selected as Iceland's contribution to the 2022 Academy Awards. Lamb also received a lot of international recognition through festivals around the world. It has been nominated for or received prizes at the Cannes Film Festival, Gothenburg Film Festival, Sitges Film Festival, Palm Springs International Film Festival, and Athens International Film Festival, as well as from the Edda Awards and the Austin Film Critics Association Awards.

From August to December 2021, Sjón was writer-in-residence at the Literaturhaus Zurich and the PWG Foundation in Zurich.

Sjón co-wrote the 2022 film The Northman, a historical epic and revenge thriller based on the legend of the Viking prince Amleth, with director Robert Eggers. Björk appears in the film in a supporting role as a seeress.

His writing is characterized by surrealist elements, like unexpected transformations, strange events, and a blurring of boundaries between humans and other animals. His work has received critical acclaim and been praised by other novelists such as Hari Kunzru, David Mitchell, and A.S. Byatt, who said that his writing "changes the whole map of literature inside [her] head." Sjón has discussed how, to some extent, his writing is influenced by the nature of Iceland itself as a remote, cold, volcanic island that experiences frequent tectonic activity. "We’re absolutely at the mercy of these magnificent things, the land with its volcanoes and earthquakes, and the sea, which surrounds us and can be either a friend or a monster that devours us," he has commented about his relationship to the land. "As a writer, I love metamorphosis. I think it’s one of the great tools of literature."

He writes in Icelandic.

== Personal life ==
Sjón has lived and worked in London, but he currently resides in central Reykjavík with his wife, Ásgerdur. He has two adult children. He does most of his writing in an old fisherman's cottage in Reykjavik. Hanging on the wall inside are the rib and shoulder blade of a large whale that once beached and died a short walk away from the cottage. "If you're here," Sjón says of his writing cottage, "then you're in the belly of the whale."

When Sjón was a teenager, he learned that his grandfather had lived in Germany during World War II and worked as a Nazi spy. After returning to Iceland on a U-boat in 1944, his grandfather was arrested, convicted of treason, and imprisoned for a year. That family history has influenced Sjón's writing, including his 2019 novel Red Milk that explores the neo-Nazi radicalization of an Icelandic youth.

He has been outspoken against the co-option of traditional Nordic culture and literature by right-wing and nationalist political actors. Pushing back against Icelandic critics of multiculturalism, Sjón has said that "like everywhere, the hilarious is that the conservative people trying to keep everyone out haven't the first clue what Icelandic culture is made of. Because they’ve never read a book or embraced Icelandic art, and they don’t realize that Icelandic culture is really a hybrid. It has always been." As small immigrant communities have grown in Iceland, he has been an advocate for redefining Icelandic literature to include works written on the island in other languages like Polish, Spanish, and English.

== Works ==
=== Novels ===
- Night of Steel ("Stálnótt", Mál og menning, 1987)
- Angel, Stovehat and Strawberries ("Engill, pípuhattur og jarðarber", Mál og menning, 1989)
- Night of the Lemon (Greyhound Press, 1993)
- Under the wings of the Valkyrie (1994 in Icelandic, Isolarii in English 2023)
- Made in Secret / Your Eyes Saw Me ("Augu þín sáu mig", Mál og menning, 1994)
- The Story of the Great Cap ("Sagan af húfunni fínu", Mál og menning, 1995)
- Númi and his Seven Heads ("Númi og höfuðin sjö", Mál og menning, 2000)
- With a Quivering Tear ("Með titrandi tár", Mál og menning, 2001)
- The Story of the Strange Bird ("Sagan af furðufugli", Mál og menning, 2002)
- The Blue Fox ("Skugga-Baldur", Bjartur, 2003)
- The Whispering Muse / The Splinter from Argo ("Argóarflísin", Bjartur, 2005)
- From the Mouth of the Whale / The Marvels of Twilight ("Rökkurbýsnir", Bjartur, 2008)
- Moonstone – The Boy Who Never Was ("Mánasteinn – drengurinn sem aldrei var til", JPV/Forlagið, 2013)
- CoDex 1962 (JPV/Forlagið, 2016)
- Red Milk ("Korngult hár, grá augu", JPV/útgáfa, 2019)

=== Poetry ===
- Visions ("Sýnir", 1978)
- Madonna (1979)
- Birgitta (Medúsa, 1979)
- How Does One Make Love to Hands? (with Matthías Sigurður Magnússon) ("Hvernig elskar maður hendur?", Medúsa, 1981)
- The Blind Man's Bicycle ("Reiðhjól blinda mannsins", 1982)
- The Book of Illusions ("Sjónhverfingabókin", Medúsa, 1983)
- Oh, Isn't it Wild? (Medúsa, 1985)
- Toy Castles ... ("Leikfangakastalar", Medúsa, 1986)
- The Boy with the X-Ray Eyes, poems from 1978 to 1986 ("Drengurinn með röntgenaugun", Mál og menning, 1986)
- there is something I can't remember about the clouds ("Ég man ekki eitthvað um skýin", Mál og menning, 1991)
- obscure figures ("myrkar fígúrur", Mál og menning, 1998)
- the song of the stone collector ("söngur steinasafnarans", Bjartur, 2007)
- Collected Poems 1978–2008 ("Ljóðasafn 1978–2008", Bjartur, 2008)

=== Stage ===
- "Shadow Play" ("Skuggaleikur") - a libretto based on the short story "Skyggen" by H. C. Andersen - Strengjaleikhúsið - Reykjavík 2006
- "Gargoyles" ("Ufsagrýlur") - a play - Lab Loki theatre troupe - Reykjavík 2010
- "Tales from a Sea Journey" - a play written in collaboration with the theatre group - New International Encounter - Oslo 2011
- "The Motion Demon" - a libretto based on the short stories of Stefan Grabinski - Figura Ensemble - Copenhagen 2011
- "Red Waters" - a libretto co-written with Keren Ann and Barði Jóhannsson - CDN Orleans - Rouen 2011
- "Hvörf" - a play co-written with Lab Loki theatre troupe - The National Theatre - Reykjavík 2013
- "Folie à Deux" - a libretto in six songs created with composer Emily Hall for opera company - Mahogany Opera Group - premiered Bergen 2015
- "Seven Stones" - a libretto for an opera co-written with Ondřej Adámek, directed and choreographed by Éric Oberdorff - Théâtre du Jeu de Paume - Aix-en-Provence 2018

=== Collaborations with Björk ===
- "Isobel" on the album Post (1995)
- "Bachelorette" and "Jóga" on the album Homogenic (1997)
- Lyrics for the songs featured in the film Dancer in the Dark and its soundtrack, Selmasongs, written in collaboration with Lars von Trier (2000)
- "Oceania", written for the opening ceremony of the 2004 Summer Olympics and featured on the album Medúlla (2004)
- "Wanderlust" on the album Volta (2007)
- "The Comet Song" featured in the film Moomins and the Comet Chase (2010)
- "Cosmogony", "Virus", and "Solstice" on the album Biophilia (2011)

=== Film ===
- Reykjavik Whale-Watching Massacre (2009) (screenplay and co-writer on screen story)
- Lamb (2021) (co-writer with Valdimar Jóhannsson)
- The Northman (2022) (co-writer with Robert Eggers)
- Werwulf (2026) (co-writer with Robert Eggers)
- The Wolf Will Tear Your Immaculate Hands (TBA) (co-writer with Nathalie Álvarez Mesén)

== Awards and honours ==
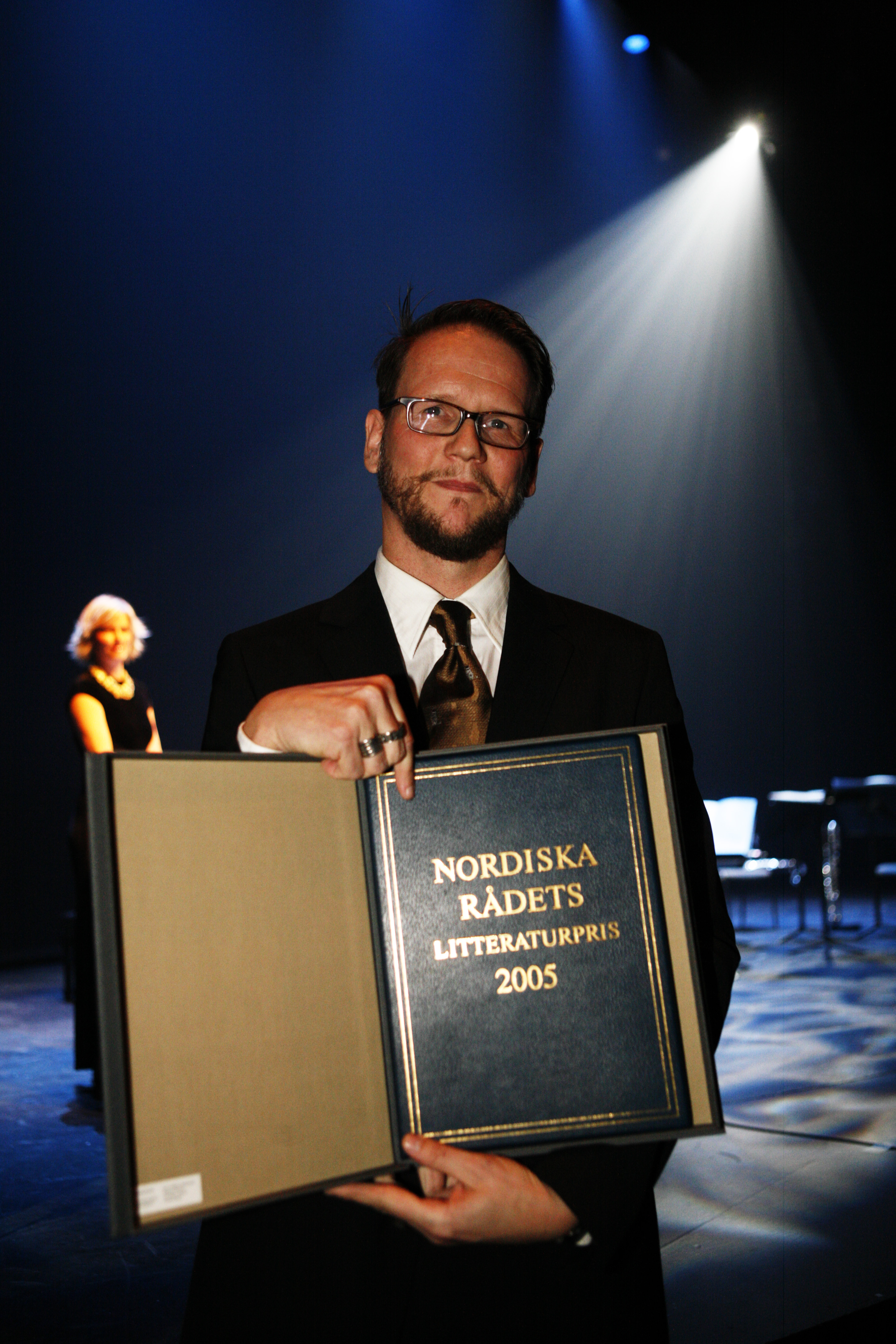
Winner of the Nordic Council Literature Prize 2005

- 1995: DV Newspaper Culture Prize for Literature for Made in Secret
- 1998: Icelandic Broadcasting Service Writers Fund for contribution to Icelandic literature
- 2002: DV Newspaper Culture Prize for Literature for With A Quivering Tear
- 2005: Nordic Council's Literature Prize for The Blue Fox
- 2005: Icelandic Bookseller's Prize for Novel of the Year for The Whispering Muse

Sjón was nominated for an Academy Award and a Golden Globe for the song "I've Seen It All" from the film Dancer in the Dark.

In 2016, Sjón became the third writer chosen to contribute to Future Library.
