= Selma Ježková (opera) =

Opera by Poul Ruders

Selma Ježková is an opera by Poul Ruders based on Lars von Trier's Dancer in the Dark about a Czech immigrant coming to America. Ruders dedicated the role to Ylva Kihlberg, who sang in the premiere. The opera ran for 9 performances at the Copenhagen Opera House from 5 to 27 September 2010. It played at NorrlandsOperan in Sweden and the Lincoln Center Festival in the United States in 2011. It opened the 2015 Munich Opera Festival.

== Recording ==
- Selma Ježková (sung in English) Ylva Kihlberg (Selma), Palle Knudsen (Bill), Hanne Fischer (Kathy), Guido Paevatalu (Norman/Guard 2), Gert Henning-Jensen (District Attorney/Guard 1) & Carl Philip Levin (Gene) The Royal Danish Opera & The Royal Danish Orchestra, Michael Schønwandt DVD
