= From the Mouth of the Whale =

2008 novel by Sjón

- Author: Sjón
- Original title: Rökkurbýsnir
- Translator: Victoria Cribb
- Language: Icelandic
- Genre: Historical novel (Reformation)
- Publisher: Bjartur
- Publication date: 2008
- Publication place: Iceland
- English publication date: 2011
- Pages: 239
- ISBN: 9789979657477

From the Mouth of the Whale (Icelandic: Rökkurbýsnir, lit. 'twilight portents', kenning for ‘dusk business’ or what has been left unfinished by the transition to darkness) is a 2008 novel by the Icelandic writer Sjón. The English translation was shortlisted for the 2012 Independent Foreign Fiction Prize. and the 2013 International Dublin Literary Award.

== See also ==
- 2008 in literature
- Icelandic literature
