= Dancer in the Dark =

2000 film by Lars von Trier

- Theatrical release poster
- Directed by: Lars von Trier
- Written by: Lars von Trier
- Produced by: Vibeke Windeløv
- Starring: Björk; Catherine Deneuve; David Morse; Peter Stormare; Joel Grey
- Cinematography: Robby Müller
- Edited by: François Gédigier; Molly Marlene Stensgård
- Music by: Björk
- Production companies: Zentropa Entertainments; Canal+; FilmFour; France 3 Cinéma
- Distributed by: Angel Films (Denmark); Les Films du Losange (France); Constantin Film (Germany); Istituto Luce (Italy); Sandrew Metronome (Sweden); FilmFour Distributors (United Kingdom); Fine Line Features (United States)
- Release dates: 17 May 2000 (Cannes); 1 September 2000 (Denmark previews); 8 September 2000 (Scandinavia)
- Running time: 140 minutes
- Countries: Denmark; France; Germany; Italy; Sweden; United Kingdom; United States
- Language: English
- Budget: US$12.5 million (120 million kr)
- Box office: US$45.6 million (416 million kr)

Dancer in the Dark is a 2000 psychological tragedy musical film written and directed by Lars von Trier. It stars Icelandic musician Björk as a factory worker who has a degenerative eye condition and is saving for an operation to prevent her young son from suffering the same fate. Catherine Deneuve, David Morse, Cara Seymour, Peter Stormare, Siobhan Fallon Hogan and Joel Grey also star. The soundtrack, Selmasongs, was written mainly by Björk, with contributions from Mark Bell and some lyrics were written by Trier and Sjón.

Dancer in the Dark is the final installment in Trier's second trilogy, "Golden Heart", following Breaking the Waves (1996) and The Idiots (1998). It was an international co-production among companies based in thirteen European and North American countries and regions. Like the first installment, it was shot with a handheld camera inspired by Dogme 95.

Dancer in the Dark premiered at the 2000 Cannes Film Festival and won the Palme d'Or, along with the Best Actress Award for Björk. It received generally positive reviews, with Björk's performance being widely praised.

The song "I've Seen It All", performed and co-written by Björk, with Sjón and Trier, was nominated for an Academy Award for Best Original Song, but lost to "Things Have Changed" by Bob Dylan from Wonder Boys.

== Plot ==
In Washington State in 1964, Selma Ježková, a Czech immigrant, has moved to the United States with her 12-year-old son Gene Ježek. They live a life of poverty as Selma works at a factory with her good friend Kathy, whom she nicknames Cvalda. She rents a trailer home on the property of local police officer Bill Houston and his wife, Linda. She is romantically pursued by the shy but persistent Jeff.

Selma is gradually losing her vision due to a degenerative eye condition, but still is saving money to pay for an operation that will prevent Gene from sharing her fate. She also takes part in rehearsals for a production of The Sound of Music and accompanies Kathy to the local cinema, where together they watch Hollywood musicals, as Kathy describes them to her.

In her day-to-day life, Selma slips into daydreams, imagining herself in a musical ("Cvalda"). Jeff and Kathy begin to realize that Selma's vision is worse than they thought, and that she has been memorizing eye charts in order to pass vision tests and keep her job. Bill reveals to Selma that Linda's excessive spending has put the couple's house in danger of foreclosure by their bank. He has contemplated suicide but cannot bring himself to carry out the act. Selma promises to keep his secret and confides in him about her advancing vision loss. Bill pretends to leave, but watches Selma hide her money in a tin.

The next day, Selma's boss Norman believes that her eye condition has deteriorated; he accepts her resignation and pays her final wages, but promises to re-hire her once her sight has improved. However, Kathy accuses him of firing her. Not willing to get her job back, she walks home along a railroad bridge and turns down Jeff's offer to drive her there ("I've Seen It All"). Opening the tin to add her money to it, Selma finds it empty. Realizing that Bill has robbed her, she goes to his house to confront him. Linda accuses Selma of trying to seduce her husband, explaining that Bill told her Selma wanted him for his money. Not wanting to reveal her knowledge of the impending foreclosure, Selma ignores Linda and confronts Bill about the theft. They fight over the money, with Bill drawing a gun only to be accidentally shot by Selma.

Bill yells for Linda to call the police, saying that Selma has tried to rob him, then begs Selma to kill him, telling her it is the only way she will ever reclaim her stolen money. Selma shoots Bill several times, but only wounds him further due to her poor vision, and finally beats him to death with her safe deposit box once the gun runs out of ammunition. She imagines that Bill's corpse stands up and slow dances with her, and he and Linda absolve her of blame and tell her she just did what she had to do ("Smith and Wesson"). Taking her money back, she flees the house and pays for Gene's operation in advance.

Not knowing about the murder, Jeff takes Selma to rehearsal, where her director calls the police to have her arrested ("In the Musicals, Part 1"). In court, she is accused of being a Communist sympathizer and of pretending to be blind to exploit the American healthcare system. Although she tells as much truth about the situation as she can, she refuses to reveal Bill's secret, saying that she had promised not to, even though revealing the secret could help to clear her name. When her claim of sending all her money to her father, Oldřich Nový, is proven false, she is convicted of murder and sentenced to death ("In the Musicals, Part 2"). Kathy and Jeff eventually figure out what happened and recover Selma's money, using it instead to pay for a trial lawyer who can free her. Selma refuses the lawyer, opting to face execution by hanging rather than let her son go blind, but she is deeply distraught as she awaits her death ("107 Steps"). As Selma reaches the gallows, she begins to panic and the guards strap her to a board. Kathy runs in with news that the operation has saved Gene's vision and gives his glasses to Selma. Relieved, Selma sings one final song on the gallows with no musical accompaniment, but is hanged before she can finish the last verse; the final lines are displayed as the proceedings conclude ("Next to Last Song").

== Cast ==
- Björk as Selma Ježková
- Catherine Deneuve as Kathy (Cvalda)
- David Morse as Bill Houston
- Peter Stormare as Jeff
- Joel Grey as Oldřich Nový
- Cara Seymour as Linda Houston
- Vladica Kostic as Gene Ježek
- Jean-Marc Barr as Norman
- Vincent Paterson as Samuel
- Siobhan Fallon as Brenda
- Željko Ivanek as District attorney
- Udo Kier as Dr. Pokorný
- Jens Albinus as Morty
- Reathel Bean as Judge
- Michael Flessas as Angry man
- Mette Berggreen as Receptionist
- Lars Michael Dinesen as Defense attorney
- Katrine Falkenberg as Suzan
- Stellan Skarsgård as the doctor

== Production ==
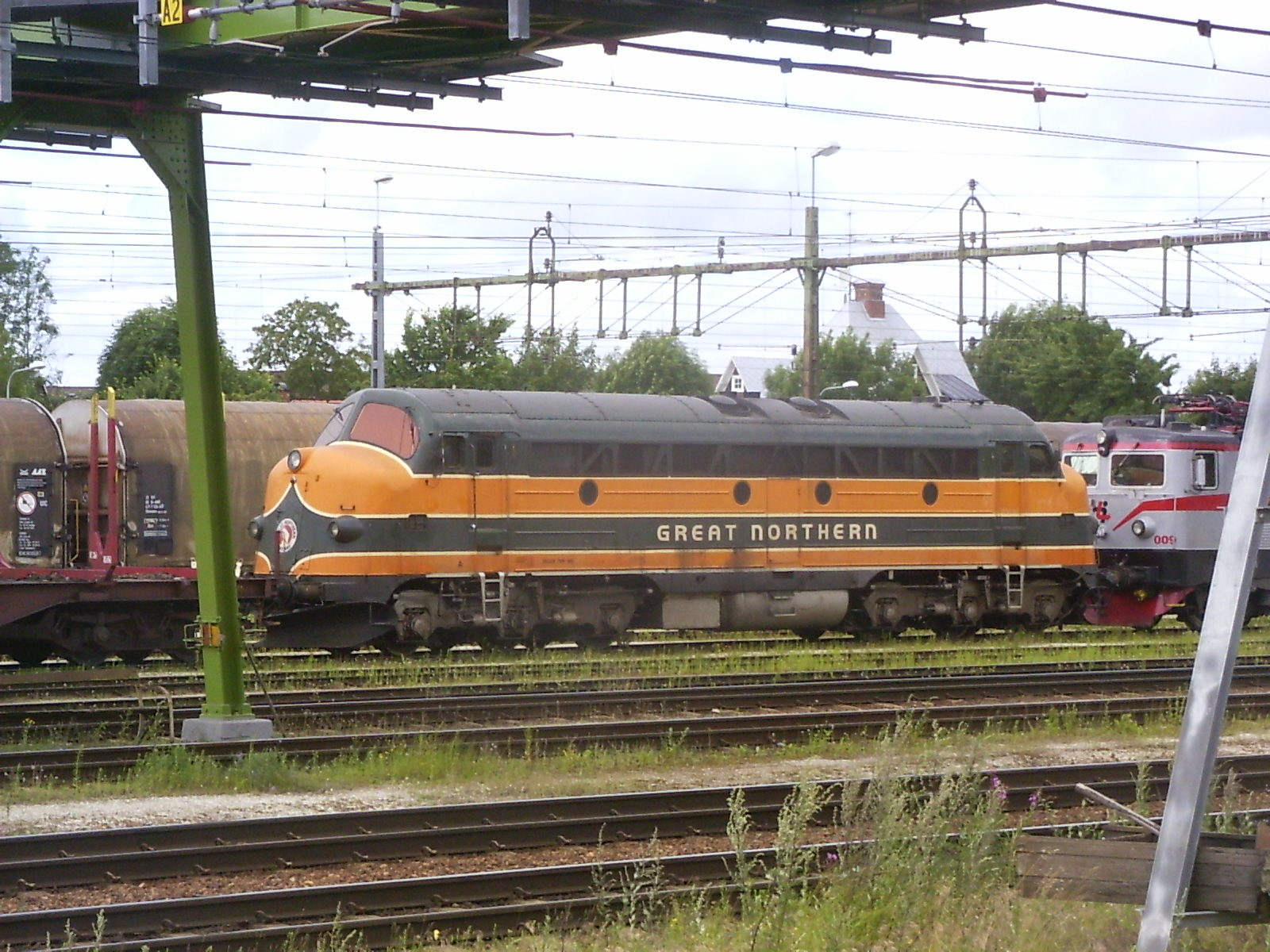
The Great Northern TMY locomotive

The Icelandic singer Björk had almost never acted before, having only had sparse acting roles including Broken Glass (1988), a made-for-tv Icelandic horror film, and The Juniper Tree (1990), an independent fantasy film. She described the filmmaking process for this particular film as so emotionally taxing that she did not want to act again, as this film traumatized her and ruined film acting for her. However, she eventually appeared in Drawing Restraint 9 (2005) and The Northman (2022). Trier, Deneuve, and others have described her performance as "feeling" rather than acting. Björk, not having been trained as an actress, didn’t use traditional methods to depict Selma’s anguish and despair. According to behind-the-scenes anecdotes and interviews, her emotions onscreen are real, sourced from her miserable time working with Trier. Björk later clarified that she was not necessarily put off acting by the film, rather that she never wanted to be an actress at all but made an exception for Trier, who had pressured her to act in the film, having spent a year trying to convince her, as he was adamant that the composer of the film should also play the main character Selma. What changed Björk’s mind was when she realized that the album, Selmasongs, was main character Selma Jezkova’s heartbeat, and that if a different Hollywood actress had played her, she would have misunderstood her, prompting Björk to finally accept the role to protect her music and the character.

The musical sequences were filmed simultaneously with over 100 digital cameras so that multiple angles of the performance could be captured and cut together later, thus shortening the filming schedule. A Danish MY class locomotive and one T43 (#107) (both owned by Swedish train operator TÅGAB) were painted in the American Great Northern scheme for the film, and not repainted afterward.

=== Music ===
Selmasongs: Music from the Motion Picture Soundtrack 'Dancer in the Dark' is the first soundtrack album by Icelandic musician Björk. It was released on September 18, 2000, by One Little Indian Records to promote and accompany the film Dancer in the Dark. In the film, Björk starred as Selma Ježková, a Czech immigrant who has moved to the United States. The album features classical arrangements, as well as melodies and beats composed of sounds from mundane objects, such as factory machines and trains.

Notably, some songs on the album have lyrics that are substantially different from their lyrics in the film, the most pronounced example being "Scatterheart". The album omits the vocals of actors David Morse, Cara Seymour and Vladica Kostic. Some lyrics were rewritten, perhaps to prevent spoiling crucial plot details, since the soundtrack was released in stores before the movie opened in theaters, or to make the record flow better as a stand-alone album. In particular, on the song "I've Seen It All", Thom Yorke performs the words sung by Peter Stormare in the film. In addition, the tracks "My Favourite Things" and the original "Next to Last Song" do not appear on the album at all, despite appearances in the film.

The track "I've Seen It All" was nominated for an Academy Award for Best Original Song, and was released as a promotional single in 2000. For the track, Björk made a "webeo" with director Floria Sigismondi that premiered on September 1, 2000, on MTV.com. It used a shorter version of the song that the singer recorded specifically for the webeo.

- Original music: Björk
- Singers: Björk, Catherine Deneuve, Siobhan Fallon, David Morse, Cara Seymour, Edward Ross (for Vladica Kostic), Joel Grey, Peter Stormare (In the soundtrack Selmasongs, Thom Yorke sings instead of Stormare)
- Lyrics: Björk, Lars von Trier and Sjón
- Non-original music: Richard Rodgers (from The Sound of Music)
- Non-original lyrics: Oscar Hammerstein II (from The Sound of Music)
- Choreographer: Vincent Paterson

== Reception ==
=== Critical response ===
At the review aggregator Rotten Tomatoes, Dancer in the Dark earned positive reviews from 69% of 120 critics, with an average rating of 7.3/10. The critics consensus on the website reads, "Dancer in Dark can be grim, dull, and difficult to watch, but even so, it has a powerful and moving performance from Björk and is something quite new and visionary". According to Metacritic, which assigned the film a weighted average score of 63/100 based on 33 critic reviews, the film received "generally favorable reviews".

On The Movie Show, Margaret Pomeranz gave it five stars while David Stratton gave it a zero, a score shared only by Geoffrey Wright's Romper Stomper (1992). Stratton later described it as his favourite horror film. Peter Bradshaw of The Guardian dubbed Dancer in the Dark the "most shallow and crudely manipulative" film of 2000, and in 2009 he described it as "one of the worst films, one of the worst artworks and perhaps one of the worst things in the history of the world".

The film was praised for its stylistic innovations. Roger Ebert of the Chicago Sun-Times wrote: "It smashes down the walls of habit that surround so many movies. It returns to the wellsprings. It is a bold, reckless gesture". Edward Guthmann from the San Francisco Chronicle wrote: "It's great to see a movie so courageous and affecting, so committed to its own differentness". However, criticism was directed at its storyline. Jonathan Foreman of the New York Post described the film as "meretricious fakery" and called it "so unrelenting in its manipulative sentimentality that, if it had been made by an American and shot in a more conventional manner, it would be seen as a bad joke". Fiachra Gibbons, writing for The Guardian, considered the film to be "the most unusual, extraordinary feel-good musical ever made".

In 2016, David Ehrlich named Dancer in the Dark one of the best films of the 21st century, hailing Björk's performance as the "single greatest feat of film acting" since 2000. Björk's performance is also ranked in the "25 Best Performances Not Nominated for an Oscar of the 21st Century" list. Mia Goth credited the performance as one of her main influences, dubbing it "perfect" and "faultless".

=== Box office ===
The film previewed on 12 screens in Denmark where it grossed 1,562,965 Danish krone ($180,223). It officially opened in Scandinavia on 8 September 2000 where it grossed a disappointing $288,723 in its opening weekend. It grossed $103,102 (kr. 0.9 million) from 49 screens in Denmark, finishing in second place behind X-Men. In Sweden, it opened in fifth place with a gross of 928,621 Swedish krona ($96,330) from 34 screens. It also opened in fifth place in Norway with a gross of 587,495 Norwegian krone ($63,858). In Finland, it came sixth with a gross of 152,598 Finnish markka ($25,433) from six screens. Overall, it grossed $45.6 million worldwide, including $4.2 million in the United States and Canada. It was number one at the Japanese box office for three weeks.

=== Accolades ===
Dancer in the Dark premiered at the 2000 Cannes Film Festival and was awarded the Palme d'Or, along with the Best Actress award for Björk. The song "I've Seen It All" was nominated for an Academy Award for Best Original Song, at the performance of which Björk wore her famous swan dress.

Sight & Sound conducts a poll every ten years of the world's finest film directors to find out the ten greatest films. This poll has been going since 1952, and has become the most recognised poll of its kind in the world. In 2012, Cyrus Frisch was one of the four directors who voted for Dancer in the Dark. Frisch commented: "A superbly imaginative film that leaves conformity in shambles". The director Oliver Schmitz said it was "relentless, claustrophobic, the best movie about capital punishment as far as I'm concerned".

In 2025, Dancer in the Dark was one of the films voted for the "Readers' Choice" edition of The New York Times' list of "The 100 Best Movies of the 21st Century," finishing at number 218.

Award	Date of ceremony	Category	Recipient(s)	Result	Ref(s)
Academy Awards	25 March 2001	Best Original Song	"I've Seen It All" – Björk, Lars von Trier, Sjón	Nominated	
Bodil Awards	4 March 2001	Best Danish Film	Lars von Trier	Nominated	
Bodil Awards	4 March 2001	Best Actress	Björk	Won	
Brit Awards	26 February 2001	Soundtrack/Cast Recording	Björk	Nominated	
Cannes Film Festival	May 2000	Palme d'Or	Lars von Trier	Won	
Cannes Film Festival	May 2000	Best Actress	Björk	Won	
César Awards	24 February 2001	Best Foreign Film	Lars von Trier	Nominated	
Chicago Film Critics Association Awards	26 February 2001	Best Actress	Björk	Nominated	
Chicago Film Critics Association Awards	26 February 2001	Most Promising Actress	Björk	Nominated	
Chicago Film Critics Association Awards	26 February 2001	Best Original Score	Björk	Nominated	
European Film Awards	2 December 2000	Best Film	Lars von Trier	Won	
European Film Awards	2 December 2000	Best Actress	Björk	Won	
European Film Awards	2 December 2000	Best Director – People's Choice	Lars von Trier	Won	
European Film Awards	2 December 2000	Best Actress – People's Choice	Björk	Won	
Golden Globes	21 January 2001	Best Actress in a Motion Picture – Drama	Björk	Nominated	
Golden Globes	21 January 2001	Best Original Song	"I've Seen It All" – Björk, Lars von Trier, Sjón	Nominated	
Goya Awards	3 February 2001	Best European Film	Lars von Trier	Won	
Grammy Awards	21 February 2001	Best Pop Instrumental Performance	Björk – "Overture"	Nominated	
Grammy Awards	21 February 2001	Best Pop Instrumental Arrangement Accompanying A Vocalist(s)	Björk – "I've Seen It All"	Nominated	
Independent Spirit Awards	March 2001	Best Foreign Film	Lars von Trier	Won	
Japan Academy Film Prize	9 March 2001	Outstanding Foreign Language Film	Lars von Trier	Won	
Los Angeles Film Critics Association Awards	December 2000	Best Music Score	Björk	Runner-up	
National Board of Review Awards	16 January 2001	Outstanding Dramatic Music Performance	Björk	Won	
New York Film Critics Circle Awards	14 January 2001	Best Actress	Björk	Runner-up	
Robert Awards	4 February 2001	Best Director	Lars von Trier	Nominated	
Robert Awards	4 February 2001	Best Actress in a Leading Role	Björk	Won	
Robert Awards	4 February 2001	Best Production Design	Karl Juliusson	Won	
Robert Awards	4 February 2001	Best Sound Design	Per Streit	Won	
Robert Awards	4 February 2001	Best Editing	Molly Marlene Steensgaard & Francois Gedigier	Won	
Robert Awards	4 February 2001	Best Score	Björk & Mark Bell	Won	
Satellite Awards	14 January 2001	Best Actress – Motion Picture Drama	Björk	Nominated	
Satellite Awards	14 January 2001	Best Original Song	Björk – "I've Seen It All"	Won	

== See also ==
- The opera Selma Ježková by Poul Ruders, which is based on the film.
