= Who Is It (Björk song) =

Single by Björk

from the album Medúlla
- B-side: "Oceania"
- Released: 18 October 2004
- Genre: A cappella; avant-pop
- Length: 4:09
- Label: One Little Indian
- Songwriter: Björk
- Producer: Björk

Björk singles chronology
"It's in Our Hands" (2002)	"Who Is It" (2004)	"Triumph of a Heart" (2005)

Music video
- "Who Is It" on YouTube

"Who Is It" (sometimes "Who Is It (Carry My Joy on the Left, Carry My Pain on the Right)") is a song recorded by Icelandic singer Björk for her fifth studio album Medúlla. It was released as the lead single from the album on 18 October 2004 by One Little Indian Records. Björk wrote "Who Is It" during the recording sessions for her previous album, Vespertine (2001), when it was known as "Embrace Fortress"; she left it off the album it as she felt it came from "a different family". The final version features throat singer Tanya Tagaq and beatboxer Rahzel, and lyrics reflecting the dialogue between mother and child.

Critics praised "Who Is It" as exuberant and catchy. It peaked in the top five on the single charts in Spain and reached the top 30 in Italy and the United Kingdom. The music video was directed by Dawn Shadforth and shot outdoors in Iceland, and features Björk in a bell-shaped dress designed by Alexander McQueen. During the promotional campaign for Medúlla, Björk performed the song on a number of occasions, such as Friday Night with Jonathan Ross and L'Album de la semaine. She performed it on subsequent tours. It has been covered by Bon Iver and Kurt Elling.

== Background ==
The initial version of "Who Is It" was written with artist Bogdan Raczynski. Björk approached him during a show in London in 2000, and months later, they met in New York and wrote a song titled "Embrace Fortress" during the final recording sessions for her fourth studio album Vespertine (2001). She decided not to put the song on the album, because she felt it was from "a different family"; according to Björk, Vespertine was "introverted and shy and not a very physical record", and she felt this was a physical song that she wrote when she was feeling strong again. Raczynski also said he did not want his version of the song to be available. He said "It was a beautiful thing we did together, but for that reason alone it should be left in the clouds. People need mystery and romance". However, it eventually received a limited vinyl release by Rephlex Records.

Björk then approached the song again during the recording sessions for Medúlla and renamed it as "Who Is It". Electronic music duo Matmos also contributed to the song – they did "fruit-machine-noises" that are in the choruses with synthesizers that she later imitated with her voice. It was also the first song that Rahzel sang, doing the beat in one take. Björk said that after he recorded, "we just all fell on the floor, we couldn't believe it. There's no overdubs, no treatment – this is it. I felt quite proud – if you're gonna have a human beatboxer, at least get the real thing".

== Composition ==
"Who Is It"
A 27-second sample of "Who Is It" featuring Björk singing the chorus.

"Who Is It" features contributions by throat-singer Tanya Tagaq and beatboxer Rahzel. Some lyrics of "Who Is It"—"Who is it that never lets you down?"—may be understood to reflect a "mother's unconditional love" in a dialogue between mother and child. The echo effects in "Who Is It" may additionally reflect the "scattered sense of self the mother may experience as she carries the burden of constant care for her child". Ethan Brown from New York magazine considered the line "Who is it that gave you back your crown?" as a kind of feminist self-validation. According to The Village Voice's Laura Sinagra, the "child-welcoming" song "nods to "world music" warmth with its throat-sung yelps". Pitchfork's Dominique Leone said "Who Is It" reminded him of "Alarm Call" from Homogenic (1997), in the way it "applies Björk's idiosyncratic performances to a traditionally pleasant sounding template", though he felt 'Who Is It' featured a "much more interesting" chord progression during the verses, and an "altogether incredible rhythm track". John Mulvey from Yahoo! Launch noted that the song recalled the "kind of strident hook that Björk favoured during her commercial heyday of the mid-'90s".

== Critical reception ==
"Who Is It" received positive reviews from music critics. Michael Paoletta from Billboard magazine called the song "exuberant", whilst John Mulvey from Yahoo! Launch found it "euphoric". Melanie Haupt commented that Björk's "trills in her native Icelandic work well on "Who Is It," which underscores this disc's experiment in taking the raw power of the human voice". Time Out's John Lewis stated that "Who Is It" has a melody that Cathy Dennis would kill to write. Spence D. of IGN Music said that despite the "strangely haunting" intro, the song was the most "straight forward, accessible number" on the album. Jennifer Vineyard from MTV News shared a similar sentiment, stating that despite its "cumbersome title", it was the "most immediate and catchy number, with a pure sense of seize-the-day joy: If there is to be a single released from the album, this should be it".

The Guardian's Michael Cragg stated that its verses "melt into a big, melodious chorus that showed that despite her disappearance from daytime radio, Björk still knew how to make something resembling a crowd singalong". Matthew Gasteier of Prefix magazine was also positive, calling the song a "mostly typical Bjork anthem", replacing her previous electronic sound with the "concept-appropriate but still conventional human beat". AllMusic's Heather Phares noted that the song, along with promotional single "Oceania", "have an alien quality that is all the stranger considering that nearly all of their source material is human (except for the odd keyboard or two)". Jon Pareles from The New York Times stated that, along with "Where Is the Line", "Who Is It" is a "wide open [song] with complex superstructures, catchy but ghostly, and they probably haven't seen their final incarnation". BBC Music's David Hooper called the song "enjoyable", citing it as one of the only "really immediate tunes" on Medúlla.

== Chart performance ==
In the United Kingdom, "Who Is It" debuted at its peak of number 26 on the UK Singles Chart on the issue dated 24 October 2004. It became her highest-peaking single since "Hidden Place", which reached number 21 in 2001. The song also obtained the same position in Italy, on the issue dated 2 December 2004, but fell to number 40 the next week, before falling off the chart. In France, "Who Is It" debuted at its peak of number 62, before spending two other weeks and falling off the chart.

== Music video ==
Björk in the music video for "Who Is It"

The accompanying music video for "Who Is It" was shot in early September 2004 in Hjörleifshöfði, Iceland and directed by Dawn Shadforth. It premiered at the grand opening of the "Islande de glace et de feu" event at the Palais de la Découverte, in Paris, France, on 27 September 2004. For the video, Björk approached her friend and collaborator Alexander McQueen to design a dress she would wear for it. She asked him for an outfit "that looked like a bell". He then did a brief outline sketch of the shape, and after Björk's approval, it was sent to Iceland for the shoot, with no other discussion or fittings. Their close relationship made Björk feel secure that his dress would work. She accessorised the outfit with leather boots and a mask made from hair.

The video is divided into scenes in the day and night in a desert, with Björk wearing the bell-shaped dress designed by McQueen, dancing playfully to the song. At some moments of the video she can be seen playing bells and holding two Siberian Huskies. Throughout the clip, several children can be seen playing bells and dressed in clothes covered in small jingle bells. The bell choir was formed by Júnia, Salka, Kaktus, Örnólfur, Daði and Gabríel of The Bústaðakirkja Bell Choir. The version of the song played in the video is different from the album version, removing almost all the vocal music and replacing it with bells. The bell-shaped dress was shown in Björk's MoMA retrospective in 2015. It was sold for £44,000, as part of Kerry Taylor Auctions "Passion for Fashion" sale in London, in June 2016.

== Live performances ==
Björk first performed "Who Is It" on the 2001 Vespertine world tour during her stops in Parma and Rome, Italy, in November. During the promotional campaign for Medúlla, a bell choir mix of "Who Is It" was performed with Rahzel and an English bell choir at BBC's Friday Night with Jonathan Ross on 8 October 2004, and at Maida Vale Studios during a set of songs for Gilles Peterson's radio show on BBC Radio 1, two days later. The song was also performed at Canal+'s L'Album de la semaine in France on 15 October, along with other tracks from Medúlla, airing some days later. "Who Is It" has been performed on the Volta tour in 2007 and 2008. Additionally, the "Bell Choir" version was performed using the gameleste on the Biophilia tour.

== Cover versions ==
In 2011, indie band Bon Iver performed a cover version of the song during a concert in Brooklyn, New York and subsequently covered it on an iTunes live session. In 2015, Kurt Elling released a cover version on his album Passion World.

== Formats and track listing ==
European 2-track CD single; UK CD single 1

1. "Who Is It (Carry My Joy on the Left, Carry My Pain on the Right)" (Radio Edit) – 3:04
2. "Oceania" (Radio Mix / Remix featuring Kelis) – 2:55

European and Japanese CD maxi-single

1. "Who Is It (Carry My Joy on the Left, Carry My Pain on the Right)" (C2N Dattasette Mix) – 4:15
2. "Who Is It (Carry My Joy on the Left, Carry My Pain on the Right)" (Fruit Machine Mix) – 3:23
3. "Who Is It (Carry My Joy on the Left, Carry My Pain on the Right)" (Bell Choir Mix featuring The Bústaðakirkja Bell Choir) – 3:49
4. "Oceania" (Radio Mix / Remix featuring Kelis) – 2:55

UK CD single 2

1. "Who Is It (Carry My Joy on the Left, Carry My Pain on the Right)" (C2N Dattasette Mix) – 4:15
2. "Who Is It (Carry My Joy on the Left, Carry My Pain on the Right)" (Fruit Machine Mix) – 3:23
3. "Who Is It (Carry My Joy on the Left, Carry My Pain on the Right)" (Bell Choir Mix featuring The Bústaðakirkja Bell Choir) – 3:49

UK 12-inch vinyl

1. "Who Is It (Carry My Joy on the Left, Carry My Pain on the Right)" Who Is It (Vitalic Mix) – 4:38
2. "Where Is The Line" (Fantômas Mix) – 5:28

UK 12-inch vinyl by Bogdan Raczynski

1. "Who Is It (Carry My Joy on the Left, Carry My Pain on the Right)" (Shooting Stars & Asteroids Mix) – 5:21

European, Japanese and UK DVD single

1. "Who Is It (Carry My Joy on the Left, Carry My Pain on the Right)" (Video) – 3:52
2. "Who Is It (Carry My Joy on the Left, Carry My Pain on the Right)" (Choir Mix) – 7:42
3. "Mouth's Cradle" (Cortejo Afro & Ilê Aiyê Mix) – 4:00

== Credits ==
Credits adapted from Medúlla album booklet.

- Björk – lead vocals, songwriting, producer, arrangement, programming, bass synth
- Tagaq – Inuit throat singing
- Rahzel – beatboxing
- Mark Bell – programming
- Matmos – programming
- Valgeir Sigurdsson – programming
- Mark "Spike" Stent – mixing

== Charts ==
Weekly chart performance for "Who Is It"
Chart (2004)	Peak position
France (SNEP)	62
Italy (FIMI)	26
Scottish Singles Sales (Official Charts)	37
Spain (Promusicae)	5
UK Singles (Official Charts)	26
UK Indie (Official Charts)	3
