= Calmi Cuori Appassionati =

2001 film by Isamu Nakae

- DVD cover
- 冷静与熱情之間; Reisei to Jōnetsu no Aida
- Directed by: Isamu Nakae
- Written by: Kaori Eguni (novel); Fumie Mizuhashi; Jinsei Tsuji (novel)
- Produced by: Toru Ota
- Starring: Yutaka Takenouchi; Kelly Chen; Roberto Brunetti
- Cinematography: Toyoshi Tsuda
- Edited by: Hiroshi Matsuo
- Music by: Enya; Ryo Yoshimata
- Release date: 2001
- Running time: 125 minutes
- Country: Japan
- Languages: Japanese (main); Italian; English
- Box office: ¥2.7 billion ($34,846,000)

Calmi Cuori Appassionati (Note: Calmi Cuori Appassionati (Italian for 'Calm Passionate Hearts'; Pronounced [ˈkalmi ˈkwɔːri appassjoˈnaːti]; Japanese: 冷静与熱情之間, romanized: Reisei to Jōnetsu no Aida, pronounced [ɾeːseː toꜜ dʑoːnetsɯ no aida]; 'Between Calmness and Passion'.) is a 2001 Japanese movie directed by Isamu Nakae, starring Yutaka Takenouchi and Kelly Chen. It is a love story about two students who met at an art college in Japan. The film is based on a 1999 novel which was a best seller in Japan. Calmi Cuori Appassionati was a hit, becoming the 8th highest-grossing film in Japan of 2001.

The title tune is "Wild Child" from the album A Day Without Rain by Enya. An album of Enya's songs used in the film was released in 2001 as Themes from Calmi Cuori Appassionati.

== Plot ==
Living in Florence, Italy, in 1997, Junsei Agata is studying to be a restoration expert who specializes in fine art studying under his Italian teacher Giovanna. Despite dating Memi, a language school student in Italy, he feels life is empty. This is because he clings to the memory of Aoi, a girl from school he met in 1990 in a record shop and dated. One day, he learns Aoi is in Milan and finds she lives with a wealthy American businessman Marvin Lai, who met her while talking about the painting of Junsei's grandfather. He finds she lives in a different world now from when he left and moved on. He returns to his restoration workshop, only to find out he is falsely charged with the vandalism of a Cigoli painting he was restoring. An exhausted Junsei returns home. The next day he confronts Takanashi for falsely framing him for vandalism, but it turns out that no one can catch the culprit. His Italian teacher, Giovanna, comforts Junsei saying that unlike Italy, which is stuck in the past and tries so hard to restore it, he has a future. However, a traumatized Junsei, unwilling to get another restoration job, runs back to Japan.

In 1998, Junsei is shown to be still missing Aoi, as Memi finds his drawings of her by in his house. Despite living together, Marvin and Aoi still are not married, unlike her friend Daniella who is marrying Lucas. Aoi receives a letter from Junsei and hides it in a box.

Meanwhile, Junsei's grandfather Agata Seiji falls ill. His relationship with Memi reaches a crisis after she learns from Junsei's friend Takashi that Junsei once had a baby with Aoi but moved on. To talk these matters, Junsei talks with Takashi, and he replies love with true loves don't end up well.

The movie flashes back to the point when Junsei and Aoi broke up. She lost her baby and, for her own reasons, chose not to tell Junsei, who decides to break up with her.

As Seiji nears his death, family conflict regarding inheritance ensues, and one of the family members insults Aoi of having a baby with Junsei for money. Angry, Junsei fights that family member requesting him to apologize.

In 1999, Aoi replaces the painting of Junsei's grandfather with a new painting to move on from memories of Junsei. However, Marvin finds the letter from Junsei in her box and confronts her, doubting her motivations in the relationship with himself, saying her heart is not with him. Aoi decides to read the letter.

As she reads the letter, film flashes back to 1990, which reveals Junsei and Aoi's first encounter and how their dating went, as well as the fact that Aoi was always lonely girl who was struggling from her new married parents, and a girl who decided to study in Japan to reconnect with the heritage of his father despite her originally from overseas, and a girl who is trying to find her place in life. After reading Junsei's letter and realizing how Junsei truly understood and loved her, she finally calls Junsei but she hangs up without saying anything and cries afterwards.

One day, Angello calls Junsei to tell Giovanna committed suicide without an unknown cause (though it is implied to be because Giovanna did not move on from her love to Junsei, who she had special attention to and treat him as her muse), and Junsei, as the marriage of Luca and Daniella is happening on the other side, reunites with Angello and Takahashi in a workshop. Takahashi finally reveals it was Giovanna that vandalised the painting, and the students framed him to protect their workshop from being closed, and admits Takahashi and Giovanna was jealous of Junsei's talents and his constant nature too much that they did not tell the authorities the truth. Takahashi also tells Junsei, Giovanna's love for Junsei and the workshop planning to be reopened.

In the year 2000, Junsei suddenly moves on from his life with Memi in Japan and decides to return to Italy as a restoration worker, and disappointed Memi breaks up with Junsei after knowing his heart is still with Aoi. Meanwhile, Aoi rides the plane to LA with his partner Marvin Lai.

In 2001, as Junsei restores the picture of Cigoli, he rejuvenates from his trauma from the vandalism incident and Junsei reminisce a 10-year promise with Aoi. When he was a college student in Japan, he made a promise with Aoi to meet on the top of the Duomo in Florence on her 30th birthday. He hangs on to one slight hope that Aoi must have remembered the promise. He decides to return to Florence to prove the love between him and Aoi is true at the top of the Duomo. Aoi takes Junsei to a string quartet concert, which plays the same song when they first kissed, and kisses, and make love. Aoi after realizing that her true love was Junsei all along, she refuses to return with Marvin to LA. However Junsei decides to live the "present", as he cannot fill his heart from her calm rejection of rekindling relationship (continuing till present and possibly future) with passion of a bygone past and nostalgia. (Thus the title, betwixt calm and passion, calmness more appropriately translated as cold) The film ends with the two looking at each other from afar in the crowd.

== Cast ==
- Yutaka Takenouchi as Agata Junsei
- Kelly Chen as Aoi
- Roberto Brunetti as Luca
- Valeria Cavalli as Giovanna
- Luciano Federico as Angelo
- Silvia Ferreri as Daniela
- Arnoldo Foà as The Restorer
- Reona Hirota as Asami
- Nana Katase
- Hisanori Koshimizu
- Tatsuo Matsumura as Seiji Agata, grandfather of Agata Junsei
- Ryôta Matsushima
- Marisa Merlini as Gina
- Shinya Owada as Kiyomasa Agata
- Kenichi Sano
- Yūsuke Santamaria as Takashi
- Kippei Shiina as Takanashi
- Ryoko Shinohara as Memi
- Sansei Shiomi as The Lawyer
- Michael Wong as Marvin Lai

== Reception ==
The film opened at number one at the Japanese box office with an opening weekend gross of 279 million yen ($2.3 million). It remained number one for a second week.

== Award nominations ==
2002 Awards of the Japanese Academy

- Nomination - Best Actor - Yutaka Takenouchi
- Nomination - Best Cinematography - Toyoshi Tsuda
- Nomination - Best Lighting - Minoru Kawai
