= I've Seen It All =

2000 song by Björk

Promotional single by Björk featuring Thom Yorke

from the album Selmasongs: Music from the Motion Picture Soundtrack Dancer in the Dark
- Released: 21 July 2000
- Recorded: March 2000
- Genre: Trip hop; baroque pop
- Length: 5:29
- Label: One Little Indian
- Songwriters: Björk; Sjón; Lars von Trier
- Producers: Björk; Mark Bell

"I've Seen It All" is a song recorded by Icelandic singer Björk for the Dancer in the Dark soundtrack, Selmasongs (2000). It was written by Björk, the Icelandic writer Sjón and the Danish filmmaker Lars von Trier. It was released as the first promotional single from Selmasongs on 21 July 2000, by One Little Indian Records. It was nominated for an Academy Award for Best Original Song. The lyrics speak of one acceptance of blindness.

The version from the soundtrack album Selmasongs is a duet with the Radiohead singer, Thom Yorke, while the version performed in the film is a duet with the actor Peter Stormare.

== Background ==
We've known about each other for a while. [We were] always just about to do something together, and we were just waiting for the right situation. I was really excited about this song; I thought that I finally had a song that deserved his voice, 'cause he's definitely my favorite male singer in the world. I asked him, and he being the kind of guy he is, full of integrity — there's not a grain of artificial, show-business behavior in him — he kind of insisted that he would turn up [in the studio] and be there for quite a while, so the communication in the song, the recording, was real and genuine. It wasn't just a turn-it-on, you know, "I recorded my bit in Las Vegas and he recorded his..." you know, [like] we never met or something. It was the opposite, and that actually came from him, 'cause I was all just kind of being in work mode, "Yeah, we have to get it done," and he was all, "No, no, no."

— Björk on working with Thom Yorke

Björk invited Radiohead singer Thom Yorke to record vocals in the album version. This new version was recorded over a four-day span in March 2000, with Björk recording her vocals in Las Vegas. In an interview with Time Out, she said: "It was my idea to work with Thom. We spent four days in Spain just singing as and when we felt like it. He's a very pure soul and I know he doesn't do things lightly. So it was great that he agreed." The song was made available for download through Björk's website on 21 July 2000.

== Reception ==
Alexandra Flood from MTV "wrote: "Björk describes the song as Selma's manifesto. It's a beautiful and eerie track, the pair's vocals careening over a techno beat, but just under a lovely set of strings. It's a minor masterpiece." Ryan Schreiber from Pitchfork said "the paired vocalists also seem an odd match here; when Björk's soaring, intense delivery meets Yorke's general disinterest, the chemistry is far from convincing".

=== Accolades ===
Awards and nominations for "I've Seen It All"
Year	Ceremony	Award	Result	Ref.
2001	5th Golden Satellite Awards	Best Original Song	Won	
2001	1st Phoenix Film Critics Society Awards	Best Original Song	Nominated	
2001	58th Golden Globe Awards	Best Original Song	Nominated	
2001	43rd Annual Grammy Awards	Best Pop Instrumental Arrangement Accompanying A Vocalist(s)	Nominated	
2001	5th Online Film & Television Association Awards	Best Original Song	Won	
2001	73rd Academy Awards	Best Original Song in a Motion Picture	Nominated	

== Music videos ==
There are two music videos for this single. The main version of the video is an excerpt from the film Dancer in the Dark in which Björk, Peter Stormare and others sing the song on a train. The second version was directed by Floria Sigismondi and was an interactive "webeo" (a web animation) for an MTV promotion. Björk appeared with her face painted and the viewer could change the scenes and special effects by clicking on the video. A third version was going to be directed by M/M Paris, but there were several problems with the distribution of the song, and finally the video was cancelled. Later, the idea for this video was used for the "Hidden Place" video.

== Live performances ==
"I've Seen It All" was performed by Björk and the Brodsky Quartet for the very first time in December 1999 at the Union Chapel in London, almost a year before it was released. Björk performed "I've Seen It All" at the 73rd Academy Awards, where the song was nominated for Best Original Song, with a 55-piece orchestra wearing her swan dress. She said before performing on the show, "I'm really excited [to perform]. I won many awards [and] I've been to a lot of [award] shows. This is the most exciting one for me. I'm not just gonna go and grab a fancy frock. It's about singing, so it's a completely different headspace, which is sort of why I'm doing it. I'm really excited. Really, really excited". Billboard ranked it as the ninth "most awesome" Oscar performance of all time, saying that Björk's "outfit may have cemented her place in Oscar lore, but Bjork's performance was just as memorable, and refreshingly unconventional".

== Cover versions ==
"I've Seen It All" has been covered by Bonnie 'Prince' Billy in his 2007 album Ask Forgiveness. It was covered by Tristan Tzara on their 2001 album Omorina Nad Evropom. It was also covered by the jazz organ trio Karl Orgeltríó and singers Ragnar Bjarnason and Salka Sól Eyfeld in 2017.

== Credits and personnel ==
Credits adapted from Björk's official website.

- Björk – vocals, songwriting, production, choir arrangement
- Sjón – songwriting
- Lars von Trier – songwriting
- Thom Yorke – vocals
- Vince Mendoza – arrangement, orchestration, conduction
- Guy Sigsworth – arrangement
- Mark Bell – production
- Mark "Spike" Stent – mixing
