= Shoplifter (artist) =

Icelandic artist

- Born: Hrafnhildur Arnardóttir; Reykjavik, Iceland
- Website: www.shoplifterart.com

Shoplifter (real name Hrafnhildur Arnardóttir) is a New York City-based contemporary artist who works with synthetic and natural hair. When Arnardóttir moved to New York in 1994, her birth name was mispronounced as Shoplifter and she has gone by that name ever since.

Shoplifter is known for her sculptures, wall murals, and site-specific installations and has shown her work worldwide and collaborated with artists from various countries. In 2004, she collaborated with musician Björk and created the hair mask for the cover of her album Medúlla. In 2008, she worked in collaboration with Aimez Vous Avec Ferveur to create a large-scale window installation at MoMA.

Shoplifter represented Iceland at La Biennale di Venezia in 2019 with her installation Chromo Sapiens.

== Early life and influences ==
Shoplifter was born in Reykjavik, Iceland. At an early age, she was introduced to the art of hair by her grandmother, who stored one of her cut-off braids in her bedroom drawer. She works with hair in various ways, creating multi-colored structures. Shoplifter has a background in painting and works within the spaces of art, design, and fashion.

She has collaborated with brands such as Moncler, Comme des Garçons, & Other Stories, and HAY.

Shoplifter completed her BFA at the Icelandic College of Art and Crafts in Iceland and her MFA at the School of Visual Arts in New York City.
