= Selmasongs =

Selmasongs: Music from the Motion Picture Soundtrack 'Dancer in the Dark'

Soundtrack album by Björk
- Released: 18 September 2000
- Recorded: 1999–2000
- Genres: Electronica; techno; classical; industrial; musique concrète
- Length: 32:14
- Label: One Little Indian
- Producers: Björk; Mark Bell

Björk chronology
Homogenic (1997)	Selmasongs: Music from the Motion Picture Soundtrack 'Dancer in the Dark' (2000)	Vespertine (2001)

Selmasongs: Music from the Motion Picture Soundtrack 'Dancer in the Dark' is the first soundtrack album by Icelandic musician Björk. It was released on September 18, 2000, by One Little Indian Records to promote and accompany the film Dancer in the Dark. In the film, Björk starred as Selma Ježková, a Czech immigrant who has moved to the United States. The album features classical arrangements, as well as melodies and beats composed of sounds from mundane objects, such as factory machines and trains.

Notably, some songs on the album have lyrics that are substantially different from their lyrics in the film, the most pronounced example being "Scatterheart". The album omits the vocals of actors David Morse, Cara Seymour and Vladica Kostic. Some lyrics were rewritten, perhaps to prevent spoiling crucial plot details, since the soundtrack was released in stores before the movie opened in theaters, or to make the record flow better as a stand-alone album. In particular, on the song "I've Seen It All", Thom Yorke performs the words sung by Peter Stormare in the film. In addition, the tracks "My Favourite Things" and the original "Next to Last Song" do not appear on the album at all, despite appearances in the film.

The track "I've Seen It All" was nominated for an Academy Award for Best Original Song, and was released as a promotional single in 2000. For the track, Björk made a "webeo" with director Floria Sigismondi that premiered on September 1, 2000, on MTV.com. It used a shorter version of the song that the singer recorded specifically for the webeo.

== Background ==
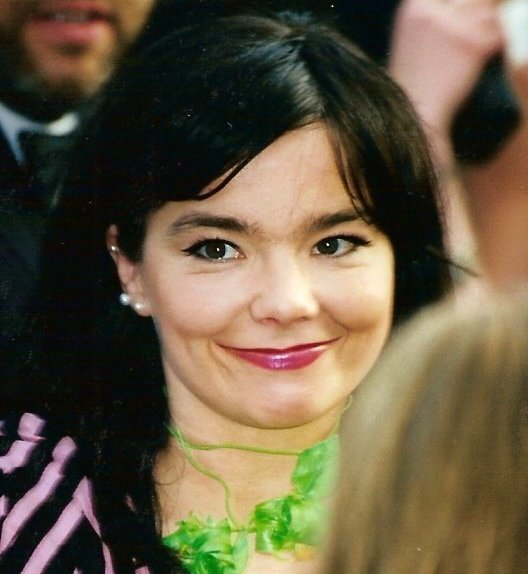
Björk promoting the film at the 2000 Cannes Film Festival.

Björk was initially offered the opportunity to write and produce the score for the film Dancer in the Dark. When she read the script, though, "the idea of putting all of me into this other person and trying to imagine what her interior would sound like was really exciting and quite liberating". Eventually, director Lars von Trier persuaded her to play the starring role. "The angle I took on it was that it wasn't really acting," said Björk. "Then when we started preparing for the acting I told [Trier] from the top that I would have to feel it from instinct. And he said 'That suits me fine because I can't stand actresses and acting'". Filming of Dancer in the Dark began in early 1999. She plays Selma, a Czech immigrant and single mother working in a factory in rural America who is going blind. Björk, who was known primarily as a musician, had rarely acted before, and has described the process of making the film as so emotionally taxing that she would not appear in any film ever again. She had several disagreements with Trier over the content of the film, and later called him sexist, accusing him of sexual harassment. Co-star Catherine Deneuve and others have described her performance as feeling rather than acting. Björk has said that it is a misunderstanding that she was put off acting by this film; rather, she never wanted to act but made an exception for Trier.

According to David Toop in The Wire, Selmasongs bridges "the art of noise of the Futurists, the plastic fantastic musique concrète slapstick of Esquivel, Dean Elliot and Jack Fascinato, techno beats and Broadway musicals". Barney Hoskyns wrote that the album continues the blend of techno and soaring strings first explored on Homogenic (1997), describing the contents as "torch-song histrionics with skittering Warp backbeats." Björk created the music using found sounds she recorded with a DAT recorder on the set of the film, resulting in a musique concrète style. As Toop explained, "Since the Selma character is isolated by blindness, stoicism and physical imprisonment, Björk used location sound as a way of finding music in ambient noise, one of the only sensory environments accessible to her." Accordingly, "Cvalda" starts with industrial sounds which soon become "a clipping shuffle", while "I've Seen It All" is built around a rhythmic loop of train sounds — created by Mark Bell and Valgeir Sigurdsson — which was compared by Toop to the sound design of the film Stalker (1979).

== Critical reception ==
Professional ratings
Aggregate scores
Source	Rating
Metacritic	76/100
Review scores
Source	Rating
AllMusic	3.5/5 stars
Entertainment Weekly	C−
Los Angeles Times	3/4 stars
Melody Maker	4/5 stars
NME	8/10
Pitchfork	7.4/10
Q	3/5 stars
Rolling Stone	4/5 stars
The Rolling Stone Album Guide	3/5 stars
Spin	8/10

At Metacritic, which assigns a normalised rating out of 100 to reviews from mainstream critics, the album received an average score of 76, based on 20 reviews, which indicates "generally favorable reviews". Heather Phares from AllMusic gave a positive review, commenting, "Selmasongs' best tracks are poignant, inventive expressions of Björk's talent and Selma's daydreams and suffering. [...] Selmasongs paints a portrait of a woman losing her sight, but it maintains Björk's unique vision". While giving a "C−" grade, David Browne from Entertainment Weekly noted that "the melding of drum and bass rhythms and panoramic classical orchestrations is as sonically impressive as it was on 1997's Homogenic. But something here brings out the most precious and irritating aspects of Björk's elfin voice", but "yet Selmasongs is mostly show tunes on Ecstasy, and you keep praying for a police raid".

=== Accolades ===
The song "I've Seen It All" was nominated for an Academy Award for Best Original Song, at the performance of which Björk wore her famous swan dress.

Awards
Recipient	Award	Category	Result	Ref.
Selmasongs	21st Brit Awards	Soundtrack/Cast Recording	Nominated	
Selmasongs	13th Chicago Film Critics Association Awards	Best Original Score	Nominated	
Selmasongs	4th Online Film Critics Society Awards	Best Original Score	Nominated	
Selmasongs	19th Robert Awards	Music of the Year	Won	
"Overture"	43rd Annual Grammy Awards	Best Pop Instrumental Performance	Nominated	
"I've Seen It All"	43rd Annual Grammy Awards	Best Pop Instrumental Arrangement Accompanying A Vocalist(s)	Nominated	
"I've Seen It All"	73rd Academy Awards	Best Original Song in a Motion Picture	Nominated	
"I've Seen It All"	58th Golden Globe Awards	Best Original Song	Nominated	
"I've Seen It All"	1st Phoenix Film Critics Society Awards	Best Original Song	Nominated	
"I've Seen It All"	5th Golden Satellite Awards	Best Original Song	Won	

== Commercial reception ==
Selmasongs sold more than 48,000 copies in the United States in less than two weeks.

== Track listing ==
No.	Title	Writer(s)	Producer(s)	Length
1.	"Overture"	Björk	Björk	3:38
2.	"Cvalda" (with Catherine Deneuve)	Björk; Mark Bell; Sjón; Lars von Trier	Björk; Bell	4:48
3.	"I've Seen It All" (with Thom Yorke)	Björk; Sjón; Trier	Björk; Bell	5:29
4.	"Scatterheart"	Björk; Sjón; Trier	Björk; Bell	6:40
5.	"In the Musicals"	Björk; Bell; Sjón; Trier	Björk; Bell	4:41
6.	"107 Steps" (with Siobhan Fallon)	Björk; Sjón; Trier	Björk; Bell	2:36
7.	"New World"	Björk; Sjón; Trier	Björk	4:22
Total length:				32:14

== Personnel ==
Credits adapted from the liner notes of Selmasongs.

- Mark Bell - producer (2-6), programming, writer (2, 5)
- Björk – arrangement (2-7), celesta, performer (2-7), producer, vocal editing, writer
- Jake Davies - additional recording, Pro Tools technician
- Catherine Deneuve - performer (2)
- Matt Fields - additional & assistant recording
- Geoff Foster - orchestra recording
- Ben Georgiades - assistant orchestra recording
- Isobel Griffiths – contractor (orchestra)
- Siobhan Fallon Hogan - performer (6)
- Jan 'Stan' Kybert - Pro Tools technician
- mecompany - cover
- Vincent Mendoza – arrangement, orchestra conductor
- Siobhan Paine - coordinator (Olympic Sessions)
- Sjón - writer (2-7)
- Valgeir Sigurðsson – engineering, programming
- Guy Sigsworth – arrangement (3), celesta
- Spike Stent - mixing
- Ad Stoop - location sounds
- Per Streit - location sounds
- Damian Taylor - celesta processing technician
- Lars von Trier - writer (2-7)
- Paul 'Dub' Walton - additional recording
- Wayne Wilkins - mixing assistant
- Thom Yorke - performer (3)

== Charts ==
=== Weekly charts ===
2000 weekly chart performance for Selmasongs
Chart (2000)	Peak position
Australian Albums (ARIA)	54
Austrian Albums (Ö3 Austria)	21
Belgian Albums (Ultratop Flanders)	38
Belgian Albums (Ultratop Wallonia)	31
Danish Albums (Hitlisten)	4
Dutch Albums (Album Top 100)	85
European Albums (Music & Media)	8
Finnish Albums (Suomen virallinen lista)	10
French Albums (SNEP)	4
German Albums (Offizielle Top 100)	22
Italian Albums (FIMI)	20
Norwegian Albums (VG-lista)	2
Japanese Albums (Oricon)	17
Polish Albums (ZPAV)	19
Portuguese Albums (AFP)	9
Scottish Albums (Official Charts)	46
Spanish Albums (AFYVE)	47
Swedish Albums (Sverigetopplistan)	12
Swiss Albums (Schweizer Hitparade)	20
UK Albums (Official Charts)	31
UK Independent Albums (Official Charts)	3
US Billboard 200	41

2010 weekly chart performance for Selmasongs
Chart (2010)	Peak position
South Korean International Albums (Gaon)	64

=== Year-end charts ===
Year-end chart performance for Selmasongs
Chart (2000)	Position
French Albums (SNEP)	42

== Certifications and sales ==
Certifications and sales for Selmasongs
Region	Certification	Certified units/sales
Japan (RIAJ)	Platinum	200,000^{^}
United States	—	201,000
^{^} Shipments figures based on certification alone.
