= Oceania (song) =

Promotional single by Björk

from the album Medúlla
- Released: 13 August 2004
- Recorded: 2004
- Studio: Olympic Studios (London, England)
- Genre: A cappella; vocal
- Length: 3:24
- Label: One Little Indian
- Songwriters: Björk; Sjón
- Producers: Björk; Mark Bell

Isobel song cycle singles chronology
"Bachelorette" (1997)	"Oceania" (2004)	"Wanderlust" (2008)

Music video
- "Oceania" on YouTube

"Oceania" is a song recorded by Icelandic singer Björk for her fifth studio album Medúlla. It was written and produced by Björk, with additional writing by Sjón and production by Mark Bell. The song was written by the singer specially for the 2004 Summer Olympics Opening Ceremony, after a request by the International Olympic Committee. "Oceania" was released as a promotional single on 13 August 2004, by One Little Indian Records. The song was written at the ocean's point of view, from which the singer believes all life emerged, and details the human's evolution, whilst accompanied by a choir. "Oceania" was generally well received by music critics, who believed it was the best track from Medúlla, although some thought it was not the best choice for a promotional release.

The accompanying music video for the song, directed by Lynn Fox, features Björk as "Mother Oceania", whilst being jewel-encrusted in dark watery depths, with a colourful sunset and swirling floral creatures above her. A remix of the song, featuring additional lyrics and vocals by Kelis on her point of view of the continents, was featured as a B-side to the "Who Is It" single. A piano version also appeared on the DVD single, and was assisted in its creation by Nico Muhly. The song was premiered during Björk's performance on the Summer Olympics ceremony, and was later included on the setlist of the Volta tour (2007–08). At the 47th Grammy Awards in 2005, it was nominated in the category of Best Female Pop Vocal Performance. Cover versions of "Oceania" were done six times, while it was sampled once.

== Background and composition ==
The International Olympic Committee commissioned a song by Björk specially for the 2004 Summer Olympics opening ceremony. The singer revealed that the committee asked her to do a kind of "Ebony and Ivory" or "We Are the World" type of song, which are "smashing tunes" according to her, but she thought, "'Maybe there's another angle to this'. When I tried to write an Olympic lyric, though, it was full of sports socks and ribbons. I ended up pissing myself laughing". Then, she called Sjón, an Icelandic poet who had previously collaborated with her on songs such as "Bachelorette" from her fourth studio album Homogenic (1997). When she said to him that they would need something "suitably epic" for the Olympics, the poet even took a short course about Greek mythology at Reykjavík University. "Oceania" was the last song recorded for Medúlla. Björk said about the song: "I am incredibly honoured to have been asked to write a song and sing it at the Olympics. The song is written from the point of view of the ocean that surrounds all the land and watches over the humans to see how they are doing after millions of years of evolution. It sees no borders, different races or religion which has always been at the core of these [games]".

During an interview with British radio station XFM, Björk explained its recording process, saying work on "Oceania" was kept being delayed because she wanted to do it especially for the Olympics. During the last day of mixing, she thought she needed "sirenes", like in Greek mythology. She called up an English choir to record these sounds. The singer had done an arrangement for piano on the computer that was impossible for a piano to play, and she got them to sing it. Then, she also called up beatboxer Shlomo, who was recommended to her as "the new bright hope of the hip hop scene". He went to record the next day and Björk asked him to do a techno tango beat, which he did. Recalling her work on the song until her last day of mixing, she commented, "That was the most fun part, in the end. Sometimes it's good for you to work with a gun against your head and just go for it, because you can sometimes sit too long with ideas. Sometimes adrenaline is a good thing."

The song was written at the ocean's point of view, detailing the human's evolution. According to Jason Killingsworth from Paste magazine, it calls listeners' attention to "Mother Oceania" from which the singer believes all life emerged, whilst she sings: "You have done well for yourselves / Since you left my wet embrace / And crawled ashore […]". The song anchors the midsection of Medúlla, "jubilantly punctuated with bubbling synth and propelled by the rolling, spitfire cadence of Rahzel's beatbox", according to the reviewer. The last line from the song, "Your sweat is salty/ And I am why/ Your sweat is salty/ And I am why", is about how "we were all little jellyfish or whatever before we made it on to land", according to the singer. Elthan Brown from New York magazine considered these lyrics as "frank sensuality". "Oceania" also features The London Choir. Entertainment Weekly's writer Chris Willman commented that "the computer-enhanced choir behind Björk [suggests] a cosmic harem of pleased dolphins. Here she imagines herself as the sea itself, proud of all the belegged creatures she's spit out onto land over the last hundred million years. It's the nearest evolutionists have come to having their own gospel tune".

== Remixes ==
A remix version of "Oceania" featuring additional lyrics and vocals by American singer Kelis was recorded. She explained they were set to perform on Fashion Rocks concert in London the previous year, and their dressing rooms were right next to each other. Björk had an album by Canadian singer Peaches that was skipping, then Kelis gave her the copy of the album she had. They started talking and eventually hung out and exchanged numbers after the show, and later Björk contacted Kelis to work together, which she agreed. Then, Kelis recorded her vocals at Electric Lady Studios in New York City, and wrote her own words in the song, from the point of view of the continents. Originally not intended to be commercially released, the remix leaked after being played on BBC Radio 1's The Breezeblock, but was then included on the "Who Is It" single as a B-side. According to The Guardian, "it's a brilliant fusing together of two distinct voices, Kelis handling the breathy first verse, as layers of her chopped-up vocals form the rhythm track, while Björk at first comes across as restrained, allowing Kelis' ad-libs to soar before unleashing a song-stopping, wordless roar that heralds the song's dramatic final coda".

A piano version also appeared on the DVD single, which was assisted in its creation by Nico Muhly. During an interview he stated, "When Björk asked me to play piano on Oceania, she sent me the music, and it was as complicated and layered as any piece of classical music I've played. I spent a few days figuring out how to make her vision of 'dueling lounge-lizard pianists' physically possible, and in the session, we ran through those quickly. Then, she experimented with different ways to space the progression of chords that runs through the piece - I suggested big, Brahmsy blocks - as well as the ending, for which we tried diaphanous, Debussy-like arpeggios". Björk decided to stick with the album's vocal concept and use electronically tweaked choral voices. Before some last-minute polishing by Mark Bell, this version of "Oceania" was the last track to be worked for Medúlla.

== Critical reception ==
"Oceania" received generally positive reviews from music critics. Jennifer Vineyard from MTV News called the song "one of those polarizing songs, with its Ethel Merman-like synchronized vocal sweeps that do suggest the aquatic, in a 1950s sort of way". Entertainment Weekly's Chris Willman labeled the track as a "strikingly beautiful" song. Alex Ross, reporter writing for The New Yorker stated that with "Oceania", Björk "confirmed her status as the ultimate musical cosmopolitan", acquainted with Karlheinz Stockhausen and the Wu-Tang Clan. Matthew Gasteier from Prefix magazine called the track "the best song on the album", whilst complimenting "its swooping chorus [which] recalls the migration of birds or the time-elapsed drifting of icebergs, a swirl of beauty and power crashing down onto and then rising above the mix. It culminates in the near screech that leads into the sexy-spooky coda". According to Andy Battaglia from The A.V. Club, in a positive review, "the electronic flourish strays from her organic vocal focus, but Björk summons the same kind of tingle with choral language" in the song, "which finds The London Choir reacting to what sounds like a thrilling slow-motion circus act".

"Oceania" was "spoilt by some overenthusiastic vocal whoopings", according to David Hooper from BBC Music. The Guardian's writer David Peschek said that when the singer sings in the song, "choral swoops [explodes] like fireworks behind her". AllMusic's Heather Phares noted that the song, along with Medúlla's lead single "Who Is It", "have an alien quality that is all the stranger considering that nearly all of their source material is human (except for the odd keyboard or two)". Dominique Leone of Pitchfork thought "Oceania" was hardly the most obvious choice for a promotional single release, despite its "bizarre, swooping soprano lines and cyclical chord progression outlined by a chorus of Wyatt vocal samples". Jeremy D. Larson from Time magazine provided a mixed review to the song, stating that it was the best Olympic theme song, but during the Olympics performance, "when she sang 'Every pearl is a lynx is a girl' we think you could hear the world collectively sigh, 'Where's Celine Dion?'". In 2005, the song was nominated for Best Female Pop Vocal Performance at the 47th Grammy Awards but lost out to Norah Jones' "Sunrise".

== Music video ==
Björk as "Mother Oceania" in the music video, wearing tiny crystal beads on her face

The accompanying music video for "Oceania" was directed by Lynn Fox, and was premiered on August 13, 2004 through Björk's official site. According to Lynn Fox, Björk gave the team the initial sketch of the track in January 2004. Whilst they were doing scribbles for it, they had several phone conversations with the singer and emailed her images to keep her up to date with the progress of the work. For "Oceania", initial animations took six weeks, then had couple of days preparing for the shoot in Iceland and a few more days after to put all the shots together. Björk's make-up took eight hours to be done and included a hand-collage of tiny crystal gems on her face. Post-production team The Mill was then hired to emphasise the glints that beam from them. Initially, a Flame spark was used to select and highlight glints automatically but the results proved "too random". For a more "organic" look, The Mill's Paul Marangos spent two days in Flame inputting glints by hand, using live action glints as reference. The Mill's Adam Scott further enhanced the video with an initial live action grade and final DCP. The video was finished just a day before the opening ceremony, leaving a small amount to get the video distributed to TV stations. BEAM.TV distributed the video instantly via its network of international post-production partners.

Like in the song, in the music video Björk is depicted as "Mother Oceania". The video opens with the surface of a body of water appearing yellowish and bright. Camera pans down to darker, deeper waters. Björk appears out of the dark background, singing and covered with sparkling jewels. As the second verse begins, images of jellyfish, representing the continents (her children) are thrown from Björk's hands. During the third verse they swim around and away from their mother, carried by the currents, which move in time with the song. In the bridge section, new sea flowers, with brilliant colors, emerge from the background, in contrast to the muted and darker colors of previous scenes. As the fifth verse continues, the camera pans back up to the much lighter surface, not seen since the beginning of the video. All sorts of marine life are swimming about the surface. Shortly after the sixth verse begins, Bjork is shown in deep, dark water. Several seconds later, the lighter surface of the water is shown without her. When she begins to sing "Your sweat is salty", a somewhat rapid alternation of images ensues: the light surface is shown for one second, followed by Björk singing in the deep water; these scenes alternate until she stops singing during the coda. Björk's vocal repetition ceases at the same time the visual alternation stops. The surface scene recedes, and Björk in the deep water comes to the fore, slowing. At the end of the video, she stands and smiles.

== Live performances ==
At the 2004 Summer Olympics Opening Ceremony, where Björk premiered the song, she wore a very large dress which unfolded during her performance of "Oceania" to eventually occupy the entire stadium, and showed a map of the world in sign of union. Additionally, Björk wore "bluish-purple glittery eye shadow across her lids. Her dark hair dangled in tiny twists that framed her pixieish, freckled face". Immediately after the performance at the Olympics opening ceremony, the song was downloaded more than 11,000 times on the iTunes Store. Jake Coyle from Today commented that her dress was "reminiscent in its uniqueness to the infamous swan dress she wore to the Oscars in 2001". According to Jeremy D. Larson from Time, if it weren't for the fireworks at the end of the song, he was legitimately unsure if people in the audience would have cheered. Dominique Leone of Pitchfork was surprised by the committee's choice of bringing Björk to perform at the ceremony, and stated: "They could have had anyone-- say, a reassuring Celine Dion or a physically ideal Beyoncé-- but they chose a prickly, decidedly uncomfortable Icelandic woman. On aesthetic grounds, I can't argue with their choice, but I continue to wonder about Björk's significance". "Oceania" was also performed during The Volta tour (2007–08).

== Samples and covers ==
The song was sampled by E-40 in the track "Spend the Night" featuring Laroo, The DB'z, Droop-E and B-Slimm on his 2010 Revenue Retrievin': Night Shift album. SPIRITWO and singer Yael Claire covered "Oceania" with a Middle Eastern theme for the 2012 London Olympic games. Aspirant singer Srbuhi Hovhannisyan also covered the song on The Voice of Armenia in 2014. "Oceania" covers also appear on the albums by Beliss, Harmen Fraanje Quintet, Murphy's Law and Serena Fortebraccio.

== Track listing ==
Digital download

1. "Oceania" (Album Version) – 3:24
2. "Oceania" (Radio Mix / Remix featuring Kelis) – 2:55

== Credits and personnel ==
Credits adapted from Medúlla liner notes.

- Björk – performer, songwriter, programmer
- Sjón – songwriter
- Mark Bell – producer, programmer
- The London Choir – performer
- Nico Muhly – piano
- Shlomo – beats
- Robert Wyatt – vocal samples
- Valgeir Sigurðsson – programmer
- Mark "Spike" Stent – mixing
