= List of 2001 box office number-one films in Japan =

This is a list of films which have placed number one at the weekly box office in Japan during 2001. Amounts are in Yen and, for the first five weeks, are only grosses from the top nine key cities.

== Number-one films ==
†	This implies the highest-grossing movie of the year.

#	Week ending	Film	Box office	Notes	Ref
1	1 January 2001	Dinosaur	¥133,500,000		
2	8 January 2001	Dinosaur	¥219,616,420		
3	15 January 2001	Dancer in the Dark	¥92,925,553	Dancer in the Dark reached number one in its fourth week of release	
4	22 January 2001	Dancer in the Dark	¥100,309,014		
5	29 January 2001	Dancer in the Dark	¥92,873,547		
6	2 February 2001	The Crimson Rivers	¥406,980,000	National grosses now reported not just top nine cities	
7	9 February 2001	Pay It Forward	¥418,099,968		
8	16 February 2001	Unbreakable	¥1,014,228,930		
9	23 February 2001	Unbreakable	¥574,482,402		
10	2 March 2001	Cast Away	¥924,216,951		
11	9 March 2001	Cast Away	¥599,743,935		
12	16 March 2001	Cast Away	TBD		
13	23 March 2001	Cast Away	TBD		
14	30 March 2001	Doraemon: Nobita and the Winged Braves	TBD		
15	6 April 2001	Hannibal	TBD		
16	13 April 2001	Hannibal	¥360,631,477		
17	22 April 2001	The Mexican	¥272,190,391		
18	29 April 2001	Hannibal	¥215,755,232	Weekend figures. Hannibal returned to number one in its fifth week of release	
19	6 May 2001	Hannibal	¥232,216,545	Weekend figures	
20	13 May 2001	Detective Conan: Countdown to Heaven	¥161,905,210	Detective Conan: Countdown to Heaven reached number one in its fourth week of release	
21	20 May 2001	Hannibal	¥98,681,056	Weekend figures. Hannibal returned to number one in its eighth week of release	
22	27 May 2001	Hotaru	¥173,764,606		
23	3 June 2001	Hotaru	¥155,934,353		
24	10 June 2001	The Mummy Returns	¥838,541,010	Weekend figures. The Mummy Returns set a record June opening	
25	17 June 2001	The Mummy Returns	¥391,481,990	Weekend figures	
26	24 June 2001	The Mummy Returns	¥330,000,000	Weekend figures	
27	1 July 2001	A.I. Artificial Intelligence	¥1,064,900,292	Weekend figures. A.I. set a record June opening beating the record set by The Mummy Returns	
28	6 July 2001	A.I. Artificial Intelligence	¥814,553,949	Weekend figures	
29	15 July 2001	Pearl Harbor	¥887,400,048	Weekend figures	
30	22 July 2001	Spirited Away †	¥1,100,671,343	Weekend figures. Spirited Away set an opening weekend record beating the record set by Princess Mononoke	
31	29 July 2001	Spirited Away †	¥1,080,000,000	Weekend only	
32	5 August 2001	Spirited Away †	¥980,264,618	Weekend only	
33	12 August 2001	Spirited Away †	¥1,027,797,052	Weekend only	
34	19 August 2001	Spirited Away †	¥958,118,051	Weekend only	
35	26 August 2001	Spirited Away †	¥960,000,000	Weekend only	
36	2 September 2001	Spirited Away †	¥730,826,005	Weekend only	
37	9 September 2001	Spirited Away †	¥753,024,000	Weekend only	
38	16 September 2001	Spirited Away †	¥702,600,000	Weekend only	
39	23 September 2001	Spirited Away †	¥548,590,968		
40	30 September 2001	Spirited Away †	¥467,449,017		
41	7 October 2001	Lara Croft: Tomb Raider	¥757,527,701	Weekend only	
42	14 October 2001	Spirited Away †	¥291,000,000	Spirited Away returned to number one in its thirteenth week of release	
43	21 October 2001	Spirited Away †	¥299,739,990		
44	28 October 2001	Spirited Away †	¥370,860,000		
45	4 November 2001	Spirited Away †	¥341,194,350		
46	11 November 2001	Calmi Cuori Appassionati	¥278,960,031	Weekend only	
47	18 November 2001	Calmi Cuori Appassionati	¥239,423,499	Weekend only	
48	25 November 2001	Spirited Away †	¥275,049,000	Spirited Away returned to number one in its nineteenth week of release	
49	2 December 2001	Harry Potter and the Sorcerer's Stone	¥1,573,341,524	Weekend only. Harry Potter and the Sorcerer's Stone beat the opening record set by Spirited Away	
50	9 December 2001	Harry Potter and the Sorcerer's Stone	¥1,516,029,612	Weekend only	
51	16 December 2001	Harry Potter and the Sorcerer's Stone	¥1,012,597,764		
52	23 December 2001	Harry Potter and the Sorcerer's Stone	TBD		
53	30 December 2001	Harry Potter and the Sorcerer's Stone	¥770,000,000	Weekend only	

== See also ==
- Lists of box office number-one films
