= SK Shlomo =

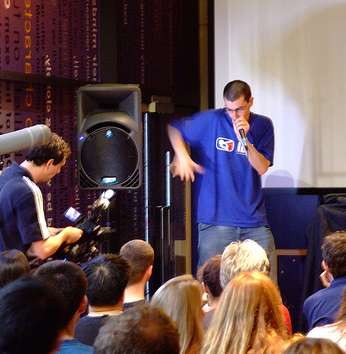
- SK Shlomo in 2007

Background information
- Also known as: SK Shlomo, Shlomo, Shlomo Sarah Kahn, Simon Shlomo Kahn
- Born: 1983 (age 42–43)
- Origin: Bourne End, Buckinghamshire, England, United Kingdom
- Genre: Hip-hop
- Occupation: Beatboxer
- Instruments: Beatboxing; beatrhyming; percussion
- Years active: 2002–present
- Website: skshlomo.com

Shlomo Sarah Kahn (born Simon Shlomo Kahn, 1983), known professionally as SK Shlomo and previously as Shlomo, is a British interdisciplinary performance artist, theatre maker, beatboxer, and live looping technologist. They are the founder and Artistic Director of the disabled-led organisation Nebula Productions.

== Background ==
SK Shlomo is of Jewish descent, with Israeli, Iraqi and German lineage. They grew up in the village of Bourne End, Buckinghamshire. They are a classically trained percussionist and a jazz drummer, learning the drums from the age of eight and playing classical percussion in youth orchestras. Their father is a jazz guitarist. They began making vocal rhythms as a child as a way to practice their drums, and in their teens discovered that others practiced the art of human beatboxing. In 2003 they left the Physics with Astrophysics degree course at Leeds University to pursue their music full-time.

== Career ==
SK Shlomo first began performing as a beatboxer in 2002 when they became the champion at the King of the Jam beatboxing tournament in London, winning a pot of Bonne Maman jam. They became known for their original beatboxing techniques including their 2-mic trancebox routine which they debuted at the World Beatbox Convention in 2003.

They first came to broader attention in 2004 when they collaborated with Björk on her a cappella song "Oceania", which Björk later performed at the opening ceremony of the 2004 Summer Olympics in Athens, Greece. The song "Oceania" was commissioned by the Olympic Games Committee and heard by an estimated 3.9 billion people around the world making SK Shlomo one of the most-heard beatboxers in history (although most would not have realised that the drum sounds were vocal). The performance was nominated for a Grammy Award. They began touring the UK, Europe and Canada with London hip hop act Foreign Beggars, before making a solo appearance on Later... with Jools Holland in late 2005. Following a performance at London's Queen Elizabeth Hall concert hall, they became Artist in Residence at Southbank Centre in 2007.

As part of their residency at Southbank Centre, SK Shlomo curated and performed in a collaborative concert series Music Through Unconventional Means from 2007 to 2010 which featured a diverse range of artists including Martha Wainwright, Teddy Thompson, DJ Yoda and Jarvis Cocker.

In 2015 SK Shlomo was named a BBC Music Ambassador alongside singers Tom Jones, Rae Morris, Jamie Cullum and George Ezra, producer Mark Ronson, and conductor Charles Hazlewood

=== The Vocal Orchestra ===
In 2007, they put together the world's first beatboxing choir, the Vocal Orchestra, to headline at the International Beatbox Convention. The original group consisted of a cappella ensemble The Swingle Singers alongside beatboxers MC Zani, Bellatrix and Neil Thomas. The group was created in 6 weeks, with their debut performance selling out before the group had even met. The process was recorded by filmmaker Colette McWilliams. Her documentary, The Beatbox Choir, was awarded Best Documentary at the OS International Film Festival, and included in the official selection at the D Reel International Film Festival, Australia. In 2012 the film was made freely available on SK Shlomo's website. After the initial process in 2007, SK Shlomo adapted the line-up of the Vocal Orchestra to comprise eight people to tour at festivals.

=== Music festivals ===
SK Shlomo has performed at festivals including Montreux Jazz Festival, Glastonbury, Bestival, Wilderness Festival and Lovebox. At The Big Chill festival they appeared as a guest of Nightmares on Wax in 2006, with their Vocal Orchestra in 2007, as a guest of the Mighty Boosh in 2008, as a collaborator with Hexstatic in 2009, and as a solo performer in 2010.

SK Shlomo has performed at every Glastonbury Festival since 2005. At Glastonbury in 2007, SK Shlomo performed as part of Africa Express and beatboxed on a live version of A Message to You, Rudy accompanying Terry Hall and Lynval Golding from The Specials with Damon Albarn on piano. Emily Eavis then invited SK Shlomo to return to Glastonbury in 2008 to curate and perform in a special 2-hour "Music Through Unconventional Means" set, with a host of guests including Martha Wainwright, Ed Harcourt, DJ Yoda, Reverend and the Makers, Portico Quartet, Lemn Sissay, and Martina Topley Bird.

At the 2009 Latitude Festival they collaborated with Jarvis Cocker as part of the Cape Farewell presentation, performing "Purple Haze". At Glastonbury in 2009 and 2010 they collaborated with vocal artist Imogen Heap and in 2011 with Ed Sheeran and Abandoman. In 2015 they created a Glastonbury drumming record with their guests Lily Allen and Rudimental. In 2015 SK Shlomo closed the Wilderness Festival with their Vocal Orchestra, the 50 strong Wilderness Orchestra and a 200 strong choir embedded in the audience.

=== Work in education and charity work ===
SK Shlomo founded the first Beatbox Academy in South London, teaches and speaks at educational conferences around the world, and continues to tour their acclaimed shows for kids.

In 2008, SK Shlomo co-founded a programme teaching beatboxing to young people called the Beatbox Academy with Battersea Arts Centre. They developed a series of free learning resources in association with Musical Futures which they published on their website.

They hosted a Concert Against Knife Crime in 2008 at the Queen Elizabeth Hall in an attempt to raise awareness of the benefits of working creatively with young people. Musical guests at the concert included Jarvis Cocker, Mutya Buena, Ashley Walters and Teddy Thompson. In 2008, they were commissioned to create a piece called "One Voice", bringing together four community choirs from diverse backgrounds including a Gospel Choir, a Brazilian Choir, a children's choir and a contemporary choir. The following year, they worked with BBC Blast to promote beatboxing to young people in a series of short films.

In April 2009 they created Urban Vani, a community project bringing together beatboxing and South Asian Dance. In 2012, they created a new Indian beatboxing orchestra called "Voctronica" in collaboration with the British Council.

SK Shlomo's charity work includes hosting blindfolded gigs for RLSB with Imogen Heap and Basement Jaxx, and regular collaborations with Cape Farewell, a climate change awareness charity. In 2005 they worked with the Ubuntu Educational Fund to raise money for orphaned and vulnerable children in South Africa. They have also made two charity collaborative albums with the proceeds going to War Child and Médecins Sans Frontières respectively.

Through their company Nebula Productions, Shlomo launched the BREATHE Academy, a programme supported by the Youth Music Trailblazer Fund. The project empowers marginalised young people (aged 12–25) to explore self-expression, identity, and mental health through music and technology.

Shlomo is an active campaigner for mental health awareness. They delivered a TEDx talk titled "How social media saved me from suicide" and serve as an ambassador for the suicide prevention charity CALM (Campaign Against Living Miserably).

=== Concerto for Beatboxer and Orchestra ===
In 2010 SK Shlomo performed the premiere of the "Concerto for Beatboxer and Orchestra" by Anna Meredith, an acclaimed contemporary composer who had risen to critical acclaim after composing a piece for the Last Night of the Proms. The Concerto was commissioned by Southbank Centre and was the first fully developed orchestral work to feature a beatboxer as the soloist, as well as 5 more beatboxers embedded in the 21 piece orchestra. Anna Meredith and SK Shlomo spent 2 years developing a notation system to create the score, which SK Shlomo then made available for free via their website.

=== World Loopstation championships ===
SK Shlomo incorporates a loop pedal into their solo performances to perform more complex original compositions and covers. In October 2010, they entered the UK heats of the World Loopstation Championships and became the UK Champion. They then flew to Los Angeles in January 2011 and was awarded the title of World Loopstation Champion by the judges Dave Navarro, Steve Stevens and Dub FX.

Since becoming the World Loopstation Champion, they have been in demand as an authority on technology and creativity. They have spoken at international events including TEDx, CDI in Mexico, ITV’s Big Think, Roundhouse Rising, Music Tech Fest, MGX (Microsoft USA) and WIRED2014.

=== Theatrical work and the Edinburgh Fringe ===
In 2011 SK Shlomo toured their first one-person theatrical show "Mouthtronica" which explored SK Shlomo's Iraqi-Jewish background and the story of how they became a beatboxer. In each performance, SK Shlomo improvised a spontaneous collaboration with a local guest artist, which were sourced via Twitter and Facebook. The collaborations were recorded for an improvised charity album which raised over £500 for medical charity Doctors Without Borders. After the initial 22 date UK tour, SK Shlomo took Mouthtronica to the Edinburgh Fringe Festival where the show received several five star reviews, was nominated for the Holden Street Theatres' Edinburgh Fringe Award and sold out for the entire four-week run. While they were in Edinburgh, SK Shlomo performed a collaboration with singer James Morrison for BBC Radio 1 and worked with their childhood hero Michael Winslow to create a special one-off show called "Old Skool meets New Skool".

SK Shlomo's theatrical work includes 3 full length one-person theatre shows, all of which have sold out at the Edinburgh Fringe Festival and toured the UK. They also created and directed a stage show entitled The Vocal Orchestra which for ran for at London's Southbank, Edinburgh Fringe and continues to tour internationally.

In 2022, SK Shlomo created BREATHE, a one-person gig-theatre show and accompanying album exploring suicide prevention, queer identity, and recovery. Described as blending "the energy of a rave with the storytelling of theatre," the show premiered at the Royal Albert Hall and won the Spirit of the Fringe Award for Theatre at the 2022 Edinburgh Festival Fringe.

=== Guinness World records ===
SK Shlomo has twice held the record for the World's Largest Beatbox Ensemble, and is the current holder for directing a group of 2,081 Google employees at the Dublin Convention Centre in November 2011.

=== Work as a composer ===
SK Shlomo is often commissioned to write for choirs, stage shows, films and adverts. Recent works include a score for the BFI's restoration of Alfred Hitchcock's Downhill, a specially commissioned piece for the Royal Festival Hall's organ and a nomination for the British Composer Awards for their piece for the National Youth Choir.

=== Beatbox For Kids ===
Shlomo has often toured Shlomo's Beatbox Adventure For Kids, an interactive show for families which features accessibility guides specifically designed for neurodivergent children.

== Personal life ==
SK Shlomo is non-binary, and uses they/them pronouns. They have spoken about their experiences of ADHD, autism and PTSD
