= The Blue Fox (novel) =

2003 novel by Sjón

- First edition (Icelandic)
- Author: Sjón
- Original title: Skugga-Baldur
- Translator: Victoria Cribb
- Language: Icelandic
- Publisher: Bjartur
- Publication date: 2003
- Publication place: Iceland
- English publication date: 2008
- Pages: 123
- ISBN: 9979-774-43-6

The Blue Fox (Icelandic: Skugga-Baldur) is a 2003 novel by Icelandic writer Sjón. The book was originally published by Bjartur and first published in the United States in 2013.

== Plot ==
The story takes place in Iceland in 1883. It opens with a priest hunting a blue fox, then jumps backward to the days leading up to the hunt. An herbalist buries a recently deceased woman with Down syndrome whom he had rescued from a shipwreck. It details their life together before returning to the present. The priest shoots and kills the mysterious blue fox he is hunting, but the sound from his rifle causes an avalanche. While trapped underneath the snow in a glacial cave, the priest starts to go insane. The fox comes back to life and argues with him about the invention of electricity, and the priest kills the fox a second time, this time skinning her and wearing the blue fox fur. He then transforms into a blue fox himself. The book ends with a letter from the herbalist, who explains that the girl with Down syndrome was the priest's daughter, whom the priest had sold into slavery several years before the herbalist rescued her.

== Reception ==
It won the Nordic Council Literature Prize in 2005. It was a finalist for the Jan Michalski Prize for Literature (2011).

== See also ==
- 2003 in literature
- Icelandic literature
