= List of Björk live performances =

Björk live performances
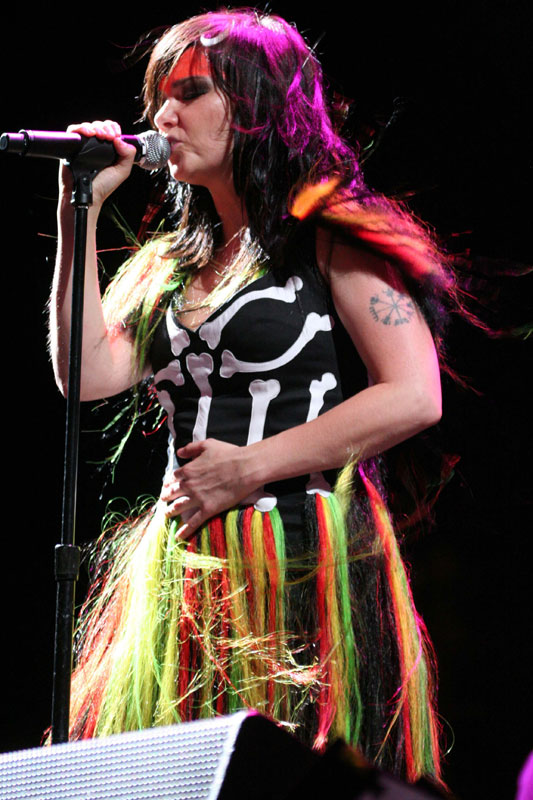
- Björk performing at Coachella Festival in Indio, California in 2007, as part of the Volta tour. In 2002, she became the festival's first female headliner.
- Concert tours: 11
- One-off concerts: 4
- Ceremonies: 11
- Television shows: 66
- Radio broadcasts: 4
- Web performances: 4
- Guest appearances: 25
- DJ sets: 80

Icelandic singer-songwriter Björk has embarked on eleven concert tours and has performed at various broadcast shows and live events. After leaving her band, The Sugarcubes, Björk promoted her first album Debut (1993) through performances at various shows and award ceremonies. While starting her Debut tour, Björk served as an opening act for U2 during their Zoo TV Tour stop at the Wembley Stadium in London. Björk performed a cover of The Rolling Stones' "(I Can't Get No) Satisfaction" with PJ Harvey at the 1994 Brit Awards. She also performed her single "Big Time Sensuality" at the inaugural MTV Europe Music Awards in Munich, while accompanied by Fluke. After the end of the tour, Björk curated her own MTV Unplugged special. Björk premiered her single "Army of Me" with a performance alongside Skunk Anansie at Top of the Pops. To promote its parent album, Post (1995), Björk started the eponymous concert tour, which saw her performing in different festivals and arenas throughout the globe.

In 1997, the release of Homogenic was accompanied by a short promotional stint in clubs with Mark Bell before starting a worldwide tour. The tour was extended to 1998 after plans for a North American leg with Radiohead were canceled due to staging and production difficulties. During the promotion of the album, she also performed "Bachelorette" at the 1997 MTV Europe Music Awards and during an appearance at Saturday Night Live. After receiving a Best Original Song nomination for "I've Seen It All", Björk performed the song at the 73rd Academy Awards, while dressed in her swan dress. To promote her fourth album Vespertine (2001), Björk embarked on a worldwide tour of opera houses and theaters, backed by a 54-piece orchestra. The following year, Björk became the first female artist to headline the Coachella Valley Music and Arts Festival. In 2003, the singer performed at several European festivals and North American arenas with her Greatest Hits tour. While there was no tour performances for the singer’s fifth studio album, Medúlla (2004), Björk performed "Oceania" at the 2004 Summer Olympics opening ceremony, for which the song was commissioned, while in 2005, the singer performed at the Live 8 concert in Chiba, Japan.

Björk did not tour again until The Volta tour in 2007, supporting her sixth studio album. The tour lasted two years, during which she returned to perform in Oceania and South America after more than 10 years. She once again was the headliner of major international music festivals, including Coachella, Glastonbury Festival, Big Day Out and Roskilde Festival. The tour faced many controversies due to Björk's support of Tibetan independence movement, Kosovo declaration of independence and Faroese independence movement during several performances of "Declare Independence". From 2011 until 2013, Björk embarked on her Biophilia tour, a multimedia project which featured her seventh studio album and a series of residencies and workshops that used the eponymous app to teach children about science and musicology. The tour was documented by the 2013 documentary When Björk Met Attenborough and the 2014 concert film Björk: Biophilia Live, and featured her first performance in Africa, but was hindered by a series of vocal cords issues, for which the singer underwent surgery. Similar problems caused the cancellation of the last shows of her following tour, the Vulnicura tour, which supported her 2015 eighth studio album. Following the schedule of her Björk Digital exhibition, the tour resumed with acoustic shows and festival performances in 2016 and 2017.

The singer supported the release of her 2017 album Utopia with a series of shows throughout Europe the following summer. In 2019, Björk announced Cornucopia, said to be her "most elaborate stage concert yet". It debuted as a residency show at The Shed arts center in New York before traveling worldwide. In 2021, Björk embarked on her eleventh concert tour, called Björk Orkestral, which setlist consisted of orchestral arrangements of songs from her career so far.

== Concert tours ==
Title	Dates	Associated album(s)	Continent(s)	Shows	Live release(s)	Ref.
Debut tour	19 August 1993 – 31 July 1994	Debut	Europe; North America; Oceania; Asia	50	Vessel	
Songs performed during the Debut tour: 1. "Human Behaviour"; 2. "Aeroplane"; 3. "Atlantic"; 4. "One Day"; 5. "Venus as a Boy"; 6. "Come to Me"; 7. "The Anchor Song"; 8. "Like Someone In Love"; 9. "Play Dead"; 10. "Crying"; 11. "Violently Happy"; 12. "There's More to Life Than This"; 13. "Big Time Sensuality"; 14. "Army of Me"; 15. "Síðasta Ég"; 16. "Stígðu Mig"; 17. "The Modern Things"; 18. "Moðir"
Post tour	6 July 1995 – 27 February 1997	Post	Europe; North America; Asia; Oceania; South America	113	Live at Shepherds Bush Empire; Post Live	
Songs performed during the Post tour: 1. "Headphones"; 2. "Army of Me"; 3. "One Day"; 4. "The Modern Things"; 5. "Human Behaviour"; 6. "You've Been Flirting Again"; 7. "Isobel"; 8. "Venus as a Boy"; 9. "Possibly Maybe"; 10. "Charlene"; 11. "I Go Humble"; 12. "The Anchor Song"; 13. "Hyperballad"; 14. "Enjoy"; 15. "I Miss You"; 16. "Crying"; 17. "Violently Happy"; 18. "5 Years"; 19. "It's Oh So Quiet"; 20. "Big Time Sensuality"; 21. "Sweet Intuition"; 22. "Le petit chevalier" 23. "Motorcrash"
Homogenic tour	8 June 1997 – 6 January 1999	Homogenic	North America; Europe; Asia; South America	58	Live in Cambridge; Homogenic Live	
Songs performed during the Homogenic tour: 1. "Vísur Vatnsenda-Rósu"; 2. "Hunter"; 3. "Headphones"; 4. "Come to Me"; 5. "Venus as a Boy"; 6. "All Neon Like"; 7. "You've Been Flirting Again"; 8. "Isobel"; 9. "Possibly Maybe"; 10. "5 Years"; 11. "Immature"; 12. "I Go Humble"; 13. "Play Dead"; 14. "Alarm Call"; 15. "Human Behaviour"; 16. "Bachelorette"; 17. "Hyperballad"; 18. "Violently Happy"; 19. "Pluto"; 20. "So Broken"; 21. "All Is Full of Love"; 22. "The Anchor Song"; 23. "Jóga"
Vespertine world tour	22 May 2001 – 21 December 2001	Vespertine	North America; Europe; Asia	36	Live at Royal Opera House; Minuscule; Vespertine Live	
Songs performed during the Vespertine tour: 1. "Frosti"; 2. "Overture"; 3. "All Is Full of Love"; 4. "Aurora"; 5. "Undo"; 6. "Unravel"; 7. "I've Seen It All"; 8. "An Echo, A Stain"; 9. "Generous Palmstroke"; 10. "Hidden Place"; 11. "Cocoon"; 12. "Unison"; 13. "Harm of Will"; 14. "It's Not Up to You"; 15. "Pagan Poetry"; 16. "Possibly Maybe"; 17. "Isobel"; 18. "Hyperballad"; 19. "Human Behaviour"; 20. "Jóga"; 21. "It's In Our Hands"; 22. "You've Been Flirting Again"; 23. "Army of Me"; 24. "Bachelorette"; 25. "Play Dead"; 26. "Venus as a Boy"; 27. "The Anchor Song"; 28. "Who Is It"; 29. "Gotham Lullaby"
Greatest Hits tour	24 May 2003 – 3 September 2003	Greatest Hits	Europe; Asia; North America	28	—N/a	
Songs performed during the Greatest Hits tour: 1. "Vísur Vatnsenda-Rósu"; 2. "Pagan Poetry"; 3. "Hunter"; 4. "Desired Constellation"; 5. "Mouth's Cradle"; 6. "Heirloom"; 7. "Unravel"; 8. "Scatterheart"; 9. "Army of Me"; 10. "Jóga"; 11. "Aurora"; 12. "Cocoon"; 13. "Mother Heroic"; 14. "Gotham Lullaby"; 15. "Show Me Forgiveness"; 16. "All Is Full of Love"; 17. "Storm"; 18. "An Echo, A Stain"; 19. "I've Seen It All"; 20. "Where Is the Line"; 21. "You've Been Flirting Again"; 22. "Isobel"; 23. "Nature Is Ancient"; 24. "Bachelorette"; 25. "5 Years"; 26. "It's In Our Hands"; 27. "Hyperballad"; 28. "Pluto"; 29. "Generous Palmstroke"; 30. "Síðasta Ég"; 31. "Scary"; 32. "Human Behaviour"
The Volta tour	9 April 2007 – 26 August 2008	Volta	Europe; North America; South America; Oceania; Asia	76	Voltaïc	
Songs performed during the Volta tour: 1. "Brennið Þið Vitar"; 2. "Cover Me"; 3. "Earth Intruders"; 4. "Venus as a Boy"; 5. "Hunter"; 6. "Immature"; 7. "The Dull Flame of Desire"; 8. "Oceania"; 9. "I See Who You Are"; 10. "Unravel"; 11. "Pagan Poetry"; 12. "All Is Full of Love"; 13. "Jóga"; 14. "Pleasure Is All Mine"; 15. "Hope"; 16. "Vertebrae by Vertebrae"; 17. "Where Is the Line"; 18. "Who Is It"; 19. "Desired Constellation"; 20. "Army of Me"; 21. "Innocence"; 22. "5 Years"; 23. "Hidden Place"; 24. "Aurora"; 25. "Unison"; 26. "Mother Heroic"; 27. "Cocoon"; 28. "Come to Me"; 29. "Aeroplane"; 30. "Human Behaviour"; 31. "It's Not Up To You"; 32. "Síðasta Ég"; 33. "Undo"; 34. "I Miss You"; 35. "Triumph of a Heart"; 36. "Bachelorette"; 37. "Vökuró"; 38. "Wanderlust"; 39. "Hyperballad"; 40. "Pluto"; 41. "The Anchor Song"; 42. "Declare Independence"; 43. "Overture"; 44. "Pneumonia"; 45. "My Juvenile"; 46. "Sonnets/Unrealities XI"; 47. "Mouth's Cradle"; 48. "It's Oh So Quiet"
Biophilia tour	27 June 2011 – 7 September 2013	Biophilia	Europe; North America; South America; Africa; Asia	70	When Björk Met Attenborough; Björk: Biophilia Live	
Songs performed during the Biophilia tour: 1. "Cosmogony"; 2. "Crystalline"; 3. "Mutual Core"; 4. "Thunderbolt"; 5. "Declare Independence"; 6. "Moon"; 7. "Hollow"; 8. "Náttúra"; 9. "Virus"; 10. "Hidden Place"; 11. "Mouth's Cradle"; 12. "Dark Matter"; 13. "Pagan Poetry"; 14. "Solstice"; 15. "One Day"; 16. "Jóga"; 17. "Sacrifice"; 18. "Possibly Maybe"; 19. "Isobel"; 20. "Hunter"; 21. "Óskasteinar"; 22. "Sonnets/Unrealities XI"; 23. "Where Is the Line"; 24. "Pluto"; 25. "Generous Palmstroke"; 26. "Heirloom"; 27. "Vertebræ by Vertebræ"; 28. "Unravel"; 29. "Hyperballad"; 30. "All Is Full of Love"; 31. "Army of Me"; 32. "You've Been Flirting Again"; 33. "It's Not Up to You"; 34. "Pleasure Is All Mine"; 35. "Who Is It"; 36. "Bachelorette"; 37. "Immature"; 38. "Undo"; 39. "Unison"; 40. "Venus as a Boy"
Vulnicura tour	7 March 2015 – 3 November 2017	Vulnicura	North America; Europe; Asia	27	Vulnicura Live	
Songs performed during the Vulnicura tour: 1. "Stonemilker"; 2. "Lionsong"; 3. "History of Touches"; 4. "Black Lake"; 5. "Family"; 6. "Notget"; 7. "Pleasure Is All Mine"; 8. "Come to Me"; 9. "Undo"; 10. "I See Who You Are"; 11. "Quicksand"; 12. "Mouth Mantra"; 13. "Harm of Will"; 14. "Wanderlust"; 15. "All Neon Like"; 16. "All Is Full of Love"; 17. "Sun In My Mouth"; 18. "Atom Dance"; 19. "Hunter"; 20. "Bachelorette"; 21. "Army of Me"; 22. "5 Years"; 23. "Mutual Core"; 24. "Hyperballad"; 25. "Possibly Maybe"; 26. "Where Is the Line"; 27. "Unravel"; 28. "One Day"; 29. "Aurora"; 30. "I've Seen It All"; 31. "Jóga"; 32. "Pagan Poetry"; 33. "The Anchor Song"; 34. "Pluto"; 35. "Vertebræ by Vertebræ"; 36. "You've Been Flirting Again"; 37. "Isobel"; 38. "Mouth's Cradle"
Utopia tour	9 April 2018 – 30 July 2018	Utopia	Europe	11	—N/a	
Songs performed during the Utopia tour: 1. "Arisen My Senses"; 2. "Utopia"; 3. "The Gate"; 4. "Blissing Me"; 5. "Thunderbolt"; 6. "Courtship"; 7. "Features Creatures"; 8. "Tabula Rasa"; 9. "Saint"; 10. "Pleasure Is All Mine"; 11. "Losss"; 12. "Sue Me"; 13. "Notget"; 14. "Paradisia"; 15. "The Anchor Song"; 16. "Isobel"; 17. "Human Behaviour"; 18. "Wanderlust"; 19. "Claimstaker"
Cornucopia	6 May 2019 – 5 December 2023	Utopia; Fossora (Note: The show incorporated songs from Fossora only during the 2023 leg.)	North America; Europe; Oceania; Asia	45	Cornucopia	
Songs performed during Cornucopia: 1. "The Gate"; 2. "Utopia"; 3. "Arisen My Senses"; 4. "Show Me Forgiveness"; 5. "Venus as a Boy"; 6. "Claimstaker"; 7. "Isobel"; 8. "Blissing Me"; 9. "Arpeggio"; 10. "Body Memory"; 11. "Hidden Place"; 12. "Mouth's Cradle"; 13. "Features Creatures"; 14. "Courtship"; 15. "Pagan Poetry"; 16. "Losss"; 17. "Sue Me"; 18. "Tabula Rasa"; 19. "Future Forever"; 20. "Notget"; 21. "Atopos"; 22. "Ovule"; 23. "Victimhood"; 24. "Fossora"; 25. "Mycelia"
Björk Orkestral	11 October 2021 – 23 April 2023	Various	Europe; North America; South America; Asia	20	Björk Orkestral with the Hamrahlíð Choir	
Songs performed during the Björk Orkestral tour: 1. "Stonemilker"; 2. "Aurora"; 3. "I've Seen It All"; 4. "Sun in My Mouth"; 5. "You've Been Flirting Again"; 6. "Isobel"; 7. "Hyperballad"; 8. "Harm of Will"; 9. "Bachelorette"; 10. "Unison"; 11. "Generous Palmstroke"; 12. "Show Me Forgiveness"; 13. "Pleasure Is All Mine"; 14. "Hidden Place"; 15. "Cosmogony"; 16. "Sonnets/Unrealities XI"; 17. "Unravel"; 18. "Vertabræ by Vertabræ"; 19. "Oceania"; 20. "Who Is It"; 21. "Mouth's Cradle"; 22. "Where Is the Line"; 23. "Human Behaviour"; 24. "New World"; 25. "Tabula Rasa"; 26. "Utopia"; 27. "The Gate"; 28. "Courtship"; 29. "Pagan Poetry"; 30. "Losss"; 31. "Sue Me"; 32. "Aeroplane"; 33. "Wanderlust"; 34. "Mutual Core"; 35. "The Anchor Song"; 36. "Jóga"; 37. "Come to Me"; 38. "Hunter"; 39. "Lionsong"; 40. "History of Touches"; 41. "Black Lake"; 42. "Mouth Mantra"; 43. "5 Years"; 44. "Quicksand"; 45. "Pluto"; 46. "Notget"; 47. "Overture"; 48. "Ovule"; 49. "Freefall"

== One-off concerts ==
Date	Event	Venue	Location	Performed song(s)	Ref.
9 December 1999	Concerts with Brodsky Quartet (Note: Selections from these shows were released on Family Tree (2002), the performance of "Gotham Lullaby" was released on Monk Mix: Remixes and Interpretations of Music by Meredith Monk (2012).)	Union Chapel	London, England	"Unravel"; "All Neon Like"; "Cover Me"; "I've Seen It All"; "Gotham Lullaby"; "Come to Me"; "Who Do You Think You Are?"; "The Modern Things"; "Hyperballad"; "Like Someone in Love"; "Sod Off"; "5 Years"; "Anyone Who Had a Heart"; "Downtown"; "It's Oh So Quiet"	
11 December 1999	Concerts with Brodsky Quartet	Union Chapel	London, England	"Unravel"; "Jóga"; "Cover Me"; "All Neon Like"; "Gotham Lullaby"; "I've Seen It All"; "You've Been Flirting Again"; "Come to Me"; "Like Someone in Love"; "5 Years"; "Hyperballad"; "Why?"; "Possibly Maybe"; "The Anchor Song"; "Bachelorette"; "Play Dead"; "Hunter"; "Anyone Who Had a Heart"; "Downtown"; "Silent Night"; "It's Oh So Quiet"	
27 April 2002	Coachella Festival	Empire Polo Club	Indio, United States	"All Is Full of Love"; "Cocoon"; "Jóga"; "Generous Palmstroke"; "Hunter"; "Pagan Poetry"; "5 Years"; "Isobel"; "Gotham Lullaby"; "Heirloom"; "Bachelorette"; "Army of Me"; "Human Behaviour"; "It's in Our Hands"; "Pluto"	
2 July 2005	Live 8	Makuhari Messe	Chiba, Japan	"Pagan Poetry" (instrumental); "Pagan Poetry"; "All Is Full of Love" (Note: This performance was released on Live 8 (2005).); "Desired Constellation"; "Jóga"; "Hyperballad"; "Generous Palmstroke"; "Bachelorette"; "It's in Our Hands" (Soft Pink Truth Mix)	

== Ceremonies ==
Date	Event	Venue	Location	Performed song(s)	Ref.
5 December 1993	1993 Smash Hits Poll Winners Party	Docklands Arena	London, England	"Big Time Sensuality" (with Fluke)	
14 February 1994	1994 BRIT Awards	Alexandra Palace	London, England	"(I Can't Get No) Satisfaction" (with PJ Harvey)	
24 November 1994	1994 MTV Europe Music Awards	Brandenburg Gate	Berlin, Germany	"Big Time Sensuality" (with Fluke)	
3 December 1995	1995 Smash Hits Poll Winners Party	Docklands Arena	London, England	"It's Oh So Quiet"	
4 March 1997	1997 Nordic Council Music Prize	Oslo City Hall	Oslo, Norway	"Hyperballad"; "You've Been Flirting Again"; "5 Years"	
6 November 1997	1997 MTV Europe Music Awards	The Ahoy	Rotterdam, Netherlands	"Bachelorette"	
25 March 2001	73rd Academy Awards	Shrine Auditorium	Los Angeles, United States	"I've Seen It All"	
9 March 2002	2002 Victoires de la Musique	Le Zénith	Paris, France	"It's Not Up to You"	
15 October 2003	2003 Fashion Rocks	Royal Albert Hall	London, England	"Bachelorette"	
13 August 2004	2004 Summer Olympics opening ceremony	Olympic Stadium of Athens	Athens, Greece	"Oceania"	
28 February 2026	2026 BRIT Awards	Co-op Live	Manchester, England	"Berghain" (with Rosalía and Heritage Orchestra)	

== Television shows ==
Date	Show	Network	Country	Performed song(s)	Ref.
2 July 1993	Later... with Jools Holland	BBC Two	England	"Aeroplane" (with D'Influence)	
13 August 1993	The Beat	ITV	England	"Big Time Sensuality"; "Come to Me"; "Venus as a Boy"	
9 September 1993	Top of the Pops	BBC One	England	"Venus as a Boy"	
29 September 1993	U	NRK1	Norway	"Come to Me"; "The Anchor Song"	
13 October 1993	Planeta Rock (Note: These performances were included in the "Violently Happy" single (1994).)	TVE	Spain	"The Anchor Song"; "Come to Me"; "Human Behaviour"	
10 November 1993	Late Night with Conan O'Brien (Note: This performance was released on Live from 6A: Great Musical Performances from Late Night with Conan O'Brien (1997).)	NBC	United States	"Human Behaviour"	
15 November 1993	Dance Energy	BBC Two	England	"Big Time Sensuality" (with Fluke)	
21 November 1993	120 Minutes	MTV	United States	"Come to Me"; "Aeroplane" (Note: This performance was released on 120 Minutes Live (1998).)	
22 November 1993	MTV's Most Wanted	MTV Europe	England	"Come to Me"; "The Anchor Song"	
2 December 1993 (Note: Recorded live from Rennes, France.)	Top of the Pops	BBC One	England	"Big Time Sensuality"	
16 February 1994	Nulle part ailleurs	Canal+	France	"Violently Happy"	
8 March 1994	Le Cercle de minuit	France 2	France	"Violently Happy"; "Human Behaviour"	
17 March 1994	Top of the Pops	BBC One	England	"Violently Happy"	
15 April 1994	The Tonight Show with Jay Leno	NBC	United States	"Big Time Sensuality"	
7 June 1994	Festivalbar	Italia 1	Italy	"Big Time Sensuality"	
17 June 1994	MTV's Most Wanted	MTV Europe	England	"Human Behaviour"; "Big Time Sensuality"	
7 November 1994 (Note: Recorded on 1 September 1994.)	MTV Unplugged (Note: This performance was released on MTV Unplugged / Live (2002).) (Note: This performance was included in Debut Live (2004).)	MTV Europe	England	"Human Behaviour"; "One Day"; "Come to Me"; "Big Time Sensuality"; "Aeroplane"; "Like Someone in Love"; "Crying"; "The Anchor Song"; "Violently Happy"	
20 April 1995	Top of the Pops	BBC One	England	"Army of Me"	
22 April 1995	The White Room	Channel 4	England	"Army of Me"; "I Miss You"	
4 May 1995	Top of the Pops	BBC One	England	"Army of Me" (with Skunk Anansie)	
13 June 1995	Festivalbar	Italia 1	Italy	"Army of Me"	
17 June 1995	Later... with Jools Holland (Note: This performance was released on Later with Jools Holland (2003; re-issued in 2012).)	BBC Two	England	"Hyperballad" (Note: This performance was included in Post Live (2004).); "Possibly Maybe"; "Venus as a Boy"	
16 August 1995	Late Show with David Letterman	CBS	United States	"Hyperballad"	
17 August 1995 (Note: Recorded live from New York City, United States.)	Top of the Pops	BBC One	England	"Isobel"	
24 August 1995	Top of the Pops	BBC One	England	"Isobel"	
27 October 1995	Zona franca	TVE	Spain	"I Miss You"	
2 November 1995	The Tonight Show with Jay Leno	NBC	United States	"It's Oh So Quiet"	
23 November 1995	Top of the Pops	BBC One	England	"It's Oh So Quiet"	
24 November 1995	Children in Need	BBC One	England	"It's Oh So Quiet"	
14 December 1995	Top of the Pops	BBC One	England	"It's Oh So Quiet"	
13 January 1996	Jack Dee's Saturday Night	Channel 4	England	"It's Oh So Quiet"	
18 February 1996	Taratata	France 2	France	"It's Oh So Quiet"	
19 April 1996	TFI Friday	Channel 4	England	"I Miss You"	
1 November 1996	TFI Friday	Channel 4	England	"Possibly Maybe"	
8 November 1996	Top of the Pops	BBC One	England	"Possibly Maybe"	
14 March 1997	Red Nose Day	BBC One	England	"Short Term Affair" (with Tony Ferrino)	
19 September 1997	TFI Friday	Channel 4	England	"Jóga"	
3 October 1997	Top of the Pops	BBC One	England	"Jóga"	
18 October 1997	Saturday Night Live	NBC	United States	"Bachelorette"	
9 November 1997	The South Bank Show (Note: The documentary also includes rehearsals and other already released live performances.)	ITV	England	"Unravel"	
29 November 1997	Later... with Jools Holland	BBC Two	England	"Bachelorette" (Note: This performance was included in Homogenic Live (2004).); "Hunter"; "Jóga"	
11 February 1998	Nulle part ailleurs	Canal+	France	"Jóga"; "Bachelorette"	
14 February 1998	MTV Live 'n' Loud	MTV Europe	England	"You've Been Flirting Again"; "Isobel"; "Human Behaviour"; "Bachelorette"; "Jóga"; "Pluto"	
22 May 1998	The Tonight Show with Jay Leno	NBC	United States	"Bachelorette"	
20 June 1998	Hit Machine	M6	France	"Hunter"; "Bachelorette"	
16 October 1998	Later... with Jools Holland	BBC Two	England	"So Broken"	
5 December 1998	CD:UK	ITV	England	"Alarm Call"	
31 December 1999	2000 Today	Various	Iceland	"The Anchor Song"	
17 August 2001	Top of the Pops	BBC One	England	"Hidden Place"; "Cocoon" (Note: Aired on 22 March 2002.)	
4 September 2001	Late Show with David Letterman	CBS	United States	"Pagan Poetry"	
17 October 2001	Reverb	HBO	United States	"Pagan Poetry"; "Possibly Maybe"; "Generous Palmstroke"; "All Is Full of Love"; "Unravel"; "Hidden Place"; "The Anchor Song"	
19 October 2001	The Tonight Show with Jay Leno	NBC	United States	"Cocoon"	
14 January 2002	NEWS23	JNN	Japan	"Pagan Poetry"; "Generous Palmstroke"	
26 February 2002	Johnny Vaughan Tonight	BBC One	England	"Cocoon"	
6 March 2002	Die Harald Schmidt Show	Sat.1	Germany	"Cocoon"	
28 May 2002	Music Planet 2Nite	Arte	Germany	"Unravel"; "Pagan Poetry"; "Cocoon"; "All Is Full of Love"	
3 November 2002	Inside Björk	Channel 4	England	"The Anchor Song"; "Generous Palmstroke"	
8 October 2004	Friday Night with Jonathan Ross	BBC One	England	"Who Is It"	
25 – 29 October 2004 (Note: Separate performances were aired during the week. Recorded on 15 October 2004.)	Album de la Semaine	Canal+	France	"Sonnets/Unrealities XI"; "Show Me Forgiveness"; "Pleasure Is All Mine"; "Desired Constellation"; "Who Is It"; "Vökuró"	
21 April 2007	Saturday Night Live	NBC	United States	"Earth Intruders"; "Wanderlust"	
8 June 2007	Later... with Jools Holland	BBC Two	England	"Earth Intruders"; "The Anchor Song"; "Declare Independence"	
27 September 2007	Late Night with Conan O'Brien	NBC	United States	"Wanderlust"	
27 February 2011	Átta Raddir	RÚV	Iceland	"Pleasure Is All Mine"; "Hjá Lygnri Móðu"; "Immature"; "Aurora"; "Oceania"; "Cover Me"; "Sun in My Mouth"; "Where Is the Line"	
22 November 2011	Later... with Jools Holland	BBC Two	England	"Crystalline"; "Thunderbolt" (Note: Aired on 25 November 2011.); "Cosmogony"	
31 January 2012	The Colbert Report	Comedy Central	United States	"Cosmogony"	
22 May 2018	Later... with Jools Holland	BBC Two	England	"Courtship"; "The Anchor Song"; "The Gate" (Note: Aired on 26 May 2018.); "Blissing Me"	

== Radio broadcasts ==
Date	Show	Station	Country	Performed song(s)	Ref.
2 March 2002	Jonathan Ross Show	BBC Radio 2	England	"Cocoon"	
12 June 2003 (Note: Recorded on 11 June 2003 live from Sónar, Barcelona, Spain.)	Gilles Peterson Show	BBC Radio 1	England	"Heirloom"; "Generous Palmstroke"; "Síðasta Ég"; "It's in Our Hands" (Soft Pink Truth Mix)	
10 October 2004	Gilles Peterson Show	BBC Radio 1	England	"Pleasure Is All Mine"; "Show Me Forgiveness"; "Sonnets/Unrealities XI"; "Vökuró"; "Who Is It" (Note: This performance was released on Gilles Peterson Presents the BBC Sessions Vol. 1 (2005).)	
12 April 2011 (Note: These performances were recorded during a BBC Radio 1 Session in 1997.)	Gideon Coe Show	BBC Radio 6 Music	England	"Immature"; "Pluto"	

== Web performances ==
Date	Event	Venue	Location	Performed song(s)	Ref.
21 May 2001	Vespertine world tour rehearsal webcast	The Loft	New York City, United States	"Pagan Poetry"; "Unison"; "All Is Full of Love"; "Unravel"; "Aurora"; "Generous Palmstroke"; "It's Not Up to You"	
16 May 2003	Greatest Hits tour rehearsal webcast	Loftkastalinn Theatre	Reykjavík, Iceland	"Pagan Poetry"; "Scary"; "5 Years"	
28 June 2016 (Note: Part of Björk Digital.)	Virtual reality livestreaming	Miraikan	Tokyo, Japan	"Quicksand"	
2 December 2022 (Note: Recorded during the 2022 Fagradalsfjall eruption.)	A cappella live video	Fagradalsfjall	Reykjanes Peninsula, Iceland	"Sorrowful Soil"	

== Guest appearances ==
Date	Event	Venue	Location	Performed song(s)	Ref.
8 February 1991	808 State concert	Lídó	Reykjavík, Iceland	"Ooops"	
9 February 1991	808 State concert	Lídó	Reykjavík, Iceland	"Ooops"	
16 March 1991	808 State concert	GMEX	Manchester, England	"Ooops"; "Qmart"	
26 May 1991	808 State concert	Lídó	Reykjavík, Iceland	"Ooops"; "Qmart"	
14 September 1991	808 State concert	Long Beach Convention Center	Long Beach, United States	"Ooops"; "Qmart"	
15 September 1991	808 State concert	Club dv8	San Francisco, United States	"Ooops"; "Qmart"	
1 July 1994	Underworld concert (part of Roskilde Festival)	Festivalpladsen	Roskilde, Denmark	"Human Behaviour" (Underworld Mix)	
4 August 1996	Arnold Schoenberg's Pierrot Lunaire conducted by Kent Nagano (part of Verbier Festival)	Salle des Combins	Verbier, Switzerland	"Mondestrunken"; "Colombine"; "Der Dandy"; "Eine blasse Wäscherin"; "Valse de Chopin"; "Madonna"; "Der kranke Mond"; "Galgenlied"	
16 April 1998	Concert for the benefit of the Walden Woods Project and the Thoreau Institute (Note: Selections from this concert were released on Stormy Weather (1998).)	Wiltern Theatre	Los Angeles, United States	"Gloomy Sunday"; "The Love That Went Out of Style"; "What Is This Thing Called Love?" (with Joni Mitchell)	
4 December 1998	Brodsky Quartet concert	St George's Church	Bristol, England	"My Funny Valentine"; "It's Oh So Quiet"; "Hunter"; "Jóga"; "Anyone Who Had a Heart"	
31 December 1999	Voices of Europe Choir New Year's Party	Perlan	Reykjavík, Iceland	"You've Been Flirting Again"; "The Anchor Song"	
6 November 2005	Meredith Monk tribute concert	Carnegie Hall	New York City, United States	"Gotham Lullaby"	
7 January 2006	Hætta! Festival	Laugardalshöll	Reykjavík, Iceland	"Vökuró"; "Show Me Forgiveness"; "Generous Palmstroke"	
14 March 2007	Mattias Mimoun concert	Le Baron	Paris, France	"No Limit"	
28 June 2008	Sigur Rós concert (part of the Náttúra concert)	Laugardalur Park	Reykjavík, Iceland	"Gobbledigook" (on drums)	
10 August 2008	Toumani Diabaté concert (part of Expo 2008)	Amphitheatre 43	Zaragoza, Spain	"Hope"; "Softly"	
23 December 2008	Christmas Calendar project	Nordic House	Reykjavík, Iceland	"Það á að gefa börnum brauð"; "Gilsbakkaþula"; "Jólasveinar Ganga Um Gólf"; "Jólasveinavísur"	
8 May 2009	Housing Works concert (with Dirty Projectors) (Note: Selections from this concert were released on Mount Wittenberg Orca: Expanded Edition (2023).)	Housing Works Bookstore Café	New York City, United States	"On and Ever Onward"; "Sharing Orb"; "All We Are"	
19 July 2010	Press conference to protest HS Orka planned sale	Nordic House	Reykjavík, Iceland	"Hjá Lygnri Móðu"; "Vertebræ by Vertebræ"; "Oceania"	
20 September 2010	Alexander McQueen memorial service	St Paul's Cathedral	London, England	"Gloomy Sunday"	
6 – 8 January 2011	The Voice of the People karaoke marathon	Nordic House	Reykjavík, Iceland	"Three Wheels on My Wagon" (with Ómar Ragnarsson); "Love Will Tear Us Apart"; "Declare Independence"	
18 March 2014	Stopp! - Gætum Garðsins	Harpa	Reykjavík, Iceland	"Jóga"; "Sonnets/Unrealities XI"; "Mutual Core"	
27 September 2019	Arca performance (Mutant;Faith – Act 3: Ripples)	The Shed	New York City, United States	"Afterwards"	

== DJ sets ==
Date	Event	Venue	Location	Ref.
31 March 1998	Mix for The Breezeblock		—N/a	
9 June 2004	Index Magazine June issue party	168 Delancey Street	New York City, United States	
26 October 2004	Mix for The Breezeblock		—N/a	
13 May 2006	—N/a	Tonight Josephine	London, England	
21 June 2006	—N/a	Stud bar	San Francisco, United States	
29 July 2009	Mix for NPR's All Songs Considered		—N/a	
2 May 2010	Rites of Spring: Benefit for Haiti	Above the Auto Parts Store	New York City, United States	
19 July 2013	Pitchfork Music Festival aftershow	Lincoln Hall	Chicago, United States	
24 May 2014	—N/a	Saint Vitus bar	New York City, United States	
4 August 2014	—N/a	King's Head Members Club	London, England	
30 January 2015	—N/a	Good Room club	New York City, United States	
18 February 2015	Mix for Rinse FM (with Tri Angle Records)		—N/a	
15 May 2015	Tri Angle Records fifth anniversary	23 Wall Street	New York City, United States	
30 May 2015	—N/a	Saint Vitus bar	New York City, United States	
31 October 2015	Halloween party (with Arca)	Rough Trade	London, England	
3 June 2016	Vivid Sydney	Carriageworks	Sydney, Australia	
4 June 2016	Vivid Sydney	Carriageworks	Sydney, Australia	
29 June 2016	VR in Music – 18 Days Experiment	Miraikan	Tokyo, Japan	
30 June 2016	VR in Music – 18 Days Experiment	Miraikan	Tokyo, Japan	
25 October 2016	Red Bull Music Academy	Cirque Éloize	Montreal, Canada	
26 October 2016	Red Bull Music Academy	Cirque Éloize	Montreal, Canada	
16 December 2016	Day for Night	Barbara Jordan Post Office	Houston, United States	
17 December 2016	Day for Night	Barbara Jordan Post Office	Houston, United States	
15 March 2017	Hyperdub Ø monthly clubnight	Corsica Studios	London, England	
6 April 2017	WARP11 (with Arca)	Foto Museo Cuatro Caminos	Mexico City, Mexico	
9 June 2017	RuPaul's Drag Race party (with Robin Carolan)	The Rosemont	New York City, United States	
14 June 2017	Sónar	Fira de Barcelona	Barcelona, Spain	
3 July 2017	Iris van Herpen tenth anniversary	Salò Club	Paris, France	
15 September 2017	"The Gate" release party (promoted by Nowness)	180 The Strand	London, England	
20 September 2017	Gucci party at Milan Fashion Week	Porta D'oro Club	Milan, Italy	
16 November 2017	Mix for Mixmag		—N/a	
5 December 2017	Art Basel	Mana Wynwood	Miami Beach, United States	
12 January 2018	Mix for NTS Radio		—N/a	
19 December 2018	Store clearance	Smekkleysa record store	Reykjavík, Iceland	
11 April 2019	Annual school dance	Barnamúsíkskóli	Reykjavík, Iceland	
17 June 2019	Smengi #6	Smekkleysa record store	Reykjavík, Iceland	
8 November 2019	Le Guess Who?	TivoliVredenburg	Utrecht, Netherlands	
24 February 2021	Mix for Sonos Radio: 21 years worth of wave files liquidated into a stream		—N/a	
29 May 2021	Björk x Ogolúgó	Hannesarholt	Reykjavík, Iceland	
5 June 2021	Björk x Ogolúgó	Hannesarholt	Reykjavík, Iceland	
12 June 2021	Björk x Ogolúgó	Hannesarholt	Reykjavík, Iceland	
19 June 2021	Björk x Ogolúgó	Hannesarholt	Reykjavík, Iceland	
2 October 2021	Björk x Ogolúgó	Hannesarholt	Reykjavík, Iceland	
24 October 2021	Björk x Ogolúgó	Hannesarholt	Reykjavík, Iceland	
13 May 2022	Fundraising Celebration	Höfuðstöðin	Reykjavík, Iceland	
10 October 2022	Fossora release party (promoted by AnOther Magazine)	Victoria House	London, England	
12 October 2022	35th European Film Awards afterparty	Harpa	Reykjavík, Iceland	
17 December 2022	Hátíðni óhljóðs ó’friðar 2.0	Smekkleysa record store	Reykjavík, Iceland	
26 December 2022	Mix for BBC Radio 6 Music's Festive Takeover		—N/a	
4 February 2023	Máni I – Snjótungl/Storm Moon	Smekkleysa record store	Reykjavík, Iceland	
6 May 2023	Smekkleysa Flower Moon	Smekkleysa record store	Reykjavík, Iceland	
3 June 2023	Hvalir Kvalir – Strawberry Moon	Smekkleysa record store	Reykjavík, Iceland	
7 June 2023 (Note: These DJ sets were organized following the cancellation of the Reykjavík dates of Cornucopia. Two sets were played on each day.)	Fan exclusive and intimate DJ experience	Höfuðstöðin	Reykjavík, Iceland	
11 June 2023	Fan exclusive and intimate DJ experience	Höfuðstöðin	Reykjavík, Iceland	
13 June 2023	Fan exclusive and intimate DJ experience	Höfuðstöðin	Reykjavík, Iceland	
8 July 2023	Mánakvöld – Buck Moon	Smekkleysa record store	Reykjavík, Iceland	
5 August 2023	Mánakvöld – Sturgeon Moon (with Glupsk)	Smekkleysa record store	Reykjavík, Iceland	
5 October 2023	Reykjavík International Film Festival	Edition Hotel	Reykjavík, Iceland	
28 October 2023	Mánakvöld – Hunter's Moon (with Sega Bodega, Aleph and Ronja)	Smekkleysa record store	Reykjavík, Iceland	
27 January 2024	Mánakvöld – Wolf Moon (with Arca)	Smekkleysa record store	Reykjavík, Iceland	
3 March 2024	The Light Comes in the Name of the Voice (with Arca)	Bourse de commerce	Paris, France	
30 March 2024	Mánakvöld – Worm Moon	Smekkleysa record store	Reykjavík, Iceland	
18 April 2024	Iceland pavilion at 60th Venice Biennale	Venetian Arsenal	Venice, Italy	
10 May 2024	Under the K Bridge (with Shygirl, Sega Bodega, Mun Sing, Jlin and Eartheater)	Kosciuszko Bridge	New York City, United States	
22 June 2024	Mánakvöld – Strawberry Moon (with Mica Levi)	Smekkleysa record store	Reykjavík, Iceland	
14 September 2024	Exos Invites (with Aleph)	Radar Club	Reykjavík, Iceland	
8 December 2024	Cornucopia: The Book release party	Rough Trade	London, England	
13 December 2024	Mánakvöld – Cold Moon (with Aleph and Joakim)	Smekkleysa record store	Reykjavík, Iceland	
31 December 2024	Apple Music Live: NYE livestream	The Cause	London, England	
29 March 2025	Mánakvöld – Under the Blue Light (with Ronja)	Smekkleysa record store	Reykjavík, Iceland	
8 April 2025	Vans Checkered Future at Milan Design Week	Triennale di Milano	Milan, Italy	
17 June 2025	Smengi #15 x Mánakvöld	Smekkleysa record store	Reykjavík, Iceland	
12 July 2025	Mánakvöld – Buck Moon x Surrealism 101	Smekkleysa record store	Reykjavík, Iceland	
6 September 2025	Mánakvöld – Corn Moon	Smekkleysa record store	Reykjavík, Iceland	
7 May 2026	Iceland pavilion at 61st Venice Biennale	Docks Cantieri Cucchini	Venice, Italy	
12 August 2026	Echolalia Festival	Víðistaðatún	Hafnarfjörður, Iceland	
12 September 2026	Dissonanze Festival	Auditorium Parco della Musica	Rome, Italy	

== Cancelled shows ==
Scheduled date	Event	Venue / Network	Location	Reason	Ref.
16 December 1997	Late Show with David Letterman	CBS	New York City, United States	Cancelled due to kidney infection.	
13 February 1998	TFI Friday	Channel 4	London, England	Björk's performance of "Bachelorette" was cancelled due to her refusal to be interviewed.	
12 April 1998	Tour with Radiohead	Maple Leaf Gardens	Toronto, Canada	Cancelled due to staging and production difficulties.	
13 April 1998	Tour with Radiohead	Molson Centre	Montreal, Canada	Cancelled due to staging and production difficulties.	
15 April 1998	Tour with Radiohead	Worcester Centrum Centre	Worcester, United States	Cancelled due to staging and production difficulties.	
17 April 1998	Tour with Radiohead	Radio City Music Hall	New York City, United States	Cancelled due to staging and production difficulties.	
26 August 2000	Tour with Voices of Europe Choir	Hallgrímskirkja	Reykjavík, Iceland	Björk's performances were cancelled due to "increasing media frenzy" over her appearance, which was scheduled to consists of only 3 songs during the 120 minutes of show from the choir.	
27 August 2000	Tour with Voices of Europe Choir	Hallgrímskirkja	Reykjavík, Iceland	Björk's performances were cancelled due to "increasing media frenzy" over her appearance, which was scheduled to consists of only 3 songs during the 120 minutes of show from the choir.	
29 August 2000	Tour with Voices of Europe Choir	Centre for Fine Arts	Brussels, Belgium	Björk's performances were cancelled due to "increasing media frenzy" over her appearance, which was scheduled to consists of only 3 songs during the 120 minutes of show from the choir.	
31 August 2000	Tour with Voices of Europe Choir	St. John's Church	Helsinki, Finland	Björk's performances were cancelled due to "increasing media frenzy" over her appearance, which was scheduled to consists of only 3 songs during the 120 minutes of show from the choir.	
1 September 2000	Tour with Voices of Europe Choir	Charles's Church	Tallinn, Estonia	Björk's performances were cancelled due to "increasing media frenzy" over her appearance, which was scheduled to consists of only 3 songs during the 120 minutes of show from the choir.	
3 September 2000	Tour with Voices of Europe Choir	St. Catherine's Church	Warsaw, Poland	Björk's performances were cancelled due to "increasing media frenzy" over her appearance, which was scheduled to consists of only 3 songs during the 120 minutes of show from the choir.	
5 September 2000	Tour with Voices of Europe Choir	Opéra d'Avignon	Avignon, France	Björk's performances were cancelled due to "increasing media frenzy" over her appearance, which was scheduled to consists of only 3 songs during the 120 minutes of show from the choir.	
7 September 2000	Tour with Voices of Europe Choir	Europauditorium	Bologna, Italy	Björk's performances were cancelled due to "increasing media frenzy" over her appearance, which was scheduled to consists of only 3 songs during the 120 minutes of show from the choir.	
10 September 2000	Tour with Voices of Europe Choir	Auditorio de Galicia	Santiago de Compostela, Spain	Björk's performances were cancelled due to "increasing media frenzy" over her appearance, which was scheduled to consists of only 3 songs during the 120 minutes of show from the choir.	
12 September 2000	Tour with Voices of Europe Choir	Grieg Hall	Bergen, Norway	Björk's performances were cancelled due to "increasing media frenzy" over her appearance, which was scheduled to consists of only 3 songs during the 120 minutes of show from the choir.	
13 September 2000	Tour with Voices of Europe Choir	Grieg Hall	Bergen, Norway	Björk's performances were cancelled due to "increasing media frenzy" over her appearance, which was scheduled to consists of only 3 songs during the 120 minutes of show from the choir.	
2 October 2001	The Rosie O'Donnell Show	Syndicated	New York City, United States	Undisclosed reasons.	
21 October 2004	Late Show with David Letterman	CBS	New York City, United States	Undisclosed reasons.	
22 November 2024	Spark Epoch DJ set at Luxembourg Art Week opening night	Casino Luxembourg	Luxembourg City, Luxembourg	Cancelled due to unforeseen circumstances.	

== Notes ==
Live releases

== Bibliography ==
- Pytlik, Mark (2003). Björk: Wow and Flutter. ECW Press. ISBN 1-55022-556-1.
- Jónsson, Ásmundur; Björk (2003). Björk: Live Book. One Little Indian Records.
