= Homogenic Live =

Live album by Björk
- Released: 1 June 2004
- Recorded: 1997–1998
- Genre: Electronica
- Length: 68:58
- Label: One Little Indian
- Producer: Various

Björk chronology
Post Live (2004)	Homogenic Live (2004)	Vespertine Live (2004)

Homogenic Live is a live album by Icelandic singer Björk, collecting her favorite performances from her 1997–1999 Homogenic tour. It was Björk's first tour to have soundboard recordings and thus the first of her live CDs to feature a wide variety of performances taken from different dates and venues throughout a single tour. Originally released in the five-disc Live Box set in 2003, Homogenic Live was later released separately on 1 June 2004 by One Little Indian records.

== Background ==
Björk did not have soundboard recordings for her first two concert tours. When compiling material for those tours’ corresponding live albums, she had to use audio taken from pre-mixed videotaped performances.

Beginning with the Homogenic tour, she began collecting soundboard recordings with each section of her touring band mixed separately. During the Homogenic tour, several microphones captured the Icelandic String Octet (as evidenced on the concert film, Live in Cambridge) while Mark Bell's electronic equipment was fed directly into the mixer. This recording technique allows for a greater clarity of sound and a certain deal of control in the mixing process, allowing the audio technician to raise or lower the different elements, be they the performer's vocals, the different sections of the touring band or even the crowd. Homogenic Live is Björk's first live album to be mixed in such a way.

== Reception ==
Critics praised Homogenic Live. Comparing it to Björk's previous live albums, Scott Plagenhoef for Pitchfork complimented the stripped down strings and electronics setting, saying it "could have left (Björk) potentially vulnerable, but she fills the empty space with the full force of her voice... In the end, the renditions seem more assured and well-conceived" than on both Debut Live and Post Live. AllMusic wrote that "the relatively spare instrumentation allows Björk to take her songs down slightly different paths while retaining the heart of the studio recordings" and that "Björk's voice shines throughout". PopMatters criticised the slew of releases Björk was putting out at the time but agreed that the live album was a historical record "of the beauty and majesty of Björk's voice and her compositions", while ultimately concluding that as a companion project to its "landmark" parent album Homogenic, it "failed to offer any new insights into the inner workings of Björk and her live experience".

== Track listing ==
Homogenic Live track listing
No.	Title	Writer(s)	Recorded	Length
1.	"Vísur Vatnsenda-Rósu"	Rósa Guðmundsdóttir; Jón Ásgeirsson	Cambridge, 2 December 1998	1:52
2.	"Hunter"	Björk	Paris, 6 June 1998	4:17
3.	"You've Been Flirting Again"	Björk	Washington, D.C., 15 May 1998	3:34
4.	"Isobel"	Björk; Marius de Vries; Nellee Hooper; Sjón	Prague, 13 June 1998	4:55
5.	"All Neon Like"	Björk	Spain, 9 August 1998	4:56
6.	"Possibly Maybe"	Björk	Spain, 9 August 1998	5:43
7.	"5 Years"	Björk	London, 17 September 1997	4:09
8.	"Come to Me"	Björk	Prague, 13 June 1998	4:20
9.	"Immature"	Björk	Tourhout, 4 June 1998	2:59
10.	"I Go Humble"	Björk; Mark Bell	Vienna, 14 June 1998	4:24
11.	"Bachelorette"	Björk; Sjón	Later with Jools Holland, 29 November 1997	5:17
12.	"Human Behaviour"	Björk; Hooper	Montreux, 10 June 1998	3:52
13.	"Pluto"	Björk; Bell	Prague, 13 June 1998	3:55
14.	"Jóga"	Björk; Sjón	Later with Jools Holland, 29 November 1997	4:25
15.	"So Broken"	Björk	Later with Jools Holland, 16 October 1998	4:27
16.	"The Anchor Song"	Björk	Cambridge, 2 December 1998	5:53
Total length:				68:58

Notes

- "You've Been Flirting Again" included here is the Icelandic version of the song.
- "I Go Humble" interpolates "Wanna Be Startin' Somethin'", written and performed by Michael Jackson.
- "The Anchor Song" interpolates "Um Akkeri", written and performed by Björk.
