= Björk and The Brodsky Quartet at the Union Chapel =

1999 one-off show by Björk and the Brodsky Quartet

At the Union Chapel
- One-off concert by Björk
- Location: Union Chapel; Islington, London
- Date: 9–11 December 1999

In December 1999, Icelandic avant-pop singer Björk and acclaimed British string ensemble the Brodsky Quartet gave two intimate, stand-alone concerts at London's historic Union Chapel. Björk sang a collection of songs from her first three studio albums, Debut, Post, and Homogenic, all newly arranged for string quartet by the Brodsky, plus covers of songs by Elvis Costello and Dionne Warwick, among others. The two concerts, held on 9 and 11 December 1999, were critically praised by the London press but have never received an official release outside of a small selection of performances found on Björk's 2002 box set, Family Tree.

== Background and early collaborations ==
The Brodsky Quartet is a classical string quartet formed in 1972 by siblings Michael and Jacqueline Thomas and their friends Ian Belton and Alexander Robertson. Paul Cassidy replaced Robertson in 1982. They rose to prominence in the pop/alternative world in 1993 when they collaborated with celebrated British rocker Elvis Costello on his 14th studio album, The Juliet Letters. It is through this album that Björk, who found success as a solo artist in 1993 after years fronting bands in Iceland, discovered the Brodsky.

Björk first approached the Brodsky Quartet in 1995, eager for them to rearrange one of her songs. The string quartet chose “Hyperballad” from Björk's newest album at the time, Post. The remix was first released as a b-side on the singer's 1995 single, “It's Oh So Quiet”, before being featured on Björk's 1996 remix album, Telegram. The Brodsky's version of “Hyperballad” was later included in the quartet's 1999 compilation, Best of Brodsky Quartet.

The following year, the Brodsky served as opening and supporting act on select UK dates of Björk's Post tour, the singer's two year concert series in support of her second studio album. The Brodsky later accompanied Björk to Norway in 1997 when the Icelandic singer became the first pop star to receive the Nordic Council Music Prize. They performed the Brodsky's rendition of “Hyperballad”, which Björk sang in her native Icelandic.

Also in 1997, Björk, the Brodsky, and German DJ/musician Alec Empire of Atari Teenage Riot collaborated on an EP which was to feature four tracks: "April", "5 Years", "Sod Off", and "Joga". An article from TRACK Magazine from 1 September 1997 quotes Björk as saying, "I love what Alec Empire did on Nicolette's album so much that I finally sent him four tracks featuring the Brodsky Quartet." News about this planned EP continued into the year 2000 when it was reported that the EP was nearing completion with a targeted release date of late 2000. Empire told NME, "It’s been planned since last summer and now I want to nail it down over the next two or three weeks. What I’m trying to do is find a good balance between what I do and what [the Brodsky Quartet] do...and Bjork’s very powerful voice, the main thing is to find a balance." But by early 2001, it was reported that the release of the EP was pushed back and to this day it has never been released.

As a thank you to St. George's Church in Bristol, England for their years of support and to close out their two-year residency at the church, The Brodsky Quartet invited Björk, by then a major international superstar, to share St. George's stage with them on 4 December 1998. The Brodsky created new arrangements of many Björk songs, taken mostly from her 1997 record, Homogenic, and the show was so spontaneous that the singer didn't hear the new compositions until that very afternoon. The concert itself was almost completely acoustic with Björk singing without the amplification of a microphone, though the show was reportedly recorded. In his review for The Independent, journalist Phil Johnson was extremely positive, referring to Björk as “arguably the most interesting pop artist of the age” and predicted that the concert would probably be “the best” show he and the rest of the audience would ever see, an outcome “no-one could have predicted.” Seating was extremely limited but in his review, Johnson wrote that “the 500 seats could have been sold 10 times over” and noted Roni Size, Krust and Portishead in attendance.

Songs known to have been performed that night include “It’s Oh So Quiet”, “Hunter”, “Jóga”, popular jazz standard “My Funny Valentine”, and a cover of “Anyone Who Had a Heart”, written by Burt Bacharach and originally recorded by Dionne Warwick. A release of this concert never materialized.

== Union Chapel shows ==
A year after the Bristol show, Björk and the Brodsky Quartet performed two sold-out concerts at London's Union Chapel on 9 and 11 December 1999. Again, Björk and the quartet performed without direct microphone amplification. Microphones were instead placed overhead to capture the performance, and the stage was lit entirely by candlelight. Björk appeared on stage in a pink Comme des Garçons gingham dress and leggings, barefoot, and according to one review seemed “frightened of making too much noise in the consecrated surroundings.” Björk debuted a new song, “I’ve Seen It All”, which would be nominated for an Oscar in 2001 for best original song from the film musical, Dancer In the Dark, in which she starred.

The Brodsky arranged additional songs for Björk at the Union Chapel. Among the new additions was Meredith Monk's 1981 composition, “Gotham Lullaby”. Monk eventually heard Björk's rendition through a bootleg MP3 given to her by one of her students and admired how the Icelander “captured the essence of the piece” without simply mimicking the original recording. This led to a friendship between the two avant garde artists and Björk went on to perform the song selectively during her 2001 Vespertine world tour, at Coachella in 2002, once on her 2003 Greatest Hits tour and finally in a 2005 40th anniversary tribute concert to Monk at Carnegie Hall with Monk in attended. Björk dedicated her 11 September 2001 performance of “Gotham Lullaby” in Germany to the city of Manhattan on the day of the 9/11 terrorist attacks.

Björk again covered “Anyone Who Had Heart” with the Brodsky and added Petula Clark's popular 60s hit, “Downtown”, which was considered an evening highlight. In total, the Brodsky arranged 23 songs specifically for Björk, including “My Funny Valentine” which was only performed at the December 1998 concert in Bristol. The two Elvis Costello covers (“Who Do You Think You Are” and “Why”) were originally co-written with the Brodsky Quartet for Costello's studio album, The Juliet Letters, and the quartet performed the same arrangements. The Brodsky's rendition of the jazz standard, “Like Someone In Love” featured on Björk's Debut album, was heralded as “sublime” by The Independent and began with an extract from Johann Sebastian Bach's first cello suite. Björk's hit cover of “It’s Oh So Quiet” playfully began with the Brodsky performing “Silent Night” for string quartet before Björk shushed the room in the 1995 hit song's signature sound.

Of her original material, the Brodsky rearranged, among others, “Unravel” and “All Neon Like” from 1997's Homogenic. The Brodsky's versions of Björk's “5 Years” and “The Modern Things” were praised by the press, with the latter being considered an evening turning point where both vocalist and string quartet “develop into a coherent whole”.

In an interview with BBC Radio 1, Brodsky member Paul Cassidy was extremely complimentary of Björk's vocal technique, saying, “I can’t think of anything like it in any form of music... For instance in “The Anchor Song” at the Union Chapel, she did something that was like the depths of the ocean, like an anchor hitting the bed of the sea. Everyone after that moment was just open mouthed.”

A note posted at the venue during both nights notified attendees of “LIVE FILMING – AT THE UNION CHAPEL, ISLINGTON, LONDON” and continued with, “Your presence here today constitutes your express consent to the filming and recording of your likeness for use in the above mentioned film.” Though both nights were recorded, the concerts have never seen a proper release. A live CD was rumored in the summer of 2000 but the release never materialized. 9 songs were eventually released on Family Tree, a box set featuring rare and unreleased material from the first 10 years of Björk's solo career. However, not all of these tracks are from the Union Chapel gigs; some of the songs are studio recordings made with the Brodsky in 2000 as per info supplied in the liner notes. Some 10 years later, Björk and the Brodsky's version of “Gotham Lullaby” was released on the compilation Monk Mix, a collection of remixes and interpretations of the music of Meredith Monk.

== Setlists ==
9 December 1999

1. "Unravel"
2. "All Neon Like"
3. "Cover Me"
4. "I've Seen It All"
5. "Gotham Lullaby"
6. "Come to Me"
7. "Who Do You Think You Are?"
8. "The Modern Things"
9. "Hyperballad"
10. "Like Someone In Love"
11. "Sod Off"
12. "5 Years"
13. "Why?"
14. "Possibly Maybe"
15. "The Anchor Song"
16. "Jóga"
17. "Bachelorette"
18. "You've Been Flirting Again"
19. "Play Dead"
20. "Anyone Who Had a Heart"
21. "Downtown"
22. "It's Oh So Quiet"

11 December 1999

1. "Unravel"
2. "Jóga"
3. "Cover Me"
4. "All Neon Like"
5. "Gotham Lullaby"
6. "I've Seen It All"
7. "You've Been Flirting Again"
8. "Come to Me"
9. "Like Someone In Love"
10. "5 Years"
11. "Hyperballad"
12. "Why?"
13. "Possibly Maybe"
14. "The Anchor Song"
15. "Bachelorette"
16. "Play Dead"
17. "Hunter"
18. "Anyone Who Had a Heart"
19. "Downtown"
20. "It's Oh So Quiet"

== Further collaborations ==
Björk and the Brodsky Quartet continued their collaboration into the 2000s. Together in 1999, the two acts commissioned a new piece from British composer John Tavener called “Prayer of the Heart”. The Brodsky contacted Tavener to write something for Björk after she revealed to them how much she enjoyed the composer's work. Said Tavener about the idea of writing for the Icelandic star, "I don't see why not. She's far more intelligent than most classical singers." Björk described the collaboration as “magical” and “fifty times more than I already had dreamed of”. The 15-minute composition premiered in 2003 at the first major London exhibition of American photographer Nan Goldin entitled Devil’s Playground, specifically in a slide show portion called “Heart Beat”. The exhibit was hosted at The Whitechapel Gallery from 24 January – 31 March 2003. The song was later featured in a double CD compilation entitled, John Tavener – A Portrait. In the album's liner notes, Tavener described Björk's voice as “raw, primordial” and admitted he “was very attracted to this sound… [The composition] couldn’t possibly be sung by anybody else but her.”

In 2007, Björk supplied the mono-syllabic voice of the main character in the short film, Anna and the Moods, which was commissioned by the Brodsky Quartet. Music for the film was written by Julian Nott while the film itself was written by the Icelandic poet, Sjón, a frequent collaborator of Björk's.

To this day, the Brodsky Quartet continues to perform Björk's compositions during their concerts.

== Reception ==
Björk's concerts at the Union Chapel received universal acclaim by the London press. Writing for The Guardian, critic Maddy Costa dubbed it “A heavenly experience” and said, “Reviews can’t do Björk justice; listening to her records can’t prepare you for the scintillating wonder of her voice,” and that the singer “emits such indescribable sounds.” Costa also noted how inventive Björk has been in recreating her old songs live and complimented the Brodsky in this regard: “For all their sensible demeanour, The Brodskys are as mischievous as Björk.” She ended her review by saying, “I’ll still be talking about this when I’m 73.”

Fiona Sturges of The Independent called the show “sublime” and complimented the pairing of Björk and the Brodsky Quartet as “a seemingly unlikely pairing until you take into account the Icelander’s trademark eclectism.” Complementing the orchestral textures of Björk's original studio albums and her “versatile compositions” – qualities attributed to her training as a classical musician – Sturges was impressed with the use of “something as conventional as a string quartet.” She described the mood at the beginning of the concert as “one of uncertainty… as if (Björk is) frightened of making too much noise” at the chapel and that the strings seemed “more of an accessory than an integral part of the proceedings”, creating an overall “polite” atmosphere. It wasn't until the Brodsky's reworking of Björk's “The Modern Things”, an electronic song rearranged for strident strings, when the merging of voice and string quartet became a “complete whole.” “Her voice is extraordinary,” she continued, and credited the Brodsky's “generously restrained performance” for giving “Björk the space to reach new heights of perfection.”

The Union Chapel described Björk's concerts at the venue as being among its most memorable performances.”

== Cancelled live album ==
Several news outlets at the time reported that the Union Chapel concerts were scheduled for a live CD release which never materialized. However, a work-in-progress reference CDr has made its way into the collector's market and gives a glimpse into what a live album would have looked like. The reported inclusion of Petula Clark's "Downtown" is missing from this reference disc.

- At the Union Chapel (Unreleased CD)
1. "Unravel" — 3:35
2. "All Neon Like" — 5:05
3. "Cover Me" — 2:47
4. "Gotham Lullaby" — 3:53
5. "Come to Me" — 2:54
6. "Who Do You Think You Are" — 3:04
7. "The Modern Things" — 3:43
8. "Hyperballad" — 3:49
9. "Like Someone In Love" — 3:30
10. "Why" — 1:34
11. "Possibly Maybe" — 4:52
12. "The Anchor Song" — 3:42
13. "The Anchor Song - Edit" — 0:29
14. "Bachelorette" — 4:46
15. "You've Been Flirting Again" — 2:31
16. "Hunter" — 4:19
17. "Bachelorette" — 5:38
18. "Hunter - Edit Section" — 0:54
19. "All Neon Like" — 5:05
20. "Hyperballad" — 4:03

While no full-length release ever materialized, some compilation albums have been issued which feature selections from the Union Chapel concerts.

== Track listing ==
This list contains all known official releases featuring Björk and the Brodsky Quartet at the Union Chapel material. Since all are compilations, tracks in italics indicate songs recorded at the Union Chapel.

- Björk - The Times Promotional CD (2001)
1. "Venus as a Boy" — 4:44
2. "Human Behaviour" — 4:15
3. "Hyperballad" — 5:26
4. "Isobel" — 5:51
5. "Joga" — 5:09
6. "All Is Full of Love" — 4:53
7. "Hidden Place" — 5:31
8. "Undo" — 5:51
9. "Possibly Maybe" (Live At The Union Chapel) — 5:00
- Family Tree CD box set - Strings (discs 4 & 5)
1. "Unravel" (with the Brodsky Quartet) — 3:38
2. "Cover Me" (with the Brodsky Quartet) — 2:50
3. "Possibly Maybe" (with the Brodsky Quartet) — 4:55
4. "The Anchor Song" (with the Brodsky Quartet) — 3:44
5. "Hunter" (with the Brodsky Quartet) — 4:31
6. "All Neon Like" (with the Brodsky Quartet) — 5:07
7. "I've Seen It All" (with the Brodsky Quartet) — 5:59
8. "Bachelorette" (with the Brodsky Quartet) — 5:09
9. "Play Dead" (with the Brodsky Quartet) — 3:25
- Monk Mix: Remixes & Interpretations Of Music By Meredith Monk CD 1
1. "Gotham Lullaby" (Björk with the Brodsky Quartet) — 3:54
2. "Caldera Chimera" (Gabriel Prokofiev Remix - Meredith Monk) — 5:13
3. "Click Song #1" (Don Byron) — 1:56
4. "Double Fiesta" (Meredith Monk & Bang on a Can All-Stars) — 5:34
5. "Astronaut Anthem" (Sakamoto Remix - Meredith Monk) — 5:23
6. "Shaking" (Lukas Ligeti/Pyrolator Remix - Meredith Monk) — 4:10
7. "Last Song" (Caetano Veloso) — 6:51
8. "Fat Stream" (Nico Muhly’s Piano Homage) — 4:03
9. "Wheel" (John Hollenbeck / Theo Bleckmann) — 5:38
10. "Scared Song" (Pamela Z) — 4:49
11. "Boat Song" (Rubin Kodheli) — 4:09
12. "Gathering" (Lee Ranaldo Remix - Meredith Monk) — 5:10
13. "Evening" (Henry Grimes Remix - Meredith Monk) — 4:16
