= Vespertine Live =

Live album by Björk
- Released: 1 June 2004
- Recorded: 2001
- Genres: Electronica; experimental; glitch pop
- Length: 74:35
- Label: One Little Indian

Björk chronology
Homogenic Live (2004)	Vespertine Live (2004)	Medúlla (2004)

Vespertine Live is a live album by Icelandic singer Björk, collecting her favourite performances from her 2001 Vespertine world tour. A companion album to 2001's critically acclaimed Vespertine, Vespertine Live was originally released in the 5 disc Live Box set in 2003 and was later released separately on 1 June 2004 by One Little Indian records.

== Background ==
In 2002, while pregnant with her second child, Björk began sifting through her hundreds of hours of archival material for a series of releases spanning previous unreleased and rare recordings (Family Tree box set) and live performances in preparation for a series of CDs chronicling her concert tours that she hoped would appease fans who were craving high quality live material. "It was a lot of work," she said, "but it fit me at the time, because I was enveloped in my nesting hormones. I was pregnant, and could turn into a librarian."

She utilised the dozens of hours of live performances she had accumulated throughout the brief Vespertine world tour to create Vespertine Live. However, unlike her previous live albums that used one performance per song, Björk decided to mix her vocals from various different performances together to achieve seamless, near-perfect versions of some of the live Vespertine songs.

The resulting album features mostly material from Vespertine, excluding the songs "Heirloom", which was not performed until 2003's Greatest Hits tour, and "Sun in My Mouth", which was not performed until 2015's Vulnicura tour. Only three of her back catalogue songs made the cut, none of which were offered on previous live albums: Homogenic's "Unravel" (which was not performed on the Homogenic tour) and "All Is Full of Love" (which did not make it onto Homogenic Live) and "I've Seen It All" from Selmasongs. The album's final song, "It's in Our Hands", was performed live throughout the Vespertine world tour despite not having been officially released until Björk's 2002 Greatest Hits album. By the time Vespertine Live was released, fans were already familiar with the song, and elements from the live recordings (in particular the clapping of the Inuit choir) found their way into the studio version of the song.

Several tracks were released before Vespertine Live was even announced. The live version of "Generous Palmstroke" appeared on the "Roots" CD of Family Tree while the live recordings of "All Is Full of Love", "Harm of Will", and "Undo" appeared on the various CD and DVD singles of "It's in Our Hands" in 2002. It was on the "It's in Our Hands" CD and DVD single liner notes that fans had their first official announcement of the then upcoming Vespertine Live album.

== Reception ==
AllMusic noted that Björk is "never content to simply recreate her studio albums onstage" and complimented her for "her unique mixture of wide-eyed innocence and tender sensuality". Pitchfork stated that, "As a recording, Vespertine Live is engaging, but as an argument for the rehabilitation of the studio album's reputation, it's downright compelling... Live, Vespertine's glitch-pop nuances are magnified... and the music box melodies are more embraceable." They concluded that Vespertine's live counterpart "could supplant its namesake in your listening rotation".

== Track listing ==
Vespertine Live track listing
No.	Title	Writer(s)	Length
1.	"Frosti"	Björk	1:23
2.	"Overture"	Björk	3:36
3.	"All Is Full of Love"	Björk	4:04
4.	"Cocoon"	Björk; Thomas Knak	4:31
5.	"Aurora"	Björk	3:44
6.	"Undo"	Björk; Knak	5:48
7.	"Unravel"	Björk; Guy Sigsworth	3:38
8.	"I've Seen It All"	Björk; Sjón; Lars von Trier	5:17
9.	"An Echo, a Stain"	Björk; Sigsworth	4:35
10.	"Generous Palmstroke"	Björk; Zeena Parkins	4:08
11.	"Hidden Place"	Björk	5:37
12.	"Pagan Poetry"	Björk	5:30
13.	"Harm of Will"	Björk; Sigsworth; Harmony Korine	4:31
14.	"It's Not up to You"	Björk	5:24
15.	"Unison"	Björk	6:22
16.	"It's in Our Hands"	Björk	6:27
Total length:			74:35

Notes

- "Frosti" is mislabelled; while "Frosti" is a music box instrumental found on Vespertine, this track is a live recording of the music box version of "Pagan Poetry" found on the "Cocoon" single.
- "All Is Full of Love" interpolates "Domestica", written and performed by Björk.
