= Live Box =

Box set by Björk
- Released: 18 August 2003
- Genre: Electronica
- Length: 241:08 (total; excluding DVD content)
- Label: One Little Indian
- Producer: Various

Björk chronology
Family Tree (2002)	Live Box (2003)	Debut Live (2004)

Professional ratings
Review scores
Source	Rating
Blender	3/5 stars
Rolling Stone	4/5 stars

Live Box is a set of 4 live CDs, a live DVD and a 36-page booklet by Icelandic musician Björk, released in August 2003. Each live CD roughly corresponds to one album in her (at the time of release) four album solo discography. The 4 live CDs were later released separately in June 2004.

== Background ==
When Björk was pregnant with her daughter Ísadóra in 2002 she decided to start sorting through the hundreds of hours of live recordings she had collected from her tours. Assisted in the process by the head of Smekkleysa, Ásmundur Jónsson, they decided on the best performances from each of the tours to include on the live albums. This release of live material was initially confirmed by the inclusion of live tracks on the "It's in Our Hands" single in 2002, credited to the "Forthcoming album Vespertine Live". This was followed by an announcement in 2003 of a distribution-deal with US record company Navarre that would include "both CDs and DVDs". Björk's official website later confirmed the release of a box set containing live recordings, not only from Vespertine but from the past ten years of Björk's solo career. Björk only started to have soundboard recordings of her live shows from the Homogenic tour onwards, so the first two discs (Debut Live and Post Live) are made up primarily of the audio from the corresponding live DVDs. Shortly before the official release, a free download of "Hyperballad" from the Post Live disc was made available on the Abercrombie Vintage website. The originally announced track listing for Post Live included 18 tracks (the final version has 13), and so would have included nearly the full audio from the Live at Shepherds Bush Empire DVD, from which the album takes most of its material.

The box set also includes a 36-page booklet featuring numerous photos and an in-depth conversation with Björk and Ásmundur in Björk's home, discussing her career, her recordings and her live tours. The box set was originally announced as a limited release of 30,000 copies, although it is still available for purchase. The individual live discs were later released separately in May 2004.

== Artwork ==
The artwork was designed by M/M Paris, whom Björk has worked extensively with since 1999's Volumen release. At the time of release many online stores displayed an incorrect earlier version of the artwork for the box set, which features alternate artwork for the Post Live and Homogenic Live albums. For the album artwork of each live album, Björk herself found a selection of different photos available on the Internet. Due to the low resolution of the image chosen for Homogenic Live, it appears pixelated on the album cover.

== Live Book ==
To accompany the release of the Live Box, a separate book was released titled Live Book. This features the interview with Ásmundur Jónsson that is also included in the 36-page booklet that comes with the Live Box, but also new interviews with Lynn Fox, Zeena Parkins, Matmos and Leila, who were all involved in Björk's 2003 tour. Although now largely out of print, the book is still available for purchase at the official Björk online store.

== Track listing ==
Disc 1 — Debut Live All tracks taken from Björk's MTV Unplugged concert on 7 November 1994 except where noted.
No.	Title	Writer(s)	Length
1.	"Human Behaviour"	Björk; Nellee Hooper	4:09
2.	"One Day"	Björk	6:09
3.	"Venus as a Boy" (Later with Jools Holland, 17 June 1995)	Björk	2:33
4.	"Come to Me"	Björk	3:45
5.	"Big Time Sensuality"	Björk; Hooper	5:08
6.	"Aeroplane"	Björk	4:03
7.	"Like Someone in Love"	Johnny Burke; Jimmy Van Heusen	4:01
8.	"Crying"	Björk; Hooper	4:12
9.	"The Anchor Song"	Björk	3:25
10.	"Violently Happy"	Björk; Hooper	5:44
Total length:			43:03

Disc 2 — Post Live All tracks recorded at Shepherd's Bush Empire on 27 February 1997 except where noted.
No.	Title	Writer(s)	Length
1.	"Headphones"	Björk; Tricky	2:58
2.	"Army of Me"	Björk; Graham Massey	4:04
3.	"One Day"	Björk	3:37
4.	"The Modern Things"	Björk; Massey	3:52
5.	"Isobel"	Björk; Marius de Vries; Hooper; Sjón	5:27
6.	"Possibly Maybe" (Later with Jools Holland, 17 June 1995)	Björk	5:22
7.	"Hyperballad" (Later with Jools Holland, 17 June 1995)	Björk	5:05
8.	"I Go Humble"	Björk; Mark Bell	4:03
9.	"Big Time Sensuality"	Björk; Hooper	4:53
10.	"Enjoy"	Björk; Tricky	3:39
11.	"I Miss You" (TFI Friday, 19 April 1996)	Björk; Howie B	3:56
12.	"It's Oh So Quiet" (Taratata, 14 December 1996)	Bert Reisfeld; Hans Lang	3:52
13.	"The Anchor Song"	Björk	3:11
Total length:			53:59

Disc 3 — Homogenic Live
No.	Title	Writer(s)	Recorded	Length
1.	"Vísur Vatnsenda-Rósu"	Rósa Guðmundsdóttir; Jón Ásgeirsson	Cambridge, 2 December 1998	1:52
2.	"Hunter"	Björk	Paris, 6 June 1998	4:17
3.	"You've Been Flirting Again"	Björk	Washington, 15 May 1998	3:34
4.	"Isobel"	Björk; de Vries; Hooper; Sjón	Prague, 13 June 1998	4:55
5.	"All Neon Like"	Björk	Spain, 9 August 1998	4:56
6.	"Possibly Maybe"	Björk	Spain, 9 August 1998	5:43
7.	"5 Years"	Björk	London, 17 September 1997	4:09
8.	"Come to Me"	Björk	Prague, 13 June 1998	4:20
9.	"Immature"	Björk	Tourhout, 4 June 1998	2:59
10.	"I Go Humble"	Björk; Bell	Vienna, 14 June 1998	4:24
11.	"Bachelorette"	Björk; Sjón	Later with Jools Holland, 29 November 1997	5:17
12.	"Human Behaviour"	Björk; Hooper	Montreux, 10 June 1998	3:52
13.	"Pluto"	Björk; Bell	Prague, 13 June 1998	3:55
14.	"Jóga"	Björk; Sjón	Later with Jools Holland, 29 November 1997	4:25
15.	"So Broken"	Björk	Later with Jools Holland, 16 October 1998	4:27
16.	"The Anchor Song"	Björk	Cambridge, 2 December 1998	5:53
Total length:				68:58

Disc 4 — Vespertine Live
No.	Title	Writer(s)	Length
1.	"Frosti"	Björk	1:23
2.	"Overture"	Björk	3:36
3.	"All Is Full of Love"	Björk	4:04
4.	"Cocoon"	Björk; Thomas Knak	4:31
5.	"Aurora"	Björk	3:44
6.	"Undo"	Björk; Knak	5:48
7.	"Unravel"	Björk; Guy Sigsworth	3:38
8.	"I've Seen It All"	Björk; Sjón; Lars von Trier	5:17
9.	"An Echo, A Stain"	Björk; Sigsworth	4:35
10.	"Generous Palmstroke"	Björk; Zeena Parkins	4:08
11.	"Hidden Place"	Björk	5:37
12.	"Pagan Poetry"	Björk	5:30
13.	"Harm of Will"	Björk; Sigsworth; Harmony Korine	4:31
14.	"It's Not Up To You"	Björk	5:24
15.	"Unison"	Björk	6:22
16.	"It's In Our Hands"	Björk	6:27
Total length:			74:35

Disc 5 — Bonus DVD
No.	Title	Writer(s)	Length
1.	"One Day" (from MTV Unplugged)	Björk
2.	"It's Oh So Quiet" (from Taratata)	Reisfeld; Lang
3.	"Jóga" (from Later with Jools Holland)	Björk; Sjón
4.	"Aurora" (from Vespertine Live at the Royal Opera House)	Björk
5.	"It's Not Up to You" (from Vespertine Live at the Royal Opera House)	Björk

== Charts ==
Chart (2003)	Peak position
France	99
U.S. Top Electronic Albums (Billboard)	12
