= Greatest Hits tour (Björk) =

2003 concert tour by Björk

- Tour by Björk
- Promotional poster for 22 August 2003 concert
- Associated album: Greatest Hits
- Start date: 24 May 2003
- End date: 3 September 2003
- Legs: 3
- No. of shows: 18 in Europe; 1 in Asia; 9 in North America; 28 total

Björk concert chronology
- Vespertine world tour (2001); Greatest Hits tour (2003); The Volta tour (2007–08)

The Greatest Hits tour was the fifth worldwide concert tour by Icelandic musician Björk. It was launched in support of the release of her Greatest Hits album, her box set Family Tree, and to coincide with the release of her Live Box collection. The tour was supposed to take place one year earlier, but it was delayed as Björk gave birth to her daughter. The first dates of the tour were announced just two months after the birth. The tour kicked off with two shows in London on 24 May 2003, and ended with a rescheduled performance in Toronto on 3 September 2003. The tour visited Europe, Asia and North America with 28 shows in total. Björk wore outfits and creations from Jeremy Scott, Alexander McQueen and Shoplifter.

The songs performed were mainly from Vespertine and Homogenic. The tour band was made up of members of previous tour bands: the Iceland string octet (which were featured also in the Homogenic tour), electronic duo Matmos and harpist Zeena Parkins (who had previously been part of the touring band for Vespertine world tour). Iranian musician Leila Arab (who had previously been part of the touring band for Post) joined the band for the European and Asian shows. There was a notable lack of focus on material from Debut and Post. The tour was appreciated by critics, who lauded Björk's performances, presence on scene and fashion choices. This is the only one of Björk's tours not to have had a corresponding DVD or CD release, although many performances were broadcast and a live track of "All is Full of Love" from this tour can be found on the soundtrack to the Icelandic film Screaming Masterpiece, whilst the film itself contains partial live performances of both "All is Full of Love" and "Pluto".

== Background ==
In 2001, Björk embarked on her fourth tour, the Vespertine world tour, which featured the singer playing in opera houses and theatres backed by the 54-piece orchestra Il Novecento. During a press conference in Barcelona, Spain, before her concert at Liceu, Björk confirmed that there would have been another tour the following year, which would have featured more conventional locations and band. On 26 January 2002, it was announced that Björk would headline the Coachella Valley Music and Arts Festival which was to take place in April 2002. By the time of the show, the singer was pregnant with her second child, the first with partner Matthew Barney, and the show was the only planned appearance for the year. During the course of 2002, Björk released her first greatest hits album, aptly called Greatest Hits, and first box set, Family Tree, which followed a string of DVD releases which spanned her first ten years of solo career. Björk stated that the process "was like spring cleaning, complete with nostalgic, boring, and mushy moments, but ultimately, it was liberating to have an absolutely clean attic. Now, I have a brand-new chalkboard on which to work". The singer gave birth to her daughter, Ísadóra Bjarkardóttir Barney, on 3 October 2002. At the end of the year, the first dates for Björk's newest tour were announced in Verona, Paris and Hamburg. More dates were later added in March 2003, including two headlining shows in Russia, where the singer had never played before. Björk was confirmed to headline the Fuji Rock Festival in Yuzawa, Niigata, Japan and further shows were announced to take place in North America, including two shows at Brooklyn KeySpan Park. In April 2003, it was confirmed that Zeena Parkins and Matmos, who have played with her during her last tour, would rejoin her, along with the Icelandic String Octet, that was part of the band during the Homogenic tour. Leila Arab was later confirmed to be a part of the band too, but she appeared only during the European and Asian shows due to visa issues. On 16 May 2003, Björk streamed via webcast the final rehearsal for the upcoming tour live at the Loftkastalinn Theatre in Reykjavík.

The shows featured pyrotechnics, moving sculptures on stage and video projections. The London-based direction and animation collective Lynn Fox provided the backdrops for some songs on the tour, including "Pluto", "Desired Constellation", "Unravel" and "It's in Our Hands". During the tour Björk wore dresses by Jeremy Scott and Shoplifter along with ornaments by young Icelandic designer and, most notably, a pair of ear ornaments by Alexander McQueen.

== Critical reception ==
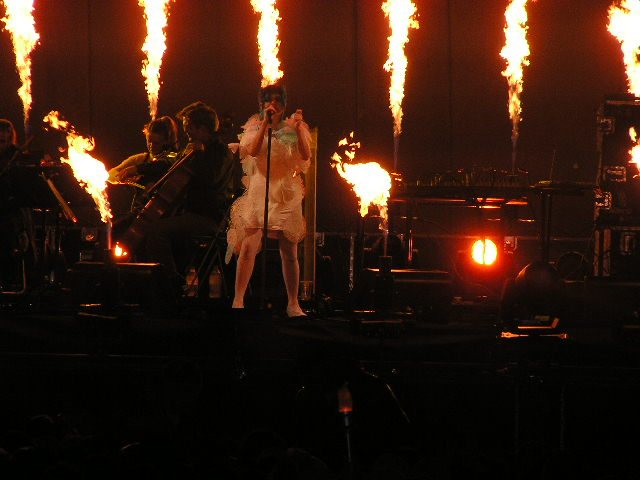
Björk performing at the Fuji Rock Festival on July 26, 2003

The tour received positive reviews from critics. John Mulvay of Yahoo! Music noted that the show "initially seems [...] a virtual reprise of her Vespertine performances. In fact, Vespertine idea - a sort of solemn classical fragility underpinned by volatile, glitchy rhythms - is extended to permeate rarely-visited corners of Björk's back catalogue" and praised the show by saying "it's closer to high art than pop, incorporating performance art, chamber music and radical sound design". David Peschek of The Guardian, reviewing the first show in London, commented that "there is more rhythmic invention in this show than in the rest of current electronic music. Björk has become a curator of exotic, alien sounds, the latest in a rare lineage that includes Martin Denny, Esquivel, Lalo Schifrin and Yello", ultimately labeling the show as "thrilling". Ian Watson of NME wrote that "With the help of harpist Zeena Parkins and San Franciscan sound sculptors Matmos, who've fashioned lithe, subtle beats from the sounds of cracking ice and shuffled cards, her Bjorkness is moving ever closer to her ultimate dream. A breathtaking fusion of tradition and progress, of electronica and steam, of classical beauty in a groundbreaking frame".

Neva Chonin of the San Francisco Chronicle billed the show as "one of the most delightfully mind-blowing pop spectacles of the year" and further commented "the pop world’s eccentric dancing queen topped herself by putting on a show as strange, beautiful and playfully joyous as herself." Steven Mirkin of Variety, reviewing her performance at Hollywood Bowl, opined that "her performance did not quite live up the high bar she set", confronting the show to her last concert in Los Angeles at the Dorothy Chandler Pavilion, but later added "it was an impressive evening nonetheless". A more lukewarm review came for her two shows at KeySpan Park, with Andy Gensler of Rolling Stone commenting "the sheer spectacle overwhelmed fans at the Brooklyn ballpark - even if the meaning was often lost in the explosions" and further adding that the show was "impressive, but it also prompted a question: Why?".

The show's fashion was critically lauded. David Peschek stated "Björk walks on stage wearing the kind of dress [...] that the people who compile fashion pages like to laugh at, not realising she dresses that way because she finds fashion funny." Gene Stout of the Seattle Post Globe stated that the outfits were "fun, fanciful and typically Björk" and noted how the singer's eclectic fashion choices influenced her fans by saying that they "also expressed their individual Björk-ness with odd costumes and gender-blending accessories. What was most striking about Björk’s fans was their attentiveness. Many appeared mesmerized by the diminutive, fairy-like singer and her soaring, eccentric blend of pop, electronica, classical and old-European musical elements." Ta-Nehisi Coates of The Village Voice stated that "she looked exquisitely ridiculous".

== Set list ==
This set list is from the 24 May 2003 concert in London, England. It is not intended to represent all concerts for the tour.

1. "Pagan Poetry"
2. "5 Years"
3. "Hunter"
4. "Desired Constellation" (Note: Unreleased at the time. Later released on Medúlla (2004))
5. "Unravel"
6. "Jóga"
7. "All Is Full of Love"
8. "Heirloom"
9. "Generous Palmstroke"
10. "Nature Is Ancient"
11. "Hyperballad"
12. "It's in Our Hands" (Soft Pink Truth Mix)
13. "Nameless" (Note: Unreleased at the time. Later retitled "Storm" and released on Drawing Restraint 9 (2005))
14. "An Echo, a Stain"
15. "Where Is the Line"
16. "Pluto"

Encore

17. "Scary"
18. "You've Been Flirting Again"
19. "Isobel"

=== Other songs performed ===
- "Bachelorette"
- "Human Behaviour"
- "Cocoon"
- "Síðasta Ég"
- "Army of Me"
- "Show Me Forgiveness"
- "Vísur Vatnsenda-Rósu" (instrumental)
- "Gotham Lullaby" (Meredith Monk cover)
- "I've Seen It All"
- "Aurora"
- "Mouth's Cradle"
- "Scatterheart"
- "Mother Heroic"

== Tour dates ==
List of concerts
Date (2003)	City	Country	Venue	Opening act(s)
24 May	London	England	Hammersmith Apollo	Aphex Twin
26 May	London	England	Shepherd's Bush Empire	Soft Pink Truth
30 May^{[A]}	Valencia	Spain	City of Arts and Sciences	Soft Pink Truth
1 June^{[B]}	Madrid	Spain	Juan Carlos I Park	Soft Pink Truth
6 June	Verona	Italy	Verona Arena	Soft Pink Truth
7 June	Verona	Italy	Verona Arena	Soft Pink Truth
13 June^{[C]}	Barcelona	Spain	Sonar Club	—N/a
16 June	Paris	France	Palais Omnisports de Paris-Bercy	Peaches
17 June	Paris	France	Palais Omnisports de Paris-Bercy	Peaches
21 June^{[D]}	Scheeßel	Germany	Eichenring	Peaches
23 June	Berlin	Germany	Treptow Arena	Peaches
26 June^{[E]}	Werchter	Belgium	Werchterpark	—N/a
29 June^{[F]}	Roskilde	Denmark	Festivalpladsen	—N/a
5 July^{[G]}	Sesimbra	Portugal	Meco	—N/a
10 July^{[H]}	Arvika	Sweden	Folkets Park	—N/a
12 July^{[I]}	Sopot	Poland	Sopot Molo	Peaches
17 July	Moscow	Russia	Olympic Stadium	Peaches
19 July	Saint Petersburg	Russia	Ice Palace	Peaches
26 July^{[J]}	Yuzawa	Japan	Naeba Ski Resort	—N/a
8 August	San Francisco	United States	Pier 30/32	Bonnie Prince Billy; Matthew Herbert Big Band
11 August	Los Angeles	United States	Hollywood Bowl	Bonnie Prince Billy; Matthew Herbert Big Band
15 August	Seattle	United States	Pier 62/63	Bonnie Prince Billy
18 August	Morrison	United States	Red Rocks Amphitheatre	Bonnie Prince Billy
22 August	New York City	United States	KeySpan Park	Bonnie Prince Billy; Sigur Rós
23 August	New York City	United States	KeySpan Park	Bonnie Prince Billy; Sigur Rós
28 August	Montreal	Canada	Parc Jean-Drapeau	Bonnie Prince Billy; Yeah Yeah Yeahs
31 August	Boston	United States	Fleet Pavilion	Yeah Yeah Yeahs
3 September	Toronto	Canada	Olympic Island	Bonnie Prince Billy

=== Festivals and other performances ===
^{A} This concert was a part of Eclectic Festival
^{B} This concert was a part of Schweppes Urban Mix Festival
^{C} This concert was a part of Sónar
^{D} This concert was a part of Hurricane Festival
^{E} This concert was a part of Rock Werchter

^{F} This concert was a part of Roskilde Festival
^{G} This concert was a part of Optimus Hype Festival
^{H} This concert was a part of Arvika Festival
^{I} This concert was a part of W Festival
^{J} This concert was a part of Fuji Rock Festival

=== Rescheduled shows ===
26 August 2003	Toronto, Canada	Olympic Island	Rescheduled to 3 September 2003, due to scheduling and logistic issues
31 August 2003	Boston, United States	Suffolk Downs	Moved to Fleet Pavilion because of a failure to get a license for pyrotechnics

== Personnel ==
Credits adapted from the Live Book.

- Björk
- Matmos – electronics
- Leila Arab – electronics (absent during the North American leg)
- Zeena Parkins – harp
- Icelandic String Octet – strings
  - Sigrún Eðvaldsdóttir
  - Una Sveinbjarnardóttir
  - Ari Þór Vilhjálmsson
  - Íma Þöll Jónsdóttir
  - Jónína Auður Hilmarsdóttir
  - Móeiður Anna Sigurðardóttir
  - Sigurður Bjarki Gunnarsson
  - Jón Ragnar Örnólfsson
- LynnFox – visuals
  - Christian McKenzie
  - Patrick Chen
  - Bastian Glassner
