= Pluto (song) =

Song by Björk

from the album Homogenic
- Released: 20 September 1997
- Recorded: 1997
- Studio: El Cortijo (Marbella, Spain)
- Genre: Industrial techno; experimental; IDM
- Length: 3:20
- Label: One Little Indian
- Songwriters: Björk; Mark Bell
- Producers: Björk; Mark Bell

"Pluto" is a song by Icelandic musician Björk. The song was written and produced by Björk and British producer Mark Bell for Björk's third studio album, Homogenic (1997).

== Background and development ==
The song is a collaborative effort between Björk and LFO's Mark Bell, who was credited for the majority of the album's co-production. Björk desired to have Mark Bell contribute to her albums Debut and Post, only finding him available for Homogenic. Björk wrote the song on a Nord Lead synthesizer. The final version was a result of Björk and Bell's improvised jam sessions in Málaga, Spain, where the album was recorded. Björk recalls:

"That was me and Mark having a laugh in Spain. It was a [hot] day like this. We got a little amp outside and a keyboard and I just did all these really punk things, just really thinking heavy metal. Most of the tracks I wrote before Mark started on them, so they're more like song-songs, and then Mark would work on beats and arrangements with me afterwards."

The song's title comes from the astrological concepts of Pluto, the sign ruler of Scorpio. Pluto is sometimes called "the Great Renewer": it is the planet of rebirth and transformation that comes from experiences of destruction. A Scorpio herself, Björk has said: "having a lot in the planet Pluto, which I do, means you want to cut the crap, throw all the rubbish away. No extra baggage. It's death and birth."

== Composition ==
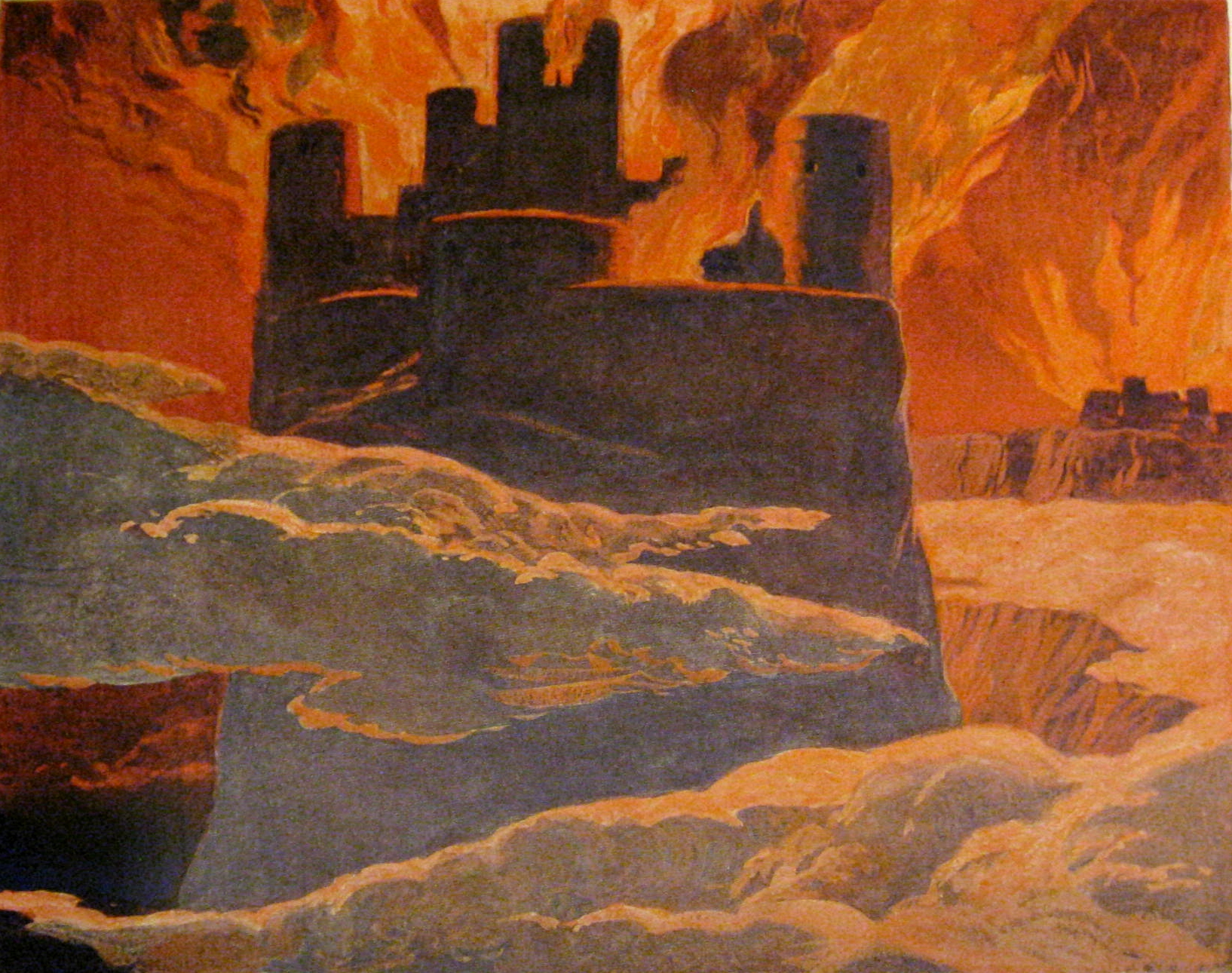
Emil Doepler's depiction of Ragnarök. Keeping the idea of the album as a tribute to Iceland, Björk was inspired by this apocalyptic event in Norse canon, which results in a new and fertile world.

"Pluto"
Homogenic's most aggressive track, "Pluto" features hard techno beats, Björk's "primitive-sounding screams" and destructive lyrics.

Written and produced by Björk and Mark Bell, the four-on-the-floor "Pluto" has been described as the "most techno-sounding composition from the album" and "Homogenic's most savage song". The track has also been described as "industrial-edged" by Billboard, and James Hunter of Spin wrote "only with [...] the industrial 'Pluto' does she concentrate on genre." Dominique Leone of Pitchfork dubbed the song "experimental house". The track has also been identified as IDM. Björk sings in "primitive-sounding screams", accentuated by a sampled, digitized beat that creates the perception that her voice is "natural" and "is being manipulated by something completely technological". Although her voice and the beats give the song its hard techno sound, their methodical rhythm "also evoke chantlike characteristics". David Browne of Entertainment Weekly wrote she sings along drum and bass rhythms "trying to do with techno what vocalese singers did with bebop nearly 50 years ago". Musicologist Sheila Whiteley wrote that "the jagged electronic samples and frenetic 140bpm of 'Pluto' creates an uneasy feel." Christopher John of Time described the song as "techno-infused".

"Pluto"'s aesthetic is part of the "aggressive, macho" feeling Björk was trying to convey in Homogenic. The track also goes in hand with the album's tribute to her native Iceland; "Pluto" is inspired by Icelandic mythology. In an interview with David Hemingway, Björk said: "you have this saga where the Gods get aggressive and the world explodes and everything dies and then the sun comes up and everything starts all over again;" referring to Ragnarök. The following and final track, "All Is Full of Love", stands for that new beginning, "like the birds coming out after a thunderstorm", whereas "Pluto" stands for death. The singer has also described "Pluto" as about "being plastered, that need to destroy everything so you can start again". Lyrically, it has been described as "sparse". Björk sings: "Excuse me/But I just have to/Explode/Explode this body/Off me/I'll be brand new/Brand new tomorrow/A little bit tired/But brand new." Some critics considered the lyrics to be about the contemplation of suicide. Discussing the track, Sheila Whiteley wrote: "as anyone who has been through personal trauma knows only too well, rejuvenation often involves a nightmare journey." Björk's official website also stated that the song is "about the liberation of hedonism".

== Reception ==
"Pluto" has been met with acclaim from music critics. Although he gave the album a mixed review, Stephen Thompson of The A.V. Club considered the song to be a highlight of the album, writing it "is a heart-poundingly wicked, electronics-driven stunner." Slant Magazine's Sal Cinquemani felt that "never has the impetus to suicide been captured more thoughtfully or beautifully, at least in song." Peter Buckley thought the song was a stand-out track and that it "[emphasizes] her skills as composer, singer and producer." In the Homogenic review for Pitchfork's Top 100 Albums of the 1990s, Dominique Leone of wrote that only in "Pluto", Björk "[steps] out from her cocoon in a fit of rage, although even then an air of intrigue envelops the track."

== Promotion ==
=== Live performances ===
Björk presented the song—and three more songs off the then-unreleased Homogenic—at the Tibetan Freedom Concert on 6 June 1997, as a sneak peek of the album. She performed with Mark Bell, who was raised at the rear of the stage surrounded by keyboards and sequencers, and with the Icelandic String Octet conducted by Eumir Deodato at one side of the stage. She wore a pink dress designed by Hussein Chalayan, which she would later wear in the video for "Bachelorette" and photoshoots. That July, Björk performed the whole album for a press conference and presentation concert regarding Homogenic at the Old Truman Building, an old beer factory in London, wearing the same outfit. During the brief Homogenic promotional tour, which took place from 31 August to 10 September 1997, "Pluto" was the closing track of the set.

The song was part of the set list of the Homogenic tour which Björk embarked with Mark Bell and the Icelandic String Octet from late 1997 to early 1999. A performance of "Pluto" at the Cambridge Corn Exchange during the tour was included in the video release Live in Cambridge (2001). Björk's June 1998 performance of the song in Prague was released in Homogenic Live, a live album of the tour included in the box set Live Box (2003).

"Pluto" was also performed during the Greatest Hits tour of 2003, which once again featured the Icelandic String Octet, but with the addition of Vespertine world tour collaborators Matmos and Zeena Parkins. The song was performed during the Volta tour (2007–08), a tour she undertook with Mark Bell, Jónas Sen, Damian Taylor, Chris Corsano and a 10 piece female brass band. Several of the concerts were part of festivals, including Coachella, Glastonbury and Rock en Seine, among others. A live performance of "Pluto" during the tour was included in the box set Voltaïc (2009), specifically the DVD The Volta Tour ("Live in Paris"). During the Biophilia tour (2011–13), Björk performed the song using a singing Tesla coil

Björk performed the song acoustically, only backed by strings, as the closing song during her acoustic Vulnicura tour shows in 2016 and 2017, and during her Björk Orkestral performances (2021–2023). The singer defined this version of the song as "strings techno".

=== Music video ===
During the development of her Greatest Hits tour, Björk enlisted London-based collective LynnFox, which comprises Christian McKenzie, Patrick Chen, and Bastian Glassner, to create different music videos to be used as backdrops during the performances. The visual for "Pluto", shot on a black backdrop, features a convulsing man, Icelandic actor Ingvar Sigurðsson, furiously simulating masturbation until his head explodes. For the role, the actor agreed to perform naked and shave his hair.

== See also ==
- List of songs recorded by Björk
