= Live in Cambridge =

Video by Björk
- Released: 26 November 2001
- Recorded: 2 December 1998
- Venue: Cambridge Corn Exchange (Cambridge, England)
- Genre: Alternative
- Length: 1:06:00
- Label: One Little Indian
- Director: David Barnard

Björk chronology
| Volumen (1998) | Live in Cambridge (2001) | MTV Unplugged / Live (2002) |

Live in Cambridge is an official DVD released by the Icelandic musician Björk on 26 November 2001. It contains a live performance by Björk on the Homogenic tour, recorded live at the Cambridge Corn Exchange in Cambridge, England, on 2 December 1998. It was one of the last of the concerts performed on that tour.

The DVD is notable for having one track, "Violently Happy", which was omitted from the final release. The performances of "Vísur Vatnsenda Rósu" and "Anchor Song" also appear on Homogenic Live.

== Track list ==
| No. | Title | Length |
|---|---|---|
| 1. | "Vísur Vatnsenda-Rósu" | 4:01 |
| 2. | "Hunter" | 4:32 |
| 3. | "Come to Me" | 4:19 |
| 4. | "All Neon Like" | 5:12 |
| 5. | "You've Been Flirting Again" | 3:24 |
| 6. | "Isobel" | 5:20 |
| 7. | "Immature" | 2:57 |
| 8. | "Play Dead" | 4:02 |
| 9. | "Alarm Call" | 3:17 |
| 10. | "Human Behaviour" | 3:55 |
| 11. | "Bachelorette" | 5:21 |
| 12. | "Hyperballad" | 4:44 |
| 13. | "Pluto" | 4:21 |
| 14. | "The Anchor Song" | 4:20 |
| 15. | "Jóga" | 5:26 |
