= Post Live =

Live album by Björk
- Released: 1 June 2004
- Recorded: 17 June 1995; 18 February 1996; 19 April 1996; 27 February 1997
- Venue: Shepherd's Bush Empire
- Genre: Electronica
- Length: 53:59
- Label: One Little Indian
- Producer: Various

Björk chronology
Debut Live (2004)	Post Live (2004)	Homogenic Live (2004)

Post Live is a live album by Icelandic singer Björk. It contains live performances centering mostly on Björk's second album, Post, though several songs from her Debut album appear in drastically reworked versions. Originally released in the 5 disc Live Box set in 2003, Post Live was later released separately on 1 June 2004 by One Little Indian records.

== Background ==
The Post tour saw Björk travel the world from 1995 to 1996 promoting her second album, Post. However, the majority of these concerts were not recorded or preserved as Björk did not start having soundboard recordings until the Homogenic tour in 1997. In 2002 when she was preparing collections of her live performances for Live Box she had to rely on the audio of videotaped performances of the Post tour.

The recording she chose was of a special free concert given on 27 February 1997 exclusively for members of the Björk fan club. This show took place 4 months after the conclusion of the Post tour and was recorded at Shepherd's Bush Empire in London.

The first release of material from the Shepherd's Bush gig was on VHS on 16 November 1998. Two songs were omitted from the tape, "It's Oh So Quiet" and "Sweet Intuition", the latter a Post-era B-side which had its only ever live performance at this concert. Three years later on 19 November 2001 the concert film was re-released on DVD.

When Post Live was initially announced, it contained 18 tracks including every single song featured on the Shepherd's Bush DVD (albeit with a few of the performances swapped out for promotional TV appearances) and a performance of "It's Oh So Quiet" from the French TV program Taratata. When the CD was finally released however, Post Live contained only 13 tracks, omitting "Venus as a Boy", "You've Been Flirting Again", "Human Behaviour", "Crying" and "Violently Happy". Live Box was released on 18 August 2003. The video of Post Live's "It's Oh So Quiet" is featured on the bonus DVD found in the box set. The stand-alone CD edition of Post Live was released the following year, on 1 June 2004.

== Reception ==
AllMusic stated, "Björk's remarkable voice is constantly at the fore", and called it "a solid collection that displays the charming diva in fine form". Writing for Pitchfork, Scott Plagenhoef called the Shepherd's Bush performances "vital" while criticising the promotional TV appearance substitutes of "Possibly Maybe" and "Hyperballad". Adrien Begrand of PopMatters criticised Björk for releasing various CD and DVD collections following 2001's Vespertine and also bemoaned the substitution of the promotional TV performances over the complete Shepherd's Bush show but praised her performances on Post Live: "Björk and her five-piece band are on fire on this recording, deftly combining organic instrumentation with electronic improvisation."

== Track listing ==
All songs were recorded at Shepherd's Bush Empire on 27 February 1997 except where noted.

Post Live track listing
No.	Title	Writer(s)	Length
1.	"Headphones"	Björk; Tricky	2:58
2.	"Army of Me"	Björk; Graham Massey	4:04
3.	"One Day (Trevor Morais Mix)"	Björk	3:37
4.	"The Modern Things"	Björk; Massey	3:52
5.	"Isobel"	Björk; Marius de Vries; Nellee Hooper; Sjón	5:27
6.	"Possibly Maybe" (Later with Jools Holland, 17 June 1995)	Björk	5:22
7.	"Hyperballad" (Later with Jools Holland, 17 June 1995)	Björk	5:05
8.	"I Go Humble"	Björk; Mark Bell	4:03
9.	"Big Time Sensuality"	Björk; Hooper	4:53
10.	"Enjoy"	Björk; Tricky	3:39
11.	"I Miss You" (TFI Friday, 19 April 1996)	Björk; Howie B	3:56
12.	"It's Oh So Quiet" (Taratata, 18 February 1996)	Bert Reisfeld; Hans Lang	3:52
13.	"The Anchor Song"	Björk	3:11
Total length:			53:59
