= Vulnicura tour =

2015–17 concert tour by Björk

- Tour by Björk
- Promotional poster for the Berlin concert at Zitadelle
- Associated album: Vulnicura
- Start date: 7 March 2015
- End date: 3 November 2017
- No. of shows: 12 in North America; 14 in Europe; 1 in Asia; 27 total

Björk concert chronology
- Biophilia tour (2011–13); Vulnicura tour (2015–17); Utopia tour (2018)

The Vulnicura tour was the eighth concert tour by Icelandic musician Björk. The tour centered on her critically acclaimed 2015 album Vulnicura which chronicled the singer's breakup with American contemporary artist Matthew Barney.

The first half of each show featured the first six songs from the album, performed uninterrupted. Following an intermission, Björk returned to the stage to perform a collection of songs from her past, newly rearranged to take advantage of the 15 strings players of The Heritage Orchestra, percussionist and hang drum player Manu Delago, and Arca on electronics. On festival dates The Haxan Cloak performed on electronics, debuting his remix of "Mouth Mantra" at the Governor's Ball in New York.

The Vulnicura tour is the second Björk concert not to receive a corresponding DVD release, following the Greatest Hits tour in 2003. None of the 27 concerts are known to have been professionally filmed but a concert in Iceland on 8 November 2016 was, though no plans have been announced for a home video release or TV broadcast.

== Background and concert synopsis ==
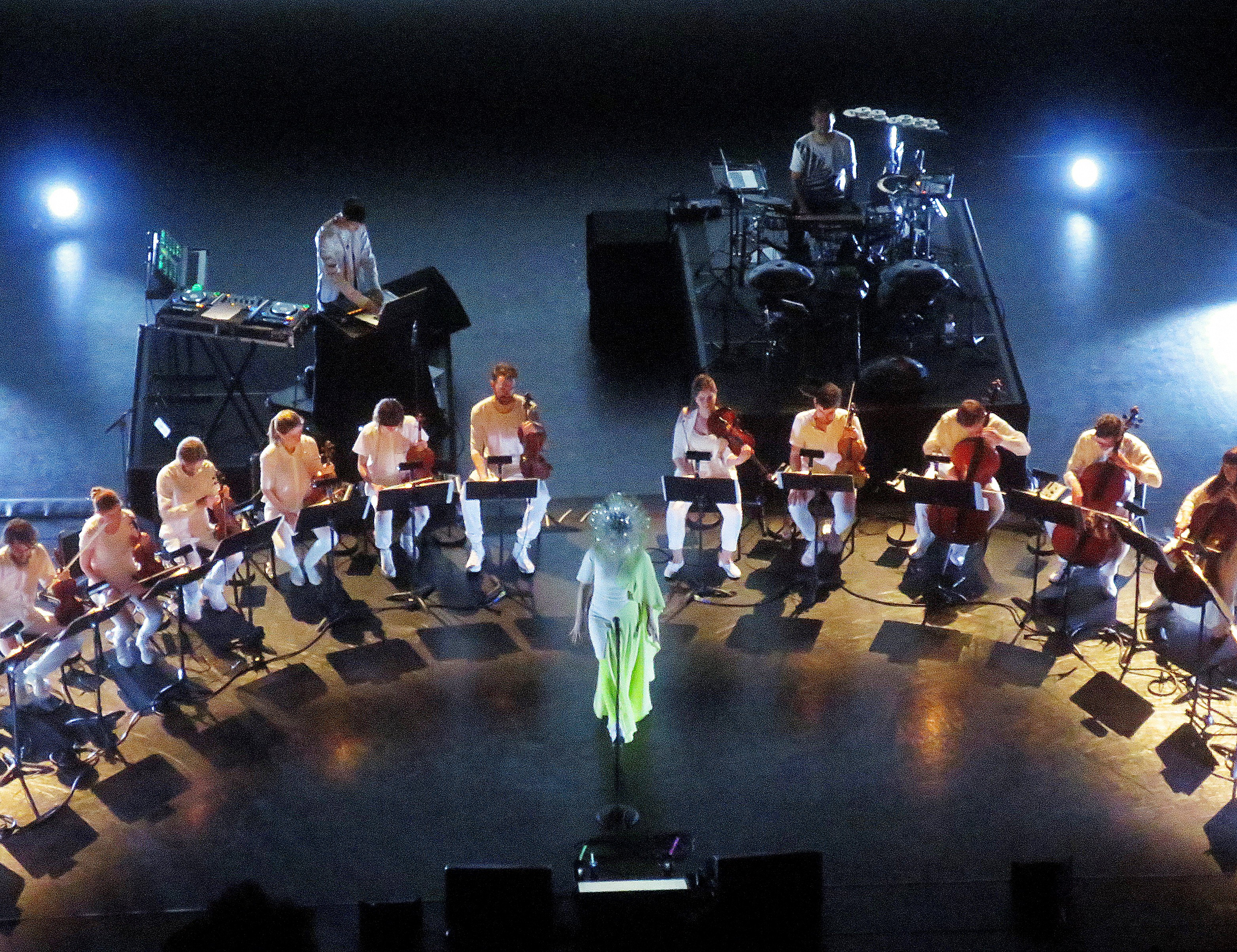
Björk performing at the New York City Center, accompanied by Alarm Will Sound, Arca and Manu Delago

On 7 January 2015, Björk was announced as one of the performers of the 2015 Governors Ball. It was her first confirmed appearance since the conclusion of the Biophilia tour and her first concert in New York City since 2012.

On 16 January 2015, the singer confirmed the upcoming Vulnicura tour by announcing six dates through March and April in New York, where she performed at the Stern Auditorium at Carnegie Hall and the New York City Center. On Twitter, Björk confirmed that Arca would play with her on selected dates. She later added two shows at Brooklyn's Kings Theatre sandwiched in between the Carnegie Hall and City Center shows. Alarm Will Sound, a New York-based chamber orchestra, joined Björk and Arca on stage, as did Austrian hang drum player and percussionist Manu Delago, who previously toured with Björk on Biophilia. The Haxan Cloak took over electronic duties from Arca on festival dates in New York and later in Europe, playing a total of six Vulnicura tour shows.

On 8 August 2015, Björk announced the temporary stop of the tour, stating, "These have truly been some of my most sublime moments!! Singing this album has been intense and the internal clock of it different to the other ones. It has sort of had to behave in its own little way. Both the urgency of the leak and now this sudden closure for reasons beyond my control is characteristic of that. I hope through the years I have earned enough tourkarma points to get your support for this." She added, "I have started writing new songs and feel the best most natural pathway to go is to let this beast flow its natural course and start anew."

=== Follow up acoustic concerts ===
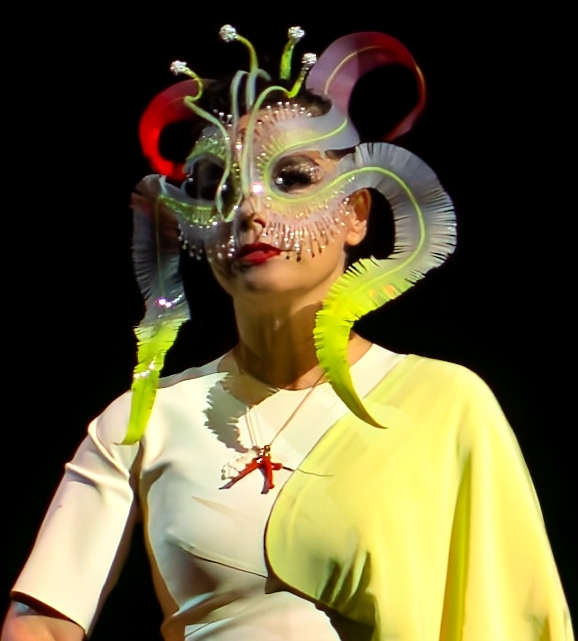
Björk performing at the Royal Albert Hall in London.

On 21 September 2016, Björk gave her first acoustic Vulnicura concert at the Royal Albert Hall in London, and then later at Harpa in Iceland. These strings only shows follow the general format of the original Vulnicura tour with the first six songs from the album performed uninterrupted with the second half of the show featuring mostly songs from her back catalogue. Of her back catalogue songs, only "Bachelorette" was played during both the original tour and these strings-only shows; all other songs made their Vulnicura era debuts. She continued the acoustic concert experience in Mexico City on 29 March 2017. Björk made her debut at the Walt Disney Concert Hall in Downtown Los Angeles on 30 May 2017 to coincide with the west coast premiere of Bjork Digital. She performed with the LA Philharmonic and during the show announced that it would be her last concert in support of her 2015 album, Vulnicura.

Björk headlined the Ceremonia Festival in Toluca, Mexico on 2 April 2017 where she and Arca played a strings and electronics set and debuted Arca's remix of Björk's 1995 song, "Isobel". She performed a similar strings and beats show in downtown Los Angeles at FYF Fest on 21 July 2017 and at Fuji Rock in Japan.

On 20 October 2017, 2 concerts were announced in the country of Georgia, at the Tbilisi Concert Hall on 31 October and at Tbilisi Opera and Ballet Theater on 3 November. Backed by the National Symphonic Orchestra of Georgia, both nights saw Björk perform songs from her 2015 album Vulnicura despite announcing the end of the tour in Los Angeles back on 30 May 2017. Although the first single from her new album Utopia, "The Gate", had already been released at the time (on 15 September 2017), the song was not performed.

== Reception ==
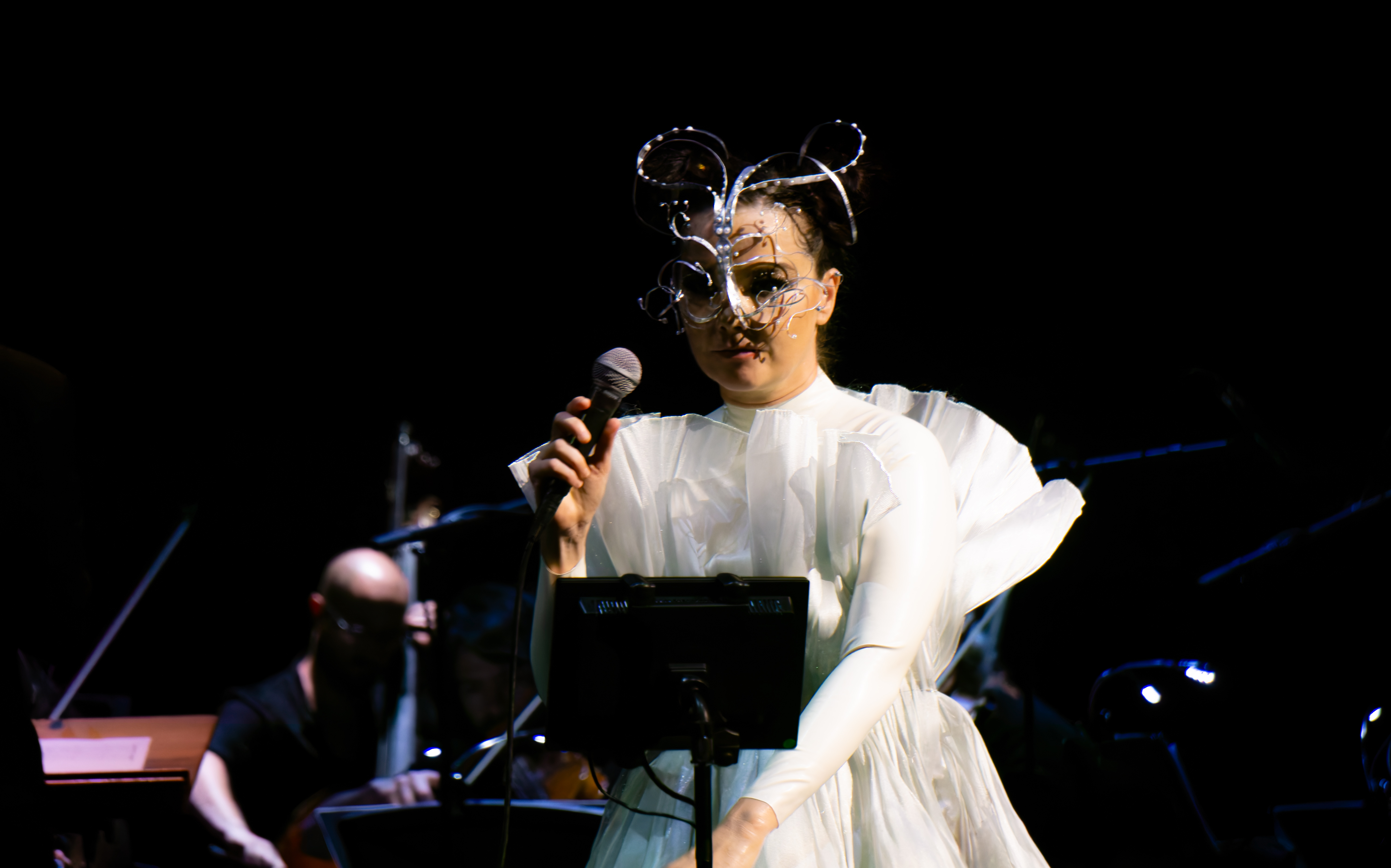
Björk performing during the tour in 2016.

The Vulnicura tour was universally acclaimed by critics. It opened on 7 March 2015 at Carnegie Hall; Björk walked on stage to thunderous applause wearing a dress with motorized fabric chest wound by Iris Van Herpen and sporting a headpiece designed by Maiko Takeda. Billboard.com wrote of the show, "Björk has not been shy about the personal woes that inspired Vulnicura, and to see her declare "I am not hurt" to a sold-out audience made for a truly inspiring moment." Patrick Ryan of USA Today said, "Although her face wasn't visible for the first hour, she couldn't have been more expressive as she worked her way through Vulnicura, starting with the sweeping, reflective "Stonemilker"; and proceeding into the exotic, slithering strings of "Lionsong"... Starting with "Pleasure is All Mine" off 2004's Medúlla, the subsequent "Come to Me", "Undo" and "I See Who You Are" were all met with bursts of knowing cheers from the crowd. Bjork returned without a mask and wearing a custom lilac latex dress by Geoffrey Mac for the second act. If the first half felt like a soundtrack for the chilly, winter's day outside Carnegie Hall, these more vibrant numbers were like spring creeping around the corner." He added, "For this reviewer (who was only minimally familiar with Björk's catalog and Vulnicura before the concert), it didn't feel like anything was lost being a relative newcomer to her work. She's just that dynamic of a live performer."

The tour received equally glowing reviews when it moved to Europe months later. Writing about Björk's European debut at the Manchester International Festival, The Telegraph wrote, "Björk doesn't do (a) break-up (album) like anyone else" and that the singer "proved that she's capable of transmuting despair into a very singular form of rapture." Similarly, The Guardian wrote, "Vulnicura contains the sort of personal thoughts and details that few stars would confide to their psychiatrist, never mind perform to more than 5,000 people in an open-air urban amphitheatre. Her lyrics hit home like nails in the coffin of something that was precious. "Maybe he will come out of this loving me," she muses, as doubt bleeds into fury. "I honoured my feelings. You betrayed your own heart," she snaps in the bleakly devastating "Black Lake", as percussionist Manu Delago drops what sound like sonic bombs."

== Opening acts ==
- Arca
- Lotic

== Set list ==
The following is a list of songs performed by Björk during the Vulnicura tour. A typical set list from the show consisted of the first 6 songs from the Vulnicura album during the concert's first half, and a second half consisting of songs from her back catalogue. As she often does, the festival dates featured more songs from her discography.

=== 2015 shows ===
This set list is from the 25 March 2015 concert in New York City, United States. It is not intended to represent all concerts for the year.

1. "Stonemilker"
2. "Lionsong"
3. "History of Touches"
4. "Black Lake"
5. "Family"
6. "Notget"

Intermission

7. "Pleasure Is All Mine"
8. "Come to Me"
9. "All Neon Like"
10. "I See Who You Are"
11. "Quicksand"
12. "Mouth Mantra"

Encore

13. "Sun in My Mouth"
14. "Wanderlust"

=== Festival shows ===
This set list is from the 31 July 2017 concert in Yuzawa, Japan. It is not intended to represent all concerts for the year.

1. "Stonemilker"
2. "Lionsong"
3. "Come to Me"
4. "Jóga"
5. "Unravel"
6. "Mouth's Cradle"
7. "You've Been Flirting Again"
8. "Isobel"
9. "Bachelorette"
10. "5 Years"
11. "Wanderlust"
12. "Notget"
13. "Mouth Mantra"
14. "Quicksand"
15. "Mutual Core"

Encore

16. "History of Touches"
17. "Hyperballad"

=== Acoustic shows ===
This set list is from the 3 November 2017 concert in Tbilisi, Georgia. It is not intended to represent all concerts for the year.

1. "Stonemilker"
2. "Lionsong"
3. "History of Touches"
4. "Black Lake"
5. "Notget"
6. "Mouth Mantra"

Intermission

7. "Aurora"
8. "I've Seen It All"
9. "Jóga"
10. "Vertebræ By Vertebræ"
11. "Quicksand"
12. "Pagan Poetry"
13. "Bachelorette"

Encore

14. "The Anchor Song"
15. "Pluto"

=== Other songs performed ===
On select dates in 2015, Björk added the following songs to the set list.

- "Undo"
- "Harm of Will"
- "All Is Full of Love"
- "Atom Dance"
- "Hunter"
- "Army of Me"
- "Possibly Maybe"
- "Where Is the Line"
- "One Day"

== Tour dates ==
List of 2015 concerts
Date (2015)	City	Country	Venue	Players	Electronics
7 March	New York City	United States	Carnegie Hall	Alarm Will Sound; Manu Delago	Arca
14 March	New York City	United States	Carnegie Hall	Alarm Will Sound; Manu Delago	Arca
18 March	New York City	United States	Kings Theatre	Alarm Will Sound; Manu Delago	Arca
22 March	New York City	United States	Kings Theatre	Alarm Will Sound; Manu Delago	Arca
25 March	New York City	United States	New York City Center	Alarm Will Sound; Manu Delago	Arca
28 March	New York City	United States	New York City Center	Alarm Will Sound; Manu Delago	Arca
1 April	New York City	United States	New York City Center	Alarm Will Sound; Manu Delago	Arca
6 June^{[A]}	New York City	United States	Randalls Island Park	Alarm Will Sound; Manu Delago	The Haxan Cloak
5 July^{[B]}	Manchester	England	Castlefield Arena	Heritage Orchestra; Manu Delago	The Haxan Cloak
11 July^{[C]}	Trenčín	Slovakia	Trenčín Airport	Heritage Orchestra; Manu Delago	The Haxan Cloak
16 July^{[D]}	Ostrava	Czech Republic	Dolní oblast Vítkovice	Heritage Orchestra; Manu Delago	The Haxan Cloak
20 July^{[E]}	Lyon	France	Ancient Theatre of Fourvière	Heritage Orchestra; Manu Delago	Arca
24 July	Barcelona	Spain	Poble Espanyol	Heritage Orchestra; Manu Delago	Arca
29 July^{[F]}	Rome	Italy	Auditorium Parco della Musica	Heritage Orchestra; Manu Delago	Arca
2 August^{[G]}	Berlin	Germany	Spandau Citadel	Heritage Orchestra; Manu Delago	The Haxan Cloak
7 August^{[H]}	Charlbury	England	Cornbury Park	Heritage Orchestra; Manu Delago	The Haxan Cloak

List of 2016 concerts
Date (2016)	City	Country	Venue	Players	Electronics
21 September	London	England	Royal Albert Hall	Aurora Orchestra	—N/a
24 September	London	England	Eventim Apollo	Aurora Orchestra	—N/a
5 November^{[I]}	Reykjavík	Iceland	Harpa	Iceland Symphony Orchestra	—N/a
8 November	Reykjavík	Iceland	Harpa	Iceland Symphony Orchestra	—N/a

List of 2017 concerts
Date (2017)	City	Country	Venue	Players	Electronics
29 March	Mexico City	Mexico	Auditorio Nacional	Odilón Chávez Orchestra	—N/a
2 April^{[J]}	Toluca	Mexico	Foro Pegaso	Odilón Chávez Orchestra	Arca
30 May	Los Angeles	United States	Walt Disney Concert Hall	Los Angeles Philharmonic	—N/a
21 July^{[K]}	Los Angeles	United States	Exposition Park	Los Angeles Philharmonic	Arca
31 July^{[L]}	Yuzawa	Japan	Naeba Ski Resort	Koichiro Muroya Strings	Arca
31 October^{[M]}	Tbilisi	Georgia	Tbilisi Concert Hall	Georgia Philharmonic Orchestra	—N/a
3 November^{[M]}	Tbilisi	Georgia	Georgian National Opera Theater	Georgia Philharmonic Orchestra	—N/a

Notes

^{A} This concert was a part of Governors Ball Music Festival
^{B} This concert was a part of Manchester International Festival
^{C} This concert was a part of Pohoda Festival
^{D} This concert was a part of Colours of Ostrava
^{E} This concert was a part of Nuits de Fourvière
^{F} This concert was a part of Luglio Suona Bene
^{G} This concert was a part of Citadel Music Festival

^{H} This concert was a part of Wilderness Festival
^{I} This concert was a part of Iceland Airwaves
^{J} This concert was part of the Ceremonia Festival
^{K} This concert was part of FYF Fest
^{L} This concert was part of the Fuji Rock Festival
^{M} These concerts were part of SOU Festival

=== Cancellations and rescheduled shows ===
4 April 2015	New York City, United States	New York City Center	The fourth show at the New York City Center was cancelled for undisclosed reasons. Instead, two shows at the Kings Theatre were added to the schedule.
15 August 2015	Saint-Malo, France	La Route du Rock	Cancelled due to scheduling conflict.
29 October 2015	Paris, France	Pitchfork Music Festival Paris	Cancelled due to scheduling conflict.
4 November 2015	Reykjavík, Iceland	Harpa	Cancelled due to scheduling conflict.
7 November 2015	Reykjavík, Iceland	Iceland Airwaves	Cancelled due to scheduling conflict.
1 April 2017	Toluca, Mexico	Foro Pegaso	Due to inclement weather damaging a stage at the Ceremonia Festival, the entire festival was initially cancelled before it was later announced that a condensed version of Ceremonia would take place the following day.
