= MTV Unplugged / Live =

Video by Björk
- Released: 9 February 2002
- Genre: Alternative
- Length: 1:11:06
- Label: One Little Indian
- Director: Justin Murphy; Russell Thomas

Björk chronology
Live in Cambridge (2001)	MTV Unplugged / Live (2002)	Live at Royal Opera House (2002)

Bjork on MTV: Unplugged & Live is an official DVD released by Björk on 9 February 2002. It features two complete MTV performances: the first show was recorded on MTV Unplugged in 1994 during the promotion of her album Debut and the second show was recorded on MTV Live in 1998 for the promotion of her album Homogenic. A cover of the track "My Funny Valentine" was performed on the MTV Unplugged performance but is not included on this DVD.

Fans were disappointed to find that both shows appear on the DVD as originally broadcast, with tracks cut short to fit into the syndicated slot. However, a fuller audio version of the MTV Unplugged performance appears on Debut Live, first released as part of the Live Box set in 2003 and later released separately in 2004. The DVD was re-released in 2003 to fix synchronisation problems, and to change the audio from mono to stereo on the MTV Unplugged part.

== Track listing ==
MTV Unplugged
No.	Title	Length
1.	"Human Behaviour"	4:08
2.	"One Day"	5:56
3.	"Come to Me"	3:45
4.	"Big Time Sensuality"	5:07
5.	"Aeroplane"	4:13
6.	"Like Someone in Love"	3:58
7.	"Crying"	4:01
8.	"Anchor Song"	3:25
9.	"Violently Happy"	5:49

MTV Live
No.	Title	Length
10.	"You've Been Flirting Again"	2:58
11.	"Isobel"	5:59
12.	"Human Behaviour"	3:53
13.	"Bachelorette"	2:32
14.	"Jóga"	5:45
15.	"Pluto"	9:37
