= Vespertine world tour =

2001 concert tour by Björk

- Tour by Björk
- Poster for the concerts at the Radio City Music Hall
- Associated album: Vespertine
- Start date: 18 August 2001
- End date: 21 December 2001
- No. of shows: 23 in Europe; 8 in North America; 3 in Asia; 34 total

Björk concert chronology
- At the Union Chapel (1999); Vespertine world tour (2001); Greatest Hits tour (2003)

The Vespertine world tour was a tour by the singer Björk that focused on her album Vespertine. She also performed songs from Debut, Post, Homogenic and Selmasongs. She performed 35 shows on this tour and 31 different songs. The tour band consisted of harpist Zeena Parkins, electronic duo Matmos, a Greenlandic choir and a 70-piece orchestra (local to each venue). The tour was released on DVD as Live at Royal Opera House and the concert held at the Orchard Hall in Tokyo, Japan was broadcast on Japanese TV-station WOWOW. A separate release, Vespertine Live, contains a selection of Björk's favourite performances from throughout the Vespertine tour, while a tour documentary, Minuscule, was also released.

In early August 2001, Björk confirmed the first set of dates for the Vespertine world tour which would take place at opera houses, theatres, and small venues, with favourable acoustics for the concerts. She enlisted Matmos, Zeena Parkins, a choir of Inuit girls from Greenland, and conductor Simon Lee; the tour opened at the Grand Rex in Paris on 18 August 2001. While in Paris, she held a press conference to discuss the album but gave no individual interviews saying that: "she'd rather do music than talk about it." While in France she also received the National Order of Merit at the Ministry of National Education in Paris. Another press conference was held in Barcelona on 3 November 2001 while touring in Spain. A 16 December 2001 performance at the Royal Opera House in London was released as the DVD Live at Royal Opera House in 2002. A DVD release featuring a behind-the-scenes look at the tour, titled Minuscule, was released at the end of 2003. Vespertine Live, a live album consisting of songs recorded during the Vespertine world tour, was included in the 2003 box set Live Box; it also includes a live version of "All Is Full of Love", a song from Homogenic.

== Opening acts ==
- Matmos

== Songs performed ==
Song	Album
"Frosti"	Vespertine
"Overture"	Selmasongs
"All Is Full of Love"	Homogenic
"Aurora"	Vespertine
"Undo"	Vespertine
"Unravel" (Live tour debut)	Homogenic
"I've Seen It All" (Live tour debut)	Selmasongs
"An Echo, A Stain"	Vespertine
"Generous Palmstroke"	Vespertine (b-side)
"Hidden Place"	Vespertine
"Cocoon"	Vespertine
"Unison"	Vespertine
"Harm of Will"	Vespertine
"It's Not up to You"	Vespertine
"Pagan Poetry"	Vespertine
"Possibly Maybe"	Post
"Isobel"	Post
"Hyperballad"	Post
"Human Behaviour"	Debut
"Jóga"	Homogenic
"It's In Our Hands" (Unreleased at the time)	Greatest Hits
"You've Been Flirting Again"	Post
"Army of Me"	Post
"Bachelorette"	Homogenic
"Play Dead"	Debut (b-side)
"Venus as a Boy"	Debut
"The Anchor Song"	Debut
"Who Is It" (Unreleased at the time)	Medúlla
"Pagan Poetry" (Music Box)	Vespertine (b-side)
"Aurora" (Music Box)	Vespertine (b-side)
"Gotham Lullaby" (Meredith Monk cover)	Meredith Monk cover

== Tour dates ==
Date	City	Country	Venue
Europe
18 August 2001	Paris	France	Le Grand Rex
20 August 2001	Paris	France	Le Grand Rex
23 August 2001	Paris	France	Sainte-Chapelle
25 August 2001	Paris	France	Sainte-Chapelle
29 August 2001	London	England	St John's, Smith Square
North America
6 September 2001	New York City	United States	Riverside Church
Europe
11 September 2001	Stuttgart	Germany	Liederhalle Hegel-Saal
13 September 2001	Lausanne	Switzerland	Salle Métropole
15 September 2001	Lausanne	Switzerland	Salle Métropole
18 September 2001	Frankfurt	Germany	Alte Oper
21 September 2001	Roubaix	France	Colisée
23 September 2001	London	England	The Coliseum
26 September 2001	Brussels	Belgium	Le Botanique
29 September 2001	Amsterdam	Netherlands	Muziektheater
North America
4 October 2001	New York City	United States	Radio City Music Hall
5 October 2001	New York City	United States	Radio City Music Hall
8 October 2001	Toronto	Canada	Hummingbird Centre
12 October 2001	Boston	United States	Wang Center
14 October 2001	Chicago	United States	Civic Opera House
17 October 2001	Oakland	United States	Paramount Theatre
22 October 2001	Los Angeles	United States	Dorothy Chandler Pavilion
Europe
1 November2001	Paris	France	Théâtre des Champs-Élysées
4 November 2001	Barcelona	Spain	Liceu
8 November 2001	Parma	Italy	Teatro Regio
10 November 2001	Rome	Italy	Teatro dell'Opera di Roma
13 November 2001	Cologne	Germany	Cologne Opera
15 November 2001	Berlin	Germany	Deutsche Oper
18 November 2001	Lyon	France	Auditorium Maurice-Ravel
Asia
2 December 2001	Tokyo	Japan	Hitomi Kinen Kōdō
5 December 2001	Tokyo	Japan	Bunkamura Orchard Hall
7 December 2001	Tokyo	Japan	Tokyo International Forum
Europe
16 December 2001	London	England	Royal Opera House
19 December 2001	Reykjavík	Iceland	Laugardalshöll
21 December 2001	Reykjavík	Iceland	Háskólabíó
