= All Neon Like =

Song by Björk

from the album Homogenic
- Released: 20 September 1997
- Studio: El Cortijo (Malaga, Spain)
- Genre: New-age; ambient; jungle
- Length: 5:55
- Label: One Little Indian
- Songwriter: Björk
- Producers: Björk; Mark Bell

"All Neon Like" is a song by Icelandic musician Björk. The song was written by Björk and produced by the singer and British producer Mark Bell for Björk's album Homogenic (1997).

== Background and development ==
techno-prayer

and I weave
the marvellous web
glow-in-the-dark threads
all neon-like
the larva surrounds me
so I can sleep
foetus-style

I'm asking for help
the luminous beam
to feed me
while I sleep

— Björk, July 1996

Snippets of the lyrics from "All Neon Like" were first released in the form of a poem entitled Techno Prayer, which Björk published in the July, 1996 edition of Details magazine. It featured thematic ideas that she would later explore in her 2001 studio album Vespertine, such as cocooning and thread-weaving. Björk confirmed the production and title of the track in an AOL chat interview in early 1997.

The song's production is a collaborative effort between Björk and LFO's Mark Bell, who was credited for the majority of the album's production. Björk had wanted Mark Bell to contribute to her albums Debut and Post, but he was only available for Homogenic. Like the rest of the album, it was recorded at El Cortijo Studios in Málaga, Spain.

== Composition ==
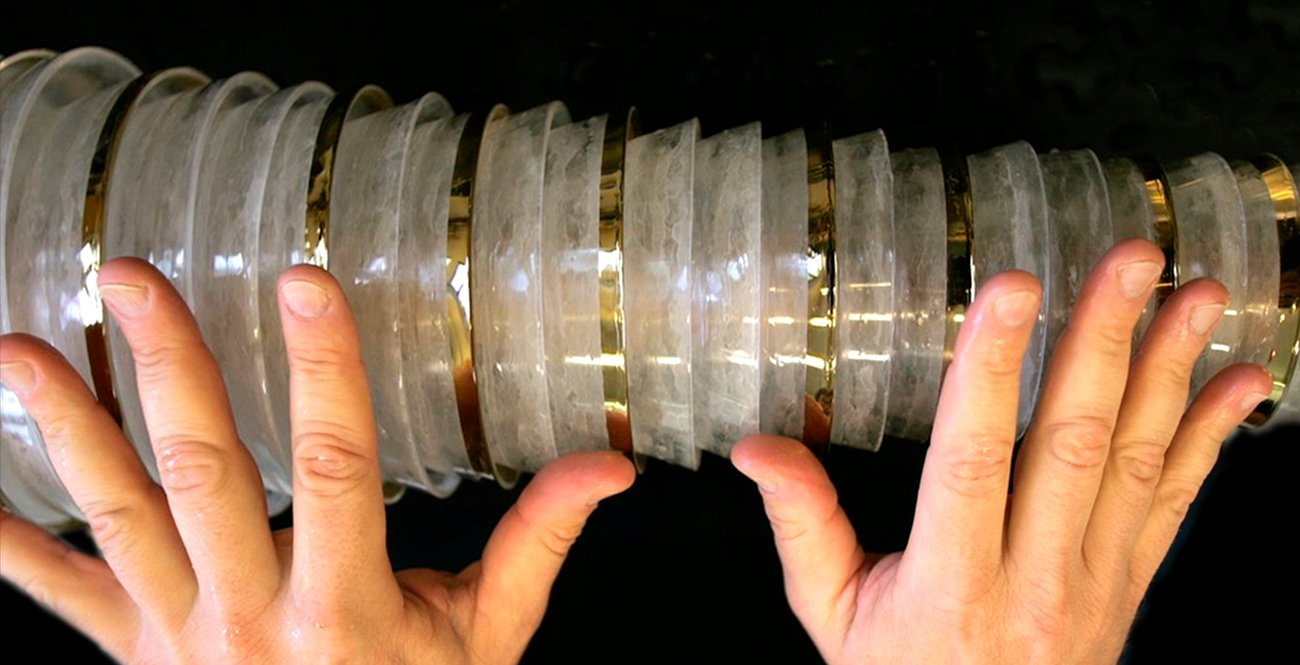
"All Neon Like" prominently features a glass harmonica played by Alasdair Malloy throughout the song.

With a length of five minutes and 55 seconds, "All Neon Like" is the album's longest track. It has been described as "spacey new age", and "ambient-jungle." For Entertainment Weekly's David Browne, Björk "sings along with the amelodic ambient and drum-and-bass rhythms, trying to do with techno what vocalese singers did with bebop nearly 50 years ago." According to AllMusic's Heather Phares, "All Neon Like" is an example of Homogenic's "soothing fare" tracks, which are alternated with "dark, uncompromising songs" like "Hunter." It features "a descending five-note synth figure [which] repeats against a subtly moving, starry-toned orchestral backdrop—gaining, losing, and regaining its bright prominence in the mix." The base of much of the track, especially the verses, is formed by the "hollow, sustained chimes" of the glass harmonica, played by Alasdair Malloy. These "wavering bell tones" are first heard at roughly the 0:29 mark. According to poet and frequent Björk collaborator Sjón, "it's a soundscape that pulsates and breathes like a living organism. It's [sic] heartbeat of a rhythm rises and gets closer to you as the song progresses."

Like various songs of the Homogenic sessions, including "So Broken", the subject matter of "All Neon Like" deals with suffering. Its lyrics "tell of a 'healing' that's made possible by some sort of a cyberspatial connection," and threads that "reach out to someone who's trapped in a cocoon of emotional/physical pain." Björk sings in the second-person, taking the position of a "healer". As she "feeds the 'sick' through the threads, he gains strength to start living again." According to Sia Michel of The New York Times, Björk "compares the creative process to a spider weaving a web made of glow-in-the-dark neon thread." Björk sings: "I'll cut a slit open/ And the luminous beam/ Feeds you honey!" This stanza demonstrates one element of her style, where she takes liberties with the English language for added effect. She "memorably furnishes the song's most emphatic word ('luminous') with an extra syllable: 'lou-min-NEE-ous.'" Björk's deliberate mispronunciation, which Gina Arnold dubbed "lingua-scat," can also be noted when she sings the words "nourish" and "foetus-style".

== Reception ==
"All Neon Like" has been met with acclaim from music critics. Spin's James Hunter wrote "hearing 'All Neon Like' is like being wordlessly ushered into a hypnotically proportioned room." Heather Phares of AllMusic described it as "gently percolating." In the Homogenic review for Pitchfork's Top 100 Albums of the 1990s, Dominique Leone thought the song was an example of "the album's compassionate, slightly off-center romanticism." In her album review for The New York Times, Sia Michel called it "gorgeous", and a track that "[imagines] a world in which Mother Nature rules supreme but technology enhances its beauty."

== Live performances ==
Björk presented this song and three others off the then-unreleased Homogenic album at the Tibetan Freedom Concert on June 6, 1997. "All Neon Like" opened the set, with Björk "[reaching] out to her audience, empathising and singing 'Don't get angry with yourself - I'll heal you.'" She performed with Mark Bell, who was raised at the rear of the stage surrounded by keyboards and sequencers, and with the Icelandic String Octet, conducted by Eumir Deodato, at one side of the stage. She wore a pink dress designed by Hussein Chalayan, which she would later wear in the video for "Bachelorette" and other photoshoots. That July, Björk performed the whole album for a press conference and presentation concert at the Old Truman Building, an old beer factory in London, wearing the same outfit. The song was also performed during the Homogenic promotional tour, which took place from August 31 to September 10, 1997; and was part of the set list of the Homogenic tour which Björk embarked upon with Mark Bell and the Icelandic String Octet from late 1997 to early 1999. A performance of "All Neon Like" at the Cambridge Corn Exchange during the tour was included in the video release Live in Cambridge (2001). Björk's August 1998 performance of the song in Spain was released in Homogenic Live, a live album of the tour included in the box set Live Box (2003).

Björk and The Brodsky Quartet performed a strings-only acoustic version in an intimate concert experience at London's Union Chapel on both 9 and 11 December 1999. A live album of the show was rumored to be released in 2000 but never materialized, though some tracks, including "All Neon Like", were featured on the "Strings" mini-CDs of Björk's 2002 box set, Family Tree

Björk next performed the song some 15 years later when it was played semi-regularly during the Vulnicura tour in 2015. This new version was a remix by Vulnicura's co-producer Arca and featured Manu Delago on percussion and the NY based orchestra Alarm Will Sound on strings. A live performance of the song was included in the limited edition Rough Trade exclusive double-CD release of Vulnicura Live in late 2015.

== Cover versions ==
In 1999, American jazz saxophonist Greg Osby covered the song, placing it on his 2002 album Inner Circle. Backed by pianist Jason Moran, bassist Tarus Mateen, and drummer Eric Harland, in this "mid-tempo burner," Osby soloes for just about the entirety of the track.

== See also ==
- Neon lighting
- List of songs recorded by Björk
