= Rósa Guðmundsdóttir =

Icelandic poet

Rósa Guðmundsdóttir (1795–1855), was an Icelandic poet. She was one of the best-known Icelandic poets of her time and is the author of many well-known Icelandic folk songs and poems.

In 1994, Björk performed Guðmundsdóttir's song Vísur Vatnsenda-Rósu for the album Chansons des mers froides.
