= Debut Live =

Live album by Björk
- Released: 1 June 2004
- Recorded: 7 November 1994; 17 June 1995
- Genre: Acoustic
- Length: 43:03
- Label: One Little Indian
- Producer: Various

Björk chronology
Live Box (2003)	Debut Live (2004)	Post Live (2004)

Debut Live is a live album by Icelandic singer Björk. While featuring live versions of songs from Debut, the album does not feature the songs as performed during the Debut tour from 1993–1994. Instead the majority of the CD comes from an acoustic performance of Debut on the MTV Unplugged television program. Originally released in the 5 disc Live Box set in 2003, Debut Live was later released separately on 1 June 2004 by One Little Indian records.

== Background ==
Björk was unhappy with the Debut tour, her first solo concert series after leaving the Sugarcubes. As she explained in the documentary Minuscule, "I did auditions and hired session people and everybody did what they were told. We rehearsed very well and the first show was like that and all the other shows were like that. So it was very nailed down. And I made a promise through that tour that I would never do that again… because most of all if I had told everybody what to do and how to do it I walk on stage and I'm bored stiff." In 2002 when she began combing her archive of live material to be released the following year, she settled on a special performance of Debut for MTV's iconic Unplugged series of concerts. This show was performed a month after the Debut tour concluded in late 1994 and features wildly different instrumentation and interpretations of the Debut songs.

Several artists joined Björk onstage, including Talvin Singh on tabla, Corky Hale on harp, Oliver Lake, the South Bank Gamelan Orchestra, and two artists who would become frequent collaborators: Guy Sigsworth and Leila Arab. Another collaboration would soon prove fruitful, that with deaf Scottish percussionist Evelyn Glennie. She and Björk went on to record a session together but only two of the songs have been released: "My Spine" (found on Björk's Post remix album Telegram in 1996) and "Oxygen" (found on Glennie's greatest hits album released in 1997).

The concert was held on 7 November 1994 in London. The set list included all of the songs from Debut except "There's More to Life Than This". Debut era B-sides "Atlantic" and "Play Dead", regulars on the Debut tour set lists, were not performed. Many of the songs were taken multiple times to perfect them for the TV broadcast, and the night was capped with a cover of Rodgers and Hart's "My Funny Valentine", a song Björk has never recorded in studio.

Björk's MTV Unplugged concert was released on DVD as part of the collection MTV Unplugged / Live on 9 February 2002.

Most of the tracks from Debut Live are taken from the MTV Unplugged show. For reasons unknown, Björk replaced the MTV show's performance of "Venus as a Boy" with her 1995 performance of the song at Later with Jools Holland. Her performance of "My Funny Valentine" has never been released, nor has the MTV Unplugged version of "Venus as a Boy". Six songs from MTV Unplugged had previously been featured in a special promotional CD called Celebrating Wood and Metal. It was a gift to the first 20,000 members of the official Björk fan club in 1997. The two CDs contain noticeably different mixes, particularly the audience applause which is nearly absent from the earlier promotional CD.

Debut Live was originally released as part of Live Box in 2003, a collection of Björk's first four live albums, in a period where Björk was releasing several compilations and side projects on CD and DVD. The collection was met with mixed reception; while critics praised Björk's performances and reinventions of her material, many felt the seemingly endless number of releases were simply a way to milk money from die-hard fans. A stand-alone Debut Live CD was released on 1 June 2004, months before Björk's fifth studio album Medúlla.

== Reception ==
AllMusic called it "a must for Björk fans" and commented that the eclectic group of instruments, "allow Björk's voice to masterfully guide the songs." Pitchfork was slightly more critical. While praising both Björk and her multi-cultural musicians, contributor Scott Plagenhoef felt that these stripped down versions of the Debut songs felt "muted" and that the singer let the new arrangements take center stage over her own performance.

== Track listing ==
All songs taken from Björk's MTV Unplugged concert from 7 November 1994 except where noted.

Debut Live track listing
No.	Title	Writer(s)	Length
1.	"Human Behaviour"	Björk; Nellee Hooper	4:09
2.	"One Day"	Björk	6:09
3.	"Venus as a Boy" (Later with Jools Holland, 17 June 1995)	Björk	2:33
4.	"Come to Me"	Björk	3:45
5.	"Big Time Sensuality"	Björk; Hooper	5:08
6.	"Aeroplane"	Björk	4:03
7.	"Like Someone in Love"	Johnny Burke; Jimmy Van Heusen	4:01
8.	"Crying"	Björk; Hooper	4:12
9.	"The Anchor Song"	Björk	3:25
10.	"Violently Happy"	Björk; Hooper	5:44
Total length:			43:03
