= Vísur Vatnsenda-Rósu =

Song
- Language: Icelandic
- English title: Verses by Rosa of Vatnsendi
- Written: 1800s (lyrics)
- Composers: Traditional, arranged by Jón Ásgeirsson (1960)
- Lyricist: Rósa Guðmundsdóttir

Vísur Vatnsenda-Rósu (English: "Verses by Rósa of Vatnsendi") is a traditional Icelandic song. The lyrics are a poem written by Rósa Guðmundsdóttir (1795–1855); the melody is a traditional lullaby, arranged by Jón Ásgeirsson (1928–) in 1960.

== Lyrics ==
Augað mitt og augað þitt,
ó, þá fögru steina,
mitt er þitt og þitt er mitt,
þú veizt, hvað eg meina.

Langt er síðan sá eg hann,
sannlega fríður var hann,
allt, sem prýða mátti einn mann,
mest af lýðum bar hann.

Þig eg trega manna mest
mædd af tára flóði,
ó, að við hefðum aldrei sést,
elsku vinurinn góði.

Engan leit eg eins og þann
álma hreyti bjarta.
Einn guð veit eg elskaði hann
af öllum reit míns hjarta.

Þó að kali heitur hver,
hylji dali og jökul ber,
steinar tali og allt, hvað er,
aldrei skal eg gleyma þér.

Augað snart er tárum tært,
tryggð í partast mola,
mitt er hjartað sárum sært,
svik er hart að þola.

Beztan veit eg blóma þinn,
blíðu innst í reitum.
Far vel Eyjafjörður minn,
fegri öllum sveitum.

Man eg okkar fyrri fund,
forn þó ástin réni.
Nú er eins og hundur hund
hitti á tófugreni.

English translation:

My eye and your eye,
oh, those beautiful stones,
mine is yours and yours is mine,
you know what I mean.

Long it's been since I saw him,
truly beautiful he was,
all that could adorn one man,
he excelled most among men.

For you I grieve most of all men,
worn by a flood of tears,
oh, that we had never met,
my dear good friend.

I never saw another like that
shining man.
God alone knows I loved him
with every inch of my heart.

Though hot geysers should freeze,
valleys should cover with glaciers bare,
stones should speak and all that is,
never will I forget you.

The eye is quickly clear of tears,
loyalty breaks to pieces,
my heart is wounded,
betrayal is hard to endure.

Best I know your blossom,
the beauty deep in your fields
Farewell, my Eyjafjörður,
the fairest of lands.

I recall our first meeting,
though ancient love recedes.
Now it's like two dogs should
meet at a fox's den

== In popular culture ==
The song is most famous for its performance for Hector Zazou's album Chansons des mers froides (Songs from the cold seas) by Icelandic singer Björk; it also appears on Björk's third Possibly Maybe single CD.

It has also been performed by the Swedish artist Nåid, Icelandic singer Ragnheiður Gröndal, and Belgian folk band Griff.

In the film Zack Snyder's Justice League, “Vísur Vatnsenda-Rósu” is sung by a group of Icelandic villagers as Arthur Curry / Aquaman dives into the ocean after meeting Bruce Wayne / Batman. The village, where Batman first meets Aquaman, seems to be reliant on the latter for survival and to have built him up as a quasi-mythical figure.
