= Unravel (Björk song) =

Song by Björk

from the album Homogenic
- Released: 22 September 1997
- Recorded: 1996–1997
- Studio: El Cortijo (Marbella)
- Genre: Avant-pop
- Length: 3:21
- Label: One Little Indian • Elektra
- Composer: Björk
- Lyricists: Björk; Guy Sigsworth
- Producer: Björk

"Unravel" is the third song on the album Homogenic by Björk, which was released in 1997. The song features a prominent example of Björk's use of a half-singing, half-speaking technique which, according to folklorist Njáll Sigurðsson, is comparable to that of Old Icelandic choirmen.

== Composition and themes ==
Structurally, the song is made up of a slowly sweeping melody, saxophones, a church organ, and distant-sounding electronic beats. Thematically, the song describes two faraway lovers. One of the lovers realizes that the love between the two of them is unraveling because of factors out of their control. The lover, Björk, seeks to reunite with her lover to rebuild the love lost.

== Music video ==
Even though "Unravel" was not released as a single, a music video was made by Lynn Fox to promote Björk's Greatest Hits tour. The video won a silver prize at the 2004 D&AD Awards, an event recognizing annual achievements in design and advertising. The video itself depicts Björk in a deep sea-like environment, wearing a billowing dress as a large and furry unidentified sea creature grows out of her back in a strings-like manner.

== Other artists ==
In a 2006 interview with Spin, the Radiohead singer Thom Yorke said "Unravel" was his favourite song ever. Radiohead performed a cover of "Unravel" in a 2007 webcast. The Brazilian singer Alice Caymmi released a cover on her 2012 debut album. The Florida sludge metal group Ether Coven covered the song on their 2020 album Everything Is Temporary Except Suffering. English songwriters Wayne Hussey and Julianne Regan featured a cover of the song on their collaborative album Curios. The American rock band Something Corporate released a cover of the song as a bonus track on some editions of their third studio album, North.
