= Vessel (video) =

Video by Björk
- Released: 5 September 1994; 13 January 2003 (DVD reissue)
- Recorded: 15 May 1994
- Venue: The Royalty Theatre (London, England)
- Length: 57:11
- Label: One Little Indian
- Director: Stéphane Sednaoui
- Producer: Elektra Entertainment

Björk chronology
Vessel (1994)	Live at Shepherds Bush Empire (1998)

Vessel is the first live long-form video by Icelandic musician Björk, directed by Stéphane Sednaoui and produced by Elektra Entertainment. It was released in VHS on 5 September 1994, by One Little Indian, with a DVD reissue taking place on 13 May 2003. The release documents a concert by the artist during the 1994 tour held in support of her studio album Debut (1993). It contains ten songs from the album, in addition to a B-side; an interview with Björk is interspersed throughout the setlist. Vesse/ was subject to mixed reviews from music critics, who had polarizing opinions on both the performances and Sednaoui's editing.

== Background and release ==
Björk released her second studio album Debut on One Little Indian in July 1993, garnering positive reviews and commercial success. A tour was launched later that year in support of the album, with concerts throughout the UK, Europe and the United States. It was released on 5 September 1994 on VHS.

== Content and reception ==
Vessel contains Björk's concert at The Royalty Theater, recorded on 15 May 1994, during which she performed the entirety of Debut, except for the song "Like Someone in Love". The song "Atlantic", released on the cassette single of "Human Behaviour" and the Japanese version of the album, was also included on the setlist. An interview with Björk, presented in black and white, is interspersed throughout the video, showing Björk discussing a variety of themes, such as "her dreams, the art of touring, music, and even some favorite recipes", as Catherine Applefeld wrote in Billboard. Vessel was directed by the European artist Stéphane Sednaoui and digitally mastered by Francis Milano and George Reisz; it was noted to have a "lots of different camera angles, fades, rapid zooms and a preponderance of close-ups". its packaging and title sequence were designed by Me Company.

The set elicited mixed reviews from critics. Representing AllMusic, Heather Phares likened Vessel to "a time capsule of her work and image" at the time it was recorded, although he observed that it was not the "definitive representation of the Björk live experience". The critic also favored Sedanoui's work on the video. David Eimer of The Wire was critical of the approach taken with the live renditions, opining that Nellee Hooper's production was substituted by an "utterly conventional House beat". Eimer also opined that the interview with Björk did not portray her as "articulate or eloquent". In addition, he felt that the video fell short of the evolution of video technology, recognizing the inclusion of basic visual effects. University of Michigan–Dearborn's The Michigan Journal assessed that the recorded repertoire "sounds better live than on CD", complimenting the performance by Björk and the band.

== Track listing ==
No.	Title	Writer(s)	Length
1.	"Human Behaviour"	Björk; Nellee Hooper	4:48
2.	"Atlantic"	Björk	3:27
3.	"One Day"	Björk	7:19
4.	"Venus as a Boy"	Björk	6:08
5.	"Come to Me"	Björk	7:00
6.	"Anchor Song"	Björk	3:18
7.	"Aeroplane"	Björk	5:23
8.	"Big Time Sensuality"	Björk; Hooper	3:18
9.	"There's More to Life Than This"	Björk; Hooper	4:20
10.	"Violently Happy"	Björk; Hooper	5:56
11.	"Crying"	Björk; Hooper	6:14
