= Live at Shepherds Bush Empire (Björk video) =

Video by Björk
- Released: 16 November 1998; 19 November 2001 (DVD reissue)
- Recorded: 27 February 1997
- Venue: Shepherd's Bush Empire (London, England)
- Length: 1:16:00
- Label: One Little Indian
- Director: David Barnard

Björk chronology
Vessel (1994)	Live at Shepherds Bush Empire (1998)	Volumen (1998)

Live at Shepherds Bush Empire is an official VHS released by Björk on 16 November 1998. The live show was recorded at the end of the Post tour on 27 February 1997, at a special fan-club only free concert at the Shepherd's Bush Empire in London, England. The majority of the songs are taken from the album Post, as well as some from her album Debut. The track "I Go Humble" is a B-side, and appears on the "Isobel" single.

Many of the performances from this concert can be found on the Post Live album, released as part of the Live Box set in 2003 and later made available separately. The song that appears over the end credits is "Glóra", a flute instrumental recorded when Björk was in The Elgar Sisters. Two songs that were performed at this show were omitted from the release, "It's Oh So Quiet" and "Sweet Intuition", which were performed at the beginning of the show. It was re-released on DVD on 19 November 2001.

== Track listing ==
1. "Headphones" 3:20
2. "Army of Me" 3:42
3. "One Day" 3:39
4. "The Modern Things" 3:51
5. "Venus as a Boy" 6:04
6. "You've Been Flirting Again" 4:16
7. "Isobel" 5:27
8. "Possibly Maybe" 5:18
9. "I Go Humble" 7:03
10. "Big Time Sensuality" 4:52
11. "Hyperballad" 5:04
12. "Enjoy" 3:40
13. "Human Behaviour" 3:32
14. "Anchor Song (Alagándose Moir)" 10:17
15. "I Miss You" 3:59
16. "Crying" 6:07
17. "Violently Happy" 5:57
18. ”Glóra" 1:43
