= Debut tour =

1993–94 concert tour by Björk

- Tour by Björk
- Poster for the concert held at the Empress Ballroom in Blackpool
- Associated album: Debut
- Start date: 19 August 1993
- End date: 31 July 1994
- No. of shows: 34 in Europe; 7 in North America; 5 in Oceania; 4 in Asia; 50 total

Björk concert chronology
- Debut tour (1993–94); Post tour (1995–97)

The Debut tour was the first tour by Icelandic singer-songwriter Björk, and it mainly focused on her album Debut. She toured from 1993 to 1994. The tour was released on VHS and DVD as Vessel. A separate release, Debut Live, contains material from the 1993 MTV Unplugged performance, which features a much larger set of backing musicians, noted for their wide variety.

== Set list ==
This set list is from the 17 February 1994 concert in Paris, France. It is not intended to represent all concerts for the tour.

1. "Human Behaviour"
2. "Atlantic"
3. "One Day"
4. "Venus as a Boy"
5. "Come to Me"
6. "The Anchor Song"
7. "Aeroplane"
8. "Play Dead"
9. "Crying"
10. "Violently Happy"
11. "There's More to Life Than This"
12. "Big Time Sensuality"

Encore

13. "Army of Me" (Note: Unreleased at the time. Later released on Post (1995))
14. "The Modern Things"

=== Other songs performed ===
- During the 19 August 1993 show in London, Björk performed "Like Someone in Love", "Síðasta Ég" and "Stígðu Mig".
- An unreleased song, tentatively called "Moðir", was performed during the 25 June 1994 show in Pilton.

== Tour dates ==
List of 1993 concerts
Date (1993)	City	Country	Venue	Opening act
19 August	London	England	The Forum	—N/a
21 August^{[A]}	London	England	Wembley Stadium	—N/a
9 September^{[B]}	Aarhus	Denmark	Århushallen	—N/a
11 September^{[C]}	Lommel	Belgium	Kattenbos	—N/a
13 September	Wolverhampton	England	Civic Hall	—N/a
14 September	Manchester	England	Manchester Academy	—N/a
9 November	New York City	United States	Webster Hall	Ultramarine
11 November	Boston	United States	The Avalon	Ultramarine
13 November	Toronto	Canada	The Opera House	Ultramarine
16 November	Chicago	United States	Park West	Ultramarine
17 November	San Francisco	United States	The Warfield	Ultramarine
19 November	Los Angeles	United States	Wiltern Theatre	Ultramarine
22 November	Tilburg	Netherlands	Noorderligt	Ultramarine
24 November	Berlin	Germany	Huxleys Neue Welt	Ultramarine
25 November	Munich	Germany	Zeppelinhalle	Ultramarine
28 November	Amsterdam	Netherlands	Paradiso	Ultramarine
29 November	Düsseldorf	Germany	Tor 3	Ultramarine
1 December^{[D]}	Rennes	France	La Cité	—N/a
3 December	Brussels	Belgium	La Luna	Ultramarine
5 December	Copenhagen	Denmark	Pumpehuset	Ultramarine
6 December	Hamburg	Germany	Große Freiheit	Ultramarine
8 December	Stockholm	Sweden	Club Gino	Ultramarine
10 December	Oslo	Norway	Sentrum Scene	Ultramarine
19 December	Manchester	England	Manchester Academy	Ultramarine

List of 1994 concerts
Date (1994)	City	Country	Venue	Opening act(s)
21 January^{[E]}	Gold Coast	Australia	Gold Coast Parklands	—N/a
23 January^{[E]}	Melbourne	Australia	Royal Melbourne Showgrounds	—N/a
26 January^{[E]}	Sydney	Australia	Sydney Showground	—N/a
29 January^{[E]}	Adelaide	Australia	Royal Adelaide Showgrounds	—N/a
2 February^{[E]}	Fremantle	Australia	Fremantle Oval	—N/a
3 February	Osaka	Japan	Shinsaibashi Club Quattro	—N/a
7 February	Tokyo	Japan	Shibuya On Air East	—N/a
8 February	Tokyo	Japan	Shibuya On Air East	—N/a
9 February	Tokyo	Japan	Shibuya On Air East	—N/a
17 February	Paris	France	Élysée Montmartre	—N/a
18 February	Paris	France	Élysée Montmartre	—N/a
19 February	Madrid	Spain	Pacha	—N/a
24 February	London	England	Royalty Theatre	—N/a
26 February	London	England	Brixton Academy	The Black Dog
23 May^{[F]}	Landgraaf	Netherlands	Megaland	—N/a
25 May	Los Angeles	United States	Glam Slam West	—N/a
8 June^{[G]}	London	England	The Astoria	—N/a
9 June	Milan	Italy	City Square	—N/a
19 June^{[H]}	Reykjavík	Iceland	Laugardalshöll	Bubbleflies; Underworld
25 June^{[I]}	Pilton	England	Worthy Farm	—N/a
28 June^{[J]}	Roskilde	Denmark	Festivalpladsen	—N/a
2 July^{[K]}	Belfort	France	Presqu'île de Malsaucy	—N/a
22 July	Blackpool	England	Empress Ballroom	Saint Etienne; 808 State
27 July	Blackpool	England	Empress Ballroom	808 State
30 July^{[L]}	Lanarkshire	Scotland	Strathclyde Country Park	—N/a
31 July^{[M]}	Thurles	Ireland	Semple Stadium	—N/a

Festivals and other miscellaneous performance

^{A} Opening act for U2's Zoo TV Tour
^{B} This concert was a part of Kosmopolitan, during Aarhus Festuge
^{C} This concert was a part of Rockwood Festival
^{D} This concert was a part of Rencontres Trans Musicales
^{E} These concerts were part of Big Day Out
^{F} This concert was a part of Pinkpop Festival
^{G} This concert was a part of G-A-Y AIDS benefit
^{H} This concert was a part of The Arts Festival
^{I} This concert was a part of Glastonbury Festival
^{J} This concert was a part of Roskilde Festival
^{K} This concert was a part of Eurockéennes
^{L} This concert was a part of T in the Park
^{M} This concert was a part of Féile Festival

== Personnel ==
All credits adapted from Vessel.

Band

- Björk – vocals
- Ike Leo – bass
- Leila Arab – keyboards
- Guy Sigsworth – keyboards, programming
- Dan Lipman – sax, flute, tambourine
- Tansay Omar – drums
- Talvin Singh – tablas, percussion

Technical

- Laurie Small – touring manager
- Paul Normandale – lighting director
- Chris Ridgeway – live sound
- Dikka Jones – stage manager
- Phil Murphy – stage technician
- Lite Alternative – lighting
- Wigwam Acoustics – P.A.
- The Omnibuss Mobile – mobile recording
