= The Best Mixes from the Album-Debut for All the People Who Don't Buy White-Labels =

Remix album by Björk
- Released: 26 September 1994
- Genre: Electronic
- Length: 41:41
- Label: Polydor
- Producer: Nellee Hooper; Björk

Björk chronology
Debut (1993)	The Best Mixes from the Album-Debut for All the People Who Don't Buy White-Labels (1994)	Post (1995)

The Best Mixes from the Album-Debut for All the People Who Don't Buy White-Labels is the first EP and remix compilation by Björk, originally released through Polydor Records in September 1994. The collection contains six remixes of four tracks from Björk's 1993 album Debut ("Human Behaviour", "One Day", "Come to Me" and "The Anchor Song"). All of the songs were written solely by Björk except "Human Behaviour", which was co-written by Nellee Hooper. Björk and Hooper were also co-producers of the EP. "Human Behaviour" was remixed by the English electronic group Underworld; the remaining five tracks are remixes by The Sabres of Paradise and Black Dog. The compilation has been re-issued through the record labels One Little Indian, PolyGram and PO Records (in Japan).

== Composition ==
The EP, totaling 41 minutes and 41 seconds in length, consists of six remixes of four different tracks from Björk's 1993 album Debut. The collection begins with the English electronic group Underworld's remix of "Human Behaviour", where, according to AllMusic's Neg Raggett, the swing "stutter" of the original recording's percussion is replaced by "crisp disco" beats and high tempo funk loops. The track also features samples of Björk's vocals and ends with a piano performance. The remaining five tracks are remixes by The Sabres of Paradise and Black Dog. The second and sixth tracks are both remixes of "One Day" by The Sabres of Paradise. The "Endorphin" mix features light piano and lightly reverberated vocals by Björk over a slow beat, while the version which closes the EP includes more upbeat, "crisp" electronic percussion. The collection's fourth track, The Sabres of Paradise's remix of "Come to Me", features heavily reverberated vocals by Björk which echo over a "quiet" collection of beats. Black Dog's remix of "Come to Me" has been described as "Arabic/techno fusion". Their version of "The Anchor Song" includes a short loop and an a cappella vocal section halfway through the track.

Four of the remixes are from a five-part promotional vinyl series issued in 1993. "Human Behaviour (Underworld Mix)" is the most commonly heard remix in this collection, having been featured on the "Human Behaviour" CD single, while "Come to Me (Sabres of Paradise)" is exclusive to this collection. The two Black Dog remixes were previously released on 10" promo "Björk Bitten by Black Dog" in addition to various CD singles, while the two "One Day" remixes had been, prior to this remix collection, exclusive to the 10" promo "Björk Cut by the Sabres of Paradise".

== Critical reception ==
Professional ratings
Review scores
Source	Rating
AllMusic	3/5 stars
Music Week	4/5 stars
Select	2/5 medals

Ned Raggett of AllMusic awarded the EP three stars out of five. He considered "Human Behavior" the highlight of the collection, calling it a "masterpiece" and a high quality showcase for Underworld. Raggett also said the closing piano performance added "unexpected charm and power" to the remix. He called The Sabres of Paradise's "Endorphin" remix of "One Day" a "slice of loveliness", preferring this version to the group's "Springs Eternal" version of the same song. Raggett complimented the fushion sounds of Black Dog's remix of "Come to Me" as well as the "nicely strange" loop and the a cappella vocals in "The Anchor Song".

== Track listing ==
All tracks written by Björk except "Human Behaviour" by Björk and Nellee Hooper.

No.	Title	Length
1.	"Human Behaviour" (The Underworld Mix 110 BPM)	12:07
2.	"One Day" (Endorphin Mix 52.5 BPM)	5:10
3.	"Come to Me" (Black Dog Mix)	5:05
4.	"Come to Me" (Sabres of Paradise)	4:55
5.	"The Anchor Song" (Black Dog Mix)	4:49
6.	"One Day" (Springs Eternal Mix 105 BPM)	9:48

== Personnel ==
- Björk – composition, primary artist, vocals
- Darren Emerson – production, remixing
- Nellee Hooper – composition, production
- Rick Smith – production, remixing

== Charts ==
Chart performance for The Best Mixes from the Album Debut for All the People Who Don't Buy White Labels
Chart (1994)	Peak position
Australia (ARIA)	188
New Zealand (Recorded Music NZ)	28

== Release history ==
The Best Mixes from the Album-Debut was first released in 1994 through Polydor Records. Since then the collection has been issued through the record labels One Little Indian, PolyGram and PO Records (in Japan).

Date	Label	Format
1994	Polydor	CD
1994	One Little Indian	CD
1994	One Little Indian	LP
1994	Polydor / One Little Indian	Digipak
1997	PolyGram	CD
1998	Polydor / One Little Indian	CD
2002	PO Records (Japan)	CD

Release history adapted from AllMusic.

The EP was released in Australia on 28 November 1994.

== See also ==
- Audio mixing (recorded music)
- List of best-selling remix albums worldwide
- Underworld discography
- White label
