= Army of Me =

1995 single by Björk

- UK CD version cover

Single by Björk

from the album Post
- B-side: "Cover Me"; "You've Been Flirting Again"; "Sweet Intuition"
- Released: 24 April 1995
- Studio: Fon (Sheffield)
- Genre: Industrial rock; trip hop
- Length: 3:55
- Label: One Little Indian
- Songwriters: Björk; Graham Massey
- Producers: Björk; Nellee Hooper; Graham Massey

Björk singles chronology
"Violently Happy" (1994)	"Army of Me" (1995)	"Isobel" (1995)

Music video
- "Army of Me" on YouTube

"Army of Me" is a song by the Icelandic musician Björk for her second studio album, Post (1995). It was released on 24 April 1995 by One Little Indian as the lead single from the album. The song was written and produced by Björk and Graham Massey, who helped her in producing and writing the majority of her album. Lyrically, the song was inspired by the damaging behavior of Björk's brother, and in the lyrics she tells him to stand up to regain control of his life. It was well received by music critics, who noted its darkness compared to her other material. "Army of Me" was a commercial success, being her first single to enter the top 10 of the UK Singles Chart.

Björk premiered the song on some gigs during the Debut tour before the release of the album. She performed it in a series of TV appearances, and notably, for the first time on Top of the Pops with Skunk Anansie. Additionally, the song was performed on every date of the Post tour. The song was featured on Björk's compilation album, Greatest Hits (2002).

The song's accompanying music video was directed by frequent collaborator Michel Gondry. It features the singer driving an enormous vehicle through a city, fighting a gorilla dentist to get back a diamond he took from her mouth, and bombing a museum with dynamite to free a boy. In 2005, Björk released a UNICEF charity benefit compilation entitled Army of Me: Remixes and Covers, which featured a series of covers and remixes by artists from all over the world.

== Background ==
I'm a polar bear and I'm with five hundred polar bears, just tramping over a city. The lyric is about people who feel sorry for themselves all the time and don't get their shit together. You come to a point with people like that where you've done everything you can do for them, and the only thing that's going to sort them out is themselves. It's time to get things done. I identify with polar bears. They're very cuddly and cute and quite calm, but if they meet you they can be very strong.

— Björk talking to Jon Savage about the song.

"Army of Me" was written in 1992 by Björk and Graham Massey, during one of the first recording sessions for Debut, along with "The Modern Things", but Björk decided to put the songs on hold and to wait for releasing them. Even so, Björk performed the songs during some dates on her Debut tour. The singer further explained the song: "Imagine you're in a club full of heavy metal types and grunge people; 'Army of Me' is like someone's granny blasting out over the PA and saying, 'Snap out of it! Stop whining! Wash your hair! Smarten yourself up!'"

The single was released in the United Kingdom on 24 April 1995 as a cassette and two-CD single. The first CD contained the Icelandic version of "You've Been Flirting Again" and the cave version of "Cover Me", both from Post. The cave version of "Cover Me" was recorded in a cave in Bahamas, and sounds of flying bats can be heard in the background. The single also contained "Sweet Intuition", a song composed by Björk and Black Dog, which would form the lyrical basis for the composition of another song written by Björk for Madonna: "Bedtime Story". The second CD contained, among other remixes, a version of "Army of Me" featuring Skunk Anansie. The track was recorded and mixed in less than seven hours, as recalled by the band, and features Björk screaming.

== Composition ==
"Army of Me"
The chorus of the song, with drums and electronic bass in the background.

"Army of Me" is an aggressive industrial rock and trip hop song with elements of techno dominated by a heavy bassline in C Locrian. The song's drum part is sampled from Led Zeppelin's "When the Levee Breaks". Mim Udovitch has described the song as "grinding techno fusion".

The lyrics of the song are about Björk's brother, as revealed by the singer, and show Björk daring him to move up and find a job to keep his life on, and also for him to not fall into bad things and learn to defend himself: "It's actually written to a relative of mine who had been a bit out of order for a while. I'm not sure why I wrote it. Maybe I felt that Debut had been such a polite, shy album – there was a side of me that was so shy and such a beginner, I was very flattered when everyone loved Debut but also a bit confused because it wasn't really me. Maybe 'Army Of Me' was an attempt to balance it out." In the chorus of the song she sings: "And if you complain once more/You'll meet an army of me!"

== Critical reception ==
In a positive review, Heather Phares of AllMusic stated that "'Army of Me' casts Björk against type as a warrior goddess fed up with whining, instead of her usual cyber-pixie persona...the song's pounding industrial beat, menacing synth bass, and unusually aggressive lyrics ('And if you complain once more / You'll meet an army of me') stand in sharp contrast to the rest of the album and to most of her previous work." Eric Handerson of Slant Magazine found that the song "provocatively merges a Weather Report-esque jazz-fusion bass riff with a heavy-timbered rock drumbeat to match her contemptuous vocal delivery ('Self-sufficience, please!')" Natalie Curtis described the song as "inelegant"; Mim Udovitch of Rolling Stone dubbed it "ominous, anthemic", with Lou Stathis of MTV calling it "booming, martial-march techno". According to Brantley Bardin of Details, 'Army of Me' is "the album’s straightest song, a manifesto about self-sufficiency", while for Liz Hoggard of The Observer, the track is "brutal yet tender". Stuart Maconie of Q magazine praised the song by stating that its lyrics carries "bold and refreshing sentiments for a rock song. Refreshingly Icelandic sentiments", and further stating that "'Army Of Me' not only sounds fabulous—Led Zeppelin and techno welded together into a surging, operatic whole—but possesses a briskly pull-yourself-together tone. 'Stand up, you’ve got to manage ... /You're all right, there's nothing wrong / ... get to work / and if you complain once more, you'll meet an army of me".

Pan-European magazine Music & Media wrote, "Chased by an extremely dangerous synth baseline and drums, the Icelandic siren with the most peculiar vocal technique – even her breathing is special – accelerates whenever its necessary." In a separate review, 'Army of Me' was named "a perfect and credible first single, although less adapted to radio than 'Human Behaviour'." Music Week gave the song three out of five, saying that "the long-awaited return isn't quite the quirky pop we come to expect from the singer but a more brooding, darker affair". They added, "Expect healthy chart action." Bidisha from NME opined that "Bjork's quirk-by-numbers 'Army of Me' sounds like pretend music played on squeaky toy synthesisers." Another NME editor, Ted Kessler, wrote, "The song's main malaise is its lack of tune or colour, augmented by a vocal performance that feels flat and uncommitted. It's like the forlorn, sickly, weakling little sister of 'Human Behaviour', full of dizzy bass and drums that busily lead nowhere..." According to The New York Times writer Joy Press, "'Army of Me' is so menacing and inorganic-sounding it verges on industrial rock", and in a review, Pulse! defined the song "a staggering juggernaut of a track". While reviewing Post, Andy Smith of The Providence Journal stated that "Post is an eclectic affair, opening with the assertive industrial clang of 'Army of Me'". Andy Beevers from the RM Dance Update noted that the song "is built around a downtempo beat and a dirty great throbbing synth line with the unmistakable and defiant vocals soaring above." Gavin Reeve from Smash Hits named it one of two "top destinations" of the album, with 'It's Oh So Quiet'.

In 1995, 'Army of Me' won an Icelandic Music Award for Song of the Year. The song was also ranked number 316 in Blender magazine's "The 500 Greatest Songs Since You Were Born". In 2012, the song was ranked number 71 in Consequence of Sound's "Top 100 Songs Ever".

== Music video ==
=== Background ===
For the music video of the song, Björk collaborated again with French film director Michel Gondry, who had previously directed the video for "Human Behaviour" in 1993. In the video, Björk is the driver of a tanker truck. The singer "said that she wanted to capture that 'tanker-truck' feeling, the sense of a big machine grinding unstoppably through town" and further stated: "I thought I should be driving a very, very big truck to try to wake this person who's asleep, so I get the biggest truck in the world, and I'm so mad I've got metallic teeth, because when you're really angry, you grind your teeth. So I have to go to the dentist, who tries to steal away from me a diamond I don't know I have."

The dentist is actually a gorilla, and Björk explained:

When [Gondry] gets his strokes of genius and, in the video for "Army of Me", wants a dentist that's a gorilla to find a diamond in my mouth, some people call it nonsense. But it's probably the most realistic way of expressing what situation I'm in – all these people trying to take things away from me, and the gorilla finding a diamond that I don't know I have and then stealing it. "Army of Me" is so much about me actually learning that I have to defend myself. I have to stand up and fight the fucking gorilla. Once I've got the diamond and I run away with it, it becomes massive 'cos it's mine. But if the gorilla had kept it, it would have gone really tiny. That's surrealism for me.

Björk and her label declined to use footage from the film Tank Girl (which features the track on its soundtrack) in the music video for "Army of Me".

=== Synopsis ===
Björk with a diamond in her mouth in the music video.

The first seconds of the music video show a young man in cryonic slumber. It then cuts to Björk, wearing a black karate gi, driving a large vehicle through a city. The passers-by seem to ignore the mass of the vehicle. The vehicle begins to sputter and slow, prompting Björk to check the motor. Before floating off the vehicle, she turns to the camera and shows metallic teeth. The vehicle's engine assembly consists of a mouth in which all of the teeth appear rotten, comically exaggerated by a shaggy-looking man engulfed in a stench-cloud crawling out of the mouth and offending passers-by.

Björk touches her cheek, appearing to have a toothache, and proceeds to a nearby dentist's office. While she is going to the room of the dentist, her image appears reflected in a series of mirrors that make it impossible to distinguish her real self. She is examined by the dentist, an anthropomorphic gorilla, who discovers a diamond in her mouth. The dentist attempts to steal the diamond for himself, but Björk leaps onto his back and pummels him, and, retrieving the diamond, escapes the office. She takes the diamond back to her vehicle, all the while it multiplies in size until she is barely able to carry it. Björk tosses the diamond into the vehicle's mouth, apparently correcting its earlier affliction.

She then drives to a museum and proceeds inside, carrying a satchel containing a bomb. Sneaking past the museum's guards, she places the bomb on one of the exhibits – the young man seen in the beginning of the video lying on an altar in a deep sleep. She then bolts toward the museum's exit, concerning the guards and other patrons. She makes it out of the building just moments before the bomb explodes. After the explosion, she re-enters the building to find the man from the altar, who appears to have been just wakened by the blast. Björk hugs him, crying teardrops of jewels.

=== Reception ===
The video was well received by critics. Quoted by Tim Walker of The Independent, The New Yorker’s music critic, Sasha Frere-Jones describes “Army of Me”: "catchy, commercial song that was utterly original, and she's easily beautiful enough to have taken advantage of her sexuality in the video, but instead she got Michel Gondry to make a brilliant promo about her going to a gorilla dentist to get a huge diamond pulled out of her mouth". Gondry's visual imagery was heavily praised: "Gondry is a treat with visual details in defining his realities, and he provides in 'Army of Me'. The museum sequence furnishes an example: Before Björk bombs it, there are many artworks on the walls, each piece reflecting the apparent banality of the museum. One area shows a person observing a work which is a painting of a person in an art museum observing a work. After the explosion, everything is torn apart, bathed in smoke. Björk comes and retrieves her loved one, crying small diamonds onto his shoulder."

The ending of "Army of Me"'s music video depicted Björk bombing an art museum, and due to a recent terrorist bombing in Oklahoma City, MTV removed it from its playlist before it even aired. However, within weeks it was broadcast, but cut off before the bomb goes off. There exists some version of the music video which censored the explosion of the bomb, and some showing "To Be Continued" at the end.

In 1995, the video was nominated for two MTV Video Music Awards, one for Best Special Effects in a Video and one for International Viewer's Choice Awards – MTV Europe, losing the former to "Love Is Strong" by The Rolling Stones and the latter to "Hold Me, Thrill Me, Kiss Me, Kill Me" by U2.

== Live performances ==
The song was performed in a few live shows. Björk premiered the song four days before the release of the single, on 20 April 1995, on Top of the Pops. She then performed the song again, on 4 May 1995, but with Skunk Anansie. This particular performance featured additional vocals by Skin. Björk performed the song live on Italian musical show Festivalbar and on The White Room, along with "I Miss You".

The song was performed on the Debut tour before the official release. The performance on the Post tour was called "explosive" by Adrien Begrand of PopMatters and was released on Live Box, in the Post Live CD, with the same performance being released on Björk's video Live at Shepherds Bush Empire. The song was performed on the Vespertine world tour, where it was accompanied by Zeena Parkins. The performance was called "extra-gritty" and the accompaniment of Parkins was described as giving the song "fresh urgency".

The song was performed on the Greatest Hits tour and on the Volta tour, with the latter performance being included on Voltaïc, both in the live version recorded at the Olympic Studios in London, and in the DVD Live in Paris.

The song was performed again in summer 2012 in Lollapalooza Chile as part of the Biophilia tour replacing most of the instrumental part with a Tesla coil.

== Covers ==
The song received a wide coverage from other artists. German metalcore band Caliban covered this song on their 2006 album The Undying Darkness. The female vocals on the chorus were recorded by Tanja Keilen. Belgian metal band Silent covered this song on their 2005 self-titled demo. The alternative metal/post-hardcore band Helmet recorded a cover of "Army of Me" which was released on a Music for Our Mother Ocean benefit compilation. The Australian metal band Many Machines on Nine covered "Army of Me" on their self-titled 2000 EP. A jazz cover was released by the Yaron Herman Trio on their album A Time for Everything in 2007. Abandoned Pools, an alternative rock band have also covered the song, which is available on The Reverb EP. Powerman 5000 released a cover of this song on their The Good, the Bad and the Ugly Vol. 1 compilation. Sin, a French industrial band, covered the song, available on Errare Digital Est, Recall 2003. Oliver Weers, a Danish rock vocalist made semi-famous by his participation in the Danish X Factor in 2008, released a heavy metal-style cover version of "Army of Me" in 2008 on an album entitled Get Ready. Australian alternative metal band Beanbag covered the song on their 2001 second album Welladjusted. English rock band Drama recorded a cover of the song to perform at the 2010 UK Live & Unsigned regional final in Manchester, 7 March. Polish progressive metal/post-metal band Proghma-C recorded a cover version on their debut album Bar-do Travel, 2009. French progressive metal band Klone also recorded a cover of the song as a bonus track on their 2010 album Black Days. Italian nu metal band Exilia recorded a cover of this song on their album Can't Break Me Down in 2005. Rapper Ryu sampled this song in the music video for his song "The One". Los Angeles-based rock band The Anix released a cover of the song on April 1, 2022 as a standalone single, which was later incorporated into their 2023 studio album Nightvision. American rock band In This Moment released a cover of the song as the fourth single from their eighth studio album, Godmode, on 20 September 2023.

In 2005, Björk opened a contest to choose from various remixes for the song, to release a compilation to help raise funds for charity. Over 600 remixes were submitted and Björk was helped in the choosing of the tracks by fellow writer and composer Graham Massey. The compilation, called Army of Me: Remixes and Covers was released in May 2005 and as of January 2006, the album had raised around £250,000 to help UNICEF's work in the south east Asian region.

== Track listings ==
- Australian and UK cassette single
1. "Army of Me" – 3:58
2. "Army of Me" (ABA All-Stars Mix) – 3:51
- UK CD single 1 and digital download 1
1. "Army of Me" – 3:57
2. "Cover Me"^{[A]} – 3:07
3. "You've Been Flirting Again"^{[B]} – 2:25
4. "Sweet Intuition" – 4:43
- UK CD single 2 and digital download 2
1. "Army of Me" (ABA All-Stars Mix) – 3:53
2. "Army of Me" (Masseymix) – 5:17
3. "Army of Me" (feat. Skunk Anansie) – 4:39
4. "Army of Me" (Instrumental ABA All-Stars Mix) – 3:49
- European CD single 1
1. "Army of Me" – 3:57
2. "Cover Me"^{[A]} – 3:06
- European CD single 2 and Japanese CD single
1. "Army of Me" – 3:58
2. "Army of Me" (ABA All-Stars Mix) – 3:46
3. "Army of Me" (Masseymix) – 5:12
4. "Army of Me" (feat. Skunk Anansie) – 4:33
5. "Army of Me" (Instrumental ABA All-Stars Mix) – 3:46

Notes

- ^{A} This is a different version than the one which appears on the album. It was recorded in a cave and is also known as "Cover Me" (Cave Version)
- ^{B} This is the Icelandic version of "You've Been Flirting Again".

== Credits and personnel ==
Credits are adapted from the Post album liner notes.

- Björk – vocals, songwriter, producer, keyboards
- Graham Massey – songwriter, producer, keyboards, programming
- Marius de Vries – keyboards, programming
- Nellee Hooper – producer
- Al Fisch – recording
- Mark Stent – mixer

== Charts ==
=== Weekly charts ===
Chart (1995)	Peak position
Australia (ARIA)	35
Belgium (Ultratop 50 Flanders)	13
Belgium (Ultratop 50 Wallonia)	17
Canada Top Singles (RPM)	59
Denmark (IFPI)	14
Europe (Eurochart Hot 100)	25
Europe (European Dance Radio)	12
Europe (European Hit Radio)	25
Finland (Suomen virallinen lista)	5
France (SNEP)	22
Germany (GfK)	55
Iceland (Íslenski Listinn Topp 40)	1
Israel (Israeli Singles Chart)	30
Netherlands (Dutch Top 40)	17
Netherlands (Single Top 100)	13
New Zealand (Recorded Music NZ)	26
Norway (VG-lista)	17
Scottish Singles Sales (Official Charts)	12
Sweden (Sverigetopplistan)	12
Switzerland (Schweizer Hitparade)	28
UK Singles (Official Charts)	10
UK Airplay (ERA)	64
UK Club Chart (Music Week)	44
US Alternative Airplay (Billboard)	21

=== Year-end charts ===
Chart (1995)	Position
Belgium (Ultratop 50 Wallonia)	81
Iceland (Íslenski Listinn Topp 40)	8
Netherlands (Dutch Top 40)	152

== Release history ==
Region	Date	Format(s)	Label(s)	Ref.
United Kingdom	24 April 1995	CD1; CD2; cassette	One Little Indian	
Australia	8 May 1995	Cassette	Mother; Polydor	
Japan	10 June 1995	CD	Mother	
