= I Remember You (Johnny Mercer and Victor Schertzinger song) =

1941 song

- Swedish release picture sleeve

Single by Frank Ifield
- B-side: "I Listen to My Heart"
- Released: June 29, 1962 (UK); July 1962 (US)
- Recorded: 1962
- Genre: Easy listening Folk
- Length: 2:03
- Label: VeeJay
- Composer: Victor Schertzinger
- Lyricist: Johnny Mercer
- Producer: Norrie Paramor

Official audio
- "I Remember You" on YouTube

"I Remember You"

Single by Björk
- A-side: "Venus as a Boy"; "Stígðu Mig"; "There's More to Life Than This"; "Anchor Song"; "Violently Happy"
- Released: August 23, 1993
- Genre: Art pop
- Length: 4:14
- Label: One Little Indian
- Composer: Victor Schertzinger
- Lyricist: Johnny Mercer
- Producer: Nellee Hooper

"I Remember You" is a popular song, published in 1941. The music was written by Victor Schertzinger, with lyrics by Johnny Mercer. The song was originally recorded by Jimmy Dorsey in 1941. It has since been covered by Frank Ifield, Glen Campbell, Björk, Alfredo Casero and others.

== History ==
"I Remember You" was one of several songs introduced in the film The Fleet's In (1942).

In 1941 Johnny Mercer's affair with Judy Garland ended when she married composer David Rose, driving Mercer to write I Remember You. Singer Mary Cleere Haran said that both Mercer's "Day In and Day Out" and "I Remember You" were directly inspired by Garland.

== Renditions ==
- Australian singer Frank Ifield recorded the song in a yodeling folk-music style on 27 May 1962, and his version went to number one on the UK Singles Chart, selling 1.1 million copies in the UK alone. The recording stayed at No.1 for seven weeks. It also reached number five on the U.S. Billboard Hot 100, number one on the U.S. Easy Listening chart, and number four for three weeks in Canada.
- Slim Whitman recorded the song in 1966, taking it to No. 49 on the Billboard Country Chart. In 1980, Whitman re-recorded the song, taking it to No. 44 and No. 57 in Canada. Whitman's 1966 recording was also featured in the 2003 film House of 1000 Corpses.
- Glen Campbell covered the song on his 1987 album Still Within the Sound of My Voice. His version peaked at number 32 on the Billboard Hot Country Singles chart in 1988 and number 56 in Canada.
- A recording of the song with new lyrics was used in a 1988 commercial for the Republican National Committee accompanying images of the 1979 oil crisis.
- Icelandic singer/composer Björk recorded an acoustic harp cover of I Remember You on the B-side of her 1993 single, "Venus as a Boy". In 1996, a stalker mailed a letter bomb loaded with sulphuric acid to Björk's London home, before filming his suicide while listening to her version.
- George Michael included a cover of the Björk arrangement on his 4th studio album, Songs from the Last Century, accompanied by harp and strings released in 1999. A version with a full orchestra was included on his live album, Symphonica.

== See also ==
- List of number-one adult contemporary singles of 1962 (U.S.)
