= Army of Me: Remixes and Covers =

2005 remix album by Björk

Remix album by Björk
- Released: 31 May 2005
- Label: One Little Indian

Björk chronology
Medúlla (2004)	Army of Me: Remixes and Covers (2005)	Drawing Restraint 9 (2005)

Professional ratings
Review scores
Source	Rating
Pitchfork	3.8/10
PopMatters	7/10
Stylus	D−

Army of Me: Remixes and Covers was released in May 2005. It is a collection of seventeen eclectic remixes of Björk's song "Army of Me" from Post, her 1995 album. Army of Me: Remixes and Covers was organised by Björk in response to a devastating Asian tsunami. Putting out a call on her website, Björk reached thousands of musicians around the globe, asking for a remix of "Army of Me" and stating that all the proceeds would go to the United Nations Children's Fund emergency work with children around the world. Björk received six hundred different remixes of the song before settling on the final twenty versions which made the album. It peaked at number fourteen on the dance albums chart in the UK and at number 168 in the France album charts.

As of January 2006, the album had raised around £250,000 to help UNICEF's work in the south east Asian region.

== Track listing ==
No.	Title	Performed by	Length
1.	"Army of Me"	Interzone	5:17
2.	"Army of Me"	Grisbi	3:00
3.	"Army of Djur" (Army of Animals)	50 Hertz; Häxor och Porr; Slagsmålsklubben	3:17
4.	"Army of Me"	The Messengers Of God	2:57
5.	"Army of Me"	Dr Syntax’N’CB Turbo v Rivethead	3:32
6.	"Army of Me"	Dr. Gunni	1:28
7.	"Army of Me" (Accordion Mix)	Martin White	1:28
8.	"Army of Me"	HEMP	3:08
9.	"Army of Me"	Lunamoth	5:42
10.	"Army of Me" (Bersarinplatz Mix)	Beats Beyond	4:43
11.	"Army of Me" (Baker Mix)	Peter Baker	0:54
12.	"Army of Me"	Random	4:08
13.	"Army of Me"	Atoi	4:31
14.	"Army of Me" (The Liquid Riot Mix)	R. Luvbeats	2:41
15.	"Army of Me" (Pink Battle Mash Up)	Alfredo Lietor	2:54
16.	"Army of Me" (Army Of Klaus Remix)	Patrick Wolf	3:48
17.	"Army of Me" (Undancing Remix)	Neetoo	3:43
18.	"A(r)mour"	Liliom	3:27
19.	"Once More" (In CoF Minor)	Mikhail Karikis	4:14
20.	"Army of Me"	Tor Bruce	4:05

== Charts ==
Chart (2005)	Peak position
France	168
