= Play Dead (song) =

1993 single by Björk and David Arnold

Single by Björk featuring David Arnold

from the album Music from the film The Young Americans and Debut (re-release edition)
- B-side: "End Titles/Play Dead"
- Released: 11 October 1993
- Studio: Whitfield Street Recording (London)
- Length: 3:56
- Label: Island
- Songwriters: Björk; David Arnold; Jah Wobble
- Producers: David Arnold; Danny Cannon; Tim Simenon

Björk singles chronology
"Venus as a Boy" (1993)	"Play Dead" (1993)	"Big Time Sensuality" (1993)

Music video
- "Play Dead" on YouTube

"Play Dead" is a song by Icelandic singer-songwriter Björk, released by the labels Island and Mother as the only single from the soundtrack of the 1993 crime drama The Young Americans, starring Harvey Keitel. The song was not included in the first edition of Björk's debut album, Debut (1993), but was later included as a bonus track, and the album was re-issued in November 1993. It was written by Jah Wobble, Björk, and David Arnold, produced by Cannon and Arnold, and received additional production and mixing by Tim Simenon.

"Play Dead", inspired by the main character of the film, was released on 11 October 1993 and charted within the top 20 in Denmark, Iceland, Ireland, the Netherlands, Norway, Sweden, and the United Kingdom. An accompanying music video was released, directed by Danny Cannon, featuring images from the film which also was directed by Cannon. "Play Dead" was included in Björk's 2002 greatest hits album Greatest Hits.

== Background and composition ==
"Play Dead"
In this part of the song, Björk reaches high notes on a base of lush strings.

"... I had written a song called 'Play Dead' for my very first film The Young Americans and I wrote that after seeing Tori Amos do a songwriter's showcase in London before she was well known. ... So I went home that night wanting to write a Tori Amos song, and I thumped out what became 'Play Dead'. "

— David Arnold on how Tori Amos inspired the track

The song was co-written by Jah Wobble, Björk featuring David Arnold. Björk was asked to write the melody and lyrics for the song, while Wobble wrote the bass part and Arnold composed the score, which Björk described as a "greatest hits of what's in the film".

Björk described the writing as "very difficult" because "the character in the film was suffering and going through hardcore tough times and at the time I was at my happiest". To help her in the writing, she asked the film's director, Danny Cannon, to write her a whole page of phrases that represented the emotions of the characters in the film, but she used only one line that Cannon wrote: "Sometimes, it's just like sinking", and still she changed it to "It's sometimes just like sleeping" in the actual lyrics.

The song is underscored by moody strings and its lyrics about acting numb to prevent emotional pain. Björk wrote it from the main character's point of view: "In the film, he had a girlfriend who just wanted him to be happy and in love and he just couldn't get his head around it. It was just me trying to imagine what he would say to her. Things he never actually said to her in the film but things he would have said to her".

Produced by David Arnold and Danny Cannon, the song was originally a non-album track recorded for the film The Young Americans and intended as a single-only release, but eventually it was added as a bonus track to international pressings of Björk's album Debut because Björk's manager Derek Birkett convinced her to add the track. Björk also sings on the tracks "Opening Titles" and "Leaving London" on the soundtrack CD of the film. In both the film and soundtrack, "Leaving London" crescendoes into "Play Dead" as a single arrangement. In both the album and the single version, the song is actually a remix by Tim Simenon. After the addition of "Play Dead" on Debut, about 100 people who already owned the album without the bonus track, called the record company and complained, demanding to be given new records as compensation.

The drums which the song is structured by are taken from the beginning of the 1977 song "Footsteps in the Dark" by The Isley Brothers, most famously used on Ice Cube's "It Was A Good Day", which was released earlier that year.

== Critical reception ==
The track was well received by music critics. Derek Birkett complimented it as "one of the best things Björk’s ever done". Alexis Petridis of Blender stated that it "boasts a chorus that’s both original and implausibly epic". In his weekly UK chart commentary, James Masterton wrote that it's "a haunting beautiful piece of music to rank alongside anything she ever did with the Sugarcubes and becoming a bigger hit than she ever had with her former band in the first place." Ian Gittins from Melody Maker named "Play Dead" Single of the Week, praising it as "a rare triumph. Björk's breathless, impossibly excited and intoxicated-by-life-vocal is transplanted into a rich, opulent setting where it thrives and flourishes." Pan-European magazine Music & Media noted that "the clamour of Iceland's siren is in the air again, beautifully floating above superb rhythm tracks. Highly original; there's nothing like this on the entire planet." Roger Morton from NME named it "Cracking Good Single of the Week", writing that "it's probably going to do more for Björk than anything she's so far released." He added, "Re-mixed by Tim Simenon from Bomb the Bass, and glittering with trad movie score grandeur, it's a swooping orchestral piece which dares her to go for the big performance." Tom Doyle from Smash Hits gave "Play Dead" four out of five, viewing it as "a grand sweeping groovy orchestral thing which sounds like an unhinged Bond theme and will make the hairs on the back of your neck tingle. Remarkable." The Tech journalist Fred Choi, while reviewing Greatest Hits stated that the song is "compelling but lesser-known". Mal Pearchey of Vox described it as "incredibly sophisticated after the eclectic drama of the Sugarcubes".

== Music video ==
Screenshot from the music video

The accompanying music video for "Play Dead" was directed by Danny Cannon, who also directed The Young Americans. In the video, Björk performs the song in an empty bar that is shown in the film. Her footage is intercut with scenes from the film that range from tenderness to violence. It was criticised because of its simplicity, with some pointing out it lacks the visual characteristics of other Björk videos. The video has been said to follow "the trends of MTV".

== Live performances ==
Björk performed the song in selected dates of her Debut tour, and usually sang it during her Homogenic tour, accompanied by a larger ensemble of strings. Björk's performance at the Union Chapel with the Brodsky Quartet was met with enthusiasm by The Guardian journalist Maddy Costa, that described the performance as a "Heavenly Experience" and, commenting the song's performance, stated that "reclaiming "Play Dead" from ad-land, the subdued volume and the Brodskys’ bristling tone brought out the fierceness of Björk's words". Björk also performed the song during her Vespertine world tour. The song has not been performed live since then.

== Track listings ==
- 7-inch and cassette single

A. "Play Dead" (Tim Simenon 7-inch remix) – 4:00
B. "Play Dead" (Tim Simenon orchestral mix) – 4:01

- European and Japanese CD single
1. "Play Dead" (Tim Simenon 7-inch remix) – 3:57
2. "Play Dead" (Tim Simenon orchestral mix) – 4:01
3. "Play Dead" (Tim Simenon 12-inch remix) – 5:26
4. "End Titles/Play Dead" (original film mix) – 3:52
- UK and Australian CD single
1. "Play Dead" (Tim Simenon 7-inch remix) – 3:57
2. "Play Dead" (Tim Simenon orchestral mix) – 4:01
3. "Play Dead" (Tim Simenon 12-inch remix) – 5:26
4. "Play Dead" (Tim Simenon instrumental) – 3:57
5. "End Titles/Play Dead" (original film mix) – 3:52

== Charts ==
=== Weekly charts ===
Chart (1993–1994)	Peak position
Australia (ARIA)	65
Belgium (Ultratop 50 Flanders)	33
Denmark (IFPI)	16
Europe (Eurochart Hot 100)	37
Finland (Suomen virallinen lista)	20
Germany (GfK)	41
Iceland (Íslenski Listinn Topp 40)	18
Ireland (IRMA)	18
Israel (Israeli Singles Chart)	25
Netherlands (Dutch Top 40)	10
Netherlands (Single Top 100)	11
Norway (VG-lista)	10
Sweden (Sverigetopplistan)	7
UK Singles (Official Charts)	12
UK Airplay (Music Week)	12

=== Year-end charts ===
Chart (1993)	Position
Sweden (Topplistan)	66

Chart (1994)	Position
Netherlands (Dutch Top 40)	132
Sweden (Topplistan)	84

== Release history ==
Region	Date	Format(s)	Label(s)	Ref.
United Kingdom	11 October 1993	7-inch vinyl; 12-inch vinyl; CD; cassette	Island	
Japan	20 December 1993	CD	Mother; Polydor	
Australia	17 January 1994	CD; cassette	Island	

== Covers ==
A cover of the song appears on the special edition of the album Into by the Finnish band the Rasmus. It is available on many of their singles as well, including "Madness". In 2007, The Swedish band Pain covered the song on the album Psalms of Extinction.

== Usage in media ==
A modified version of the song was also used in 1995 on the launch advert for the new Vauxhall Vectra, with the tagline "Designed for the next millennium".
