= Venus as a Boy =

1993 single by Björk

Single by Björk

from the album Debut
- B-side: "Stígðu Mig"; "I Remember You"; "There's More to Life Than This"; "Anchor Song"; "Violently Happy"
- Released: 23 August 1993
- Studio: Olympic (London); Beats (Mumbai)
- Genre: Ambient; chill-out; electronica
- Length: 4:42 (album and video version); 4:07 (edited LP version)
- Label: One Little Indian
- Songwriter: Björk
- Producer: Nellee Hooper

Björk singles chronology
"Human Behaviour" (1993)	"Venus as a Boy" (1993)	"Play Dead" (1993)

Music video
- "Venus as a Boy" on YouTube

"Venus as a Boy" is a song by Icelandic musician Björk, released as the second single from her 1993 album, Debut. The song was written by Björk and was produced by Nellee Hooper, who produced the majority of her debut album. The single was released in August 1993 by One Little Indian, a month after the release of the album. The song was inspired by a boy who saw everything from a "beauty point of view".

"Venus as a Boy" is an ambient and chill-out song that features a musical ensemble made up of Indian instruments like tablas. The song received mixed reviews from critics, who discussed Björk's musical shift. It became a chart-topping hit in Björk's native Iceland.

The accompanying music video was directed by the British music video director Sophie Muller. The clip shows Björk in a kitchen cooking eggs, and was inspired by the singer's favorite book Story of the Eye. Björk performed the song on different TV appearances, including Top of the Pops, and sang it during the course of her Debut tour.

The song was later chosen by fans to be included in her greatest hits album, Greatest Hits. It also appeared in her Family Tree Box Set; the set also contained a "greatest hits" disc on which the songs were chosen by Björk. In 2003, Q Magazine ranked "Venus as a Boy" at number 610 in their list of the "1001 Best Songs Ever".

== Background and inspiration ==
The song was written by Björk and was produced by Nellee Hooper. It was one of the last tracks to be recorded for the album. The song was inspired by a "specific person" but Björk never revealed who it was. Although, it is supposed that this specific person is Robert J (also known as RJ.) with whom Björk had a relationship at school years before the time of writing. Moreover, the song talks about a boy who saw everything from a "beauty point of view, and not superficial beauty but the beauty of brushing your teeth and the beauty of waking up in the morning in the right beat and the beauty of having a conversation with a person." as revealed by the singer.

The B-sides were "Stígðu Mig" ("Step Me"), a song originally recorded by The Elgar Sisters; a group formed in the early eighties by guitarist Guðlaugur Kristinn Óttarsson and Björk, written by Björk, Guðlaugur and Þór Eldon. The other B-side is "I Remember You", a cover of the classic love song written by Victor Schertzinger and Johnny Mercer, that was recorded together with "Like Someone in Love", but did not make the cut as the latter did. In both songs Corky Hale plays the Harp.

== Composition ==
"Venus as a Boy"
The chorus of the song, where Indian instruments can be heard.

"Venus as a Boy" has been described as an ambient and chill-out song. Its sound reflected Björk's newly found interest in Bollywood, having befriended people of Indian origin in London, most notably tabla player Talvin Singh, who would later collaborate on the track. She described the composition of the song in an interview with David Hemingway:

"I think I wrote it in my living room in Iceland and sang it into my dictaphone. Later, by accident, we were going through sounds and I found this broken bottle sound. It wasn't intentional but it sounded great. It was one of the last songs recorded for Debut — the album was ready to go. Sometimes the more unpredictable side of me does several headstands and flicks-flacks once the album has been delivered and the best song come[s] out."

Björk played keyboards in the song: "I don't use samplers much. I will usually gather soundbanks for each album and will then play them in on keyboards. This applies for simpler beats in songs like Venus as a Boy". She is also responsible for the bassline, in an interview where she described her collaboration with Timbaland she said: "He was a big fan of 'Venus as a Boy', the Bollywood strings and I remember him coming up to me at a party and saying he loved the bassline in that song and I felt pretty chuffed because I wrote that!"

Since Björk wanted the album to sound like an Indian soundtrack, many tracks including "One Day", "Come to Me" and the same "Venus as a Boy" features Indian instruments. The strings were recorded by a film studio orchestra in Bombay, thanks to Singh. The track heavily uses a vibraphone. The song also contains a sample from "Music for Shō" by Mayumi Miyata (1986).

== Critical reception ==
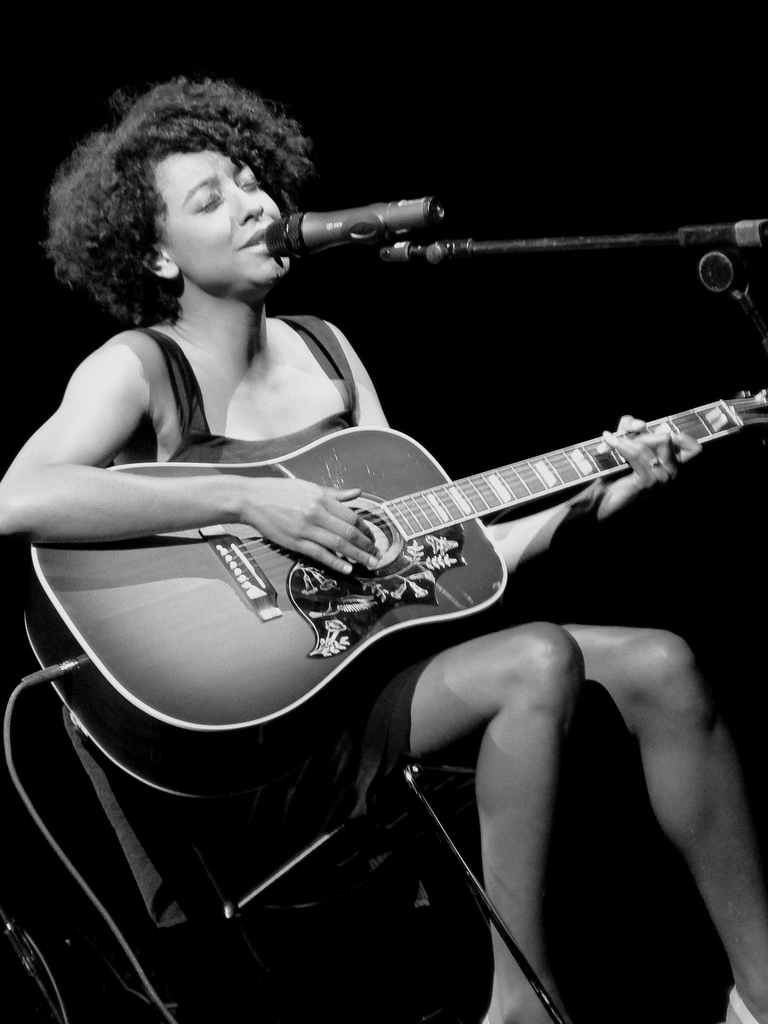
Corinne Bailey Rae covered the song in 2006.

"Venus as a Boy" received positive reviews from many music critics. Heather Phares of AllMusic complimented the song and its lyrics, stating that "the album's romantic moments may be its most striking; 'Venus as a Boy' fairly swoons with twinkly vibes and lush strings, and Björk's vocals and lyrics—"His wicked sense of humor/Suggests exciting sex"—are sweet and just the slightest bit naughty". Larry Flick from Billboard magazine described it as a "hip-hop-splashed tune—easily the most accessible cut from her adventurous solo debut." Taylor Parkes from Melody Maker named it Single of the Week, adding, "It's pornography, naturally. Naturally as in, you know, naturally." In December 1993, the magazine ranked it number five in their list of Singles of the Year. Johnny Cigarettes from NME also named "Venus as a Boy" Single of the Week, praising the "bizarrely gorgeous, head-spinningly eclectic and exotic instrumentation and arrangement", Bjork's "incredible voice, more startling and spine-stroking than it's been since 'Birthday' sent everyone into wibbling raptures", and her "beautifully peculiar way with a lyric". On the album review, another NME editor, Johnny Dee, felt the "wonderful" song "creates an Arabic mantra." Sam Wood from Philadelphia Inquirer named it one of the "high points" of the album, remarking that the song "marries a subtle reggae bassline with a deliciously sinuous string section reminiscent of classic Egyptian film scores". In June 1995, Boy George, while reviewing "Army of Me" for Select, said "Venus as a Boy" "is one of the greatest records in the history of man". Gavin Reeve from Smash Hits complimented it as a "gorgeous and uplifting song". He added, "Just one of the brilliant swirling dance tracks on her album Debut, this is surely the sort of music that God plays on his/her stereo."

A less flattering review came from Rolling Stone reviewer Tom Graves, who discussed the singer's shift from rock to alternative music, commenting that the Indian orchestra in "Come to Me" and "Venus as a Boy" "[is] more intrusive than galvanizing". On a similar note, Kate Narburgh of The Chronicle, citing the "Mellow vibes accent "Venus as a Boy"", hoped that "Björk won't waste her vocal talent on such talentless music".

The song was nominated in the "Song of the Year" category at the inaugural Icelandic Music Awards in 1993.

== Music video ==
Björk examining an egg.

=== Background ===
The accompanying music video for "Venus as a Boy" was directed by English director Sophie Muller and features Björk in a kitchen, fondling and cooking eggs. The usage of eggs was inspired by the singer's favorite book, Story of the Eye by Georges Bataille, a novella which deals with the bizarre sexual perversions of a pair of teenagers. At one point in the book, a girl, Simone, uses boiled eggs for sexual stimulation.

The story of the egg comes as Björk explains:

She [Sophie Muller] kept going on about it being fried. I was saying, 'No way is that book about a fried egg! I'm sorry. Poached? Okay. Boiled? Okay. Raw? Okay. But not fried.' [And a fried egg is unsuitable because......?] Because it's too hard. It's rough and it's greasy. It should be about being sort of liquidy and wet and soft and open...

She gave Muller a copy of Story of the Eye a couple of days before they filmed but did not insist that she read it. Muller did not have the time. After recording the video and then reading the book, Muller admitted to Björk that "Fried was the wrong egg!"

Much of the cutlery featured in the music video came from Björk's house.

=== Synopsis ===
The video opens with Björk, in an orange tee, in a kitchen, seemingly thoughtful. She leans on a table and while admiring an egg, she starts to sing. She turns on the fire and starts to fry some butter. As the second verse begins, the butter starts to burn so she takes it under the stream of the sink. She pours some oil in a pan and appears thoughtful again, after which she adds the eggs to the pan.

Various frames of the frying eggs and Björk playing with a spatula are shown; at one point the eggs appears burned, causing Björk's concern, but then they return unspoiled. During the gibberish part of the song, Björk grabs and gently caresses a bearded dragon. While she passes a hand on her forehead to wipe her sweat, she seems to perspire sparkles from her forehead, and then starts to emanate them from all over her body. The video ends as Björk takes her dish and goes away from the kitchen.

=== Reception ===
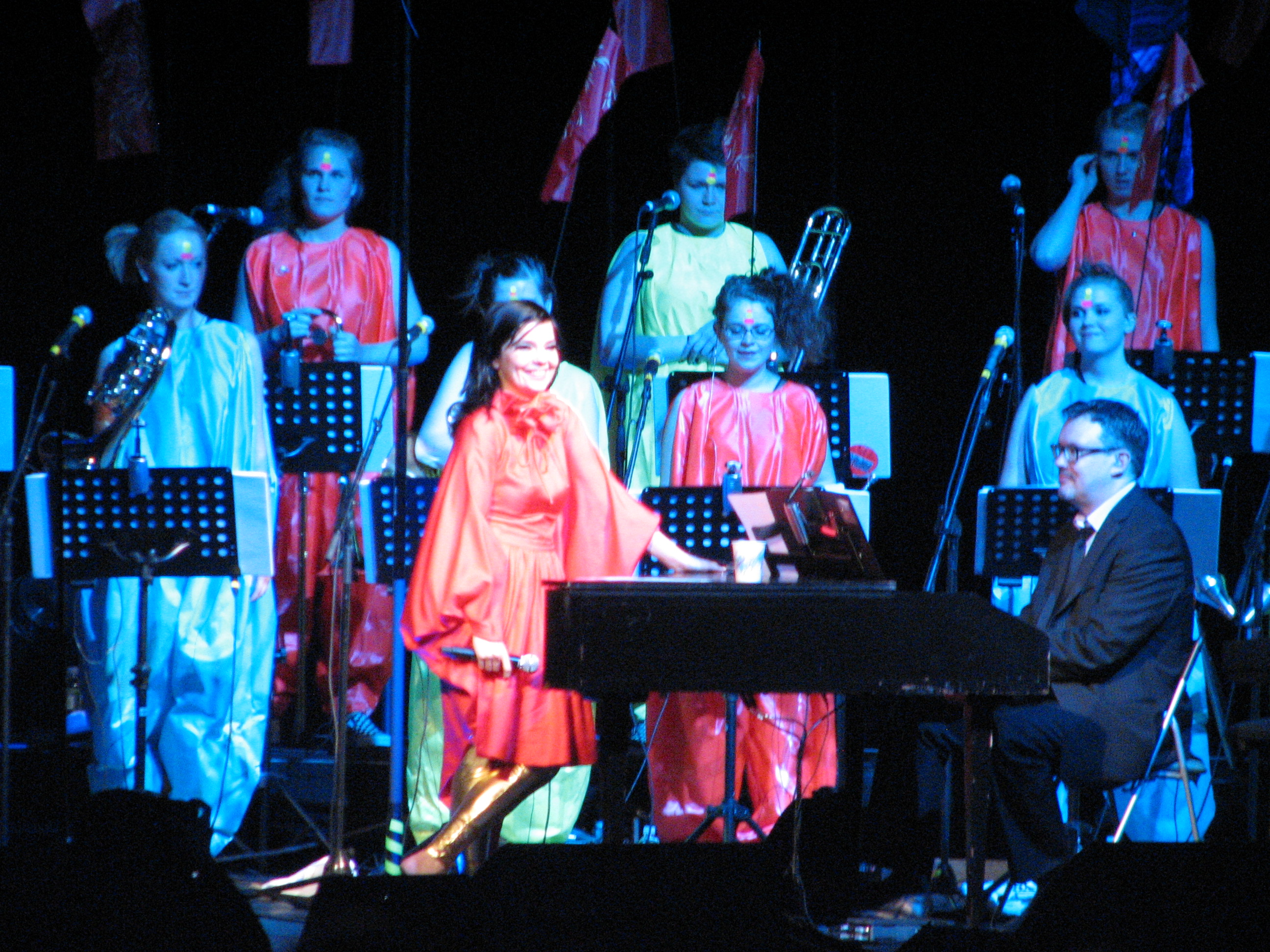
Björk performing "Venus as a Boy" at the Volta tour, with Harpsichord accompaniment by Jónas Sen.

The video was praised for its sensuality. Joe Clark, comparing the video with that of "Big Time Sensuality", stated that the video offers "bigger-time sensuality ("His wicked sense of humour suggests exciting sex"), though it's symbolized by the eggs and butter Björk uses to fix herself breakfast".

The "egg portion" of the video was parodied by comedic duo French and Saunders in a collaborative effort, featuring a spoof of the "It's Oh So Quiet" and "Big Time Sensuality" videos as well.

== Live performances ==
On 13 August 1993, Björk performed the song on the UK show The Beat, in one of her first TV appearances. She performed the song on Top of the Pops, on 120 Minutes along with "Come To Me" and on 3 From 1 with "Violently Happy".

Björk appeared on the fifth season of the British television show Later... with Jools Holland, singing "Hyperballad", "Possibly Maybe" and a version of the song accompanied by Guy Sigsworth on the Harpsichord. The performance was released on Björk's DVD Later with Jools Holland; this version was also included on Live Box. The song was part of her MTV Unplugged setlist.

The singer performed the song during all of her tours (excluding her Greatest Hits tour). During the Debut tour, she performed the song with Indian instruments. During the Post tour, the song's performance was enhanced with an accordion. Most recently, during her Volta tour and Biophilia tour, she performed the song with harpsichord accompaniment by Jónas Sen.

== Track listings ==
UK CD1
No.	Title	Length
1.	"Venus as a Boy" (Edit)	4:05
2.	"Venus as a Boy" (Mykaell Riley Mix)	4:51
3.	"There's More to Life Than This" (Non-Toilet Mix)	3:47
4.	"Violently Happy" (Domestic Mix)	5:17

UK CD2
No.	Title	Length
1.	"Venus as a Boy" (7" Dream Mix)	4:02
2.	"Stígðu Mig" (Björk, Guðlaugur Kristinn Óttarsson, Thór Eldon)	1:53
3.	"Anchor Song" (Black Dog Mix)	4:48
4.	"I Remember You" (Victor Schertzinger, Johnny Mercer)	4:13

US CD
No.	Title	Length
1.	"Venus as a Boy" (edited LP version)	4:03
2.	"Stígðu Mig" (Björk, Guðlaugur Kristinn Óttarsson, Thór Eldon)	1:53
3.	"Human Behaviour" (The Underworld Remix)	12:05
4.	"There's More to Life than This" (Non-Toilet Mix)	3:45
5.	"Venus as a Boy" (Anglo American Extension)	5:03
6.	"I Remember You" (Victor Schertzinger, Johnny Mercer)	4:13

== Charts ==
=== Weekly charts ===
Weekly chart performance for "Venus as a Boy"
Chart (1993–1994)	Peak position
Australia (ARIA)	92
Europe (Eurochart Hot 100)	92
Iceland (Íslenski Listinn Topp 40)	1
Sweden (Sverigetopplistan)	39
UK Singles (Official Charts)	29
UK Airplay (ERA)	41

=== Year-end charts ===
Year-end chart performance for "Venus as a Boy"
Chart (1993)	Position
Iceland (Íslenski Listinn Topp 40)	91

== Release history ==
Release dates and formats for "Venus as a Boy"
Region	Date	Format(s)	Label(s)	Ref.
United Kingdom	23 August 1993	7-inch vinyl; CD1; CD2; cassette	One Little Indian	
Australia	22 November 1993	CD	Mother; Polydor	
Japan	10 December 1993	CD	Mother; Polydor	

== Covers ==
The song was covered by Nils Landgren on 5000 Miles (1999); Sneaker Pimps (2004); Corinne Bailey Rae (2007) and as an instrumental by Australian jazz pianist Barney McAll, on his album Mother of Dreams and Secrets (2005), as well as American jazz pianist Geoff Keezer on his albums Zero One (2000) and Wildcrafted: Live at the Dakota (2005). A version in Japanese was recorded by Zoey (2003) and released as a single with accompanying music video. It was also covered by The Mike Flowers Pops (1996). On Andy McKee's album Gates of Gnomeria (2007), there is an instrumental version of the song, titled "Venus as a Girl". Other artists who have covered "Venus as a Boy" include Ásgerður Júníusdóttir, Serena Fortebraccio, Wildlife, E-Clypse, The Da Capo Players, Björkestra, Don Swanson, The Kate Peters Septet, The Violet Jive, Howl, Iris Ornig, Joo Kraus, Lars Duppler, Las Damas Y La Orquesta Invisible, Coparck, Workshy, Squid Inc., Realistic Orchestra, Sole Giménez, Sharon Sable, 2nd Backyard Junk, Camila Meza, and Kali Uchis.
