= The Young Americans (film) =

1993 British crime drama film by Danny Cannon

- DVD cover
- Directed by: Danny Cannon
- Written by: Danny Cannon; David Hilton
- Produced by: Alison Owen; Paul Trijbits
- Starring: Harvey Keitel; Iain Glen; John Wood; Terence Rigby; Keith Allen; Craig Kelly; Thandie Newton; Viggo Mortensen
- Cinematography: Vernon Layton
- Edited by: Alex Mackie
- Music by: David Arnold
- Production companies: PolyGram Filmed Entertainment; Working Title Films
- Distributed by: Rank Film Distributors
- Release date: 8 October 1993 (United Kingdom)
- Running time: 103 minutes
- Country: United Kingdom
- Language: English
- Budget: $3 million
- Box office: $3 million

The Young Americans is a 1993 crime drama film directed by Danny Cannon in his directorial debut.

== Premise ==
A DEA agent travels to London to apprehend a gangster who has formed a gang of sociopathic teenagers trying to imitate American culture.

== Cast ==
- Harvey Keitel as John Harris
- Iain Glen as Edward Foster
- John Wood as Richard Donnelly
- Terence Rigby as Sidney Callow
- Keith Allen as Jack Doyle
- Craig Kelly as Christian O'Neill
- Thandie Newton as Rachael Stevens
- Viggo Mortensen as Carl Frazer
- Geoffrey McGivern as Brian Carver
- Dave Duffy as Louis Carnegie
- John Forgeham as Detective Gray
- Anna Keaveney as Katie Arnold
- James Duggan as Dermot O'Neill

== Music ==
The music was composed by David Arnold. The film features Björk's song "Play Dead" and a remix of "Gave Up" by Nine Inch Nails.

== Reception ==
The film opened on 88 screens in the United Kingdom on October 8, 1993, and finished eighth for the weekend with a gross of £101,904. It went on to gross £240,576 in the UK and $3 million worldwide.
