= Drama (British band) =

Drama are an English four-piece rock band formed in Bolton, England in 2007. The band comprises vocalist, guitarist and keyboardist Ian Gordon, guitarist and backing vocalist Rob Heyes, bassist Rik Hindle and drummer Alan Taylor. The band are currently preparing to release their second EP - "Beneath the Veil" - featuring remastered songs recorded at Outhouse Studios in Reading with producer John Mitchell.

== History ==
=== 2007–10: Sex Love Lies ===
From the band's inception in the summer of 2007 through to the winter of 2008, founding members Gordon and Heyes wrote much of the material for what would eventually become Drama's first album, Sex Love Lies.

Sex Love Lies was released on 20 June 2009. Produced by Manchester-based producer, Paul Sadler, the album consists of 8 tracks, exploring sexual taboos and perversions, coupled with distinct, British humour. In his review of the album, Polish DJ and former Metal Hammer journalist Artur Chachlowski said, "You have to admit that this quite controversial unifying theme that runs throughout the record will draw the audience's attention." The album sleeve, designed by Bolton-based illustrator, Jen Collier, reflects this unifying theme.

In July 2009, Bruce Dickinson of Iron Maiden played the opening track from Sex Love Lies, Sky Falling, on his BBC Radio 6 show, Bruce Dickinson Friday Rock Show. Dickinson acknowledged the band's classic rock element when he said, "Sounds like something that Justin Hawkins would nod his head to and thoroughly approve of."

Miles Bartaby of the Classic Rock Society reviewed the album in the August/September 2009 edition of the Rock Society Magazine describing it as, "The finest debut I've heard in a while."

=== 2010–13: Drama EP and Curious Me ===
In October 2010, the band spent a week in London recording three tracks at The Animal Farm. Much of the week was filmed, resulting in the documentary, "Drama in London".

The band's first single of 2011, "ISO", was released on 14 March. The release was foreshadowed by a 2-month tour of the North West, billed the "Pay For ISO Mini-Tour". The tour commenced on 22 January 2011 at the Bakers Vaults in Stockport.

In his review of "ISO", Colin Jackson of Loud Horizon wrote, "It's one of those anthemic songs that will get right inside your head and have you metaphorically punching the air all day long." Jon Ashley of Manchester Music wrote, "ISO combines riffing, almost classic harmonious rock with the head charging power of some stadium bound alternative heavy melodics. This is a tight attack of thickly wedged guitars and intelligent guitar solos."

On 28 February 2011, the band announced that "ISO" would be appearing on Classic Rock Magazine's May Edition covermount CD.

The single's music video, directed by Ned Jackson, was "Video of the Day" on 21 April courtesy of Pure Rawk.

On 28 June 2011, the band announced that their self-titled EP was to be released on 12 August, and would be accompanied by a headline launch show at Manchester Academy 3. The EP consists of three tracks: Renée, Pretty Much and ISO, all of which were recorded at The Animal Farm in London during their October 2010 sessions.

In his review of the EP, Colin Jackson of Loud Horizon wrote of Renée, "It comes across as something between a stage production and a Freddie Mercury / Queen track, what with the dramatic little piano arpeggios in between the resounding guitars. Full marks for trying something different – if this is a one-off track, then that’s quite brilliant." Jon Ashley of Manchester Music wrote of Pretty Much, "“Pretty Much” offer(s) a consistency via infectious multi-layered guitars and Americanised metal pop – it’s a formula that can’t fail in the right hands and Drama certainly have the right number of fingers and thumbs."

In the early months of 2013, the band decided to relaunch under the guise 'Curious Me'. After some branding concerns and difficulties with several PR companies the band decided to revert to the band name 'Drama' and released a mini-album with the title of 'Curious Me' on 19 August 2013 via Bandcamp. The album was recorded over 10 days in February 2012 at Outhouse Studios in Reading with producer John Mitchell.

In October 2013, Classic Rock Magazine said of the album, "Alt. pop-rock, but blessed with a real sense of overview. It's 30 Seconds to Mars tunefulness meets Biffy Clyro vigour."

=== 2014–present: Beneath the Veil ===
Following an 18 month hiatus, the band announced they were preparing to release their second EP - "Beneath the Veil" - featuring remastered versions of songs recorded in February 2012 at Outhouse Studios with producer John Mitchell.

== Sound ==
Gordon and Heyes 'grew up on a diet of classic and progressive rock'.

The band's influences include Rush and Muse. Literary figures are also cited as influences, including H. P. Lovecraft, Edgar Allan Poe and Stephen King.

In numerous reviews, the band has been compared to a variety of artists, including Queen, Ozzy Osbourne, Led Zeppelin, Nickelback, 30 Seconds to Mars and Biffy Clyro.

== Band members ==
- Ian Gordon – vocals, guitar, keyboards
- Rob Heyes – guitar, backing vocals
- Rik Hindle – bass guitar
- Alan Taylor – drums

== Discography ==
- Sex Love Lies (2009)
- "ISO" (Single, 2011)
- Drama (EP, 2011)
- Curious Me (Mini-album, 2013)
