= Big Time Sensuality =

1993 single by Björk

Single by Björk

from the album Debut
- B-side: "Síðasta Ég"; "Glóra"; "Come to Me"
- Released: 22 November 1993
- Studio: Olympic (London, England)
- Genre: House; trance; dance-pop; jazz-funk
- Length: 3:56 (album version); 4:54 (video version); 5:46 (alternate "night version" video aka "The Fluke Moulimix")
- Label: One Little Indian
- Songwriters: Björk; Nellee Hooper
- Producer: Nellee Hooper

Björk singles chronology
"Play Dead" (1993)	"Big Time Sensuality" (1993)	"Violently Happy" (1994)

Music video
- "Big Time Sensuality" on YouTube

"Big Time Sensuality" is a song by Icelandic singer and songwriter Björk, released in November 1993 by the record label One Little Indian as the fourth single from the singer's debut album, Debut (1993). Written by Björk and frequent collaborator Nellee Hooper and produced by Hooper, "Big Time Sensuality" is a house-influenced song that helped boost Björk's popularity worldwide, particularly in the US, where she charted for the first time. In Iceland, it was a number-one hit. The lyrics deal with her relationship with her friends and Hooper. The song features house grooves and electronic bass sounds. Its accompanying music video, directed by French director Stéphane Sednaoui, featured Björk dancing on the back of a moving truck slowly driving through New York City. It received a nomination at the 1994 Billboard Music Video Awards.

== Background ==
"It's not erotic or sensual even if it may sound like that. As you know, you create pretty deep, full-on love relationships with friends. A lot of it is also about myself. I can be a coward a lot of the time and there comes a moment when I write a song when I get quite brave. It's a lot about me dealing with myself rather than attacking other people. Would I like to know the future? No. There's a side to me that likes to plan a little bit ahead and there's a side that just needs to be free. I've got problems with booking airline tickets – I always change them. Sometimes I wonder if it's just for me to feel free. To kind of not be nailed in is really important to me".

— Björk interviewed by David Hemingway.

After leaving the Sugarcubes, Björk traveled to London where she began exploring electronic music, which inspired her to change her musical style from the pop-rock sounds of the Sugarcubes to a more alternative and electronic style. "Big Time Sensuality" was one of the last songs to be written for Debut, and was originally planned to be the first single from the album, but it was delayed by the release of "Human Behaviour". It was then intended to be the third single, but was delayed again by the success of "Play Dead", and was finally released as the fourth single on 22 November 1993.

The song was co-written by Björk and Nellee Hooper and produced by Hooper, who assisted her with writing and producing her first two albums. Björk's meeting with Hooper inspired her to write the song: "I think it's quite rare, when you're obsessed with your job, as I am, when you met someone who's your other part jobwise and enables you to do what you completely want". The lyrics deal with the bravery of enjoying life to its fullest and were inspired by Björk's friendships:

I've got a lot of courage, but I've also got a lot of fear. You should allow yourself to be scared. It's one of the prime emotions. You might almost enjoy it, funny as it sounds, and find that you can get over it and deal with it. If you ignore these things, you miss so much.

== Remixes and B-sides ==
"Big Time Sensuality" received three different remixes from Fluke. One of them, called the "Fluke Minimix", was performed on different occasions and was used for a version of the song's music video. This edit was later released on Björk's Greatest Hits.

The single also contained "Glóra" ("Gloria") and "Síðasta Ég" ("The Last Me") as B-sides, two songs recorded by The Elgar Sisters, a group formed in the early 1980s by guitarist Guðlaugur Kristinn Óttarsson and Björk. "Glóra" is an instrumental track that features a flute solo played by Björk, who also wrote and produced the track. "Síðasta Ég" was written by Björk, Óttarsson and Þór Eldon Jónsson, a member of the Sugarcubes, and was produced by Björk and Óttarsson, with guitar played by Óttarsson.

== Composition ==
"Big Time Sensuality"
Björk sings the chorus on a base of pop beats.

"Big Time Sensuality – The Fluke Minimix"
The chorus of the song on the more House-oriented Remix.

The first two verses of "Big Time Sensuality" are underscored by upbeat keyboards that lead into electronica and techno-influenced grooves that Sandy Masuo of Option defined as "brooding". Björk belts out the first lines accompanied by a base of percussion, while the chorus features stronger electronic beats. After the first two verses, some of Björk's vocalizations resemble moans or shouts. Ben Thompson described this sequence as "sinuous pop-funk squawk". After the interlude "I don't know my future after this weekend/And I don't want to!" funk-like sounds lead the song to its end.

The "Fluke Minimix" is composed on a series of synthesizers and by slower vocals. The remix features electronic bass and makes extensive use of reverb. The track ends with the lines "It takes courage to enjoy it/The hardcore/And the gentle/Of Big Time Sensuality" whispered by Björk.

== Critical reception ==
The song was deemed a highlight of Debut and was praised by critics. Reviewing the album, Heather Phares of AllMusic, noted that "Björk's playful energy ignites the dance-pop-like 'Big Time Sensuality' and turns the genre on its head with 'There's More to Life Than This'." The website cites the track as an All Media Network-pick, and in a track review, Stacia Proefrock defined it as an "aggressive, screechy dance number" that "While not scraping the top of the charts[...] was part of an album unusual enough to stand out among its fellow pop releases as a quirky and complex experiment that worked most of the time". Larry Flick from Billboard magazine wrote, "Wiggly bass and heavy beat come to the fore here, unfortunately competing with Björk's voice for lead billing, when her vocal really should be allowed to steal the show." Sean McCarthy of the Daily Vault defined the track as "insanely addictive". John Hamilton from Idolator felt that "this dancefloor monster resembles the soulful American house sounds of Crystal Waters and Ultra Nate in its original album mix, but for the single, it was revamped into a storming trance jam by remix duo Fluke." Taylor Parkes from Melody Maker named it Single of the Week, writing that the new remixes "burn with precisely the kind of firework-faced madness that the best dance music achieves almost effortlessly, metallic thunder and cyclones of percussion, Björk's urgent, foot-stamping voice bobbing and weaving inside it all like a heat-seeking dolphin."

Martin Aston from Music Week gave it a score of four out of five, stating that it "sees the ubiquitous star this time going for the big dancefloor smash", adding that "she can do no wrong right now." Simon Reynolds of The New York Times stated that "the sultry 'Big Time Sensuality' has her vaulting from chesty growls to hyperventilating harmonies so piercing she sounds as if she's inhaled helium". Johnny Dee from NME commented, "More fun, madness and surprise follows", noting "the pulsating grind" of the song. Tim Jeffery from the Record Mirror Dance Update noted, "That soaring voice starts the track over swirling synths before a deep and rumbling bassline powers in and the rest is history repeated as Bjork heads for another smash." German band Culture Beat reviewed it for Smash Hits, giving it four out of five. Tania Evans said, "She really knows how to express herself as an artist and I like the irregularity of her phrasing and the way she uses her voice. She is unique." Jay Supreme added, "I love her, her voice is real good. This song comes from a different angle but you can tell that it's definitely her." Charles Aaron from Spin wrote, "As for the numerous Björk remixes, say yes to the totally over-hauled techno wig-outs, and no to the tasteful house rearrangements. Mainly because Nellee "Soul II Soul" Hopper's originals are so deftly evocative, and Björk's too-intimate-for-words voice—crooning, scatting, bellowing—needs no backseat driving. She won't take you to another world, just make this one seem way more limitless." Vox journalist Lucy O'Brien called it "saucy".

"Big Time Sensuality" was nominated in the Best Song category at the 1994 MTV Europe Music Awards, losing to "7 Seconds" by Youssou N'Dour and Neneh Cherry. In 1995, the song was awarded one of ASCAP's Rhythm & Soul Awards.

== Music video ==
=== Background and synopsis ===
"I had seen the Red Hot Chili Peppers video that he did, sort of black and white and silver, and I want to do a video to song called "Big Time Sensuality", and I was very aware that I want it to be quite different from "Human Behaviour", which is more sort of epic story-telling thing. "Big Time Sensuality" was more like a personal statement, it has to be very in-your-face. Then he called up, a little later, with something he thought was even better, basically to get a truck and drive up and down Manhattan as long as the light would last. I guess the idea to put someone on a truck, and kinda drive the truck, and you have to dance really intensely, and just the elements of danger at the top of that, do it in a city like New York. I think the policeman, very aggressive, asking us to try to stop to do it and we were kind [sic?] bit like, we were kinda like anarchists not stopping, the police were after us. Then, you get all those people who actually want to jump on the truck and take part like; "Are you doing a movie? Can I take part of it?" We had very big speakers and were blasting the song, everybody was kinda listening, and you know how New York people are, they're very sort of open anyway, they were clapping and dancing along, it was a bit of a performance statement. It was a great day, we had great laughs".

— Björk talks about the shooting of the music video.

To shoot the music video for "Big Time Sensuality", Björk called upon French director Stéphane Sednaoui, who had previously directed videos for Madonna, U2, and Red Hot Chili Peppers. Sednaoui heard about Björk when he went to Los Angeles for the first time and was fascinated by her music. Björk personally wanted the director after seeing some photos of Kurt Cobain shot by him that Björk recalled as being the only photos in which she saw Cobain "laughing out loud and dancing".

Sednaoui initially wanted to go to Iceland to shoot the music video, but the costs were too high for the budget. Björk explained the inspiration for the music video: "when you're living on the edge and it's about the courage to enjoy life". The director got the idea for the music video while he was in New York and realised that "it would work amazingly with the city. With all the big buildings and everything and her voice".

Björk at the back of a truck in the music video for "Big Time Sensuality". This scene was filmed at 59th Street and 3rd Avenue

The video for "Big Time Sensuality" was shot in black and white on 26 October 1993 and features Björk dancing on the back of a moving truck slowly driving through New York City in the middle of the day. Björk wears a white sweater and a long white skirt, with her hair in topknots. The video uses film effects such as slow motion and fast motion. Three versions of the video were released using different versions of the song. The first video version uses the album/single version of the song. The second version uses a remix by Fluke, an edit of the "Fluke Moulimix". The third version, shot in the evening, uses the full "Fluke Moulimix".

The video helped Björk become known in North America where it received heavy rotation on MTV channels, with many noting that the video was better known in the country than the song: "Few people know how the melody for "Big Time Sensuality" starts, but anyone who watched MTV in the early '90s could cheerfully belt out the single measure when she sings the words "Big Time Sensuality". The video was nominated for Best New Artist Clip of the Year in the Dance category at the 1994 Billboard Music Video Awards.

=== Usage in media ===
The video was later spoofed by British comedians French & Saunders, in a low-budget fashion (i.e., on a greenscreen), and also plays on the name of Iceland, Björk's home country, with the store of the same name. A brief scene from the video appears in the film Vanilla Sky (2001) in a vision sequence Tom Cruise has.

== Live performances ==
The song received a heavy promotion, and as such, Björk did numerous TV appearances. On 8 August 1993, she appeared on the UK show The Beat, performing the song along with "Venus as a Boy" and "Come to Me". Björk performed the song live on other British shows like Dance Energy, Top of the Pops and Smash Hits Poll Winners Party. She then performed the song live on The Tonight Show with Jay Leno, in one of her first appearance on the American broadcast. She performed the track on MTV's Most Wanted, where she performed also "Human Behaviour", and on The Grind. On a rare lip-synch performance, she sang the song on the Italian show Festivalbar. She also performed the song live, dressed in a big, red gown at the 1994 MTV Europe Music Awards, where she received two nominations. The song was part of her MTV Unplugged set list, where it received a different arrangement, accompanied by Indian instruments and a harpsichord. Its performance was released on Debut Live, which was included in Live Box.

"Big Time Sensuality" was a staple performance at her Debut tour and Post tour. Notably, its performance during the Post tour at the O2 Shepherd's Bush Empire in London was released on her VHS and DVD release Live at Shepherds Bush Empire, with the same performance released on Post Live, where it was given a "much more minimal treatment" accompanied by Leila Arab "gently hyperkinetic jungle beats".

== Accolades ==
Publication	Country	Accolade	Year	Rank
Toby Creswell	Australia	1001 Songs	2006	*
Panorama	Norway	The 30 Best Singles of the Year 1970–98	1999	23
NME	United Kingdom	NME Rock Years, Single of the Year 1963–99	2000	*
NME	United Kingdom	The 500 Greatest Songs of All Time	2014	322
Q	United Kingdom	The Ultimate Music Collection	2005	*
The Guardian	United Kingdom	1,000 Songs Everyone Must Hear	2009	*
Radio X	United Kingdom	The Top 1000 Songs of All Time	2010	*
Robert Dimery	United States	10,001 Songs You Must Hear	2010	*
Bruce Pollock	United States	The Rock Song Index: The 7500 Most Important Songs of the Rock and Roll Era: 1944-2000	2005	*
Spin	United States	The 100 Best Alternative Rock Songs of 1994	2014	69
WOXY.com	United States	Modern Rock 500 Songs of All Time	1989–2009	510
Slant Magazine	United States	The 100 Best Dance Songs of All Time	2020	82
Rolling Stone	United States	200 Greatest Dance Songs of All Time	2022	29
(*) designates lists that are unordered.	United States			

== Track listings ==
UK CD1
No.	Title	Length
1.	"Big Time Sensuality"	3:56
2.	"Síðasta Ég"	2:57
3.	"Glóra"	1:43
4.	"Come to Me" (Black Dog Mix)	5:02

UK CD2
No.	Title	Length
1.	"Big Time Sensuality" (The Fluke Minimix)	4:09
2.	"Big Time Sensuality" (Dom. T Big Time Club Mix)	6:09
3.	"Big Time Sensuality" (Justin Robertson – Lionrock Wigout Vox)	7:21
4.	"Big Time Sensuality" (Morales Def Radio Mix)	3:34
5.	"Big Time Sensuality" (The Fluke Magimix)	5:51
6.	"Big Time Sensuality" (Justin Robertson's Prankster's Joyride)	7:03
7.	"Big Time Sensuality" (The Fluke Moulimix)	5:43

== Charts ==
=== Weekly charts ===
Chart (1993–1994)	Peak position
Australia (ARIA)	62
Canada Top Singles (RPM)	90
Europe (Eurochart Hot 100)	38
Iceland (Íslenski Listinn Topp 40)	1
Israel (Israeli Singles Chart)	21
Netherlands (Dutch Top 40)	30
Netherlands (Single Top 100)	24
UK Singles (Official Charts)	17
UK Airplay (Music Week)	35
UK Club Chart (Music Week)	17
UK Dance (Music Week)	3
UK Indie (Music Week)	1
US Billboard Hot 100	88
US Alternative Airplay (Billboard)	5
US Dance Club Songs (Billboard)	1
US Dance Singles Sales (Billboard)	19
US Cash Box Top 100	78

=== Year-end charts ===
Chart (1994)	Position
Iceland (Íslenski Listinn Topp 40)	9
US Dance Club Play (Billboard)	28

== Release history ==
Region	Date	Format(s)	Label(s)	Ref.
United Kingdom	22 November 1993	12-inch vinyl; CD1; CD2; cassette	One Little Indian	
Australia	18 April 1994	CD; cassette	Mother; Polydor	
Japan	25 June 1994	CD	Mother	

== See also ==
- List of number-one dance singles of 1994 (U.S.)
