= Violently Happy =

1994 single by Björk

Single by Björk

from the album Debut
- B-side: "Come to Me"; "The Anchor Song"; "Human Behaviour"
- Released: 7 March 1994
- Genre: Techno; house; club music
- Length: 4:59; 3:30 (7-inch edit)
- Label: One Little Indian
- Songwriters: Björk; Nellee Hooper
- Producer: Nellee Hooper

Björk singles chronology
"Big Time Sensuality" (1993)	"Violently Happy" (1994)	"Army of Me" (1995)

Music video
- "Violently Happy" on YouTube

"Violently Happy" is a song by Icelandic singer-songwriter Björk, released in March 1994 through One Little Indian as the fifth and final single from her debut album, Debut (1993). The song was written by Björk and Nellee Hooper, who helped her in writing and producing most of the album. The lyrics speak of Björk feeling a love so intense that it is actually dangerous, requesting that her lover return to "calm her down". Musically, it is an upbeat song. "Violently Happy" peaked at number 13 on the UK Singles Chart and number four on the US Billboard Dance Club Play chart.

The song received positive reviews from music critics, who praised its musicality and its dance-pop appeal. The song received an accompanying music video which was shot by Jean-Baptiste Mondino, in which Björk and many guest appearances (including a then unknown Norman Reedus) dance frantically in a kind of asylum while they cut out their hair or parts of dolls. Björk performed the song live on TV a few times, including on Top of the Pops.

== Background ==
After leaving The Sugarcubes, Björk traveled to London where she began having contacts with electronic music, and that inspired her to change her musical style from the pop-rock sounds of the Sugarcubes to a more alternative and electronic style of music. "Violently Happy" was released as the last single from Debut and demonstrates this musical shift. Björk explained:

"Violently Happy" is about when you’re a junkie on exchanging emotion, not at one but at the level 200. That thing. And then the person goes away and you really miss someone. When you’re with that person you’re really peaceful because you get what you need back and you both give everything you need to give. And that person goes away and all that exchange is not there so you get your kicks elsewhere, you end up running on rooftops in blizzards, drinking 97 tequilas just to feel. You know what I mean. So it starts off really happy then the longer the person’s away from you, it starts getting self-destructive.

Björk further said that the song was inspired by her living in Reykjavík and being far away from her lover: "For me, it's quite a brave thing. It's like putting your diary out for everyone to read. Of course, I didn't put everything in, I very carefully edited it. I'm very good with scissors". The lyrics are autobiographical as Björk stated: "It's just the same as if you go out with a mate and get drunk and get to the 'truth' stage and you wake up next day and think 'fuck, what did I say?'. Sometimes you feel fine, sometimes you feel embarrassed, sometimes you feel a friend has told you something they shouldn't have. I think our instincts know when you've given too much".

== Composition ==
"Violently Happy"
In this 30 second sample of the song, techno beats are opposed to Björk's melancholic vocals.

"Violently Happy" is an upbeat track influenced by techno. Its genres range from dance to synth-pop. The song begins with a nearly a cappella section, in which Björk sings the line "Since I met you/this small town/hasn't got room", underscored only by ambient sounds. When Björk continue the verse "For my/big feelings" percussion starts to play and lead into a house influenced score. The song is dominated by techno grooves mixed with percussions and drums. After Björk finishes the second refrain, a funk-rock oriented interlude starts, juxtaposed with repeating Björk vocals.

Portions of the melody are influenced by, if not directly lifted from, Björk's earlier composition "I'm Hungry" from The Sugarcubes' album Stick Around for Joy.

== Critical reception ==
"Violently Happy" received generally positive reviews from music critics. It was defined "bittersweet" by Heather Phares of AllMusic, and "insanely addictive" by Sean McCarthy of The Daily Vault, which also deemed its title as "one of the best song titles of all time". The Daily Telegraph's journalist Emily Bearn noticed that "Violently Happy" finds her making guttural noises at the sea: "I tip-toe down to the shore/Stand by the ocean/Make it roar at me/And I roar back". Brantley Bardin of Details commented that "songs like “Violently Happy” summed up a worldview that put all its faith in emotional abandon instead of logic. “Too much cleverness,” says Björk, “is the worst disease in the world. It ruins everything. Give us a laugh—make us happy". Brad Beatnik from Music Week's RM Dance Update named it Tune of the Week on 26 February 1994, writing, "A typical fourth single, this might not be quite as immediate as her previous hits but it still has some damn fine moments."

In particular, Simon Reynolds of The New York Times praised the song generally, "The title of 'Violently Happy' captures the Björk effect perfectly: a gush and rush of euphoria, a tidal wave of oceanic feeling. Over the song's brisk house beats, Björk stammers as she struggles to express feelings of excitement so intense she seems on the brink of leaping out of her skin: 'I'm driving my car too fast with ecstatic music on/I'm daring people to jump off roofs with me.' In the end, she and Mr. Hooper resort to studio wizardry to gesture at inexpressible feelings, sampling one syllable and turning it into a stuttering vocal tic". Johnny Dee from NME commented, "More fun, madness and surprise follows", noting its "pulsating grind". Andrew Perry from Select found that it "verge on garage". Sylvia Patterson from Smash Hits gave it a score of four out of five, writing, "Not quite the jovial rejoicings of "Big Time Sensuality" but a giant of space-dance majesty, nonetheless." Troy J. Augusto from Variety described it as "a smoothly twisted tune". David Petrilla from The Weekender stated that the singer "is aiming directly at the dance floor" with the song. In 2019, Defected Records featured the Basso Hitto Dubbo remix of "Violently Happy" in their list of "17 Best Remixes Ever".

== Music video ==
In a scene of the music video, Björk removes the innards from a teddy bear

=== Background ===
The accompanying music video for "Violently Happy" was directed by French fashion photographer and music video director Jean-Baptiste Mondino. To shoot it, Björk flew to Los Angeles in January 1994 and she found herself involved in the 1994 Northridge earthquake, and as such the shooting was postponed until the next day. Nettie Walker, Björk co-manager, recalled the event and described Björk's peculiar behavior: "When she did the video for "Violently Happy" in LA, she was there in the middle of the earthquake. She described it like, a huge rumbling, deep in your stomach, which is exactly Björk, that she found it a brilliant rather than frightening experience. Everyone was trying to get hold of her to see if she was OK, but she had gone to the video shoot, dead on time, ready to start. That’s how Björk is, committed to doing something... She’s into this magpie mentality." and this was further confirmed by Mondino, who added: "She said she was so happy to have experienced the earthquake, and on top of that she didn’t have her son with her so she was freer to experience it without fear... For me she is an iceberg, we only see a little tip of it".

=== Synopsis ===
The video starts with a man, seemingly with white hair, shaking his head frantically in a padded room of a mental institute, where the entire video takes place. Björk appears in a white dress resembling an open straitjacket with pieces of hair surrounding her. Various scenes are intermingled: a girl seems to have cut down the hair of a doll to resemble hers, while various models look into the camera, some with scissors, others with dolls.

As the chorus starts, a patient begins to cut his hair with an electric razor, and Björk herself appears to cut her hair with scissors. Sounds of snipping of scissors are overlaid on the track. During one scene, Björk carries a teddy bear; while the video continues and the patients dance and caress their dolls or cut their hair, Björk disembowels the bear, removing all the foam rubber from it. The patients keep on dancing and acting emotionally throughout the room, and the white hair of the patient from the first scene is revealed to be shaving soap as he shaves his head with a razor. The video ends with a patient pulling a string from a doll, which garbledly pronounces "I'm the baby". This sound sample and all of this doll's samples are from the Disney show Dinosaurs.

=== Reception ===
The video received lukewarm reviews from critics. Charles Taylor of Salon.com stated that "Jean-Baptiste Mondino’s "Violently Happy", is what most people mean when they talk about how bad videos can be, as cold and pretentious and humorless as the worst fashion photography".

MTV found the video a bit too violent so when they showed the video it received a formal warning from the Independent Television Commission. It won an award in the category for Pop at the 1994 Music Video Production Awards in Los Angeles.

== Live performances ==
Björk performed the song in a few TV appearances. On 12 February 1994, she performed the song in the French show Nulle Part Ailleurs, and on 17 March 1994, she performed "Violently Happy" on Top of the Pops. She further performed it on MTV show 3 From 1, along "Venus as a Boy". The song was part of Björk's MTV Unplugged performance, which was released on her DVD MTV Unplugged / Live and on Debut Live, included in Live Box

The song was performed during her first three tours. The performance during the Debut tour was released on Vessel, where she wears a dress similar to the one wore in the music video. The performance of the song during the Post tour, where "Violently Happy" was usually the encore was heavily praised by critics. Nick Coleman of The Independent stated that during "Violently Happy" "Björk formed a stubby pencil shape and bounced herself silly". During its review of Björk's performance at The Academy, MTV Online complimented the singer's energy and wrote that "during "Violently Happy", I thought maybe someone might have snuck something into the coffee I had before the show", on a similar note, Barry Walters of The San Francisco Examiner stated that "a relatively low-key track like "Violently Happy" was turned into the evening’s pounding peak".

Its performance during the Homogenic tour was praised by James Sullivan of the San Francisco Chronicle, who wrote that "As the string section sat motionless during the dance track "Violently Happy", Björk raced back and forth in bare feet to the syncopated thump. She’s an irrepressible dust devil, a former child star who knows how to command attention."

== Track listings ==
CD1
No.	Title	Length
1.	"Violently Happy" (7-inch edit)	3:30
2.	"Anchor Song" (acoustic version)	3:20
3.	"Come to Me" (acoustic version)	5:22
4.	"Human Behaviour" (acoustic version)	3:00

CD2
No.	Title	Length
1.	"Violently Happy" (Fluke – Even Tempered)	4:33
2.	"Violently Happy" (Massey Mix – Long)	6:08
3.	"Violently Happy" (Masters at Work 12-inch)	6:03
4.	"Violently Happy" (12-inch vocal)	4:53
5.	"Violently Happy" (Fluke – Well Tempered)	5:45
6.	"Violently Happy" (Massey – Other Mix)	7:30
7.	"Violently Happy" (Vox dub)	4:39

== Charts ==
=== Weekly charts ===
Chart (1994)	Peak position
Australia (ARIA)	94
Europe (Eurochart Hot 100)	29
Europe (European Dance Radio)	12
France (SNEP)	31
Germany (Media Control)	100
Israel (Israeli Singles Chart)	23
Scottish Singles Sales (Official Charts)	15
UK Singles (Official Charts)	13
UK Airplay (Music Week)	34
UK Dance (Music Week)	10
UK Club Chart (Music Week)	24
UK Indie (Music Week)	1
US Dance Club Play (Billboard)	4

=== Year-end charts ===
Chart (1994)	Position
UK Singles (OCC)	187

== Release history ==
Region	Date	Format(s)	Label(s)	Ref.
United Kingdom	7 March 1994	12-inch vinyl; CD1; CD2; cassette	One Little Indian	
Japan	30 April 1994	CD	Mother	
Australia	27 June 1994	CD	Mother; Polydor	
