= Nellee Hooper =

British composer and record producer (born 1963)

- Born: Paul Andrew Hooper; 15 March 1963 (age 63); Bristol, England
- Genres: Electronic; trip hop; R&B; rock; house
- Formerly of: Maximum Joy; the Wild Bunch; Soul II Soul

Paul Andrew "Nellee" Hooper (born 15 March 1963) is a British record producer, remixer and songwriter known for his work with many major recording artists beginning in the late 1980s. He also debuted as a motion picture music composer with Scottish composer Craig Armstrong and Marius de Vries for the soundtrack for Baz Luhrmann's Romeo + Juliet in 1996.

Hooper has produced seven Grammy Award-winning recordings for artists including Smashing Pumpkins, U2, Soul II Soul, and Sinéad O'Connor. He has been awarded Q's Best Producer award and twice been Music Week Producer of the Year.

== Biography ==
Born in Bristol, Hooper began his career in 1982 as a percussionist and backing vocalist with Bristol punk funk post-punk band Maximum Joy. He later became a DJ as a member of the Wild Bunch, the Bristol-based sound system and group that became Massive Attack.

Between 1989 and 1992, he produced albums for Soul II Soul (Club Classics Vol. I), Sinéad O'Connor (I Do Not Want What I Haven't Got), and Björk's first outing (Debut), which in 1995 Mixmag magazine ranked the 31st and 3rd best dance albums of all time, as well as Massive Attack's second album (Protection).

The 1995 BRIT Awards honoured Hooper as Best Producer for his work on Massive Attack's Protection, Björk's Post and Madonna's Bedtime Stories albums.

In 1998, he won a BAFTA Award (Anthony Asquith Award for Film Music) for his work arranging the score and soundtrack for Baz Luhrmann's Romeo + Juliet.

In the late 1990s, Hooper set up the Meanwhile... label, which is a subsidiary of Virgin Records.

Hooper continued to work steadily into the 2000s. He received a Grammy nomination in 2003 for his work on No Doubt's Rock Steady and Lamya's Learning from Falling albums. His other work has included producing the singles "GoldenEye" (1995) for Tina Turner, "Under the Bridge" (1998) for All Saints and "Down Boy" (2002) for Holly Valance as well as providing remixes for artists like Janet Jackson and Sade.

He has worked with Gwen Stefani on her solo albums and on U2's 2004 release How to Dismantle an Atomic Bomb, for which he won a Grammy Award. He also produced the debut solo album of Andrea Corr of the Corrs, titled Ten Feet High, released on 25 June 2007.

Hooper produced the full-length debut album for Disney actress/singer Emily Osment, Fight or Flight in 2010.

In 2011, Hooper produced Paloma Faith's Fall to Grace, nominated for two Brit Awards for Best Female and Album of the Year.

== Awards ==
=== Grammy winners ===
Soul II Soul (1989)
Soul II Soul's 1989 album Club Classics Vol. One (known as Keep on Movin’ in the US), produced by Hooper, was awarded two Grammys: "Back to Life" won Best R&B Performance by a Duo or Group with Vocals and "African Dance" won Best R&B Instrumental Song.

Sinead O'Connor (1991)
Sinéad O'Connor took the Best Alternative Music Performance Grammy for her album I Do Not Want What I Haven't Got.

Smashing Pumpkins (1997)
The single "The End Is the Beginning Is the End" won the Best Hard Rock Performance award at the 1997 Grammys.

U2 (2006)
How to Dismantle an Atomic Bomb won Album of the Year at the 2006 Grammys. The single "Sometimes You Can't Make It on Your Own" won two awards; Best Rock Performance by a Duo or Group with Vocals and Song of the Year.

== Romeo + Juliet score ==
Hooper was responsible for the BAFTA award-winning soundtrack to Baz Luhrmann's Romeo + Juliet in 1996. He worked with Scottish composer Craig Armstrong and English composer Marius van Wyk de Vries. It was Hooper's first and only motion picture score. Hooper armed the soundtrack with sequences of bombastic choral and flamboyant orchestral forces, and fused it with his well-known hip hop, electronic and trip hop genres. Hooper since has not been active in the motion picture industry.

== Technology ==
In 2021, Hooper joined Throne, a venture capital firm, as an advisor alongside Gee Roberson, the former chairman of Geffen Records, and manager of Kanye West.

== Selected production credits ==
- "I Got You Babe" (Cher with Beavis and Butt-Head)
- "Shame on You" (Andrea Corr)
- "I Need Your Lovin'" (12" extended remix) (Alyson Williams)
- "#1 Crush" (Nellee Hooper Remix) (Garbage)
- "Down Boy" (Holly Valance)
- "Under the Bridge" (All Saints)
- "Got 'til It's Gone" (Nellee Hooper Master Mix) (Janet Jackson feat. Q-Tip and Joni Mitchell)
- "Ordinary Girl" (LOLENE)
- Fall to Grace (Paloma Faith)
- "Where Are You Now" (Nellee Hooper Mix) (Janet Jackson)
- "Feel No Pain" (Nellee Hooper Remix) (Sade)
- "Young Hearts Run Free" (Kym Mazelle)
- "GoldenEye" (Tina Turner)
- "6 Underground" (Nellee Hooper Edit) (Sneaker Pimps)
- "Gabriel" (Nellee Hooper Mix) (Lamb)
- "I Do Not Want What I Haven't Got" (Sinéad O'Connor)
- Björk
  - "It's Oh So Quiet"
  - "Big Time Sensuality"
  - "Hyperballad"
  - "Venus as a Boy"
  - "Violently Happy"
  - "Isobel"
  - "Human Behaviour"
  - "Army of Me"
  - "Sweet Sweet Intuition" – It's Oh So Quiet b-side
- Gwen Stefani
  - "Wonderful Life"
  - "Early Winter"
  - "What You Waiting For?"
  - "Luxurious"
  - "The Real Thing"
  - "Danger Zone"
- The Smashing Pumpkins
  - "The End Is the Beginning Is the End"
  - "The Beginning Is the End Is the Beginning"
  - "Perfect" (Nellee Hooper Mix)
- No Doubt
  - "Hella Good"
  - "It's My Life"
  - "Running"
- Lamya
  - "Black Mona Lisa"
  - "Empires"
- Madonna
  - "Bedtime Story"
  - "I Want You" feat. Massive Attack
  - "Sanctuary"
  - "Inside of Me"
  - "Survival"
  - "Forbidden Love"
- Soul II Soul
  - "Keep on Movin'"
  - "Back to Life"
  - "Get a Life"
- U2
  - "Sometimes You Can't Make It on Your Own"
  - "Hold Me, Thrill Me, Kiss Me, Kill Me"
  - "If God Will Send His Angels"
- Emily Osment
  - Fight or Flight
