= Human Behaviour =

1993 single by Björk

Single by Björk

from the album Debut
- B-side: "Atlantic"
- Released: 7 June 1993
- Genre: House; dance-pop; experimental pop
- Length: 4:12
- Label: One Little Indian
- Songwriters: Nellee Hooper; Björk
- Producer: Nellee Hooper

Björk singles chronology
"Ooops" (1991)	"Human Behaviour" (1993)	"Venus as a Boy" (1993)

Isobel song cycle singles chronology
"Human Behaviour" (1993)	"Isobel" (1995)

Music video
- "Human Behaviour" on YouTube

"Human Behaviour" is a song by Icelandic recording artist Björk, released on 7 June 1993 by One Little Indian as the lead single from her debut studio album, Debut (1993). Produced by Björk's longtime collaborator Nellee Hooper, it reflects upon human nature and emotion from an animal's point of view. The song and video were inspired by British broadcaster and naturalist David Attenborough.

Critics praised "Human Behaviour" and called it a highlight of Debut. The song was an underground smash that peaked at number two on the US dance charts and reached number 36 on the UK Singles Chart. Its music video was directed by Michel Gondry, produced by Midi Minuit, and is the first time he and Björk collaborated. The video, like the song, is a story about the relation between humans and animals from the animal's point of view.

== Background and inspiration ==
"After The Sugarcubes, I guess I had a mixture of liberation and fear. It had been obvious for a while in the band that I had different tastes than the rest. That's fair enough - there's no such thing as correct taste. I wrote the melody for "Human Behaviour" as a kid. A lot of the melodies on Debut I wrote as a teenager and put aside because I was in punk bands and they weren't punk. The lyric is almost like a child's point of view and the video that I did with Michel Gondry was based on childhood memories."

— Björk talking to David Hemingway about the song.

"Human Behaviour" was written by Nellee Hooper and Björk, and was produced by Hooper. The song was first written in 1988 when Björk was still the leading singer of the Sugarcubes; however, she decided not to release it with the band. "Human Behaviour" is a house song with a four-on-the-floor style, characteristic of the music in Debut. It features a "bouncing riff" sampled from Antônio Carlos Jobim, with "its syncopated beat consigned to a venerable orchestral instrument, the timpani."

The song was inspired by David Attenborough documentaries and by the relation between humans and animals. Björk explained to Rolling Stone, talking about the inspiration for the song: "'Human Behaviour' is an animal's point of view on humans. And the animals are definitely supposed to win in the end." On a recent question and answer session with fans on The Guardian website, Björk revealed more information about the writing of the song: "I wrote it I was referring to my childhood and probably talking about how I felt more comfortable on my own walking outside singing and stuff than hanging out with humans..." The song was also inspired by the riff from Ray Brown Orchestra's "Go Down Dying".

This is the first song on the "Isobel song cycle", a transcendental cycle in Björk's discography which goes from "Human Behaviour" to "Wanderlust" (2007). The B-side contained in the cassette edition of the single is the reggae-influenced "Atlantic", which was produced and written by Björk. Its lyrics talks about Björk's family: "My son has eight grandmothers and eight grandfathers and it's about the love and the complications of that".

"Human Behaviour"
A 30 second sample of the song, which features different instruments.

== Critical reception ==
The song was well received by music critics. In a retrospective review, Terry Nelson from Albumism said it is "brilliant", noting it as "a smart and quirky observation of us very strange humans as seen through the eyes of an animal." For AllMusic's Heather Pares, the song's "dramatic percussion provides a perfect showcase for her wide-ranging voice". Upon the single release, Larry Flick from Billboard magazine wrote that it "has her ripping that harsh and distinctive voice over a stark, militaristic dance beat. Alternative programmers surely will be captivated by the mystical combo of what eventually become mantra-like vocals and an insinuating bassline." Dave Sholin from the Gavin Report stated that here, Björk "gets off to an awesome start", adding that "it's time to introduce her to Top 40 audiences, who can't help but be blown away by the lyrical power and originality of this fresh entry." Caroline Sullivan from The Guardian said, "Its combination of smoky, jazz-club vibe and a sound that's often more a laryngeal reflex than a voice is addictively strange. In a year of female experimentalism, Bjork is out there on her own, and sounds just fine." In his weekly UK chart commentary, James Masterton felt it's "unfortunately a cacophonous mess".

Dave Simpson from Melody Maker named it Single of the Week, writing, "This is wonderful, the sort of spooky and unique experience I thought pop had abandoned long ago. [...] Mostly, though, it's The Voice that gives 'Human Behaviour' its near-intangible sparkle. I can't remember the last time I heard a voice so laden with intrigue (sexual tension, outrage, fear—they're all in there) or an avant-garde record that made such sense as pop." In their review of Debut, Music & Media commented, "This solo album succesfully [sic] marries eccentricity to accesibility [sic]. The musical-esque song 'Like Someone In Love' and the current single 'Human Behaviour' with those thundering timpani are prime examples of this." Martin Aston from Music Week gave it a score of four out of five, calling it a "sensual, subtle dance track that bodes well for the future." Simon Reynolds from the New York Times described the lyrics as a "parallel between the beastliness of humanity and the bestiality of nature. Johnny Dee from NME noted that "a swampy kettle drum jazz vibe circles around Bjork's rasping larynx, trying to find a melody but eventually settling for the search." Tom Graves from Rolling Stone wrote, "Only on the opening track, 'Human Behavior', do we get a glimmer of what the fuss was all about." Andrew Perry from Select said, "The Gang Starr-style swingin' jazz loop of 'Human Behaviour' asserts a gameplan of searching for landscapes in which to set Björk's familiar tonsillar acrobatics." Siân Pattenden from Smash Hits gave it two out of five.

== Music video ==
"When we did our first video, for "Human Behaviour", I was thinking: "Great, we're going to Iceland and we're going to shoot a lot of great landscape." And [Björk] said no - she had a similar idea as my friend Etienne in Oui Oui; she wanted to use animals to reflect human nature. And it was great, because as soon as she started to throw some ideas, they started to bounce in my mind and imagination and I immediately came back with other ideas, and we did a video that was very collaborative. "

— Michel Gondry talking about the inspiration for the music video.

The accompanying music video for "Human Behaviour" was directed by French director Michel Gondry, and this was the first time he and Björk collaborated. Björk talked about the video in an interview with Rolling Stone:

"'Human Behaviour' is an animal's point of view on humans. And the animals are definitely supposed to win in the end. So why, one might ask, is the conquering bear presented as a man-made toy? I don't know. I guess I just didn't think it would be fair to force an animal to act in a video. I mean, that would be an extension of what I'm against. I told [Gondry], 'I want a bear and textures like handmade wood and leaves and earth, and I want it to seem like animation.' Then I backed out."

The video is a loose take on the children's tale "Goldilocks and the Three Bears", with visuals inspired by Yuri Norstein's animated film Hedgehog in the Fog. The video has several elements that are present in Gondry's first feature film Human Nature (2001).

=== Synopsis ===
Björk singing while she's in the stomach of the "bear"

As the video starts, a car approaches a hedgehog while the animal tries to cross a country road. The video's style is a surreal, almost Papier-mâché style with a combination of practical effects and forced perspective shifts. Images of a toy bear approaching a human hunter in a threatening way are shown. As Björk starts to sing, she appears in a small cabin while sitting at a table, seemingly eating. Meanwhile, in the forest, the hedgehog manages to not get hit by the car and approaches the hunter, who is now lying on the ground.

As Björk continues to sing, she appears walking in the forest, seemingly followed by the bear. A frame shows a nest full of Björk-like humans trapped in a pupa. When the bear and the singer meet, the animal makes the motion of roaring at her. She starts to fly through the forest, and during the flight she clings to a tree. The tree collapses, she falls down near the hunter still lying supine on the ground, and she appears on the ground having the same dimensions as the hedgehog. Then, the situation of the opening frames is repeated, as Björk tries to cross the road and manages to not get hit by the car, driven by the bear. In the following scenes, she sings in a river in the middle of the forest. While she contemplates the sky, the Moon appears to emanate pulsations, and the perspective shifts to what appears to be a moth. Now on the Moon, the singer is shown dressed as an astronaut and plants a Soviet flag.

Björk appears to fall down from the Moon, and seemingly falls down in the bear's throat; however, she keeps singing even in the animal's stomach. During the breakdown, she dances in her hut tapping and looking at a bulb, while a moth falls down on her plate. Scenes of the bear attacking and dragging the hunter are shown. As the video fades out, the singer continues singing in the stomach of the bear.

=== Reception ===
The video was well received by music critics, who complimented its originality. Critics praised also the chemistry between Gondry and Björk: "The imagery of 'Human Behaviour' is a web of various physical, in-camera effects that Gondry uses throughout his film career. Models, composites, screen projections (all featured in image eight), and lighting (see image two) abound in Björk's emotional woodlands. Colors are deep and saturated. In addition to his unique perceptions of Björk's music, Gondry's art of storytelling are unique to the music video world. 'Human Behaviour' is a story of predator and prey. In search of food, a bear clomps through a forest in the evening. A rugged hunter stalks the woods in pursuit of his game. Björk, as narrator and character(s) of her own story, flees from the bear. Numerous times the bear almost succeeds: in one attempt he drives a car, and almost hits Björk. In the end, Björk flies down the throat of the bear, and rests in his stomach. The hunter also meets his demise. The video is a classic; a vivid story rendered in Gondry and Björk's surreal playground."

In 1993, Rolling Stone included the music video in their "The Top 100 Music Video of all Time" list, at number 96. The video received six nominations for the MTV Video Music Awards of 1994 including Best Female Video, Best New Artist in a Video, Breakthrough Video, Best Direction, Best Special Effects and Best Art Direction, winning none. The video was also nominated for a Grammy Award for Best Music Video, Short Form losing to Peter Gabriel's "Steam". In 2009, the video was nominated for another MTV Video Music Awards in the Best Video (That Should Have Won a Moonman) category, losing to "Sabotage", by the Beastie Boys.

== Impact ==
- The song was parodied on the PBS show Bill Nye the Science Guy as "Cross Pollination," with lyrics concerning plants. Although the original vocal melody was not used, the music is unmistakably an attempt to spoof the backing of "Human Behaviour".
- The music video was riffed by Beavis and Butt-head in the episode "Closing Time."
- It was used in the 10th episode of the second season of Gilmore Girls. The song can be heard when the Gilmore girls see the perfect snowman has been destroyed after "The Bracebridge Dinner". It has been included in the series' soundtrack Our Little Corner of the World: Music from Gilmore Girls (2002).

== Live performances ==
Björk promoted the song by a series of TV appearances. She performed the song and "Big Time Sensuality" on MTV's Most Wanted while dressed in a pink skirt and yellow tee, accompanied by a Hammond Organ and Tablas. On 13 October 1993 she performed a set of three songs, including "Come to Me" and "The Anchor Song" on Planeta Rock. The song was part of her MTV Unplugged setlist, and was performed with a harpsichord solely. She also performed the song and was also interviewed on an October 1993 episode of the then-new talk show Late Night with Conan O’Brien. At the 1994 Roskilde Festival, Björk joined Underworld on stage to perform the Underworld remix of the song.

Björk performed the song in all of her tour. During the Vespertine world tour, the song featured a more electronic arrangement accompanied by a more classical Orchestra. During the Volta tour, the song was performed only once and featured a brass arrangement. She performed a new flute arrangement of the song during the Utopia tour.

== Track listings ==
UK cassette
No.	Title	Length
1.	"Human Behaviour"	4:12
2.	"Atlantic"	2:00

UK CD
No.	Title	Length
1.	"Human Behaviour" (album version)	4:12
2.	"Human Behaviour" (Close to Human mix by Speedy J)	6:22
3.	"Human Behaviour" (Underworld mix)	12:03
4.	"Human Behaviour" (Dom T. mix)	6:58
5.	"Human Behaviour" (Bassheads edit)	6:33

== Charts ==
=== Weekly charts ===
Weekly chart performance for "Human Behaviour"
Chart (1993)	Peak position
Australia (ARIA)	63
Iceland (Íslenski Listinn Topp 40)	1
Israel (Israeli Singles Chart)	22
Netherlands (Dutch Top 40)	33
Netherlands (Single Top 100)	35
Sweden (Sverigetopplistan)	29
UK Singles (Official Charts)	36
UK Airplay (ERA)	54
UK Dance (Music Week)	20
UK Club Chart (Music Week)	34
UK Indie (Music Week)	1
US Bubbling Under Hot 100 (Billboard)	9
US Alternative Airplay (Billboard)	2
US Dance Club Songs (Billboard)	2

=== Year-end charts ===
Year-end chart performance for "Human Behaviour"
Chart (1993)	Position
Iceland (Íslenski Listinn Topp 40)	15
US Dance Club Play (Billboard)	16
US Modern Rock Tracks (Billboard)	19

== Release history ==
Release dates and formats for "Human Behaviour"
Region	Date	Format(s)	Label(s)	Ref.
United Kingdom	7 June 1993	12-inch vinyl; CD; cassette	One Little Indian	
Australia	30 August 1993	CD	Polydor	
Japan	26 September 1993	CD	Mother	
