= Enjoyed: A Tribute to Björk's Post =

Compilation album by various artists
- Released: 2008

Enjoyed: A Tribute to Björk's Post, sometimes referred to as Stereogum Presents... Enjoyed: A Tribute to Björk's Post, is a tribute album by various artists, released by Stereogum in 2008. The compilation album contains cover versions of all eleven tracks from Björk's album Post, originally released in 1995, plus an alternate take of "It's Oh So Quiet".

== Composition ==
The compilation contains covers of all eleven tracks from Björk's album Post, originally released in 1995, plus an alternate version of "It's Oh So Quiet".

== Track listing ==
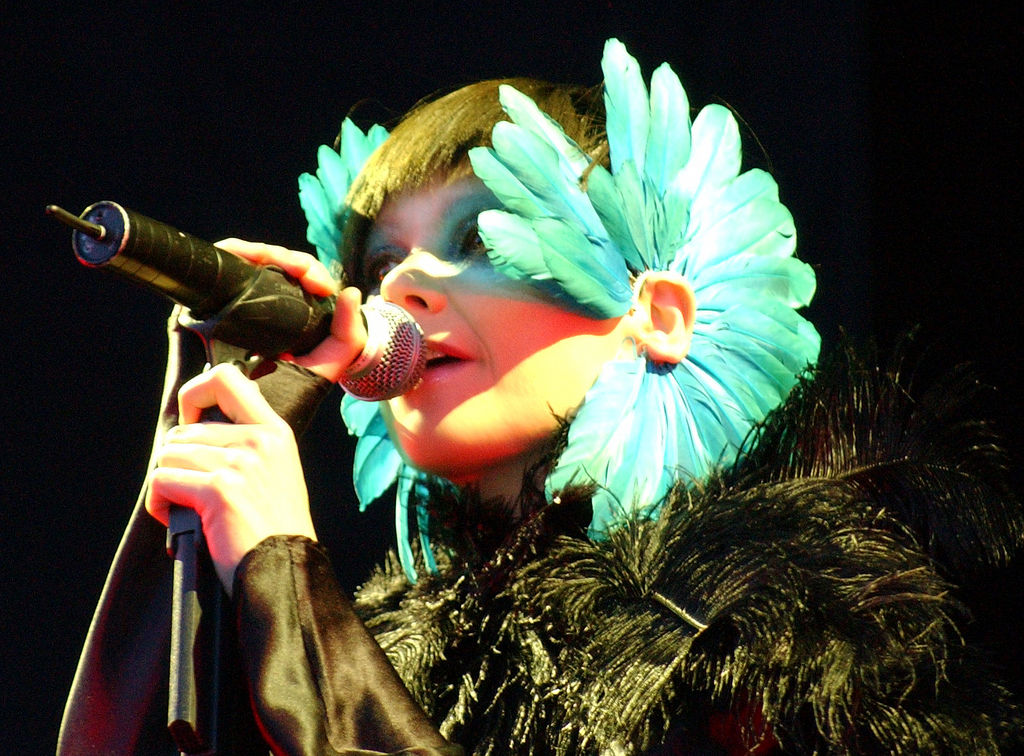
Björk performing in 2003

1. "Army of Me" (Björk, Graham Massey), performed by Liars
2. "Hyperballad" (Björk), performed by Dirty Projectors
3. "Modern Things" (Björk, Massey), performed by High Places
4. "It's Oh So Quiet" (Hans Lang, Bert Reisfeld), performed by Bell
5. "Enjoy" (Björk, Tricky), performed by Pattern Is Movement
6. "You've Been Flirting Again" (Björk), performed by Evangelicals
7. "Isobel" (Björk, Marius de Vries, Nellee Hooper), performed by Xiu Xiu
8. "Possibly Maybe" (Björk), performed by Final Fantasy and Ed Droste
9. "I Miss You" (Björk, Howie Bernstein), performed by White Hinterland
10. "Cover Me" (Björk), performed by El Guincho
11. "Headphones" (Björk, Tricky), performed by Atlas Sound
12. "It's Oh So Quiet [Alternate Take]" (Lang, Reisfeld), performed by No Age

Track listing adapted from AllMusic and Stereogum.
