= Rodney P =

English MC and radio and television personality

Rodney Panton, also known as Rodney P (born in Balham, London, 12 December 1969) is an English MC, as well as a radio and television personality who first gained attention via the UK hip hop scene in the 1980s. A former member of UK hip-hop group London Posse, Rodney P is known for rapping in his London accent.

== Career ==
=== Music ===
In 1986, London Posse were invited by Mick Jones of the Clash to support his new band Big Audio Dynamite on a UK tour. A recording contract with Big Life Records followed, and the recording of the songs "Live Like the Other Half" and "Money Mad", which appeared on the group's only album, Gangsta Chronicle. Gangsta Chronicle was voted the most important UK hip-hop album of all time in the 2007 poll of music magazine Hip Hop Connection.

After London Posse came to an end, Rodney P launched his own label, Riddim Killa, a collaboration with Low Life Records, on which he released a series of singles including "Big Tings" and the "Riddim Killa". In 2003, he released the solo album The Future and in 2007 he released Klashnekoff's debut album.

Rodney P signed to Tru Thoughts Records in 2011. A collaborative album with Zed Bias and Falacy was released in 2012 under the name Sleepin Giantz.

Rodney P has also collaborated with Skinnyman, Blak Twang, Dub Pistols, Roots Manuva and the Nextmen, and featured on recordings by Omar, Terri Walker, the Brand New Heavies, MJ Cole, Roni Size, the Stanton Warriors, Timo Maas, Björk and L’Entourloop.

=== Radio ===
Shortly after setting up Riddim Killa Records in 2002, Rodney P and DJ Skitz were invited by the BBC to host "The Original Fever", a groundbreaking urban music show on the then newly formed digital station BBC Radio 1Xtra. He was introduced to DJ Skitz by mutual friend Destiny and appears on Skitz's albums Countryman and Homegrown Volume 1. Their show "The Original Fever" ran for over 6 years and saw Rodney & Skitz interviewing some of the biggest names in music including Pharrell Williams, P Diddy, 50 Cent and Kanye West. This development in his career and a love of the medium led to even more involvement in radio documentaries. He has since gone on to present topical documentaries including the Sony Award-nominated F.E.D.S, Concrete Heat and the Lamacq Live documentary, The Beautiful Struggle, which saw him returning to war-torn Sierra Leone, after first visiting in 1993 as part of London Posse, to report on the burgeoning indigenous hip hop culture.

=== TV and film ===
Rodney P has often been asked to contribute to televised discussions, sharing his knowledge and opinion on many topics; this has led to numerous appearances on television shows like Trevor Nelson's The Low Down, Don Letts' 2007 3-part soul music anthology Soul Britannia and The Mercury Prize Award Ceremony. He has also appeared in many TV documentaries including How Hip Hop Changed the World hosted by Idris Elba and Life of Rhyme hosted by Akala. Rodney received exposure on Channel 4's Dub Plate Drama featuring alongside UK artists such as Shystie, Ms Dynamite and N Dubs and Big Nasty in the world's first viewer-led interactive television drama. In 2016, Rodney P presented The Hip Hop World News, a 90-minute authored film by Acme Films for BBC Four in which Rodney set out to show what the world looks like through the lens of hip hop interviewing hip hop artists like Russell Simmons, Rakim and Chuck D of Public Enemy.

In 2017, he presented The Last Pirates – Britain's Rebel DJs also for BBC Four which celebrated the pirate radio boom in London during the 1980s.

In 2020, Rodney P presented Rodney P's Jazz Funk on BBC Four, a one-hour exploration of the jazz-funk movement, one of the first black British music cultures.

=== Live ===
Rodney P has toured with the Dub Pistols and DJ Skitz. Rodney has also performed at festivals across the UK including Bestival, The Secret Garden and Glastonbury. He has also hosted the MF Prince's Trust Concert with Jay-Z and Alicia Keys and the United Nations-sponsored UNHabitat Charity Concert alongside Jazzy Jeff, Dead Prez and Mos Def.

== Personal life ==
In November 2020, Rodney P admitted that he had assaulted an ex-girlfriend and it was also revealed that he served 15 weeks in prison after attacking another woman in 2012.

== Discography ==
=== Albums ===
- The Future (2xLP, TP) (2002)
- The Future (CD) (2004)

=== Singles and EPs ===
- "Tings in Time" (12") 1997
- "Big Tings We Inna" (12") 2001
- "Murderer Style / Friction" 2001
- "Riddim Killa / A Love Song" (12") 2002
- "I Don't Care" (12") 2004
- "Trouble" (12", single) 2004
- "Trouble (MJ Cole Remix)" (12") 2004
- "Trouble (Roni Size Remix)" (12") 2004
- "The Nice Up" (12") 2005
- "Devon Cream" (12", mp3) 2007
- "I'll Try" (12") 2009
- "Live Up" (mp3) (feat. Peoples Army and Mighty Moe) 2011
- "Success" (7") 2013
- "Holes in the Building" (DJ Die, Indigo Kid) 2016
- "The Next Chapter / Recognise Me (I'm an African)" 2019
- "Nice and Easy" (Bassnectar) 2020

=== Collaborations/guest appearances ===
- Dobie - Dobie E.P. inc. "Luv 'N' Hate (Can Never Be Friends)" w/ Rodney P, 12", 1995
- Bjork - Telegram inc. "I Miss You" (Dobie remix featuring Rodney P), 1996
- Björk - I Miss You inc. "I Miss You" (Dobie remix featuring Rodney P); February 10, 1997
- Revolutionary / Dedication 12" 1999 (Skitz & Rodney P)
- Skitz featuring Rodney P - The Killing (12", Single) 2001
- "We Stay Rough" on Mark B and Blade - The Unknown 2001
- Skitz - Countryman 2001 (3 tracks)
- Plus One - Champion Sounds 2002
- Nextmen - Get Over It 2003 (2 tracks)
- Nextmen - "Firewalking" (12"/12" remixes) 2003
- Freq Nasty - Come Let Me Know (12", Promo) 2003
- United State - All My Love (Goes Your Way) (12") 2004
- United State - All My Love (Goes Your Way) (Drum 'n' bass remixes) (CDr, Promo, Single) 2004
- "Big Black Boots" on Skitz - Homegrown, Vol. 1 2004
- Benjamin Zephaniah and Rodney P - Naked & Mixed Up (12", CD) 2006
- Dub Pistols (featuring Rodney P) - Peaches (7"/12"/CDr) 2007
- Dub Pistols - Speakers and Tweeters 2007 (3 tracks)
- Dub Pistols - Rum & Coke 2009 (4 tracks)
- Flore (featuring Rodney P & Shunda K) - We Rewind / The Test 2009
- Flore - Raw 2010 (2 tracks)
- Dub Pistols - Worshipping the Dollar 2012 (3 tracks)
- Sleepin' Giantz - Sleepin' Giantz, LP, 2012
- Team Dynamite - featuring Bailey Wiley & Rodney P - Its Not All About You, 2016
- L'Entourloop - Forgotten Skank featuring Rodney P, Le Savoir Faire, 2017
- The Herbaliser - Like Shaft (featuring Rodney P & 28luchi), Bring Out The Sound, BBE, 2018
- The Herbaliser - Some Things (featuring Rodney P & Tiece), Bring Out The Sound, BBE, 2018
- Ocean Wisdom - 'Righteous' (with Rodney P and Roots Manuva), Wizville, 2018
- Kingdem (Rodney P, Blak Twang, Ty) - The Kingdem, EP, 2019
- Bassnectar - Nice & Easy (featuring Rodney P), All Colors, 2020
