= Telegram (album) =

Remix album by Björk
- Released: 25 November 1996
- Genre: Techno; electronic dance; post-rock
- Length: 47:13
- Label: One Little Indian
- Producer: Björk; Nellee Hooper; Tricky; Howie B; Eumir Deodato

Björk chronology
Post (1995)	Telegram (1996)	Homogenic (1997)

Telegram is the first full-length and second overall remix album by Icelandic musician Björk, released on 25 November 1996. The album is a collection of remixes of several tracks from her album Post, which had all previously appeared as B-sides of the UK versions of the singles off Post, except the "Enjoy" remix which was previously unreleased. The cover was shot by Japanese photographer Nobuyoshi Araki. All of the songs on Post were remixed, excluding "The Modern Things" and "It's Oh So Quiet". The collection also included one new song entitled "My Spine" which was originally slated to appear on Post but was pushed out by "Enjoy", becoming the B-side to the UK "It's Oh So Quiet" single instead. The album has sold 228,000 copies in the US according to SoundScan.

== Content ==
For me Telegram is really Post as well but all the elements of the songs are just exaggerated. It's like the core of Post. That's why it's funny to call it a remix album, it's like the opposite. Telegram is more stark, naked. Not trying to make it pretty or peaceable for the ear. Just a record I would buy myself. Like a letter to myself. Sort of... "fuck what people think". It's a truth thing.

— Björk in an interview with Blah Blah Blah in 1996.

The track listing was originally going to contain Talvin Singh's "Calcutta Cyber Cafe" mix of "Possibly Maybe" and Plaid's remix of "Big Time Sensuality". The Japanese version does not include the original version of "I Miss You".

The original UK LP pressing contains an alternate third track, the "Further Over the Edge Mix" of "Hyperballad" as opposed to the more commonly heard "Further Over the Edge Mix" of "Enjoy". The remixes are nearly identical with the major difference being the chopped up vocals come from "Hyperballad" for the "Hyperballad" version and from "Enjoy" on the "Enjoy" version. To date the "Hyperballad (Further Over the Edge Mix)" is exclusive to the original UK vinyl pressing while the original CD pressing and all subsequent CD and vinyl pressings contain the more common "Enjoy" version.

Björk also declared that the release of Telegram meant the end of an era consisting of Debut and Post.

== Reception ==
Professional ratings
Review scores
Source	Rating
AllMusic	4/5 stars
The A.V. Club	mixed
The Guardian	4/5 stars
Los Angeles Times	2.5/4 stars
Pitchfork	7.9/10
The Rolling Stone Album Guide	4/5 stars
Rolling Stone	3/5 stars
Select	1/5 stars
Spin	3/5 stars
USA Today	3/4 stars

The compilation was well received by music critics. Stephen Thomas Erlewine of AllMusic wrote, "Telegram works as an excellent introduction to techno for alternative pop fans unsure of where to begin exploring." According to CMJ New Music Monthly, musically the album contains "a real and surprising taste for recent trends in dance music". Douglas Wolk of CMJ New Music Monthly felt the music of Telegram was "actually better than Post", describing the tracks as "well-considered reworkings". The Rolling Stone Album Guide gave the album three and a half stars, and stated it "shed new light on the songs".

== Track listing ==
No.	Title	Writer(s)	Length
1.	"Possibly Maybe" (Lucy Mix)	Björk	3:02
2.	"Hyperballad" (Brodsky Quartet Version)	Björk	4:20
3.	"Enjoy" (Further Over the Edge Mix)	Björk; Tricky	4:19
4.	"My Spine"	Björk; Evelyn Glennie	2:33
5.	"I Miss You" (Dobie Rub Part One – Sunshine Mix)	Björk; Howie B	5:33
6.	"Isobel" (Deodato Mix)	Björk; Marius de Vries; Nellee Hooper; Sjón	6:09
7.	"You've Been Flirting Again" (Flirt Is a Promise Mix)	Björk	3:20
8.	"Cover Me" (Dillinja Mix)	Björk	6:21
9.	"Army of Me" (Masseymix)	Björk; Graham Massey	5:15
10.	"Headphones" (Ø Remix^{[A]})	Björk; Tricky	6:21

Initial UK vinyl pressing alternate track
No.	Title	Writer(s)	Length
3.	"Hyperballad" (Further Over the Edge Mix^{[B]})	Björk	4:20

US edition bonus track
No.	Title	Writer(s)	Length
11.	"I Miss You" (album version)	Björk; Howie B	3:59

Notes

- ^{A} Headphones" (Ø Remix) is also known as "Headphones" (Mika Vainio's 0Mix) or "Headphones" (The Mëtri Mix)
- ^{B} The record mislabels the song as "Enjoy" (Further Over the Edge Mix)

== Charts ==
Chart (1997)	Peak position
UK Albums (OCC)	59
US Billboard 200	66

== Release history ==
Region	Date
United Kingdom	25 November 1996
United States	14 January 1997
