= Post (Björk album) =

Studio album by Björk
- Released: 12 June 1995
- Recorded: Late 1994 – April 1995
- Genres: Art pop; avant-pop; experimental pop
- Length: 46:04
- Labels: One Little Indian; Elektra; Mother; Polydor
- Producers: Björk; Nellee Hooper; Graham Massey; Tricky; Howie B

Björk chronology
The Best Mixes from the Album-Debut for All the People Who Don't Buy White-Labels (1994)	Post (1995)	Telegram (1996)

Singles from Post
- 1. "Army of Me" Released: 24 April 1995; 2. "Isobel" Released: 14 August 1995; 3. "It's Oh So Quiet" Released: 13 November 1995; 4. "Hyperballad" Released: 12 February 1996; 5. "Possibly Maybe" Released: 28 October 1996; 6. "I Miss You" Released: 10 February 1997

Post is the second studio album by Icelandic singer Björk. (Note: Post is officially considered to be her second solo album. It is Björk's third solo studio album if her 1977 self-titled release is taken into account. Some sources consider the album as fourth, adding Gling-Gló to the count, a 1990 collaboration with Tríó Guðmundar Ingólfssonar.) It was released on 12 June 1995 by One Little Indian Records. Continuing the style developed on her first album Debut (1993), Björk conceived of Post as a bolder and more extroverted set of songs than its predecessor, featuring an eclectic mixture of electronic and dance styles such as techno, trip hop, IDM, and house, alongside that of ambient, jazz, industrial, and experimental music. Björk produced Post herself with co-producers including Nellee Hooper, 808 State's Graham Massey, and former Massive Attack member Tricky. She wrote most of the songs after moving to London and intended the album to reflect her new life in the city.

The album reached number one in Iceland, number two in the United Kingdom and number 32 in the United States. It was certified gold in New Zealand and Sweden, and platinum in Australia, Canada, the US, and the UK. Six singles were released: "Army of Me", "Isobel", "It's Oh So Quiet", "Hyperballad", "Possibly Maybe", and "I Miss You", with three reaching the UK top 10. Their accompanying music videos were noted for their surrealism, themes of nature and technology, and artistic development of the medium. A remix album titled Telegram was released in 1996.

During Post's commercial peak, Björk was affected by promotional touring and media attention. She assaulted a reporter and survived a murder attempt. Björk would relocate to Spain away from the press and produce her next album, Homogenic (1997). Considered an important exponent of art pop, Post has been praised by critics for its ambition and timelessness. It was named one of the greatest albums of 1995 by numerous publications, and has since been named one of the greatest albums of all time by publications including Entertainment Weekly and Rolling Stone.

== Recording and production ==
"[Post was] reflecting my life at the time. Kinda big city, big lights, Trafalgar Square kind of energy… [I'd been an introvert] all my life and then suddenly I was very extroverted… But maybe also knowing that you didnt want to do that forever… it was a once-in-a-lifetime kind of thing."

— Björk, 2022.

Björk released her previous studio album Debut in 1993. At that time, she had moved to London. The production of Debut was "long and laborious", as Björk sought to fully realise the songs she wrote from the past. After its release, she began to look for new ideas in the present for her next album. She contacted producer Nellee Hooper who had worked with her on Debut. He initially encouraged her to produce the album herself, but agreed when she insisted. Björk agreed to co-produce with other enlisted producers; "to make it stay fresh, she had to think about other people being involved". With Hooper's confirmation, Björk commenced work on the album in late 1994 at the Compass Point Studios in Nassau. The picturesque locale inspired Björk to meld the recording process with the exotic natural environment. For example, Björk waded into the ocean and recorded vocals while the sun set, captured by a digital recorder powered by a generator on the beach. The first version of "Cover Me" was recorded entirely from a cave.

Björk incorporated songs she had written in Manchester with 808 State's Graham Massey before the recording of Debut. These included "Army of Me" and "The Modern Things", which she had performed live and did not need to be extensively changed. Björk said she left "Army of Me" off Debut as she felt Debut "was a more gentle energy and Post was more raw, more brutal". Massey said: "With 'Army of Me' we wanted to try something that was quite hard and techno-y. I'm not sure how she wrote those lyrics so fast but I remember that song being almost instantaneous. [...] We kind of knocked that off in one day and then started on 'The Modern Things' the same day and finished that the next."

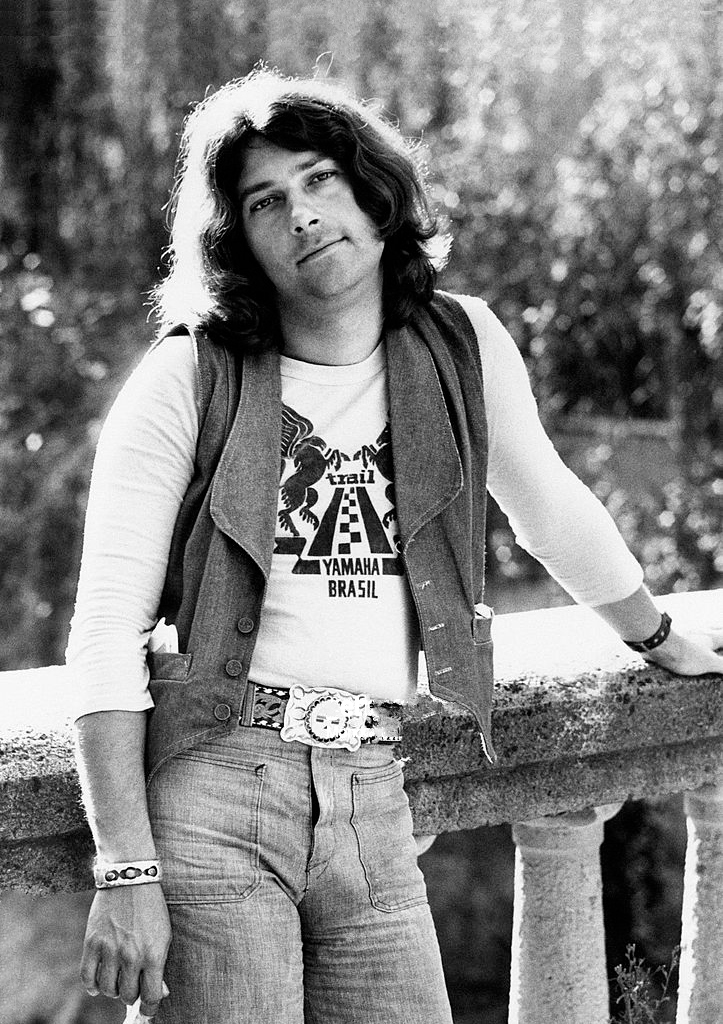
Eumir Deodato's involvement with Post greatly influenced the sound of the album.

Although the album was supposed to be delivered the day after she returned from the Bahamas, Björk felt it was not yet complete and continued its production in London. She enlisted a new team of engineers and programmers, and spent the next months "tweaking, rearranging, and sometimes completely rerecording her pre-existing tracks". Ultimately, it was the inclusion of more "real" instruments that "resuscitated Post for Björk". Björk continued to compose songs such as "Isobel", which was created while she was visiting Reykjavík for Christmas, before bringing it back to Hooper's studio. The song's lyrics were written in collaboration with Icelandic poet Sjón, which was his first songwriting experience. Sjón would become a frequent collaborator throughout Björk's career. She also enlisted trip hop artist Tricky to assist in producing the album, on the condition that he would work on two tracks on her album and she would contribute two vocals for his album. Their collaboration resulted in the Post songs "Enjoy" and "Headphones"—in addition to "Keep Your Mouth Shut" and "Yoga", which appeared on Tricky's 1996 studio album, Nearly God.

The track that underwent the most extensive change was "I Miss You", an old song from the Debut era. Howie Bernstein gave the song its "Latin-tinged [rhythm]". Back in London, Björk contacted "old standby" Talvin Singh to record additional percussion parts for it. Fellow former Sugarcubes member Einar Örn Benediktsson was also contacted to play the trumpet on "Enjoy". English sessionist Gary Barnacle was enlisted to play the saxophone. Brazilian composer Eumir Deodato participated on the album at Björk's request. She contacted him after hearing his arrangements of a Milton Nascimento song called "Travessia". Deodato's presence as composer and conductor "immediately bolstered" the songs "Hyperballad", "You've Been Flirting Again" and "Isobel". This addition of strings, brass and percussion elements gave Post the balance Björk felt her original recordings had lacked. "It's Oh So Quiet" was the last track to be recorded. By the time the album was finished in April 1995, the list of co-producers included Björk, Hooper, Bernstein, Massey, and Tricky. Björk has said: "The people I collaborated with were all people I was hanging out with in clubs in London. I had known them all for a while before we ended up working together."

== Composition ==
=== Musical style ===
"On Post she uncovers a range of specific sounds—not broad styles—that best express her emotions and color her arrangements. With little awe or irony, Björk blends these recognizable scraps and otherworldly snippets into a striking pattern of her own design, making Post an album that's post-everything but akin to nothing else."

— Lorraine Ali, Rolling Stone, 1995.

Björk's website described Post as "a bit of a bolder side of [Björk], who now had ventured all the way from Iceland to England, and was exploring the faster pace and big city life that this new country brought. This album became influenced of that and became more adventurous and club-friendly as a contrast to the shy first album, Debut." While IDM and trip hop influences were present on Debut, Post is characterised by Björk's fuller incorporation of these genres. The balance between synthetic and organic elements in Post —generated through the combination of electronic and "real" instruments—is a recurring characteristic of Björk's output. Simon Reynolds wrote in 2011 that "Post tapped into the vortex of multicultural energy that was mid-90s London where she had relocated, and where strange hybrids such as jungle and trip-hop were bubbling". Post has been described as art pop, experimental pop, and avant-pop.

With its eclectic nature, Post touches on various musical styles. When asked if this variety of genres was intentional, Björk replied: "Yes, I'm very aware of that. I've got very many sides to me." Björk described Post as "musically promiscuous" and "spastic". In 1996, when asked about the album's musical influences, she stated: "I'm influenced by everything. By books, by the weather, by the water, by my shoes, if they're comfortable or not. Everything."

=== Songs ===
"Hyperballad"
Sample of "Hyperballad". it features morbid lyrics which actually reveal the singer's joie de vivre. Pitchfork wrote: "The song is full of tension—traditional balladry backed by pulsing house music; modernity contrasted with the natural world; Björk's voice vacillating between focused discipline and unrestrained expression."

"Isobel"
Sample of track "Isobel". With its "visually rich narrative", various critics likened its distinctive tempo to journeying through desert landscapes.

The album opens with "Army of Me", an aggressive song with industrial rock, and trip hop influences. It incorporates a looped drum sample of Led Zeppelin's "When the Levee Breaks". Dedicated to Björk's younger brother, the song's lyrics are, according to Björk herself, "about telling someone who is full of self-pity and doesn't have anything together to get a life and stand up"; as she sings: "And if you complain once more/You'll meet an army of me!" "Hyperballad", is a track that incorporates electronic and orchestral styles, with a sound NME described as being "altered from gentle folktronica to drum and bass-tinted acid house". Its lyrics are about Björk pondering her own suicide, as she throws objects off a cliff as a form of Exorcism before returning to her partner. The track is followed by "The Modern Things", a song that, in a magical realist tone, "playfully posits the theory that technology has always existed, waiting in mountains for humans to catch up". Interview described it in 1995 as a "spooky tune", noting "the odd scratchings at the end" of the track. The big band track "It's Oh So Quiet" covers a German composition made famous by Betty Hutton. It has been described as "a palate-cleanser during the course of the record". Björk included the song "just to make it absolutely certain… that every song would be a shock".

The following track, "Enjoy", a song concerning the links between sex and fear, has been considered "decidedly trippy", and "Post's most abrasive track". NME described it in its 1995 review as, "a dark and deranged techno thing". Over military drums and "squalls of noise", Björk sings about "her hedonistic tendencies". The orchestral interlude "You've Been Flirting Again", like the previous track "Enjoy", features "mysterious or open-ended lyrics". They are an attempt to describe the ambiguous nature of flirting. "Isobel" is a string-laden, orchestral trip hop song, Craig McLean of The Face called the track "Broadway on breakbeats". Conceived by Björk as "part autobiography part storytelling", its lyrics concern Isobel, a woman magically born in a forest who finds people in the city "a bit too clever for her", eventually retreating back to nature and sending them a message of instinct through trained moths.

"Possibly Maybe" is an ambient dub track that fuses trip-hop and chill-out music and has a slide guitar in the background. Its lyrics document the various stages of Björk's failed relationship with Stéphane Sednaoui. With the track, Marius de Vries (keyboards/programming) "create[d] a vinyl-crackling ambience, full of glissando strings and leaden, muted bass. "I Miss You" was described in 1997 as an "amalgam of styles, with electronic drums melding into African bongos mixed with jazzy horn playing". A house music number, its "horn-infused Afro-Cuban strains [...] reflect the romantic whimsy of [its] lyrics". Björk wrote "Cover Me", one of the quieter moments on the album, to her co-producer Nellee Hooper after he agreed to participate in the making of Post. She has said: "I guess I was trying to make fun of myself, how dangerous I manage sometimes to make album making. And trying to lure him into it. But it is also a admiration thing from me to him". The album ends with the experimental "Headphones", an ambient track. Featuring "just-for-headphones studio tricks", it has been described as "a chiming, somnolent dip into Björk's heavy-lidded pre-dream state". Its lyrics were written as a thank you to Graham Massey, who would make compilation cassettes for Björk. She also stated: "But, of course, it is also a love letter to sound. The sound of sound. Resonances, frequencies, silences and such... a music-worship thing".

== Title ==
Björk said the title Post refers to the fact that all the songs were written after her move to England, in contrast to Debut, the songs of which were written while she was still living in Iceland. In a 1996 interview, Björk said: "I always knew it would be two albums and that's why I called them Debut and Post. Before and after." The title also has the meaning of "mail", inspired by Björk's desire to communicate with friends and family in Iceland.

== Artwork ==
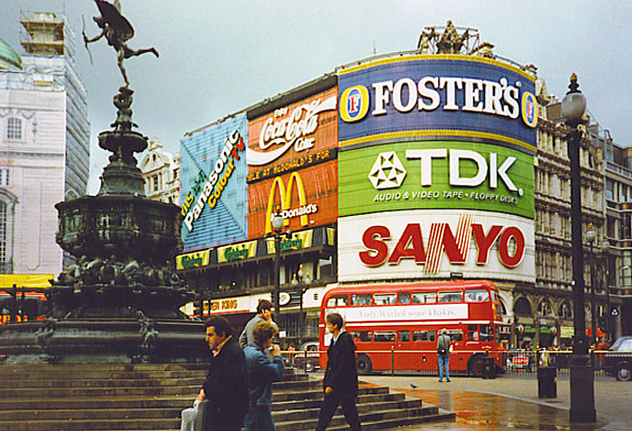
Björk intended the album artwork to resemble Piccadilly Circus.

Me Company designed the album artwork, while Martin Gardiner modeled the lotus flower in the booklet and packaging. The album depicts Björk in Piccadilly Circus, London, her pale skin and dark hair contrasting with the colours of the Japanese-inspired signs behind her. The photograph was taken on 1 April 1995 by Stéphane Sednaoui. The designer Paul White of Me Company, who had collaborated with Björk since her time with the Sugarcubes, "surrounded her with giant postcards to represent communication with friends and family". Björk said "my musical heart was scattered at the time and I wanted the [cover] to show that".

The jacket Björk wears was inspired by Royal Mail airmail envelopes, referencing the album title. It was specially crafted from Tyvek envelope paper by the designer Hussein Chalayan. The jacket is displayed under glass at Hard Rock Reykjavík, and was part of the 2015 Björk exhibition in the Museum of Modern Art, New York City. Vice identified the airmail jacket as one of the "ultimate fashion moments" of Björk's career. A photograph of Björk surrounded by silver balls was planned as the cover, but it was scrapped in favour of something "more poppy". The photo later appeared in a 1995 article for The Face.

== Release and promotion ==
Post was released on 12 June 1995, as a 12" record, CD, and compact cassette. It was issued on One Little Indian Records in the United Kingdom and Elektra Records in the United States and Canada; Polydor Records issued Post in Australia and Japan, also releasing the European edition of the album. In September 1995, Björk and poet Sjón released Post, a paperback book meant to be a "pictorial and verbal record of the making of that album". It contained interviews with Björk and also focused on the European leg of the tour. The Post tour was her first proper North American tour as a solo artist, with Aphex Twin as her opening act. While in the United States, she also appeared on Late Night with David Letterman; this tour "helped maintain Post's momentum and keep Björk in the public eye", since airings of "Army of Me" and "Isobel" had been relegated primarily to after-hours alternative music shows in MTV. In the United Kingdom, Björk also performed on Top of the Pops on several occasions. In 1996, Björk took part in Arnold Schoenberg's Pierrot lunaire, conducted by Kent Nagano and the Opera orchestra of Lyon. In addition, Björk also appeared in several music magazines.

In November 1996, Björk released the "often-delayed" remix project Telegram, which contained reworkings of several songs from Post, with her voice re-recorded. Telegram has been described as "effectively a completely new album". Author Mark Pytlik writes, "Promises of a Post remix album had been circulating since the release of "Army of Me" in April 1995. To compensate, Björk announced the release of a string of 12″ remixes beginning in June, limited to only 1,000 copies each. Producers and musicians featured on Telegram include: Dillinja, Eumir Deodato, LFO, and Graham Massey, among others; Björk only remixed "You've Been Flirting Again" herself. The album also contains a new composition, "My Spine", a collaboration with British percussionist Evelyn Glennie. Telegram spent five weeks on the US Billboard 200 chart, peaking at number 66. In the UK, it peaked at number 59, spending two weeks on the albums chart.

In 2005, the UNICEF charity record Army of Me: Remixes and Covers was released; it is a collection of seventeen eclectic remixes of "Army of Me". All profits went directly to the charity, to assist the victims of the 2004 Indian Ocean earthquake and tsunami. Live at Shepherds Bush Empire was released as a VHS in November 1998, containing the last performance of the Post tour, which took place at Shepherd's Bush Empire in February 1997. Post Live, a live album consisting of songs recorded during the Post tour, was included in the 2003 box set Live Box. The 2002 box set Family Tree includes demos and alternate versions of various tracks off the album. Post has been reissued several times, adapting to different formats such as colored records, 180g vinyl, and DualDisc. A remastered version of the album in surround sound was included in the box set Surrounded, which was released in 2006 on Elektra Records. In 2012, Universal Japan issued a limited edition of Debut and Post together as one compilation . All of Post's music videos were included on the 1998 video release Volumen, and its 2002 reissue Volumen Plus. They also appear on Greatest Hits – Volumen 1993–2003, a release that includes the videos featured on Volumen and Volumen Plus. They are also featured on video compilations of its directors, including The Work of Director Michel Gondry and The Work of Director Spike Jonze, all of them from 2003.

== Singles ==
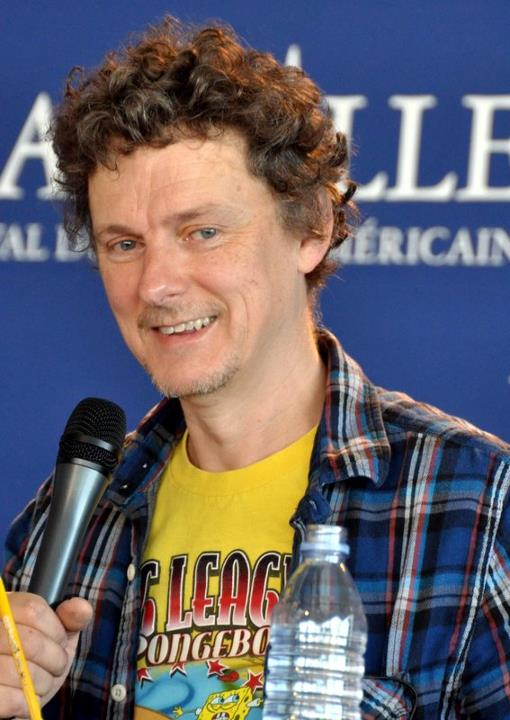
Michel Gondry directed the videos for "Army of Me", "Isobel" and "Hyperballad".

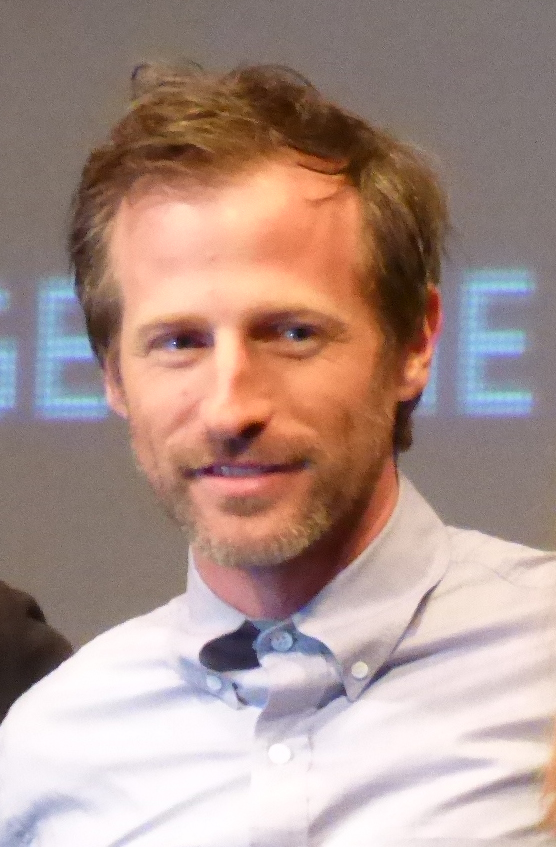
Spike Jonze directed the music video for "It's Oh So Quiet".

=== Army of Me ===
"Army of Me" was released as the lead single from Post on 24 April 1995, shortly after the album's production concluded. It was released in the United Kingdom as two different CD releases, with "Cover Me", "You've Been Flirting Again", "Sweet Intuition", and various remixes as its B-sides. A commercial success, it peaked atop the Íslenski Listinn Topp 40, as well as at numbers five and ten in Finland and the United Kingdom, respectively. In the United States, it peaked at number 21 on the Alternative Airplay chart. Michel Gondry directed the video for "Army of Me", which takes place in a cyberpunk environment. In the video, Björk is seen driving a massive truck, which has been described as "alternately [looking] like an overgrown SUV and a science fiction tank" as she quests to rescue her loved one from an art museum.

=== Isobel ===
"Isobel" was released as the second single on 14 August, with B-sides "Charlene", "I Go Humble", "Venus as a Boy", and several remixes. Although the record company was against the idea of releasing "Isobel", Björk insisted because she "felt intuitively that this was the right choice". However, "Isobel" did not replicate the success of "Army of Me", peaking at number two in Iceland and number 23 in the UK. The music video for "Isobel", directed by Gondry, represents the story of the title character Björk envisioned with Sjón. It tells the story of "a wild child discovering urban culture through installations of toy fighter planes", over lush superimposed imagery. Like in the lyrics, where Björk takes the role of narrator and protagonist, she plays two different parts in the music video: Björk is seen as the Isobel who "weaves and composes this world and this story on her organ", and as the Isobel who inhabits this primal world.

=== It's Oh So Quiet ===
"It's Oh So Quiet" was released as the third single on 13 November. Its B-sides included "You've Been Flirting Again", "Hyperballad", "Sweet Sweet Intuition" (a rework of "Sweet Intuition"), and "My Spine". The music video for "It's Oh So Quiet" became one of the most played clips on MTV, and the song became Björk's most successful single, peaking at number one in Iceland and within the top ten in Australia, Finland, Ireland, Scotland and the UK, while peaking at number nine on the US Billboard Hot 100's extension Bubbling Under Hot 100 chart. The single was certified gold by the British Phonographic Industry (BPI) for shipments of 400,000 units in the UK. Spike Jonze directed the music video for "It's Oh So Quiet", a homage to Hollywood's Technicolor musicals that drew inspiration from Busby Berkeley and Jacques Demy's The Umbrellas of Cherbourg. Like Demy, Jonze "mines the magical from the mundane," as he transforms a drab auto shop into the location where Björk dances and sings with a full dance company, an attempt to reflect the "exuberance" of her vocal performance.

=== Hyperballad ===
"Hyperballad" was released as the fourth single on 12 February 1996. The single—consisting of two separate CDs—also included remixes of the song, "Isobel" and "Cover Me". Some regions also included a double A-side single with the song "Enjoy", although it only received a number of promo remixes. It peaked at number eight on the UK Singles Chart and atop the US Dance Club Songs. The music video for "Hyperballad", also directed by Gondry, has been described as "a techno-dream visual story full of flashing lights, buzzing static, and holograms." It shows Björk as "a character running through a landscape that simulates that of a computer game, only to throw herself off a cliff." The clip is an attempt to reflect the song's story, so Gondry depicted Björk lying down as a dead body, with a holographic image of her singing superimposed on her.

=== Possibly Maybe ===
"Possibly Maybe" was released as the fifth single on 28 October via several 12-inch records and three different CD releases. A limited-edition 12-inch double A-side with remixes of "Possibly Maybe" and "Enjoy" (by Mark Bell and Dom T., respectively) was also released. "Possibly Maybe" peaked at number 13 on the UK Singles Chart. Sednaoui directed the music video for "Possibly Maybe", despite the song being about his failed relationship with Björk. Björk and Sednaoui had previously worked together in the music video for "Big Time Sensuality". In the clip, she appears "as a goddess, floating out from a numinous light-streaked background." Sednaoui is known for having a particularly filmic technique for each of his clips; in "Possibly Maybe", the use of blacklighting "makes Björk glow sensuously and perversely". It was conceived in a theatrical way: nearly all of the scenes were filmed in the same space, which is transformed with changes in the mise-en-scène. The style of "Possibly Maybe"'s scenery and Björk's wardrobe reference East Asian imagery, and a Japanese traditional doll is featured as Björk's only accompaniment; as a silent witness, it is the object on which the protagonist casts reflections on her own identity. Regarding the video, Sednaoui said: "Her song and my video were a way of saying things to each other that we couldn't say otherwise."

=== I Miss You ===
"I Miss You" was released as the sixth and final single on 17 February 1997. Although it became Björk's third US Dance Club Songs number-one single, it was the least successful single from Post in Europe, as it peaked only at number 36 on the UK Singles Chart. The animation of its music video was produced by John Kricfalusi and directed by Erik Weiss. It was promptly censored on MTV because of its nudity and violence towards the end.

== Critical reception ==
Professional ratings
Contemporary reviews
Review scores
Source	Rating
AllMusic	5/5 stars
Chicago Tribune	3.5/4 stars
Entertainment Weekly	A+
The Guardian	4/5 stars
Los Angeles Times	3/4 stars
Music Week	5/5 stars
NME	7/10
Q	4/5 stars
Rolling Stone	4/5 stars
Spin	8/10
The Village Voice	C+

Upon its release, Post received universal acclaim from music critics. Lorraine Ali of Rolling Stone praised the album for differentiating from the alternative rock offerings of the early 1990s, and for successfully merging disparate styles. She concluded: "When Post comes to an end, it feels like getting back from a good vacation: the last thing you want to do is re-enter the real world". Writing for Entertainment Weekly, Jim Farber stated that despite Post's "bizarre" combination of diverse genres, the conviction of Björk's delivery and assuring hooks "[made] her most surreal passages as relatable as moon-June standards". He felt that Björk "[reinvented] that tradition, constructing standards for the cyber age".

Joy Press, who reviewed the album for The New York Times, praised the album for not being a "play-safe sequel" to Debut, pointing out that Björk, "[had] followed her most wonderfully wayward impulses". Los Angeles Times critic Richard Cromelin felt that Post was "an often heady mix of trendiness and nostalgia" that was capable of transcending Björk's self-consciousness. Greg Kot of the Chicago Tribune found the album's backing tracks to be "even more varied and unusual" than on Debut, describing Björk as "an extra-terrestrial voice rummaging around in a sonic toybox". Spin's Barry Walters felt the album was an improvement over its predecessor, stating its songs were "stronger, more developed, and less reliant on Björk's wide-eyed delivery". He concluded that: "After years of (no) alternative fascist grunge domination, it's heartening that Björk and producer-co-songwriter Nellee Hooper stayed true to themselves and created another highly personal album that has a chance of interrupting the airwave flow of whiny rockers with little imagination".

Writing for MTV Online, Lou Stathis wrote that, "[it's mostly] Björk's wacky, mind-altered perspective that makes Post modern pop music at once both baffling and engaging". He believed that the album was a rewarding experience for both the casual consumer, as well as the serious listener, also pointing out that, "it not only sounds good while you're listening to it, but it leaves you feeling good when it's over, too". Robert Christgau, reviewing the album for The Village Voice, was more critical. He found that the album's "eccentric instrumentation" and "electronic timbres" failed to compensate for its lack of "groove" and was unmoved by Björk's lyrics, which he said "might hit home harder if she'd grown up speaking the English she'll die singing, but probably wouldn't".

== Commercial performance ==
Post reached the top ten of several countries, including Australia, Belgium, Canada, Denmark, the Netherlands, Finland, France, Germany, Ireland, New Zealand, Norway, Portugal, Sweden, Switzerland, and the United Kingdom. Post also peaked at number two on the European Top 100 Albums chart. The album peaked at number 32 in the Billboard 200, almost 30 places higher than the peak position of its predecessor Debut. It also received an enthusiastic reception from college radios. Post also reached top 40 in Hungary and Japan. The album was certified platinum in Australia, Canada, the United Kingdom, the United States, and Europe; and gold in Sweden and New Zealand. In 2007, The Washington Post reported that Post had sold 810,000 units in the United States according to Nielsen SoundScan; it had sold 36,000 additional copies by 2015.

== Controversies ==
The music video for "Army of Me" was removed from MTV's playlist before it aired because its ending depicted Björk bombing an art museum; the Oklahoma City bombing happened at this time. Author Mark Pytlik wrote that this "foreshadowed a string of unlucky events that would further hinder Post's unveiling".

Robin Rimbaud filed a lawsuit demanding a co-songwriter credit for "Possibly Maybe", claiming that the song sampled his work. After Rimbaud's label New Electronica refused a sample clearance compensation of £1,000 from One Little Indian founder Derek Birkett, Björk and Birkett resolved to destroy over 100,000 copies of the album to create a new version without the sample. However, at the request of Rimbaud, New Electronica gave Björk permission to use the sample.

Musician Simon Fisher sued Hooper and Björk over writing credits in Debut (1993), but these charges were cleared by judge Robin Jacob. According to Pytlik, these events resulted in "the strangest promotional tour anyone could have ever envisioned: in the week since Post had been released, Björk had seen her album deleted, her video banned, and two separate lawsuits brought against her". One Little Indian were also better prepared to promote the album, scheduling a string of European and American tour dates from the beginning of July into late August.

During the Post era, the extensive media attention and a world tour of 105 dates began to affect Björk. She repeatedly complained about the intrusiveness of tabloids and reporters. On tour in February 1996, Björk arrived at Bangkok International Airport with her son Sindri after a long flight. While the pair walked through the arrival terminals, reporter Julie Kaufman approached them and said, "Welcome to Bangkok!" Björk charged at Kaufman and wrestled her to the ground. It was later reported Kaufman had been bothering Björk and Sindri for days prior. The incident was reported around the world.

On 12 September, an obsessed American fan, Ricardo López, sent a letter bomb rigged with sulfuric acid to Björk's residence in London, returned home and filmed his suicide. Police contacted Scotland Yard, who intercepted the package without incident. To record in privacy away from the unwanted interest of the press, Björk's tour drummer Trevor Morais offered her his studio in Málaga, Spain, to record her next album, Homogenic.

== Impact and legacy ==
"Björk's recorded output has always been ahead of the curve, both in its embracing of technology and its audacious ambition and inherent eccentricity. What's truly arresting, though, is just how vibrant, how astoundingly fresh, her work sounds today… Post's influence is felt far and wide today, and not exclusively in dance and electronica circles… The [album] continue[s] to inspire, and [its] imperial design qualifies it as a timeless classic."

— Mike Diver, BBC Music, 2009.

Professional ratings
Retrospective reviews
Review scores
Source	Rating
AllMusic	5/5 stars
Pitchfork	10/10
The Rolling Stone Album Guide	4/5 stars
Slant Magazine	5/5 stars
Spin	4/5 stars

Nick Coleman of The Independent considered Post to be an important release of the art pop genre, Retrospectively, Slant Magazine's Eric Henderson argued that Post "will likely always remain the Björk album that most successfully sustains her winning balance of experimental whimsy and solid pop magic", while Heather Phares of AllMusic wrote that the record was "not simply Debut redux" and concluded: "The work of a constantly changing artist, Post proves that as Björk moves toward more ambitious, complex music, she always surpasses herself". Celebrating the album's 20th anniversary, the British magazine NME described it as, "a masterful matching of hard, up-to-the-minute beats with complex, personal lyrics about the rush and rage of being a modern urban woman".

The album's influence has been identified as being increasingly palpable on the contemporary music landscape, and later reviews of the album also make note of the timeless aspect of the music. Writing for The Daily Review, James Rose wrote in 2015: "Post is where mainstream music could have gone. While modern chart music hasn't gone there entirely[,] she undoubtedly helped broaden the playing field. [The album] stands today as a body of work that still informs the more marginal artistic fringes of modern music and reminds us how narrow and staid our world would be without outliers like Björk. Also in 2015, Andrew Shaw of Nerdist felt that Post "chose to ignore expectation, market restrictions, and contemporary trends", and that Björk "pushed her vocal performances into new places, where no other vocalists could dare to sing". He compared the album's impact on audiences to that of Jimi Hendrix's 1967 album, Are You Experienced, writing it "set the benchmark for what was possible when you take tradition and set it on fire". Raymond Ang of The Wall Street Journal considered Post to be "Björk's last stab at the pop game… she would dig deeper into her increasingly avant-garde interests and, in the years to come, thrill and challenge her audience".

David Longstreth of Dirty Projectors is an admirer of the record, stating he was influenced by Björk's deconstruction of classic melodies. American singer-songwriter Amy Lee has said Post is "one of the biggest records in [her] life". DJ Shadow sampled "Possibly Maybe" in "Mutual Slump", a track off his 1996 album, Endtroducing...... The Vitamin String Quartet—known for its series of tribute albums to rock and pop acts—covered "Army of Me" and "You've Been Flirting Again" in the 2001 album, Ice: The String Tribute to Björk. In 2008, Stereogum released a compilation of cover versions in homage to the album, titled Enjoyed: A Tribute to Björk's Post. It features Dirty Projectors, Liars, Xiu Xiu, High Places and Atlas Sound, among other artists.

Much of Post's six music videos have gone on to become classics—most notably "It's Oh So Quiet" and "Army of Me". At the time of its release, music videos were beginning to be used as an art form, and Björk's visual output during this period—and her career in general—have become a clear example of the medium's artistic legitimation. Spanish writer Estíbaliz Pérez Asperilla has identified recurring motifs and themes through Björk's videography; these include nature and a magnified depiction of Björk. Surrealism and technology have also been identified as recurring features in Björk's visual output of this period. David Ehrlich of Time Out considered her "one of the first artists to meaningfully explore the aesthetic and semiotic value of CG and its relationship to the [videos]." Writing for Paste, Alexa Carrasco felt, "Björk has created some of the most beautiful and weird videos to ever play on MTV." The popularity of the music video for "It's Oh So Quiet" made the song one of Björk's most ubiquitous tracks, and was considered her first breakthrough on MTV. The music videos—and the pink boots Björk wears in "Hyperballad" (the work of Belgian designer Walter Van Beirendonck)—were displayed in the Museum of Modern Art, New York City, as part of the 2015 Björk exhibition. They were also featured in the 2016 exhibition, Björk Digital, which premiered at Carriageworks as part of the Vivid Sydney festival.

In 2008, when asked how she felt about the album in retrospect, Björk reflected: "I was kinda surprised how the odd spastic thing of the album had actually aged well."

== Accolades ==
By the end of 1995, Post appeared on the year-end lists of multiple publications. In The Village Voice's Pazz & Jop critics' poll for 1995, the album placed at number seven. At the 1995 Icelandic Music Awards, Post received the award for Album of the Year; Björk was also awarded Artist of the Year, Female Singer of the Year, Composer of the Year, and was nominated for Songwriter of the Year. Additionally, "Army of Me" received the Song of the Year award, with "Isobel" also being nominated. She also received the Best Female award at the 1995 MTV Europe Music Awards, and Best International Female at the Rockbjörnen Awards. Björk was also nominated for the Nordic Council Music Prize. In 1996, she received her second Best International Female Solo Artist award at the 16th Brit Awards. She received the same distinction at the Danish Music Awards, the International Dance Music Awards, and the Italian Music Prize. In 1996, Post was nominated for Best Alternative Music Album at the 38th Annual Grammy Awards, was awarded an IFPI Platinum Europe Award, and the ASCAP Vanguard Award given by the American Society of Composers, Authors and Publishers. For the album's music videos, "Army of Me" was nominated for Best Special Effects in a Video and the International Viewer's Choice Award at the 1995 MTV Video Music Awards. "It's Oh So Quiet" was nominated for the Best Music Video award at the 38th Annual Grammy Awards, losing to Janet and Michael Jackson's "Scream". At the 1996 MTV Video Music Awards, the video was awarded the Best Choreography in a Video award, and was nominated for Best Female Video, Breakthrough Video, Best Direction, Best Art Direction in a Video, and International Viewer's Choice Award (MTV Europe).

Vibe included the album in its 1999 list of the 100 Essential Albums of the 20th Century. In 2003, Slant Magazine included the record on its list of 50 Essential Pop Albums. The same publication later considered it the second-best album of the decade in a 2011 list, only behind Björk's next release, Homogenic, writing that it "is [her] most scatterbrained work to date, but it's tied together flawlessly by [Björk's] singular whimsicality". In 2003, Pitchfork listed it as the 20th best album of the decade, with William Morris writing, "few artists on this list could rival [Björk] in terms of innovation, vision, talent, and high-yield experimentation, and Post was the record to establish this." In a 2012 article, Paste considered Post to be the sixty-fourth best album of the decade, with Ryan Reed stating: "no Björk album is as weird (or weirdly wonderful) as 1995's Post, a dizzying whirlwind of sonic textures and stylistic shifts that demonstrates every facet of her ever-expanding bag of tricks. [...] Björk clearly aimed to demonstrate the meaninglessness of genre boundaries. She succeeded." Post was ranked at number 376 on Rolling Stone's "500 Greatest Albums of All Time" list, with the publication praising its "utter lack of musical inhibition," and ranked at number 289 on the 2020 updated list. The American publication Consequence of Sound placed the album at number seventy-nine on their 2010 list of the Top 100 Albums Ever, with Harry Painter writing: "Björk is one of few artists who could put out an album juxtaposing blistering electro-pop with big band, club-ready tribal dance with downtempo trip-hop and find both critical and commercial success." In 2015, Post placed on number 69 on Spin's list of the 300 Best Albums of the Past 30 Years, claiming that "[Björk's] fearless plunge into styles is matched by the aplomb with which she bares her anxieties and aspirations." Also in 2008, FNAC placed the album at number 246 in its list of the 1000 best albums of all time. In an unordered list of 500 essential albums compiled for Vanity Fair in 2013, English musician Elvis Costello included Post and mentioned "Hyperballad" as a highlight of the record. In the album's entry of the "Women Who Rock: The 50 Greatest Albums of All Time" list of 2012, Rolling Stone felt, "Björk's artistic stature grew by yards in the course of this strange, affecting work, by turns harshly industrial, meditative and neon jubilant."

== Track listing ==
Post – Standard edition
No.	Title	Writer(s)	Producer(s)	Length
1.	"Army of Me"	Björk; Graham Massey	Björk; Massey; Nellee Hooper	3:54
2.	"Hyperballad"	Björk	Björk; Hooper	5:21
3.	"The Modern Things"	Björk; Massey	Björk; Massey; Hooper	4:09
4.	"It's Oh So Quiet"	Bert Reisfeld; Hans Lang	Björk; Hooper	3:37
5.	"Enjoy"	Björk; Tricky	Björk; Tricky	3:54
6.	"You've Been Flirting Again"	Björk	Björk	2:29
7.	"Isobel"	Björk; Marius de Vries; Hooper; Sjón	Björk; Hooper	5:46
8.	"Possibly Maybe"	Björk	Björk; Hooper	5:05
9.	"I Miss You"	Björk; Howie B	Björk; Howie B	3:59
10.	"Cover Me"	Björk	Björk	2:06
11.	"Headphones"	Björk; Tricky	Björk; Tricky	5:40
Total length:				46:04

Post – Japanese edition (bonus track)
No.	Title	Writer(s)	Producer(s)	Length
12.	"I Go Humble"	Björk; Mark Bell	Björk; Hooper	4:44
Total length:				50:55

Post – Australian and Asian limited tour edition (bonus disc)
No.	Title	Writer(s)	Producer(s)	Length
1.	"Sweet Intuition"	Björk; Ken Downie; Ed Handley; Andy Turner	The Black Dog; Björk	4:43
2.	"Venus as a Boy" (Harpsichord version)	Björk	Hooper; Björk	2:13
3.	"Hyperballad" (Brodsky Quartet version)	Björk	Björk; Hooper; Brodsky Quartet	4:20
4.	"Charlene"	Björk; The Black Dog	Björk; Hooper	4:44
Total length:				16:00

Post – Surrounded DualDisc edition (bonus DVD)
No.	Title	Length
1.	"Army of Me" (music video)	4:27
2.	"Isobel" (music video)	4:17
3.	"It's Oh So Quiet" (music video)	4:00
4.	"Hyperballad" (music video)	4:00
5.	"Possibly Maybe" (music video)	5:14
6.	"I Miss You" (music video)	4:03
7.	Untitled ( (Note: The disc total is 72:05 if you count the album in 5.1 surround.))
Total length:		26:01

== Personnel ==
Credits adapted from the liner notes of Post.

=== Musicians ===
- Björk – vocals, arrangements, keyboards, organ, string arrangements, brass arrangements, beat programming
- Howie Bernstein – programming
- John Altman – orchestra arrangements, conducting
- Marcus Dravs – programming
- Lenny Franchi – programming
- Graham Massey – keyboards, programming
- Tricky – keyboards, programming
- Marius de Vries – keyboards, programming
- Gary Barnacle – soprano saxophone
- Stuart Brooks – trumpet
- Jim Couza – hammer dulcimer
- Einar Örn Benediktsson – trumpet
- Eumir Deodato – string arrangements, conducting
- Isobel Griffiths – orchestral contracting
- Maurice Murphy – trumpet
- Tony Pleeth – cello
- Guy Sigsworth – harpsichord
- Talvin Singh – percussion
- Rob Smissen – viola
- Gavin Wright – orchestra leading

=== Technical personnel ===
- Björk – production
- Howie Bernstein – production, engineering, mixing
- Marcus Dravs – engineering, mixing
- Al Fisch – engineering
- Lenny Franchi – engineering
- Nellee Hooper – production
- Graham Massey – production
- Steve Price – engineering
- Mark "Spike" Stent – mixing
- Al Stone – engineering
- Tricky – production

=== Artwork ===
- Martin Gardiner – lotus flower modelling
- Me Company – artwork packaging design
- Stéphane Sednaoui – photography

== Charts ==
=== Weekly charts ===
Weekly chart performance for Post
Chart (1995–1996)	Peak position
Australian Albums (ARIA)	2
Austrian Albums (Ö3 Austria)	13
Belgian Albums (Ultratop Flanders)	5
Belgian Albums (Ultratop Wallonia)	3
Canada Top Albums/CDs (RPM)	4
Danish Albums (Hitlisten)	4
Dutch Albums (Album Top 100)	5
European Albums (Music & Media)	2
Finnish Albums (Suomen virallinen lista)	3
French Albums (SNEP)	6
German Albums (Offizielle Top 100)	6
Hungarian Albums (MAHASZ)	34
Icelandic Albums (Tónlist)	1
Irish Albums (IFPI)	6
Italian Albums (Musica e Dischi)	24
Japanese Albums (Oricon)	26
New Zealand Albums (RMNZ)	4
Norwegian Albums (VG-lista)	4
Portuguese Albums (AFP)	6
Scottish Albums (Official Charts)	2
Spanish Albums (AFYVE)	24
Swedish Albums (Sverigetopplistan)	2
Swiss Albums (Schweizer Hitparade)	5
UK Albums (Official Charts)	2
US Billboard 200	32
US Cashbox Top 100 Albums	26

Chart (2025)	Peak position
Icelandic Albums (Tónlistinn)	16

=== Year-end charts ===
1995 year-end chart performance for Post
Chart (1995)	Position
Australian Albums (ARIA)	92
Austrian Albums (Ö3 Austria)	43
Belgian Albums (Ultratop Flanders)	29
Belgian Albums (Ultratop Wallonia)	39
Canada Top Albums/CDs (RPM)	33
Dutch Albums (Album Top 100)	63
European Albums (Music & Media)	27
German Albums (Offizielle Top 100)	43
New Zealand Albums (RMNZ)	44
Swedish Albums (Sverigetopplistan)	40
Swiss Albums (Schweizer Hitparade)	50
UK Albums (OCC)	36

1996 year-end chart performance for Post
Chart (1996)	Position
UK Albums (OCC)	95

== Certifications and sales ==
Certifications and sales for Post
Region	Certification	Certified units/sales
Australia (ARIA)	Platinum	70,000^{^}
Belgium (BRMA)	Gold	25,000^{*}
Canada (Music Canada)	Platinum	100,000^{^}
Iceland	—	8,333
Japan (RIAJ)	Gold	100,000^{^}
New Zealand (RMNZ)	Gold	7,500^{^}
Sweden (GLF)	Gold	50,000^{^}
United Kingdom (BPI)	Platinum	300,000^{^}
United States (RIAA)	Platinum	846,000
Summaries
Europe (IFPI)	Platinum	1,000,000^{*}
Worldwide	—	3,000,000
^{*} Sales figures based on certification alone.^{^} Shipments figures based on certification alone.

== Release history ==
Release dates and formats for Post
Region	Date	Edition(s)	Format(s)	Label(s)	Ref.
France	7 June 1995	Standard	CD	Mother	
Germany	9 June 1995	Standard	CD	Mother	
United Kingdom	12 June 1995	Standard	Cassette; CD	One Little Indian	
United States	13 June 1995	Standard	Cassette; CD	Elektra	
Japan	16 June 1995	Standard	CD	Polydor	
Australia	26 June 1995	Standard	CD	Polydor	
Germany	26 June 2006	Surrounded	DualDisc	Mother	
United Kingdom	3 July 2006	Surrounded	DualDisc	One Little Indian	
United States	25 July 2006	Surrounded	DualDisc	Elektra	
Japan	7 September 2011	Standard	SHM-CD	Universal Music	
United Kingdom	9 March 2015	Standard	Vinyl	One Little Indian	
Various	29 January 2016	Standard	Vinyl	One Little Indian	
United Kingdom	26 April 2019	Standard	Cassette (reissue)	One Little Indian	

== See also ==
- Album era
- Media studies
- Music of the United Kingdom (1990s)
- Postmodern art

== Bibliography ==
- Beebe, Roger; Middleton, Jason, eds. (26 September 2007). Medium Cool: Music Videos from Soundies to Cellphones. Duke University Press. pp. 105–106. ISBN 978-0-8223-4162-8.
- Bianciotto, Jordi (1 February 2008). Guía Universal Del Rock: de 1990 Hasta Hoy (in Spanish). American Bar Association. p. 147. ISBN 9788496222731.
- Bucher, Stefan (1 February 2006). All Access: The Making of Thirty Extraordinary Graphic Designers. Rockport Publishers. pp. 52–53. ISBN 1-59253-277-2.
- Buckley, Peter (1999). The Rough Guide to Rock. Rough Guides. p. 97. ISBN 978-1-85828-457-6.
- Gordinier, Jeff; Weingarten, Marc, eds. (20 April 2015). Here She Comes Now: Women in Music Who Have Changed Our Lives. Rare Bird Books. p. 78. ISBN 9781785780615.
- Hoffmann, Frank (2005). Encyclopedia of Recorded Sound. Routledge. p. 218. ISBN 978-0-415-93835-8.
- Lester, Paul (1996). Björk: The Illustrated Story. London: Hamlyn. p. 72. ISBN 0-600-59067-4. "'Army of Me' ... the first release to be taken from her second solo album proper, 'Post'"
- Plagenhoef, Scott; Schreiber, Ryan, eds. (November 2008). The Pitchfork 500. Simon & Schuster. pp. 127–128. ISBN 978-1-4165-6202-3.
- Poynor, Rick (2006). Designing Pornotopia: Travels in Visual Culture. Laurence King Publishing. ISBN 978-1-56898-607-4.
- Pytlik, Mark (2003). Björk: Wow and Flutter. ECW Press. ISBN 1-55022-556-1.
- Salaverri, Fernando (September 2005). Sólo éxitos: año a año, 1959–2002 (in Spanish) (1st ed.). Madrid: Fundación Autor/SGAE. ISBN 84-8048-639-2.
- Simpson, Paul (12 January 2004). The Rough Guide to Cult Pop. Rough Guides. p. 97. ISBN 978-1-84353-229-3.
- Whitburn, Joel (2004). Hot Dance/Disco: 1974–2003. Record Research. p. 35.
- Wolk, Douglas (2004). "Björk". In Brackett, Nathan; Hoard, Christian (eds.). The New Rolling Stone Album Guide (4th ed.). Simon & Schuster. pp. 73–74. ISBN 0-7432-0169-8.
