= Isobel (song) =

1995 single by Björk

Single by Björk

from the album Post
- B-side: "Charlene"; "I Go Humble"; "Sweet Intuition"; "Venus as a Boy"; "Hyperballad"
- Released: 14 August 1995
- Recorded: 1994–1995
- Studio: Eden (London); Compass Point (Bahamas)
- Genre: Trip hop
- Length: 5:47
- Label: One Little Indian
- Songwriters: Björk; Nellee Hooper; Marius de Vries; Sjón
- Producers: Björk; Nellee Hooper

Björk singles chronology
"Army of Me" (1995)	"Isobel" (1995)	"It's Oh So Quiet" (1995)

Isobel song cycle singles chronology
"Human Behaviour" (1993)	"Isobel" (1995)	"Bachelorette" (1997)

Music video
- "Isobel" on YouTube

"Isobel" is a song by Icelandic singer-songwriter Björk for her second studio album, Post (1995). Written by Sjón based on a story by Björk, the lyrics of "Isobel" tell the story of the title character, who is magically born in a forest and sends a message of instinct amongst the logical thinking of the people of the city. The story of Isobel has been explored in "Human Behaviour" and "Bachelorette", forming a trilogy. The track was released as the second single for the album in August 1995 by One Little Indian. Featuring additional songwriting by Nellee Hooper and Marius de Vries, string arrangements by Eumir Deodato, and production by Hooper and Björk, "Isobel" combines a lush orchestral sound with electronic breakbeats.

Most commentators were enticed by "Isobel", which they declared one of the highlights of the Post album. The single peaked at number eighteen on the Finnish Singles Chart, twenty-three on the UK Singles Chart, and forty-seven on the New Zealand Singles Chart. The song was included in the compilation album Greatest Hits (2002), whose tracks were selected by fans through a survey.

The accompanying music video for "Isobel" was directed by frequent collaborator Michel Gondry and represents the story the lyrics convey. The surreal video resembles an early film and garnered acclaim from critics, although it received no support from MTV. Björk has performed "Isobel" on various television shows and in six of her tours, the most recent being the Utopia tour.

== Background and conception ==
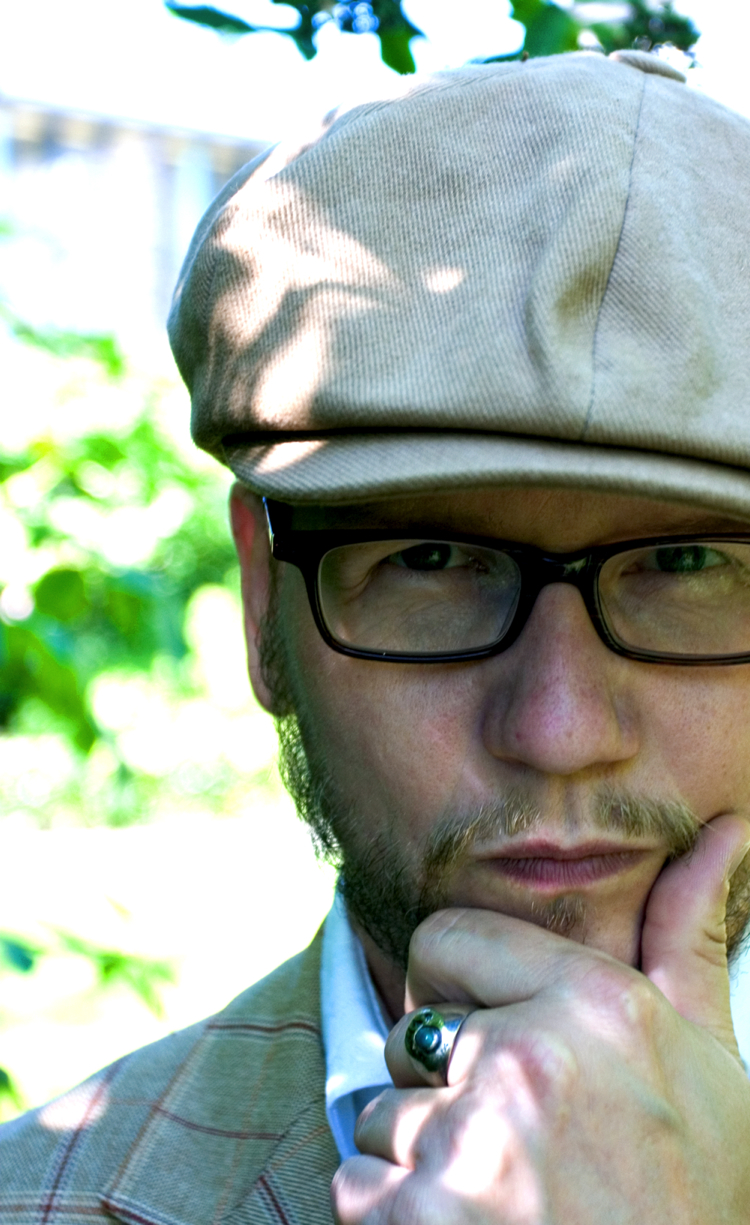
"Isobel" marked Icelandic poet Sjón's first collaboration as a songwriter, who has frequently written lyrics for Björk since.

"Isobel" originated amongst the most complicated in the tracks contained in Post and perhaps in all of Björk's work. The song's lyrics were written in collaboration with Icelandic poet Sjón, his very first songlyric. Together with Þór Eldon, Björk's ex-husband and member of the Sugarcubes, Sjón and the singer had been part of a circle of anarchist poets in Reykjavík called Medusa and had met while she was a member of Kukl. Sjón would become a frequent collaborator throughout Björk's career.

Björk came up with the melody for "Isobel" during a Christmas visit to her native Iceland. She worked on a portable Casio keyboard and brought it to Nellee Hooper —British producer who had produced her previous studio album, Debut (1993)— who added a snare and sound effects to Brazilian musician Eumir Deodato's string arrangements. Deodato explained his work: "In some of the songs I followed her secondary vocal lines; there was very little harmony and very few chords. I was doing that on 'Isobel' too, where I wrote a natural C in a line that was in B minor. Much later on I learned that Björk is the type of singer who will sing the A sharp in A minor, but I wasn't yet aware that she did that when I did that first song."

The lyrics were the final addition to the song. The original idea for the lyrics dates back to late 1994, when a moth stayed on the collar of Björk's shirt until the evening. Interpreting the incident as a kind of omen, she tried to create a story and a character about it, writing 900 pages of a diary. She recalls: "I'd been fighting like a lunatic, and going completely bonkers. I knew that if I waited for three months, threw away the book, preferably burning it, then I'd wake up one morning with the lyric. But I badly wanted this song on the album. I didn’t know what to do." Thus she decided to contact Sjón, explaining the story of the title character to him.

The song forms a trilogy with "Human Behaviour" of Debut (1993) and "Bachelorette" of Homogenic (1997). Björk explained: "In 'Human Behaviour', she's a little girl. In 'Isobel', she moves to the big city and big lights. [...] In 'Bachelorette' she takes over and trees grow over the city". Their respective music videos, directed by Michel Gondry, represent this story. In a 2008 interview with Stereogum, she also included "Oceania" of Medúlla (2004) and "Wanderlust" of Volta (2007) in this narrative cycle.

== Composition and lyrics ==
"Isobel"
Over a lush string arrangement, Björk describes how the title character sends a message of instinct through trained moths.

That's about moving to a city for a person who comes from nature, and I've lived 27 years in hardcore nature. I'd been reading a lot of South American literature. I like Allende but especially Márquez, his books are very popular in Iceland. To me they are like Frida Kahlo's paintings where there's two of her – one is oldtime Mexican, the other a modern 20th century woman. It's magic realism, asking how 20th century civilisation clashes with nature and, in places like Iceland and Thailand, people really believe they can have a TV remote control in one hand and a ghost sitting beside them.
—Björk for Melody Maker, December 1996

"Isobel" is a string-laden, orchestral trip hop song written by Björk, Nellee Hooper, Marius de Vries and Sjón. According to pianist Steve Boudreau, the main chord progression is a variant of the Richard Rodgers and Lorenz Hart staple "My Funny Valentine", with both songs relying on a minor chord with all the harmonic motion in the upper voice. In "My Funny Valentine" it descends chromatically from the root, while in "Isobel" it forms more of a circle. Various critics have discussed the song's distinctive pace, with Pulse!'s Tom Lanham describing it as "lazy [and] unassuming", like "a camel making its way across the desert", and Rolling Stone's Lorraine Ali writing the song "snakes along like a patient desert caravan". Maurice Murphy's trumpet opens the piece, followed by Deodato's lush string arrangements and Hooper's sound effects which Björk has described as "jungle-istic". Craig McLean of The Face called the track "Broadway on breakbeats."

The lyrics of "Isobel" were noted as having a "visually rich narrative" by website Stereogum, and have been variously described as a fairy tale, a children's story, a fable, and a lullaby. Björk has described the story in many interviews, like in 1995 with Eurotrash:

This is the story of Isobel; she was born in a forest by a spark, and as she grew up, she realized that the pebbles on the forest floor were actually skyscrapers. And by the time she was a grown-up woman and the skyscrapers had taken over the forest, she found herself in a city, and she didn't like all the people there so much, because they were a bit too clever for her.

She decided to send to the world, all these moths that she had trained to go and fly all over the world and go inside windows of people's houses— the ones that were too clever— and they'd sit on their shoulder and remind them to stop being clever and start to function by their instincts. They do that by saying "Nah-nah-nan-nah-nah!" to them... (Björk waves a finger in front of her face)... and then they'd say "Oh! Sorry! I was being all clever there!", and start functioning on instinct.

In the city, Isobel "dances naked on tables and falls in love with all the wrong people and causes pain", so she decides to live in isolation once again. Throughout the track, Björk shifts from a third person narration to a first person narration, placing herself as both the narrator and the protagonist. This duality is represented in the single's artwork —which features Björk kissing herself— and the song's music video. The singer has indeed described the lyrics as "part autobiography part storytelling". In the first verse, Björk describes Isobel's birth: "In a forest pitch-dark / Glowed the tiniest spark / It burst into a flame / Like me". When singing "My name Isobel / Married to myself / My love Isobel / Living by herself" the singer describes Isobel's isolation and also "to have that relationship with [herself] and be self-sufficient and surprise [herself]."

Björk has said the character's name is Isobel instead of Isabel as a reference to "isolation". The character also gets its name from Isobel Griffiths, an arranger that was collaborating on the album. She envisioned the tale inspired by epic stories like those of Colombian writer Gabriel García Márquez —wanting to create "a very South American sort of drama"—, and 19th century literature. Björk has also described the character as mythological, saying she represents intuition in the way Atlas stands for strength and Neptune is the god of the ocean. In an interview with Politiken, she also agreed that the song describes "the duality between reason and emotions, between intuition and intellect". Being a fan of Brazilian music, Björk affirmed she wrote the song whilst listening to Brazilian singer Elis Regina, to whom she later dedicated the song.

== Release ==
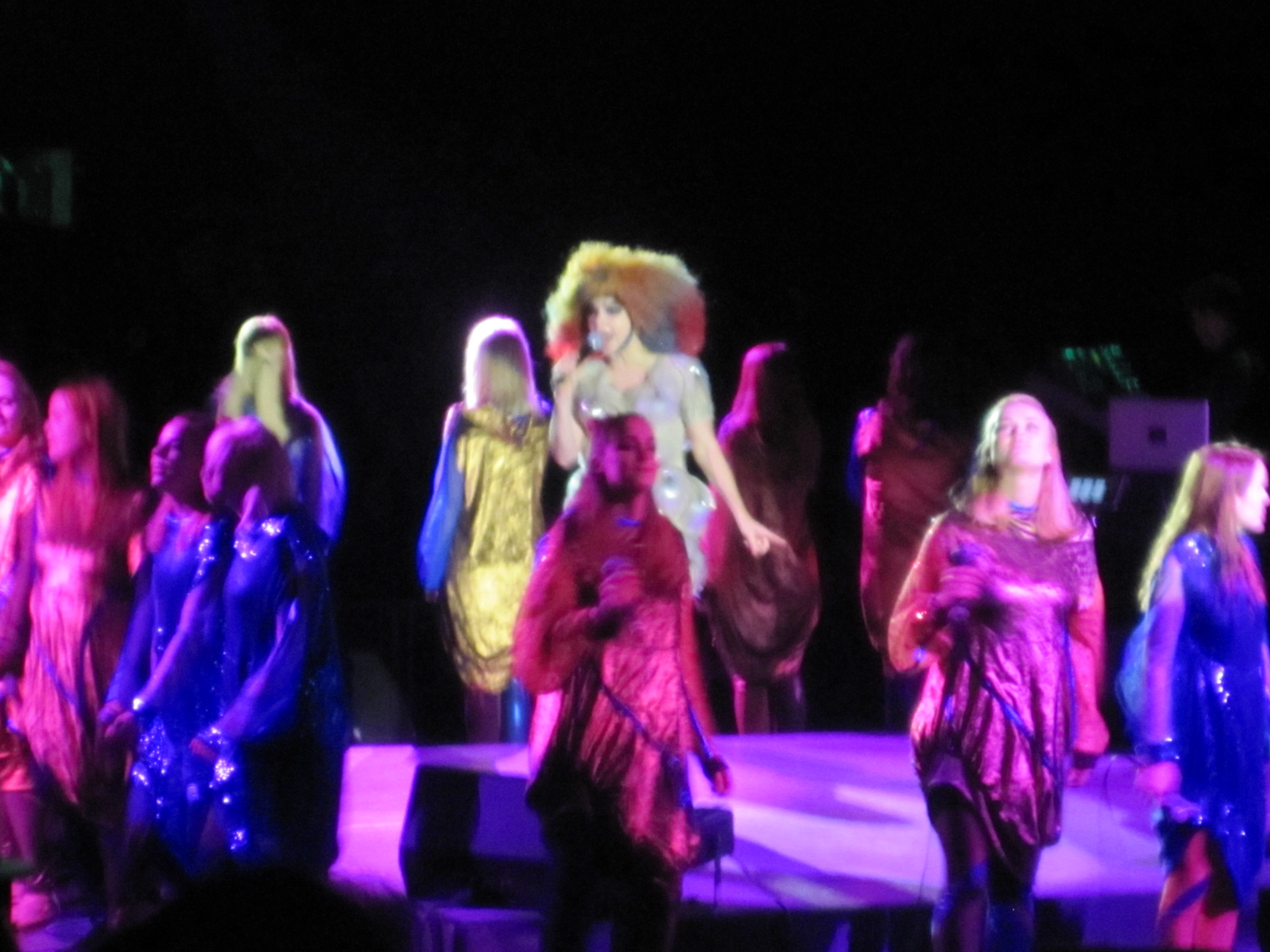
Björk performing "Isobel" as part of the Biophilia tour, at the Cirque en Chantier on 24 February 2013

Although the record company was against the idea of releasing "Isobel" as the album's second single after "Army of Me", Björk insisted because she "felt intuitively that this was the right choice". "Isobel" came out as a single on 14 August 1995 as two different CD singles and a cassette single. Both singles' cover art were designed by Me Company and contain a poster photographed by Jürgen Teller; CD1's cover artwork was photographed by Andrea Giacobbe, and shows Björk kissing another Björk. "Isobel" was also included in the 1996 remix album Telegram (in its Deodato Mix version), and the 2002 "best of" album Greatest Hits, whose tracklist was determined by fans through an online survey.

CD1 featured the B-side "Charlene", a mid-tempo song with sexually suggestive and ambiguous lyrics inspired by friend Kadamba Simmons. It also included the techno track "I Go Humble", which LFO released without the vocals under the title "Shove Piggy Shove" in the 1996 album Advance, and a slowed-down version of "Venus as a Boy" with Guy Sigsworth playing the harpsichord. CD2's B-sides are three remixes of "Isobel": one by Eumir Deodato featuring "Brazilian sensibilities", a "vaguely ambient" one by Sigtryggur Baldursson of The Sugarcubes, and a jungle one by Goldie.

== Critical reception ==
"Isobel" garnered acclaim from music critics. Heather Phares of AllMusic highlighted the song's production and arrangement, writing that especially in this track Post "[aims] for, and [accomplishes] more" than simply a Debut redux. BBC's Mike Diver called it a "brilliant [single]", and his personal favourite. Considering it as one of the "most compelling moments", the Billboard review for Post described the track as "delightfully airy". James Masterton wrote in his weekly UK chart commentary in Dotmusic, that the track "finds the Icelandic pixie in an ethereal mood with one of those strange meandering songs which shows off her voice to brilliant effect yet hardly makes for a commercial pop single." Taylor Parkes from Melody Maker named "Isobel" the "top dog" of the album, declaring it as "a magic carpet ride through the snowy night sky, a flushed cityscape giving way to miles of silent farmland, then finally the sea." Pan-European magazine Music & Media said, "Lighter than "Army of Me", radio won't have trouble with this one on which Björk's weird vocal technique and the off-the-wall production are embedded in sonically-friendly strings."

Simon Williams from NME noted "where tribal rhythms spiral into enormous swathes of galloping pop fluffiness". Another NME editor, Mark Sutherland, called it "another inoffensive tinkle". The New Rolling Stone Album Guide commented that "Isobel" features a "more assured [melody] for Björk's voice to circle like Christmas lights," and referred to it as "a light-headed ode to self-adoration." Michael Snyder of the San Francisco Chronicle wrote, "She's a feral jungle girl on "Isobel" with its cool Brazilian rhythms and wide-screen strings." Music journalist Mark Pytlik considered the UK CD1 release of "Isobel" to be "the finest of the Post-era singles, and certainly a nice refuge from the deluge of remixes that were to follow." "Isobel" was included in the list of Singles of the Year of The Face at number 12 and Spex at number 24. It was also listed at number 28 in Panorama's The 30 Best Singles of the Year 1970-98 in 1999, and was nominated for the Icelandic Music Award for Song of the Year, losing to her own "Army of Me". "Isobel" peaked at number 18 on the Finnish Singles Chart, 23 on the UK Singles Chart, and 47 on the New Zealand Singles Chart.

== Music video ==
=== Development ===
Michel explains very well the way I create my songs. When I write, I plant little seeds. Then, the question is: When will they be ripe? And that is up to Michel. For example, my favorite Michel video is "Isobel". It's Michel who found the poetry in it. He also found the thread we had on the first videos: "Human Behaviour", "Isobel" and "Bachlorette"... It's the same story with the same character who is neither Björk nor Gondry but a third person: us.
—Björk for Melody Maker, December 1996

The music video for "Isobel" was directed by Michel Gondry, who had directed the avant-garde videos for "Human Behaviour" and "Army of Me". It was filmed for two days in a forest in Dolgellau, near Llangollen, Wales. A "long day" of shooting also took place in Black Island Studios in London on 31 May 1995. The crew used a Mitchell S35 camera with varispeed to be able to rewind the camera and do superimpositions and masks, inspired by Georges Méliès' work. "Model Solutions", an English model maker crew, built the harmonium used in the video, and the art department led by Joseph Bennett brought the model planes, insects, and lightbulbs. The filming process was not easy, as the day was rainy, no one was quite sure of what they were doing, and Björk did not like her outfit (she wears two different outfits in the video for this reason). To get projections to appear inside the water organ of the video, the crew used a mirror trick and filmed it in London, as the screen for rear projections was big and needed much distance. The final music video was projected in 35mm for the crew in a cinema in London; with its varying exposures, lighting effects and monochromatic schema, it resembles an early film.

=== Synopsis ===
Björk harvests planes from the lamps she has seeded in the Isobel music video.

The music video for "Isobel" represents the story of the title character Björk envisioned with Sjón. It tells the story of "a wild child discovering urban culture through installations of toy fighter planes", over lush superimposed imagery. Like in the lyrics, where Björk takes the role of narrator and protagonist, she plays two different parts in the music video: Björk is seen as the Isobel who "weaves and composes this world and this story on her organ", and as the Isobel who inhabits this primal world. Water is the primary feature of her world, Gondry using it as a dreamy transition tool between scenes.

Isobel plays a piano that is full of pipes that fill it with water. Children play in the water, and wear masks. Isobel is later shown lying beside a river wearing a dress with lights in it. She pulls some light bulbs off her dress and plants them in the ground. The light bulbs grow and act as incubators or cocoons for toy airplanes inside them. When the airplanes grow big enough, they break out of the bulbs and fly away. At the same time, numerous skyscrapers grow out of the ground and eventually are covered in cockroaches. Isobel is also shown walking through the countryside, up a mountain, and beside a river.

=== Reception ===
The video received general acclaim from critics. The video, however, received little support from MTV, as airings of both the video for "Isobel" and the video for "Army of Me" had been relegated primarily to the show 120 Minutes. Sal Cinquemani of Slant Magazine included the video in his list of the Top 10 Björk Music Videos, describing the video as "surreal [and] visually striking". Ed Gonzalez of the same publication described the video as "Jean Epstein-ian kabuki horror".

The video for "Isobel" was later published on Björk's official YouTube channel in February 2020. It has amassed about 1.4 million views as of February 2023.

== Live performances ==
Björk performed "Isobel" on BBC One's Top of the Pops on two occasions in August 1995; the first was on 17 August, live from New York City, and the second one was on 24 August. The song was also performed on Björk's set on MTV Live show in February 1998. It was also performed on all of Björk's tours since its release, excluding the Volta tour. Performances of the song were added to video releases Live at Shepherds Bush Empire (1998), Live in Cambridge (2001), Live at Royal Opera House (2002), and Björk: Biophilia Live (2014).

== Track listings ==
- French 12-inch single
1. "Isobel" (Dim's Enchanted Forest) – 9:31
2. "Isobel" (Transfunk Remix) – 8:40
3. "Isobel" (Ln's Remix) – 6:40
4. "Isobel" (Dim's Hi Compact French Touch) – 7:35
5. "Isobel" (Dim's Ol' School Dubstrumental) – 7:24
- French CD
1. "Isobel" – 5:46
2. "Isobel (Deodato Mix) – 6:09
3. "I Go Humble" – 4:44
4. "Sweet Intuition" – 4:42
- UK CD1
1. "Isobel" – 5:48
2. "Charlene" – 4:45
3. "I Go Humble" – 4:46
4. "Venus as a Boy" (Harpsichord) – 2:13
- UK CD2
1. "Isobel" – 5:48
2. "Isobel" (Deodato Mix) – 6:11
3. "Isobel" (Siggtriplet Blunt Mix) – 4:50
4. "Isobel's Lonely Heart" (Goldie Remix) – 8:09

== Personnel ==
Personnel are adapted from Post's liner notes.

- Written by Björk, Nellee Hooper, Marius de Vries and Sjón
- Production – Björk, Nellee Hooper
- Programming – Marius de Vries
- Keyboards – Björk and Marius de Vries
- Recording engineers – Howie Bernstein and Steve Price
- Assistant engineer – Oswald "Wiz" Bowe, Kirsten Cowie, Adrian Scarff and Gorby
- Mix engineer – Al Stone
- String arrangement – Eumir Deodato and Björk
- Conductor – Eumir Deodato
- Orchestral contractor – Isobel Griffiths
- Orchestral leader – Gavin Wright
- Principal viola – Rob Smissen
- Principal cello – Tony Pleeth
- Trumpet – Maurice Murphy

== Charts ==
=== Weekly charts ===
Weekly chart performance for "Isobel"
Chart (1995)	Peak position
Australia (ARIA)	67
Canada Rock/Alternative (RPM)	13
Europe (Eurochart Hot 100)	80
Finland (Suomen virallinen lista)	18
Iceland (Íslenski Listinn Topp 40)	2
Israel (Israeli Singles Chart)	14
Netherlands (Dutch Single Tip)	11
New Zealand (Recorded Music NZ)	47
Scottish Singles Sales (Official Charts)	29
UK Singles (Official Charts)	23

=== Year-end charts ===
Year-end chart performance for "Isobel"
Chart (1995)	Position
Iceland (Íslenski Listinn Topp 40)	27

== Release history ==
Release dates and formats for "Isobel"
Region	Date	Format(s)	Label(s)	Ref.
United Kingdom	14 August 1995	CD1; CD2; cassette	One Little Indian	
Australia	28 August 1995	CD; cassette	Mother; Polydor	
Japan	25 September 1995	CD	Mother	
