= I Miss You (Björk song) =

1997 single by Björk

Single by Björk

from the album Post
- B-side: "Karvel"; "Headphones"; "Hyperballad"
- Released: February 1997
- Studio: Swanyard; Whitfield Street (London, England)
- Genre: Alternative dance; funk; worldbeat
- Length: 4:00
- Label: One Little Indian
- Songwriters: Björk Guðmundsdóttir; Howie Bernstein
- Producers: Björk Guðmundsdóttir; Howie Bernstein

Björk singles chronology
"Possibly Maybe" (1996)	"I Miss You" (1997)	"Jóga" (1997)

Alternate cover

Music video
- "I Miss You" on YouTube

"I Miss You" is a song recorded by Icelandic musician Björk for her second studio album, Post (1995). It was released in February 1997 by One Little Indian as the sixth and final single from the album. It is amongst her least well performing singles in the United Kingdom, but it hit number one on the US Billboard Dance Club Play chart. The B-side "Karvel" was recorded in one of Björk's first sessions with Graham Massey in 1991; during which two other tracks were also recorded: "Army of Me" and "The Modern Things".

== Background ==
The lyrics describe Björk already knowing who her perfect lover will be, even though she has not yet met him. Nine years later, the remastered version, as it appears on the release of the 2006 album Surrounded, features a newly recorded vocal take.

== Critical reception ==
Larry Flick from Billboard magazine wrote, "The time has come for pop radio programmers to finally make room for Björk. This gem from her current collection, Telegram, shimmers with a spine-tinging pop/disco groove, fluttering flamenco guitars à la No Mercy, and deliciously spicy salsa piano lines. All the while, Björk warbles a wickedly contagious chorus in her distinctive vocal style. Radio needs to broaden its parameters and treat its listeners to this record. It could open the floodgates for a refreshing new phase in pop music." Chuck Campbell from Knoxville News Sentinel found that "Björk longs for her dream lover on 'I Miss You', which glides on a smooth, tropical rhythm (with jittery enhancements for spice)."

Dominic Pride from Music & Media commented, "Trumpets and soaring, open-throated vocals evoke memories of Björk's former band the Sugarcubes, but Arabic-style drones and Middle-Eastern percussion betray her more recent ability to hoover up musical styles and make them her own. Showing no desire to compromise for mainstream radio acceptance, Björk's sound again challenges even her ardent fans." British magazine Music Week named it Single of the Week and gave it a top score of five out of five, declaring it as "one of the strongest songs" on the Post album. David Sinclair from The Times said, "Typically bewitching number, accompanied here by a bewildering variety of remixes none of which betters the original."

== Music video ==
Jimmy the Idiot Boy in the "I Miss You" music video.

The accompanying music video for "I Miss You" was produced by Spümcø, and directed by its founder John Kricfalusi, best known for The Ren & Stimpy Show, which Björk admired. The animation was supervised by Erik Wiese and produced by Stephen Worth. Zeus Cervas, Ben Jones, Albert Lozano, Sanjay Patel, Chris Sauvé, Jim Smith and Aaron Springer were amongst the animators who worked on the video.

The first edition of Telegraph, a fan magazine directed by Sjón, read: "To the horror of parents everywhere two of the most disturbed minds in show business (have) come together to make what they promise will be the silliest, most demoralising and, as some depraved souls will undoubtedly say, funniest music video ever!" The video has a surreal and humorous quality, with some sexual imagery.

Björk has red-coloured hair in both the animated and live parts of the video. One of Kricfalusi's characters, Jimmy the Idiot Boy (in which he was naked in some scenes although his genitals were removed), joins her during various parts of the video.

Another Kricfalusi character, George Liquor, makes a cameo in one scene. Also, Fred Flintstone makes a cameo in the scene of the bathroom. An edit was made of the video that covered Björk's breasts. The scene at the end of the music video showing Björk tearing an animated chicken in half was cut during showings on MTV.

When Björk saw the storyboards, she explained that Kricfalusi had "made [her] very cute", and was so pleased that she reportedly exclaimed, "It's like Christmas!" The video won a 1997 Annie Award for Best Animated Short Subject.

== Live performances ==
The track was performed during the Post tour. In support of the release of Post the song was performed on the television show The White Room in 1995, and on the Spanish television show Zona Franca in 1996, to promote the later single release. It was also notably performed on TFI Friday on 19 April 1996, with Howie Bernstein and the TFI Friday House Brass. This performance was later featured on the Post Live album.

Having not been performed live in over a decade, the song would later be performed during the Volta tour with the Icelandic "Wonderbrass" brass section, sometimes also with fellow Sugarcubes vocalist Einar Örn on trumpet.

== Track listing ==
- United Kingdom CD1
1. "I Miss You" – 4:02
2. "I Miss You" (Dobie's Rub Part Two – It's a Hip-Hop Thing) – 5:39
3. "I Miss You" (Underwater Mix) – 9:30
4. "Karvel" – 4:28
- United Kingdom CD2
1. "I Miss You" (Dobie's Rub Part One – Sunshine Mix) – 5:33
2. "Hyperballad" (3am Mix) – 4:16
3. "Violently Happy" (live) – 6:17
4. "Headphones" (Ø Remix) – 6:16
- European CD
1. "I Miss You" – 4:02
2. "Karvel" – 4:28
3. "I Miss You" (Photek Mix) – 5:53
4. "I Miss You" (Dobie's Rub Part Two – It's a Hip-Hop Thing) – 5:39

== Charts ==
Weekly chart performance for "I Miss You"
Chart (1997)	Peak position
Australia (ARIA)	118
Scottish Singles Sales (Official Charts)	47
UK Singles (Official Charts)	36
UK Airplay (Music Control)	62
US Dance Club Songs (Billboard)	1
