= Possibly Maybe =

1996 single by Björk

Single by Björk

from the album Post
- B-side: "Vísur Vatnsenda-Rósu"
- Released: 28 October 1996
- Studio: Compass Point (Nassau, Bahamas)
- Genre: Trip hop; chill-out; ambient dub
- Length: 3:28 (radio edit); 5:06 (album version); 4:52 (album version w/o telephone samples)
- Label: One Little Indian
- Songwriter: Björk
- Producers: Björk; Nellee Hooper

Björk singles chronology
"Hyperballad" (1996)	"Possibly Maybe" (1996)	"I Miss You" (1997)

Music video
- "Possibly Maybe" on YouTube

"Possibly Maybe" is a song by Björk, released as the fifth single from her second album Post (1995). It is a song with deep electronic tones and soft beats that reflects on potential love. Released by label One Little Indian in the United Kingdom as the fifth single from the album, it reached number 13 on the UK Singles Chart in November 1996.

There were three different single releases. This was the first Björk single to be released in three parts; two of these three parts are rarities in the music world in that their A-side is not the first track. The first CD came with a slipcase that could also house the other two. The song has been covered by numerous other artists.

== Background ==
The song details different stages of a breakup. Björk has said it was "the first unhappy song I wrote… I felt ashamed writing a song that was not giving hope". The melancholic piece was dedicated to her broken relationship with Stéphane Sednaoui, who, curiously, also directed the video. Rumours have persisted that Björk recorded the song in the nude, although this has not been publicly commented on. The slide guitar heard in the background of the song was originally intended to be its focal point, as Björk initially strived for an "ambient country" sound inspired by Chris Isaak's "Wicked Game". Björk was sued by British electronic musician Scanner for the uncleared sample of telephones ringing (from his album Mass Observation) at the start of the track. The situation caused her record label, One Little Indian, to retire all current copies of Post in the shops, and release a new version of the album that included a version of "Possibly Maybe" without the sample. Later on, when the issue was solved, the single version of the song included the sample again, as it appears in the music video.

The B-side of single is "Vísur Vatnsenda-Rósu", taken from the 1994 album Chansons des mers froides by Hector Zazou. A short making-of was recorded as part of the album.

== Critical reception ==
British magazine Music Week rated the song four out of five, adding that "this gorgeous ballad from Post is released with some diverse, and weird, mixes as a taster for the upcoming mixes album Telegram."

== Music video ==
Björk in the Stéphane Sednaoui-directed music video for "Possibly Maybe"

The accompanying music video for "Possibly Maybe" was directed by French artist Stéphane Sednaoui, for a song that is about his failed relationship with Björk. The singer and the director had previously worked together in the music video for "Big Time Sensuality". In the clip, she appears "as a goddess, floating out from a numinous light-streaked background." It shows Björk in a variety of different rooms in an apartment. She is primarily shown in a large, stylish bedroom with modern décor. These scenes are intercut with shots in ultra-violet lighting (which subsequently causes everything to appear in day-glo colours). She is also shown in three other rooms: submerged in the bathtub of a bathroom; an Asian-themed room; and a room full of stereo equipment. These scenes are intercut with an angelic image of her dressed all in white, floating out of a blue sky with the sun behind her. The majority of objects appearing in the video were Björk's own.

Sednaoui is known for having a particularly filmic technique for each of his clips; in "Possibly Maybe", the use of blacklighting "makes Björk glow sensuously and perversely". It was conceived in a theatrical way: nearly all of the scenes were filmed in the same space, which is transformed with changes in the mise en scène. The style of "Possibly Maybe"'s scenery and Björk's wardrobe reference East Asian imagery, and a Japanese traditional doll is featured as Björk's only accompaniment; as a silent witness, it is the object on which the protagonist casts reflections on her own identity.

Short interviews with both Stéphane and Björk discussing the video are included on the Stéphane Sednaoui Directors Label DVD. The music video was included along with all of Post's music videos on the 1998 video release Volumen, and its 2002 reissue Volumen Plus. They also appear on Greatest Hits – Volumen 1993‍–‍2003, a release that includes the videos featured on Volumen and Volumen Plus.

== Live performances ==
The track was performed during the Post tour, a performance of which can be found on the 1998 live DVD/VHS Live at Shepherds Bush Empire, a fan-club only concert held at the end of the tour. To support the release of Post, the song was performed on the UK TV show Later... with Jools Holland on 17 June 1995 with pedal steel guitarist BJ Cole. This performance was featured on Björk's 2003 DVD release Later. Björk also performed the track on TFI Friday on 1 November 1996 to promote the official single release. The track was also included on a 1996 ChildLine charity album release, whose cover-art featured a parody of the Post cover. In support of this album, Björk performed the song on Top of the Pops. Björk's then manager Netty Walker noted later that it "was the worst performance I've ever seen her do." A live performance recorded for US TV show Reverb in 2001 included a performance of "Possibly Maybe". The track has been performed on Björk's subsequent tours, the Homogenic tour and the Vespertine world tour, the latter version of which appears on the 2002 DVD release Live at Royal Opera House. After 2001, the song was not performed live until 2 March 2012 at the Roseland Ballroom in New York City during her Biophilia tour, using only a hang drum and a Tesla coil.

== Track listings ==
The release features remixes by Talvin Singh, Mark Bell from LFO, Dallas Austin, Trevor Morais (who was the drummer on the Post tour), Photek and Plaid. The single was planned to coincide with Björk's tour dates in South America and South Africa in October 1996, although the South American concerts were cancelled only two shows in due to Björk suffering from laryngitis. Two live tracks ("Possibly Maybe" and "Hyperballad") recorded at Wembley Arena as part of a Top of the Pops show are included on CD3.

The three UK CD singles originally retailed for 99p each. The first CD came with a free slipcase cover to house the second and third CDs.

- UK CD1
1. "Possibly Maybe" – 5:04
2. "Possibly Maybe" (Lucy Mix) (also featured on Telegram) – 3:03
3. "Possibly Maybe" (Calcutta Cyber Cafe Mix) – 5:33
4. "Possibly Maybe" (Dallas Austin Mix) – 4:50
- UK CD2
1. "Cover Me" (Dillinja Mix) – 6:22
2. "One Day" (Trevor Morais Mix) – 7:01
3. "Possibly Maybe" (Calcutta Cyber Cafe Dub Mix) – 4:56
4. "I Miss You" (Photek Mix) – 5:53
- UK CD3
1. "Big Time Sensuality" (Plaid Mix) – 5:21
2. "Vísur Vatnsenda-Rósu" – 4:20
3. "Possibly Maybe" (live at Wembley Arena) – 4:53
4. "Hyperballad" (Over the Edge Mix) (live at Wembley Arena) – 4:56
- 12-inch single (1)
1. "Possibly Maybe" (Calcutta Cyber Cafe Mix)
2. "I Miss You" (Dobie Rub Part One – Sunshine Mix)
- 12-inch single (2)
1. "Enjoy" (The Beats Mix) – 6:57
2. "Possibly Maybe" (Lucy Remix) – 3:03
- European CD single
1. "Possibly Maybe" (single version) – 5:04
2. "Cover Me" (Dillinja Mix) – 6:22

== Personnel ==
Personnel are adapted from Post's liner notes.

- Björk – production, keyboards
- Nellee Hooper – production
- Marius de Vries – programming, keyboards
- Howie Bernstein – mixing, engineering
- Oswald "Wiz" Bowe – assistant engineering

== Charts ==
Chart (1996)	Peak position
Europe (Eurochart Hot 100)	98
Israel (Israeli Singles Chart)	28
Scottish Singles Sales (Official Charts)	14
UK Singles (Official Charts)	13
UK Indie (Music Week)	1

== Release history ==
Release dates and formats for "Possibly Maybe"
Region	Date	Label(s)	Format(s)	Ref.
United Kingdom	August 19, 1996	One Little Indian	12-inch vinyl (1)	
United Kingdom	August 26, 1996	One Little Indian	12-inch vinyl (2)	
United Kingdom	October 28, 1996	One Little Indian	CD1; CD2; CD3	

== Covers ==
The track was covered by Final Fantasy and Ed Droste for music website Stereogum's 2008 online tribute to Post. As Droste has stated, "Björk is probably my most listened to and adored artist thus far in my life."

Michael Armstrong interpreted the song as an instrumental lullaby for the Rockabye Baby! Lullaby Renditions of Björk tribute album. London Resonance Quartet created another instrumental cover for tribute album Violently. Italian singer Serena Fortebraccio recorded a version for the album In A Shape Of A Girl … Playing On Björk's Heartbeat.

The artists, who released "Possibly Maybe" covers on their own releases include prog-rock band The Roots of Orchis, Polish jazz singer Monika Borzym, hip-hop artist Mumbls, jazz-funk bands Spirit Tuck and The Poma-Swank and the acts such as Wino Willy, Sallow, LumpyPork and others.

== Samples ==
A sample of this song was used in the bumpers for VH1's 'Insomniac Music Theater' late night music video block from the song's release until the program was cancelled in 2005 and renamed 'Nocturnal State'. DJ Shadow sampled this song for the track "Mutual Slump" from his debut album Endtroducing......
