= We Will Not Harm You =

Studio album by Dobie
- Released: 19 February 2013
- Genre: Alternative hip hop, downtempo
- Length: 48:06
- Label: Big Dada

Dobie chronology
The Sound of One Hand Clapping Version 2.5 (2004)	We Will Not Harm You (2013)

We Will Not Harm You is the second studio album by British alternative hip hop musician Dobie, and his first studio album for Big Dada Records. It was released on 19 February 2013.

== Cover art ==
The album's cover art is an original painting by Chris Ofili, who had been friends with Dobie for years before its release.

== Recording ==
In an interview with MTV Hive in 2012, Dobie said, “I suppose it’s just me being brave enough to go where I wanna go, and not trying to follow what everyone else is doing. That was a big thing for me with this album. I was hearing what was going on out there and I was like, ‘I don’t really want to make a record that sounds like that.’" Critics have noted this as a potential influence on the album's eclectic style. Dobie got the idea for the album's title when he heard George Clinton utter it in a Funkadelic documentary. Dobie has also used the phrase to describe the music on the album itself--"It's a bit out there, a bit nutty, but don't be scared of it," he said in a 2013 interview.

== Music ==
The 13 songs on the album are all instrumentals, which differs significantly from the hip hop music Dobie originally became famous for. Instead, the songs on We Will Not Harm You take cues from many disparate genres of music, such as, according to Exclaim!, "Afrobeat, techno, Latin rhythms, jazz and electronica." Artists to whom the album's music has been compared include Flying Lotus and DJ Shadow.

== Reception ==
Professional ratings
Aggregate scores
Source	Rating
AnyDecentMusic?	71/100
Metacritic	73/100
Review scores
Source	Rating
AllMusic	4/5 stars
BBC	mixed
Drowned in Sound	7/10
Exclaim!	7/10 stars
MSN Music (Expert Witness)	(3-star Honorable Mention)
MusicOMH	3.5/5 stars
PopMatters	6/10 stars
The Skinny	4/5 stars

The album received generally favorable reviews. It holds a 73% rating on Metacritic and a 71% rating on AnyDecentMusic?.

== Track listing ==
No.	Title	Length
1.	"The Beginning"	2:39
2.	"Blip 124"	5:13
3.	"Stan Lee Is a Hero of Mine"	4:05
4.	"Then I Woke Up"	2:13
5.	"She Moans"	4:49
6.	"The Chant"	2:28
7.	"Magenta"	4:49
8.	"Somewhere Over There"	2:25
9.	"Crunch Factor No.5"	4:01
10.	"Skit"	0:59
11.	"On the Corner of Ridley Road"	3:46
12.	"Snap, Crackle & Pop"	4:13
13.	"She Wiggles When She Walks"	4:26
