= Harry Winter =

German-Austrian singer (1914–2001)

Harry Winter (24 September 1914 – 3 December 2001), born Horst Winter, was a German-Austrian singer, musician and band director.

== Life and career ==
Born in Beuthen, Upper Silesia (present-day Bytom, Poland), his family moved to Berlin after the Silesian Uprisings in 1921. He studied violin and clarinet at the Academy of Music and played in jazz and swing dance orchestras to earn a living, later becoming a bandleader. During the Nazi era, Winter adjusted to the regulations given by the Reichsmusikkammer and concentrated on singing and light dance music. As a Wehrmacht soldier, he was taken prisoner by American forces in late World War II.

Released from captivity after the war he proceeded to Vienna, where he first performed at the Konzerthaus and founded his own dance orchestra in 1946. His swing concerts became increasingly popular in Allied-occupied Austria. Winter could sign a recording contract and his orchestra was a guest in several Austrian radio shows. In 1948 he recorded the song Und jetzt ist es still, composed by Hans Lang, which, translated into English by Bert Reisfeld (It's Oh So Quiet), was covered by Betty Hutton in 1951 and popularized by Björk in 1995.

In the 1950s Winter performed in several revues and variety films with stars like Marika Rökk, but also played with jazz musicians like Hans Koller and Joe Zawinul. In 1960 he performed at the Eurovision Song Contest in London. His German entry Du hast mich so fasziniert (''You fascinated me so much'')" written by Robert Stolz finished seventh out of thirteen. In 1977 he became Kapellmeister of the highly traditional Austrian Hoch- und Deutschmeister military orchestra.

Winter continued to perform in concerts and TV shows into middle age. He died in Vienna, aged 87.

== See also ==
- Eurovision Song Contest 1960
- Austria in the Eurovision Song Contest

Preceded by Ferry Graf	Austria in the Eurovision Song Contest; 1960	Succeeded by Jimmy Makulis
