= The Future (Rodney P album) =

Studio album by Rodney P
- Released: 18 October 2004
- Recorded: 2003–2004
- Genre: UK hip hop
- Length: 52:12
- Label: Low Life Records, Riddim Killa
- Producer: Rodney P, The Sea

Professional ratings
Review scores
Source	Rating
The Sunday Times	4/5 stars
The Independent	3/5 stars
UKHH	(Favourable) link
BBC	(Favourable) Link
Resident Advisor	link
Spannered	(Favourable) link

The Future is the sole solo studio album by Rodney P released on Low Life Records in 2004.

== Track listing ==
1. "Intro"
2. "The Nice Up"
3. "Da Hot Style"
4. "The Future"
5. "Big Tings Again" (featuring M.C.D)
6. "Fading"
7. "I Don't Care (Time to Party)" (featuring Mystro)
8. "Doggist"
9. "Trouble" (featuring Honey Williams)
10. "Vibes"
11. "No Pets Allowed" (featuring Karizma)
12. "Temper Temper"
13. "We Don't Like Coppers"
14. "I Believe" (featuring Olivia Chaney)
15. "Riddim Killa"
- Track 15 is a CD-only bonus track and does not appear on the vinyl version.

== Singles ==
Single information
"Riddim Killa"
- Released: 5 May 2002
"I Don't Care"
- Released: 12 January 2004
"Trouble"
- Released: 10 April 2004
"The Nice Up"
- Released: 14 March 2005
