= Stereogum =

News site and weblog for indie music

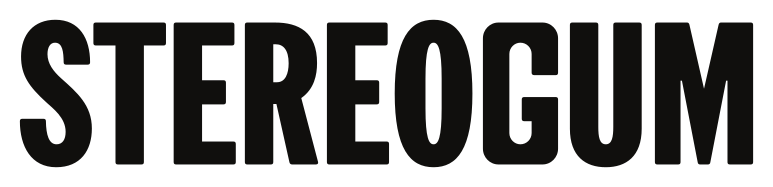
- Type: Online music magazine
- Format: Internet
- Owner: Scott Lapatine
- Editor-in-chief: Scott Lapatine
- Founded: 2002; 24 years ago
- Language: English
- OCLC number: 1142733705
- Website: stereogum.com

Stereogum is a daily Internet publication that focuses on music news, reviews, interviews, and commentary. The site was created in January 2002 by Scott Lapatine.

Stereogum was one of the first MP3 blogs and has received several awards and citations, including the PLUG Award for Music Blog of the Year, Blender's Powergeek 25, and Entertainment Weekly's Best Music Websites. The site was named an Official Honoree of the Webby Awards in the music category and won the OMMA Award for Web Site Excellence in the Entertainment/Music category. In 2011, Stereogum won The Village Voice's Music Blog of the Year.

== History ==
The site was launched on January 1, 2002, by Scott Lapatine with a focus on music discovery and hosting MP3 files. It was named after a lyric from the song "Radio #1" by the French electronic duo Air.

In late 2006, Stereogum received an investment from Bob Pittman's private investment entity The Pilot Group. In November 2007, it was purchased by SpinMedia (formerly known as Buzz Media). April 2008 saw the launch of Videogum, a sister site focused on television, movies, and Web videos. Videogum later closed.

In December 2016, Eldridge Industries acquired SpinMedia via the Hollywood Reporter-Billboard Media Group for an undisclosed amount.

Stereogum's first SXSW event in 2006 was hosted by then-emerging comedian Aziz Ansari and featured a headline performance from Ted Leo. In the years since, Stereogum's events have included sets from Ben Gibbard, Sky Ferreira, Mitski, Beach House, St. Vincent, Deerhunter, Japanese Breakfast, Rico Nasty, and other popular acts.

Popular musicians have been known to participate in Stereogum's active comments section, such as Father John Misty, Weezer's Rivers Cuomo, and Fleet Foxes' Robin Pecknold.

In July 2017, Arcade Fire created the parody site Stereoyum featuring a "Premature Premature Evaluation" of their then-forthcoming album Everything Now.

In January 2020, it was announced that Scott Lapatine, the site's founder and editor-in-chief, had reached an agreement to purchase Stereogum from the Hollywood Reporter-Billboard Media Group, making it once again an independent publication.

Stereogum senior editor Tom Breihan began writing the column "The Number Ones" in January 2018, in which he reviews, analyzes and provides historical context for every number-one single on the Billboard Hot 100. In November 2022, Hachette Book Group published The Number Ones: Twenty Chart-Topping Hits That Reveal The History Of Pop Music, a music history book by Breihan based on his column. In July 2023, Breihan began a counterpart column available to the site's subscribers in which he reviews the number one singles on the Billboard Alternative Airplay chart.

== Album of the Year ==
| Year | Artist | Album | Source |
|---|---|---|---|
| 2009 | Animal Collective | Merriweather Post Pavilion | |
| 2010 | Kanye West | My Beautiful Dark Twisted Fantasy | |
| 2011 | Girls | Father, Son, Holy Ghost | |
| 2012 | Fiona Apple | The Idler Wheel... | |
| 2013 | Kanye West | Yeezus | |
| 2014 | Run the Jewels | Run the Jewels 2 | |
| 2015 | Grimes | Art Angels | |
| 2016 | Beyoncé | Lemonade | |
| 2017 | Lorde | Melodrama | |
| 2018 | Kacey Musgraves | Golden Hour | |
| 2019 | Lana Del Rey | Norman Fucking Rockwell! | |
| 2020 | Fiona Apple | Fetch the Bolt Cutters | |
| 2021 | The War on Drugs | I Don't Live Here Anymore | |
| 2022 | Alvvays | Blue Rev | |
| 2023 | Wednesday | Rat Saw God | |
| 2024 | Charli XCX | Brat | |
| 2025 | Geese | Getting Killed | |

== Music releases ==
In July 2007, Stereogum released OKX, a tenth anniversary tribute to Radiohead's OK Computer. Cover songs were solicited from fourteen indie rock artists including Doveman, Vampire Weekend, John Vanderslice, David Bazan, Cold War Kids, My Brightest Diamond, Marissa Nadler, Chris Funk of The Decemberists, and Chris Walla of Death Cab for Cutie. The album can be heard free of charge at http://www.stereogum.com/okx.

Other free Stereogum compilation albums include: Drive XV, a tribute to R.E.M.'s Automatic for the People (featuring Rogue Wave, Meat Puppets, Sara Quin, and Dr. Dog); Enjoyed, a tribute to Björk's Post (featuring Liars, Edward Droste, Dirty Projectors, Final Fantasy, and Atlas Sound); Stroked, a tribute to The Strokes's Is This It (featuring Real Estate, Owen Pallett, Peter Bjorn & John, and The Morning Benders); MySplice Vols 1-4:, an annual mashup collaboration with team9; and Stereogum Presents... RAC Vol. 1, the first release from Grammy-winning producer RAC.

In 2020, as part of a fundraising effort to keep the site operational and independent, an original 55-track compilation of covers of songs from the 2000s by various artists titled Save Stereogum: An '00s Covers Comp was released as an incentive for donors to the site's Indiegogo campaign. The campaign totaled over $370,000 in donations. It debuted at #1 on Billboard's Compilation Albums chart and #11 on Billboard's Top Album Sales chart.
