= Dobie (musician) =

British alternative hip hop musician and producer

Anthony Alexander Campbell, better known by his stage name Dobie, is a British alternative hip hop musician and producer. His nickname came about due to his resemblance to the character Dobie in the TV detective series Starsky and Hutch.

== Early career ==
Campbell worked as a skateboarder and photographer in the early 1980s. As a photographer, he photographed the skaters in South Bank, and the breakdancers in Covent Garden in the early 1980s. His musical career began in 1989, when he began working on NSO Force Organization tracks for the genre-spanning label Vinyl Solution. Soon afterward, he met Soul II Soul, after which Jazzie B recruited him to produce tracks on their debut album Club Classics Vol. One. He has also remixed albums by Björk, DJ Premier, Massive Attack, and Tricky, as well as the London Posse song "How's Life in London".

== Solo career ==
Campbell's first solo release was an eponymous EP on Howie B.'s Pussyfoot Records in 1995. His first full-length album was The Sound of One Hand Clapping, released in 1998, also on Pussyfoot. It was followed by a remixed version of the album, The Sound of One Hand Clapping Version 2.5, in 2004 on BBE Records. He then released two EPs in 2012: Nothing to Fear and ...But Fear Itself, both on Big Dada Records. His official second album was 2013's We Will Not Harm You, which was also released by Big Dada.

== Personal life ==
Due to Campbell's shy nature, Gilles Peterson has described Campbell as "the Ghost Dog of Stoke Newington".

== Discography ==
=== Studio albums ===
- The Sound of One Hand Clapping (Pussyfoot, 1998)
- The Sound of One Hand Clapping Version 2.5 (BBE, 2004)
- We Will Not Harm You (Big Dada, 2013)

=== EPs ===
- The Dobie E.P. (Pussyfoot, 1995)
- Nothing to Fear (Big Dada, 2012)
- ...But Fear Itself (Big Data, 2012)
