= Hyperballad =

1996 song by Björk

Single by Björk

from the album Post
- B-side: "Isobel"; "Cover Me"; "Enjoy"
- Released: 12 February 1996
- Studio: Compass Point (Nassau, Bahamas)
- Genre: Folktronica; acid house; synth-pop; club music
- Length: 5:21 (album version); 3:58 (radio and video edit)
- Label: One Little Indian
- Songwriter: Björk
- Producers: Björk; Nellee Hooper

Björk singles chronology
"It's Oh So Quiet" (1995)	"Hyperballad" (1996)	"Possibly Maybe" (1996)

Music video
- "Hyperballad" on YouTube

"Hyperballad" (sometimes written as "Hyper-ballad") is a song by the Icelandic musician Björk, released in February 1996, by One Little Indian, as the fourth single from her second solo album, Post (1995). It was written by Björk and co-produced by her long time collaborator Nellee Hooper.

"Hyperballad" incorporates folktronica, acid house, and synth-pop. The lyrics describe a dream in which Björk wakes before her lover and throws objects off a cliff, watching them smash, before returning to their bed. She said this symbolised the parts of oneself that people give up to make relationships work.

"Hyperballad" was lauded by music critics, who considered it the best song of Björk's career at the time. It entered the charts in Finland, Australia, United States, Sweden, and the United Kingdom (where it was the last of three top ten hits from Post, after "Army of Me" and "It's Oh So Quiet"). The accompanying music video which was directed by Michel Gondry features a digitised Björk running and falling from a cliff.

Björk performed the song at the 1997 Tibetan Freedom Concert in New York, which was recorded by Sylvia Massy for Capitol Records. It was included on Tibetan Freedom Concert released later that year.

== Music ==
"Hyperballad" was written by Björk and co-produced by her and Nellee Hooper. The chords and lyrics in the verses move in three bar phrases; the choruses are in four bar phrases. It combines a house beat with a string section conducted by Brazilian musician Eumir Deodato. Heather Phares from AllMusic compared the song to Aphex Twin.

Lorraine Ali from Rolling Stone said that Björk "turns fantasy into morbid but honest wonderment for 'Hyperballad.' Here's what she sings over a sweeping, panoramic vista: 'I imagine what my body would sound like slamming against the rocks, and when it lands, will my eyes be closed or open?'"

== Lyrics ==
In the lyrics, Björk describes living at the top of a mountain and going to a cliff at sunrise. She throws objects off the edge while pondering her own suicide. The ritual allows her to exorcise darker thoughts and return to her partner. Björk stated that "I feel that words can have a mysticism or a hidden meaning. On 'Hyperballad', the idea that I'm throwing car parts from a cliff is about getting out my frustrations."

In an interview with David Hemingway, she elaborated: "I guess that song is about when you're in a relationship and it's going really well and you're really happy and maybe you have given up parts of yourself. To fall in love and be in a relationship for a long time is like giving a lot of parts of you away because the relationship becomes more important than you as individuals."

She also explained how the song relates to the hiding of an aggressive part of oneself from a lover.

Basically, 'Hyper-ballad' is about having this kind of bag going on and three years have passed and you're not high anymore. You have to make an effort consciously and nature's not helping you anymore. So you wake up early in the morning and you sneak outside and you do something horrible and destructive, break whatever you can find, watch a horrible film, read a bit of William Burroughs, something really gross and come home and be like, 'Hi honey, how are you?'

== Critical reception ==
"Hyperballad" was highly acclaimed by contemporary music critics. Mike Diver of BBC Music said "Hyper-Ballad – single four of six taken from this 11-tracker – is similarly striking [to "Army of Me"], and remains among the very finest songs in Björk’s canon [...] perfectly is an indelibly excellent example of music meeting art. It’s a benchmark of successful audio-visual synergy." Steve Baltin from Cash Box named it "Pick of the Week", noting that it "glistens with the dazzling light heartedness that characterizes the critically-hailed Post collection." He added, "With disco undercurrents beneath the strong pop grooves, "Hyper-Ballad" is a delightful track that all fans of quality music will enjoy. [...] Don't be surprised if this song becomes a club hit." Chuck Campbell from Knoxville News Sentinel found that the "humming, low-slung" track "is much darker as Bjork reveals an early morning ritual of throwing objects from a cliff and imagines taking the plunge herself." James Hyman from Music Week's RM Dance Update rated it 5 stars out of five, adding, "From day one, Bjork embraced dance culture, realising its importance in running parallel to the commercial release. 'Hyperballad' is icing on that cake". Another editor, James Hamilton, noted its "winsome caterwauling quirkiness". Also Eric Henderson from Slant Magazine was favorable, saying, "Without missing a beat, Björk puts herself into the role of fragile suicidist on "Hyper-Ballad," as she throws tchotchkes over a cliff to approximate the nature of her own plunge. A phenomenal journey, the track begins with lightly shuffling drum n' bass before expanding into an immense house groove."

Drowned In Sound listed it at number #8 on their top ten Björk singles. XFM Radio listed it at number 686 on their The XFM Top 1,000 Songs Of All Time. NME listed the song as the 69th best song of the 1990s, stating that "'Hyperballad' was an earnest attempt to try and make old love alive once more. She said it was about the art of "not forgetting about yourself" in a relationship and this was reflected in the music which altered from gentle folktronica to drum and bass-tinted acid house." Diffuser.fm described the song as "lush, sweeping cinematic synth-pop."

"Hyperballad" received the most votes from Björk fans in the survey for her Greatest Hits album's tracklist. In September 2022, Pitchfork named the second-best track of the decade on their "Top 200 Tracks of the 90s" list, behind Mariah Carey's "Fantasy (Bad Boy Remix)".

== Music video ==
During this scene, a three-dimensional shot of Björk lying amongst a mountainous landscape and she sings in a live video.

The music video for "Hyperballad" was directed by frequent collaborator Michel Gondry. It features Björk as a video game character who runs through an obscure, two-dimensional landscape of pylons before throwing herself off a cliff. This sequence, along with several others (including blinking lights and some of herself performing the song), are projected onto a three-dimensional shot of Björk lying amongst a mountainous landscape.

The video was filmed at Telecine Cell in London, using a motion control system. The entire video and all the effects were shot on a single 400 ft roll of film, by multiple exposure and frame-accurate backwinding of the film strip. The graphics were shot as a series of secondary exposures using a television monitor, and the flashing lights were created with an LED strip board, also exposed on the same piece of film. At Gondry's insistence, no edits were made after the film was exposed; the only post processing consisted of colour correction during the transfer to videotape.

Björk sings the verses live in the video. This new vocal take was later featured in the CD2 of the "Hyperballad" single, and in the 5.1 edition of Surrounded. Mike Diver from BBC Music gave it a positive review, saying "its accompanying video is a masterstroke of suggestive simplicity, evocative elegance; that it suits its skittering beats and contorting vocal [...]"

=== Reception ===
Music writer Carol Vernallis felt Gondry developed texture with an aesthetic that does not become "too coy or sickly sweet" by incorporating "a whiff of death"; pointing out that in the video, "Björk's head resembles a death mask". A reviewer, D File, wrote: "Due partially to my personal puzzlement in understanding this video and the construction of its imagery, I’ve concluded that 'Hyperballad' is, if nothing else, one of the most avant-garde pieces of music video in the late 20th century. At one glance, the composites completely coalesce with the elements of the song. Yet the imagery is so transcendent of any other pop promo. Upside, inside out."

Henry Keazor and Thorsten Wübbena considered that the clip "[has] taught us that electronic bodies are rather intangible, dematerialized, purer in a certain way." The music video, with its play on the boundaries between real and virtual, has been absorbed by club culture, as a representative of the scene's visual forms of expression.

Rick Poynor wrote that the video showcases "[Björk's commitment] to a 'techno' sensibility". Gondry and Björk—who have worked together continuously—"shared delight in playing interpretative games with her visual identity." He also said that the video demonstrated the musician's "[embrace of] the computer's shape-shifting powers."

== Track listing ==
These are the formats and track listings of major single releases of "Hyperballad".

- European CD single #1
1. "Hyperballad" (Radio Edit) – 3:58
2. "Cover Me" (Plaid Mix) – 5:24
- European CD single #2 /Australian/Japanese/Mexican CD single
1. "Hyperballad" (Radio Edit) – 4:01
2. "Hyperballad" (Robin Hood Riding Through the Glen Remix) – 6:31
3. "Hyperballad" (Disco Sync Mix) – 4:24
4. "Hyperballad" (Subtle Abuse Mix) – 6:54
- UK Cassette single
1. "Hyperballad" (Radio Edit) – 4:00
2. "Hyperballad" (Robin Hood Riding Through the Glen Mix) – 6:32
- UK CD single #1 / digital download #1
1. "Hyperballad" (Radio Edit) – 4:00
2. "Hyperballad" (Robin Hood Riding Through the Glen Remix) – 6:32
3. "Hyperballad" (The Stomp Mix) – 5:09
4. "Hyperballad" (The Hyperballad Fluke Mix) – 6:38
5. "Hyperballad" (Subtle Abuse Mix) – 6:56
6. "Hyperballad" (Tee's Freeze Mix) – 7:19
- UK CD single #2 / digital download #2
1. "Hyperballad" (Radio Edit) – 3:58
2. "Isobel" (The Carcass Remix) – 5:41
3. "Cover Me" (Plaid Mix) – 5:24
4. "Hyperballad" (Towa Tei Remix) – 8:12
- US CD single
1. "Hyperballad" (Radio Edit) – 3:58
2. "Hyperballad" (Robin Hood Riding Through the Glen Mix) – 6:29
3. "Hyperballad" (Subtle Abuse Mix) – 6:53
4. "Hyperballad" (Tee's Freeze Mix) – 7:19
5. "Hyperballad" (David Morales Classic Mix) – 9:10
6. "Hyperballad" (Towa Tei Choice Mix) – 8:13
- US 12" single
1. "Hyperballad" (David Morales Classic Mix) – 9:09
2. "Hyperballad" (Tee's Freeze Mix) – 7:18
3. "Hyperballad" (Disco Sync Mix) – 4:20
4. "Hyperballad" (Subtle Abuse Mix) – 6:53

== Charts ==
Chart (1996)	Peak position
Australia (ARIA)	31
Europe (Eurochart Hot 100)	71
Finland (Suomen virallinen lista)	18
Iceland (Íslenski Listinn Topp 40)	13
Israel (Israeli Singles Chart)	29
Netherlands (Dutch Top 40 Tipparade)	18
Netherlands (Dutch Single Tip)	14
Scottish Singles Sales (Official Charts)	15
Sweden (Sverigetopplistan)	34
UK Singles (Official Charts)	8
UK Airplay (Media Monitor)	60
UK Club Chart (Music Week)	14
UK Indie (Music Week)	1
US Dance Club Songs (Billboard)	1
US Dance Singles Sales (Billboard)	11

== Release history ==
Region	Date	Format(s)	Label(s)	Ref.
United Kingdom	12 February 1996	CD1; CD2; cassette	One Little Indian	
Japan	25 April 1996	CD	Mother; Polydor	

== Covers ==
In 2004, the Twilight Singers recorded a version of the song on the album She Loves You.

In 2008, Travis Sullivan's Björkestra recorded a version of the song on the album Enjoy, and again in 2013 on the album I Go Humble. The vocalist on both versions was Becca Stevens.

In 2010, Robyn performed a cover of the song at the Polar Music Prize ceremony, when Björk and Ennio Morricone were awarded the prize.

In 2014, Tori Amos covered the song during her Unrepentant Geraldines Tour.

In 2025, Yeah Yeah Yeahs covered the song during their Hidden in Pieces Tour, which was included on their live album Hidden in Pieces: Live at the Royal Albert Hall.
