= Bert Reisfeld =

Austrian lyricist (1906–1991)

Berthold Reisfeld (Vienna, 1906 - Badenweiler, 1991) was a lyricist, noted for adapting lyrics to well-known songs either to or from English. The songs he wrote English lyrics for include:

- "It's Oh So Quiet", adapted from the German song "Und Jetzt ist es Still" by Horst Winter,
- "The Three Bells", adapted from the French song "Les trois cloches" by Jean Villard
- "Baciare Baciare (Kissing Kissing)" by Dorothy Collins.

He also co-wrote the instrumental "Morning Mood" with Glenn Miller in 1941 as a trombone solo with piano accompaniment.

He also translated "These Boots Are Made for Walkin'" into the German "Die Stiefel Sind Zum Wandern" which was recorded by Eileen Goldsen.
