= It's Oh So Quiet =

1951 song by Betty Hutton

Song by Betty Hutton
- A-side: "Murder, He Says"
- Released: 1951
- Genre: Big band
- Length: 3:07
- Label: RCA
- Composer: Hans Lang
- Lyricist: Bert Reisfeld

"It's Oh So Quiet" is a song by American singer Betty Hutton, released in 1951 as the B-side to the single "Murder, He Says". It is a cover of the German song "Und jetzt ist es still", performed by Horst Winter in 1948, with music written by Austrian composer Hans Lang and German lyrics by Erich Meder. The English lyrics were written by Bert Reisfeld. A French title, "Tout est tranquille", was performed in 1949 by Ginette Garcin and the Jacques Hélian Orchestra.

Icelandic musician Björk covered the song as the third single from her second album Post (1995): it remains her biggest hit, reaching number four in the United Kingdom and spending 15 weeks on the UK Singles Chart.

In 2002, Brittany Murphy performed this song, joined by the Pussycat Dolls. In 2005, Lucy Woodward covered the song for the soundtrack for the film Ice Princess. This version was also used in the second trailer for the 2020 film Birds of Prey. A version of "It's Oh So Quiet" was used in a Maybelline advertisement, and a version by Amanda Fondell was used in an advertisement for Candy Crush Saga. Hutton's version was used in a commercial for the Acura TLX in 2020 and for Facebook in 2021. A version was used in a 2023 Diet Coke commercial. The trailer for Boy Kills World includes the song. In 2025, A version of the song was featured in Grey Goose’s “The Lastish Call” commercial starring Zoe Saldaña.

== Original ==
The original was sung by American Betty Hutton, released in 1951 as the B-side to the single "Murder, He Says". It is a cover of the German song "Und jetzt ist es still", performed by Horst Winter in 1948, with music written by Austrian composer Hans Lang and German lyrics by Erich Meder. The English lyrics were written by Bert Reisfeld. A French version, "Tout est tranquille", was performed in 1949 by Ginette Garcin and the Jacques Hélian Orchestra.

== Björk version ==
"It's Oh So Quiet"
- UK CD1 cover

Single by Björk

from the album Post
- B-side: "You've Been Flirting Again"; "Sweet Sweet Intuition"; "My Spine"
- Released: November 13, 1995
- Studio: Angel (London)
- Genre: Big band
- Length: 3:41
- Label: One Little Indian
- Songwriters: Hans Lang; Bert Reisfeld
- Producers: Björk; Nellee Hooper

Björk singles chronology
| "Isobel" (1995) | "It's Oh So Quiet" (1995) | "Hyperballad" (1996) |

Music video
- "It's Oh So Quiet" on YouTube

The song was covered by Icelandic musician Björk in 1995. It was released in November that year, by One Little Indian, as the third single from her second album, Post (1995) and remains her biggest hit, reaching number four in the UK and spending 15 weeks on the UK Singles Chart. Fueled by the Spike Jonze-directed music video, the single also shot Björk into the spotlight in Australia, where it reached number six. In the United Kingdom, the single has been certified as gold, having shipped 400,000 copies.

=== Critical reception ===
James Masterton for Dotmusic said Björk's version of "It's Oh So Quiet" "stands out as one of the most bizarre singles she has ever recorded." He described it "as Icelandic pixie meets the sound of Frank Sinatra to almost perfect effect." Alan Jones from Music Week wrote, "Alternating soft and gentle passages with noisy outbursts on which Bjork squawks and is reinforced by an old-fashioned big band section, this is very much a novelty, but one that works and well." Pan-European magazine Music & Media stated, "The big-band-backed 'It's Oh So Quiet' is wonderful (didn't we hear this in Altman's Pret-A-Porter? It isn't included on the soundtrack album)."

Simon Williams from NME said in his review of Post, "It happens about a quarter of the way into 'It's Oh So Quiet'. All is normal in Björkland in terms of mischievous whisperings and wandering noises for the first, ooooh, minute... and then, with nary a mumbled warning, out pours a 20-piece orchestral shriek, the huge scarlet drapes part insolently, and there She is centrestage, gallivanting down the crystallised staircase, shimmying with the choreographed puffins, bellowing through a jazz-tastic wartime standard originally recorded by a Hollywood bombshell of the blonde variety, Betty Hutton, and She is hollering You fall in love, ZING BOOM! The sky up above, ZING BOOM! Is caving in, WOW BAM!."

In her review of the single, Gill Whyte from Smash Hits gave it a top score of five out of five, writing, "Uh-oh! Bjönkers is back! With a loonier-than-the-looniest-thing-ever-loonied choon! So, put on your loon shoes and tip-tappety-tap along, 'cos this is a redoing of an old Hollywood musical big band number, with lots of big, bursty, brassy noises, interludes of quiet Ssh, ssh gurglings, and, just when you think it's all over, the Pixie From Planet Shouty screams her wee head off. Literally! Oh-so brilliant." Another Smash Hits editor, Gavin Reeve, named it one of two "top destinations" of the album, with "Army of Me".

=== Music video ===
The music video for Björk's "It's Oh So Quiet" is the work of American director Spike Jonze, and a homage to Hollywood musicals. Time Out wrote, "none of [it] would have worked without that final crane shot" (depicted above).

The music video, directed by Spike Jonze, was shot in San Fernando Valley, California. It is a homage to Hollywood's Technicolor musicals that drew inspiration from Busby Berkeley and Jacques Demy's The Umbrellas of Cherbourg, as well as Taiwanese director Tsai Ming-liang. Like Demy, Jonze "mines the magical from the mundane," as he transforms a drab auto shop into the location where Björk dances and sings with a full dance company, an attempt to reflect the "exuberance" of her vocal performance. The whispered verse sections of the track are filmed in slow motion, "much as Tsai's cinematography takes place over an extended timeframe"; while the shouted musical sections "reflect back on ordinary or 'lived' reality in a manner that denaturalizes the banal—turning it, more than the fantasy of musical spectacle, into something surreal." The music video premiered on MTV during the week ending on August 20, 1995.

==== Synopsis ====
The video begins as Björk emerges from an extremely dirty washroom in an auto shop. She dances along with the auto workers for the first chorus, then emerges from the shop. During the second chorus, she dances tap with a few people outside of the auto shop. Björk continues to walk along the street, dancing with several elderly women and their umbrellas before settling to rest her arms on top of a mailbox for the final verse. The mailbox comes alive and dances along with Björk during this chorus. Björk then runs down the street and into the road, where the rest of the town has decided to join her for one large dance number. The video ends with Björk floating up above the townsfolk and hushing the viewer.

==== Awards ====
The "It's Oh So Quiet" video received six nominations for the MTV Video Music Awards for 1996 including Best Female Video, Best Art Direction, Breakthrough Video, Best Direction in a Video, International Viewer's Choice Award — MTV Europe, and Best Choreography in a Video, winning in the latter category. The video was also nominated for a Grammy Award for Best Music Video - Short Form, losing to "Scream" by Michael Jackson and his sister Janet. In October 2007, MuchMoreMusic placed "It's Oh So Quiet" as number eight of the Top 40 Most Memorable Music Videos on Listed.

=== Track listings ===
- UK CD1
1. "It's Oh So Quiet"
2. "You've Been Flirting Again" (Flirt Is a Promise Mix)
3. "Hyperballad" (Over the Edge Mix)
4. "Sweet Sweet Intuition"
- UK CD2, Australian and Japanese CD single
1. "It's Oh So Quiet"
2. "Hyperballad" (Brodsky Quartet version)
3. "Hyperballad" (Girls Blouse Mix)
4. "My Spine"
- UK and Australian cassette single, European CD single
1. "It's Oh So Quiet"
2. "You've Been Flirting Again" (Flirt Is a Promise Mix)
- US CD and cassette single
1. "It's Oh So Quiet"
2. "You've Been Flirting Again" (Icelandic mix)

=== Charts ===
==== Weekly charts ====
| Chart (1995–1996) | Peak position |
|---|---|
| Australia (ARIA) | 6 |
| Belgium (Ultratop 50 Flanders) | 28 |
| Belgium (Ultratop 50 Wallonia) | 20 |
| Europe (Eurochart Hot 100) | 18 |
| Europe (European Hit Radio) | 21 |
| Finland (Suomen virallinen lista) | 5 |
| Iceland (Íslenski Listinn Topp 40) | 1 |
| Ireland (IRMA) | 7 |
| Israel (Israeli Singles Chart) | 16 |
| Netherlands (Dutch Top 40) | 25 |
| Netherlands (Single Top 100) | 19 |
| New Zealand (Recorded Music NZ) | 20 |
| Scottish Singles Sales (Official Charts) | 4 |
| Sweden (Sverigetopplistan) | 29 |
| UK Singles (Official Charts) | 4 |
| UK Airplay (Music Week) | 9 |
| UK Indie (Music Week) | 1 |
| US Alternative (Radio & Records) | 48 |
| US Bubbling Under Hot 100 (Billboard) | 9 |

| Chart (2011) | Peak position |
|---|---|
| France (SNEP) | 57 |

==== Year-end charts ====
| Chart (1995) | Position |
|---|---|
| Iceland (Íslenski Listinn Topp 40) | 43 |
| UK Singles (OCC) | 26 |

| Chart (1996) | Position |
|---|---|
| Australia (ARIA) | 61 |
| Iceland (Íslenski Listinn Topp 40) | 97 |

=== Certifications ===
| Region | Certification | Certified units/sales |
|---|---|---|
| United Kingdom (BPI) | Gold | 400,000^{^} |
^{^} Shipments figures based on certification alone.

=== Release history ===
| Region | Date | Format(s) | Label(s) | Ref. |
|---|---|---|---|---|
| United Kingdom | November 13, 1995 | CD1; CD2; cassette | One Little Indian | |
| Australia | November 20, 1995 | CD; cassette | Mother; Polydor | |
| Japan | December 21, 1995 | CD | Mother; Polydor | |
