= Surrounded (Björk album) =

Box set by Björk
- Released: 27 June 2006
- Label: One Little Indian

Björk chronology
Drawing Restraint 9 (2005)	Surrounded (2006)	Volta (2007)

Surrounded is the third box set by Icelandic musician Björk, released on 27 June 2006 through One Little Indian. It is a collection of seven of her studio albums, issued in the DualDisc format—one side contains the original longplayers, while the other one includes their remastered versions in surround sound, in tandem with music videos and additional features. While the box set did not impact any record charts, music critics gave mixed to positive reviews to Surrounded. Most of them were positive towards its packaging and affirmed it was an effective showcase of Björk's catalogue. Nonetheless, criticism was targeted towards its opportunistic nature and technicalities.

== Content and release ==
Surrounded compiles reissues of five of Björk's studio albums—Debut (1993), Post (1995), Homogenic (1997), Vespertine (2001) and Medúlla (2004)—in addition to Selmasongs (2000), and Drawing Restraint 9 (2005), her soundtrack albums. They are pressed in DualDiscs, which possess both a CD side and a DVD side. The former contains each album as originally released, whereas they appear remastered in both DTS and Dolby 5.1 on the latter. Paul 'P-Dub' Walton was the project's sound engineer, having been responsible for the remasters. Ken Richardson of Sound and Vision described Walton's work on the box set as a "truly surrounding mix", adding it provides "authority" to Björk's "fragile" voice, while making "the icy electronics warm up in the newly expansive atmosphere." The DVD sides incorporate the music videos of each album's singles, the exceptions being the discs for Selmasongs and Drawing Restraint 9 do not include any visuals, but the latter features an extra track—"Petrolatum". (Note: In addition to their audio counterpart: the Debut disc contains videos for "Human Behaviour", "Venus as a Boy", "Play Dead", "Big Time Sensuality" and "Violently Happy"; the Post disc contains videos for "Army of Me", "Isobel", "It's Oh So Quiet", "Hyperballad", "Possibly Maybe" and "I Miss You"; the Homogenic disc contains videos for "Jóga", "Bachelorette", "Hunter", "Alarm Call" and "All Is Full of Love"; the Vespertine disc contains videos for "Hidden Place", "Pagan Poetry", "Cocoon", "It's in Our Hands" and "Nature is Ancient"; the Medúlla disc contains videos for "Who Is It", "Triumph of a Heart", "Desired Constellation", "Where Is the Line" and "Oceania".) The collection is bundled in M/M Paris-designed "hot metallic pink packaging", which Kurt Orzeck of MTV says "is a work of art in and of itself", and Mark Pytlik characterised as a continuation of Björk's "fetishization of the physical artifact". The albums are accompanied by their original artwork. Surrounded was released in the United Kingdom on 27 June 2006; its components were also made available individually.

== Critical reception ==
Professional ratings
Review scores
Source	Rating
AllMusic	4/5 stars
The Austin Chronicle	3/5 stars
The Buffalo News	4/4 stars
Entertainment Weekly	(positive)
Global Rhythm	(mixed)
The Oklahoman	(positive)
Pitchfork Media	(5.9/10)
The San Diego Union-Tribune	3.5/5 stars
San Francisco Chronicle	(Good)
Spin	4/5 stars

Surrounded elicited mixed to positive reviews from music critics. George Lang, writing in The Oklahoman, recommended the boxset to fans of Björk, commending its inclusion of the artist's videography. On behalf of the San Francisco Chronicle, Aidin Vaziri praised the sound quality and packaging, but was ambivalent towards the collection's price and opined that the "quality of the music is wildly inconsistent". Sound and Vision evaluated the sound of the remasters positively; according to reviewer Ken Richardson, they are "never less than excellent". Although he drew praise to the bonus features, he noted the "static" menus of the DVDs. The San Diego Union-Tribune found it suitable for "completists with high-end audio gear"; The Buffalo News said the boxset "should help put this clearly brilliant artist in both proper context and proper light." Ryan Dombal of Entertainment Weekly assessed it as a "luxurious treat" and reckoned it "revitalizes some of the most ambitious pop music of the last 13 years", despite finding the compendium antithetical to Björk's "relevant" status. The remasters of Vespertine and Medúlla were singled out in the review.

Heather Phares of AllMusic described the boxset as "beautifully packaged" and practical, whereas The Austin Chronicle reviewer Melanie Haupt denoted the technical problems adjacent to the DualDisc, stating, "The work and its evolution speaks for itself. (...) Too bad the hardware doesn't." Mark Pytlik's review for Pitchfork Media contextualized Surrounded in a flurry of Björk releases. He stated it is not worth purchasing, adding that "she's pretty much guaranteed to come back with another one that's bigger and better in a few years' time anyway." Global Rhythm's Jeff Tamarkin viewed the inclusion of "the more sonically pedestrian original recordings" as unnecessary, complimenting the remasters and videos.

== Release history ==
Country/Region	Date	Label	Format	Cat. No.	Ref.
United Kingdom	June 24, 2006	One Little Indian	7×DualDisc	TPLP 730CDBOX	
