= Vespertine (album) =

Studio album by Björk
- Released: 18 August 2001
- Recorded: 1999–2001
- Studios: El Cortijo, (San Pedro de Alcántara, Spain); Olympic, (London, UK); Avatar, (New York City); Master Sound Astoria, (New York City); Quad, (New York City); Sear Sound, (New York City); Magic Shop, (New York City); The Loft on Lafayette Street, (New York City); Looking Glass, (New York City); Greenhouse, (Reykjavík, Iceland); Thule, (Reykjavík, Iceland); The Hit Factory (New York City)
- Genres: Art pop; glitch pop; electronica; folktronica; ambient
- Length: 55:39
- Labels: One Little Indian; Elektra
- Producers: Björk; Thomas Knak; Martin Gretschmann; Marius de Vries

Björk chronology
Selmasongs (2000)	Vespertine (2001)	Greatest Hits (2002)

Singles from Vespertine
- 1. "Hidden Place" Released: 30 July 2001; 2. "Pagan Poetry" Released: 5 November 2001; 3. "Cocoon" Released: 11 March 2002

Vespertine is the fourth studio album by Icelandic recording artist Björk. (Note: Vespertine is officially considered to be her fourth solo album. It is Björk's fifth solo studio album if her 1977 juvenilia self-titled release is taken into account. The album can also be considered as sixth, adding Gling-Gló to the count, a 1990 collaboration with Tríó Guðmundar Ingólfssonar.) It was first released on 18 August 2001 in Japan by One Little Indian Records and 27 August 2001 in the United States by Elektra Entertainment. Björk aspired to create an album with minimal and intricate electronic music to evoke an intimate and domestic feeling, in contrast with the louder styles of her previous studio album Homogenic (1997). She enlisted producers such as Opiate, Console and the duo Matmos, and also worked with harpist Zeena Parkins. Production on the album began while filming her role in Dancer in the Dark.

Björk composed arrangements with thin-sounding instruments, including the harp, the celesta, clavichord, strings and custom music boxes. Assisted by Matmos, Björk created "microbeats" from various commonplace sounds, such as that of shuffling cards and ice being cracked. Lyrically, the album drew inspiration from Björk's new relationship with Matthew Barney, exploring themes related to sex, intimacy, eroticism, and love. Other lyrical sources include the poetry of E. E. Cummings and British playwright Sarah Kane's Crave. Three singles were released from Vespertine: "Hidden Place", "Pagan Poetry", and "Cocoon". The music videos of the latter two were banned on MTV for their depictions of sexuality. Björk embarked on the Vespertine world tour with Parkins, Matmos, and a choir of Inuit women, where they performed at theatres and small venues in favor of acoustics.

The album peaked at number 19 on the US Billboard 200 selling 75,000 copies in its first week and at number 8 on the UK Albums Chart. It was certified gold in Canada, France, and the United Kingdom. Noted for its erotic, intimate mood and sonic experimentation, Vespertine received universal acclaim from music critics, with some considering it Björk's best album to date. The album appeared on several publications' lists of the best albums of 2001 and of the decade, and has been evaluated by many critics to be one of the best albums of all time.

== Conceptualisation ==
Björk had released her previous studio album, Homogenic, in 1997. The album's style differed from her previous two releases, described by her as "very emotionally confrontational and [...] very dramatic". She also described "All Is Full of Love"—Homogenic's closing track—as the first song on Vespertine, as it opposed the rest of the album's "aggressive, macho" aesthetic. Writer and critic Mark Pytlik writes, "Her appetite for thumping techno had been, temporarily at least, subsumed by a desire for stark melodies and minimalist production". In 2000, she starred in Lars von Trier's Dancer in the Dark, and composed its soundtrack, Selmasongs. While she worked on the film, she also began producing her next album, writing new music, and teaming with new collaborators. She has said "Selmasongs was the day job and Vespertine was the hobby". During this time, she also began to use her new laptop to write music, and Vespertine has been retrospectively referred to as "her laptop album".

"Domestica"
Sample of the song Domestica, which was part of Björk's initial album concept about everyday life.

She initially set about making a record with a domestic mood featuring "everyday moods and everyday noises translating into melodies and beats", hence its working title Domestika. Marius de Vries told Sound on Sound that the project was driven by an "overriding aesthetic of being homely and comfortable", which had "all to do with Björk wanting to make a record as a reaction to the wanderings and the pain she experienced making Dancer in the Dark… [and coming back] after you've wandered." Björk's initial idea was also to "celebrat[e] the banalities of everyday life." For example, the title track "Domestica", originally titled "Lost Keys", was meant to be a "gentle, humorous snapshot" of Björk looking for her keys.

Her new relationship with artist Matthew Barney, and the stress she experienced while filming Dancer in the Dark, have been referred to as the two major forces that shaped what would become Vespertine. Her relationship with Barney influenced her lyrics, which became more intimate, detailed, and revealing in contrast to her past works. As Björk had to be extroverted during the filming process, the music she wrote for Vespertine also became hushed and tranquil as a way for her to escape.

The eventual title change of the record reveals its changing nature. Writer and critic Mark Pytlik notes that, "where [Domestika] signified a focus of extracting magic from the platitudes of everyday life, [Vespertine] [...] suggested a creation of magic through much more powerful forces. In fine style, Björk had set out to write an album about making sandwiches. (Note: Referring to a 2001 interview with NME, during which Björk stated "This is [...] music for the home. It's corny to make a soundtrack for making a sandwich, but I quite like it.") She'd ended up with an album about making love". A stylistic antecedent was her poem "Techno Prayer", published in Details magazine in July 1996, which would later be used as part of the lyrics of "All Neon Like". It featured thematic ideas such as cocooning and thread-weaving that she would later explore on Vespertine.

== Recording ==
The earliest sessions took place in Spain with programmer Jake Davies. Björk commissioned Valgeir Sigurðsson to relocate some of his studio equipment from Iceland to Denmark where Dancer in the Dark was being filmed. While living in Copenhagen, she also contacted the electronic musician Thomas Knak (also known as Opiate), after having enjoyed his 1999 album Objects for an Ideal Home.

In Iceland, programmers Jake Davies and Marius de Vries joined Björk for a writing session, laying down more tracks, in addition to nine already mixed. Then, she "set up camp [...] during summer" in a New York City loft, and began to work with harpist Zeena Parkins. Much of Vespertine was "composed, crafted and edited" in that loft, in what has been called the "Domestika sessions". Some tracks were recorded as an overdub "on top of a slave mixdown" of the Spanish sessions.

"Undo" was written during a two-week session with Knak that January in Reykjavík. Björk recorded her vocals on top of Knak's minimalist rhythmic backbone, and months later she had added a full choir and string section. "Cocoon", also produced by Knak, was one of the last songs to be written for the album; its melody suddenly came to Björk and she contacted him. Knak took it as a chance to make a more minimal track, similar to his own releases.

"Heirloom" was based on an existing instrumental track from electronic musician Console's album Rocket in the Pocket (1998), titled "Crabcraft" (which itself samples Orchestral Manoeuvres in the Dark's "Sacred Heart"). Björk contacted Console in early 2000 and they met in London; she then added her vocals on top. During this period, Björk also worked with Bogdan Raczynski on the song "Who Is It", but it did not make the final cut and was subsequently re-recorded for the album Medúlla. Björk said that she worked on Vespertine for three years.

== Instrumentation ==
As she wanted to write her own songs on music boxes, Björk contacted a music box company requesting transparent acrylic boxes because she wanted the sound to be "as hard as possible, like it was frozen". Björk decided to use sounds that would not be compromised when downloaded from sites such as Napster, such as "microbeat[s]", whispered vocals, the harp, music box, celeste, clavichord, and strings which "ended up being more panoramic textures in the background." For the string and music box arrangements, she used Sibelius scorewriter software.

For Vespertine, Björk wanted to make a "microcosmos of thirty or forty beats interacting". To do this, she recorded noises around her house to make beats out of them. Once the songs were almost finished, Björk contacted the duo Matmos, who she considered "virtuosos" in the field, and sent them various songs to work with. They added beats made from the noise of crushing ice and shuffling cards, among others. In her documentary Minuscule, Björk explained that this process consisted of "taking something very tiny and magnifying it up to big", intending to convey the "sensation that you've been told a secret", that is also present in micrographs. Marius de Vries and Björk did much of the sound design on Vespertine with a text-based synthesizer called SuperCollider. De Vries said that typing in commands as opposed to using knobs, "take[s] you in surprising directions." Additionally, Knak used an Ensoniq ASR-10, for "Cocoon".

== Composition ==
"The Björkian soundfield is much as it always is: skittering rhythms, warm keyboard tones, discreet "laptronic" pulses, plinking harps and swooshing strings, a general meshing of organic and synthetic textures. But her unique sonic palette is harnessed here in the service of hushed awe: womblike intimacy and occasional ecstasy."

— Wondering Sound describing the sound of Vespertine.

Björk has stated that she wanted the album to sound like "modern chamber music", referring to the times where "the most ideal music situation was in the home, where people would play harps for each other". She also considers Vespertine to be the opposite of her previous studio album Homogenic, the former being an introverted, quiet, winter record; the latter a loud, dramatic, summer record. Björk has also described the album as "more electronic folk music".

Critics have classified Vespertine as electronica, art pop, psychedelia, ambient, folktronica, and glitch pop. Music journalists have also noted the experimental nature of the record. The Orlando Weekly wrote that with the album, Björk "[took] her modernist art-pop further into the abstract". According to Joseph Hale of Tiny Mix Tapes, described Vespertine's music as a combination of "psychedelic techno, chamber music, and chorale together into modal constructions that swelled and receded like emotions (or psilocybin)". David Fricke of Rolling Stone wrote "Vespertine is the closest any pop-vocal album has come to the luxuriant Zen of the new minimalist techno". Björk's performance on Vespertine has been described as that of an "art-rock torch singer".

Stylistically, Vespertine incorporates elements of both art and dance music. For example, the instrumentation of choir, strings, and harp is suggestive of Romantic art music, while the "synthesised keyboard sonorities, filtering effects and complex percussive sounds" are elements characteristic of dance-based pop. Academic Nicola Dibben wrote that its "classical and dance-based elements" combine "the spiritual and the sensual" allusions of the album.

Vespertine is also characterised by "the obsession with sonic traces of analog technology – that is, the pervasive use of loops, static and white noise". Unlike previous albums like Debut and Post, "electronic sounds are the norm, and the acoustic sounds become the interjections." Influenced by the 1999 album New Ancient Strings, a recording of kora duets by Toumani Diabaté with Ballaké Sissoko, (Note: Although Vespertine does not feature kora, Björk would later collaborate with Toumani Diabaté on the track "Hope" from her 2007 album Volta.) Björk said she "messed up the sound of too angelic instruments, like the harp or the glockenspiel" on Vespertine. Björk's voice is used as a supplement to "the complex electronic textures". Her vocals often appear to be recorded close to the microphone and with little treatment, and sung in a sometimes "unstable whisper", conveying a sense of close proximity and reduced space suitable for the intimate lyrics.

== Songs ==
=== Tracks 1–6 ===
"Hidden Place"
Written and produced by Björk, "Hidden Place" features "sweeping string arrangements and a musique concrète percussion style", a representative of the album's sound.

The album opens with "Hidden Place", which features a soprano section and strings, "over the top of a warm, intimate melody". Michael Hubbard of musicOMH felt the track was reminiscent of Homogenic's "Hunter", but less focused on the beats. NME called it progressive folk, while Drowned in Sound wrote it was electro. Björk sings about "how two people can create a paradise just by uniting", as she intones: "I'm so close to tears/And so close to/Simply calling you up/And simply suggesting/We go to that hidden place". "Cocoon" is "based around an exploratory bassline and beats that sound like fingertips on skin". Discussing the glitch nature of the track, Björk said, "when you take technology and use the areas where it breaks, where it's faulty, you're entering a mystery zone where you can't control it". Lyrically revolving around making love, the song alternates between metaphors like "Who would have known/That a boy like him/Would have entered me lightly/Restoring my blisses", and explicit lines such as "He slides inside/Half awake, half asleep" and "Gorgeousness/He's still inside me". Björk sings a breathy, "whispered, near-cracking falsetto" on the track.

"It's Not Up to You" has been described as a "dizzying ballad" and a song that lifts the album upward. Michael Paoletta of Billboard described the track as "melancholy". Its lyrics are about "love for the unknown devices that culminate in 'perfect days'", and "pleas to find beauty in unlikely places". The "caressing lyrics" of "Undo" assure that: "It's not meant to be a strife/It's not meant to be a struggle uphill". Biographer Mark Pytlik wrote that "Undo" is "a reassuring reminder that anything can happen once you let it. If you are in pain, undo it, Björk suggests, no hint of disingenuousness in her voice, over climbing strings and a rising choir". "Pagan Poetry" is a "harp-splashed" song that concerns unrequited love. The track builds slowly, "with Björk wailing over swelling keyboard crescendos", until, at the four-minute mark, "all the music drops away, leaving Björk utterly exposed" as she sings "I love him, I love him/I love him, I love him/I love him, I love him". The song also features "a flotilla of music boxes with an Asian-teahouse touch". The instrumental interlude "Frosti" has been described as "metallic tundra". Its sound stems from a music box, creating an intimate, fairy tale-like effect.

=== Tracks 7–12 ===
"Frosti" fades into "Aurora", while "a warm, faintly crunchy sound" is heard. These are samples of footsteps in the snow—the work of Matmos—re-appropriated as the song's "subtly shifting beat". "Aurora" has been described as "something that appeals to a child-like imagination", and having a "magical and airy quality". In the lyrics, she addresses a Nature goddess, and sings about "literally dissolving with pleasure" as she "prays to become one with… the northern lights". One of Björk's broodiest compositions, "An Echo, a Stain" is underpinned by a creeping choir line and nibbling clicks, and features an "unresolved, ominous tension" that is atypical of her writing style. Most of the song's lyrics speak directly to incidents in Sarah Kane's 1998 dark-themed play Crave, so much so that it was titled "Crave" up to the last minute. "Sun in My Mouth" is an adaptation of E. E. Cummings' poem "I will wade out/Till my thighs are steeped in burning flowers", with an emphasis on the vocal and accompaniment provided by a string orchestra, a harp, and soft electronica. The track's lyrics have been considered a "startling allusion to masturbation", positioned "within the fantasy-like imagery of burning flowers, sea-girls, darkness and the sun".

"Heirloom" alters "between what sounds like a samba preset on a vintage Wurlitzer organ and skittering breakbeats, and is decorated with inverted synthtones and analog keyboards". The song's lyrics tell a "fuzzy story" about a recurring dream, while "[likening] the art of singing to swallowing and exhaling 'glowing lights'" as Björk sings: "During the night/They do a trapeze walk/Until they're in the sky/Right above my bed". Film director Harmony Korine wrote "Harm of Will"'s lyrics. The Slate album review noted the minimalist nature of the track, pointing out a lack of hook, beat and melody. It is a slow song, as is the closing track, "Unison". The latter "[contains] a refrain directly inspired by [Björk's] experience in Dancer in the Dark and a healthy dollop of self-effacing humor evoked to counter the balance". It "brings beats and strings together in a final crescendo that also manages to incorporate a little jungle".

== Artwork ==
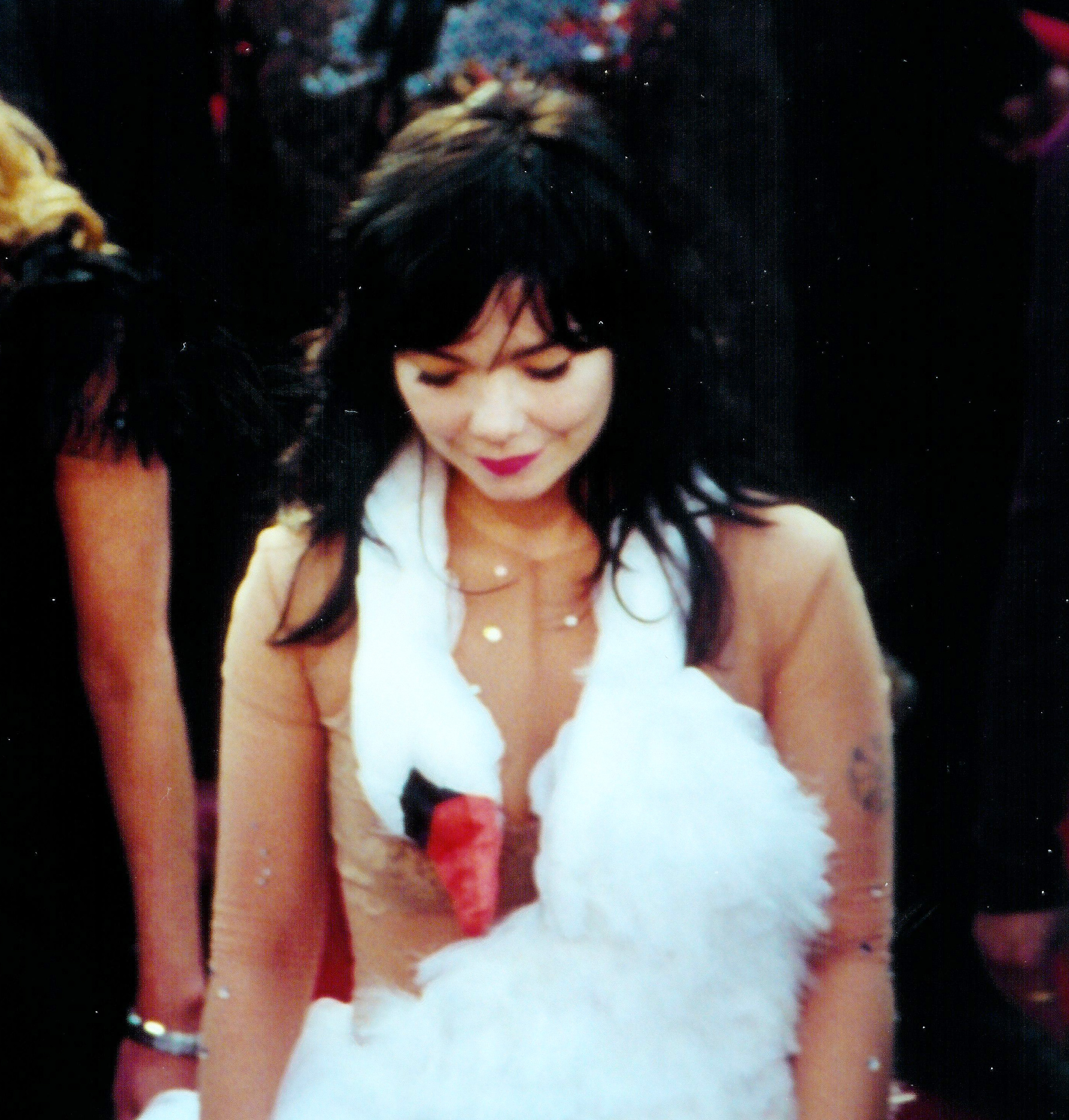
Björk wearing her swan dress at the 73rd Academy Awards

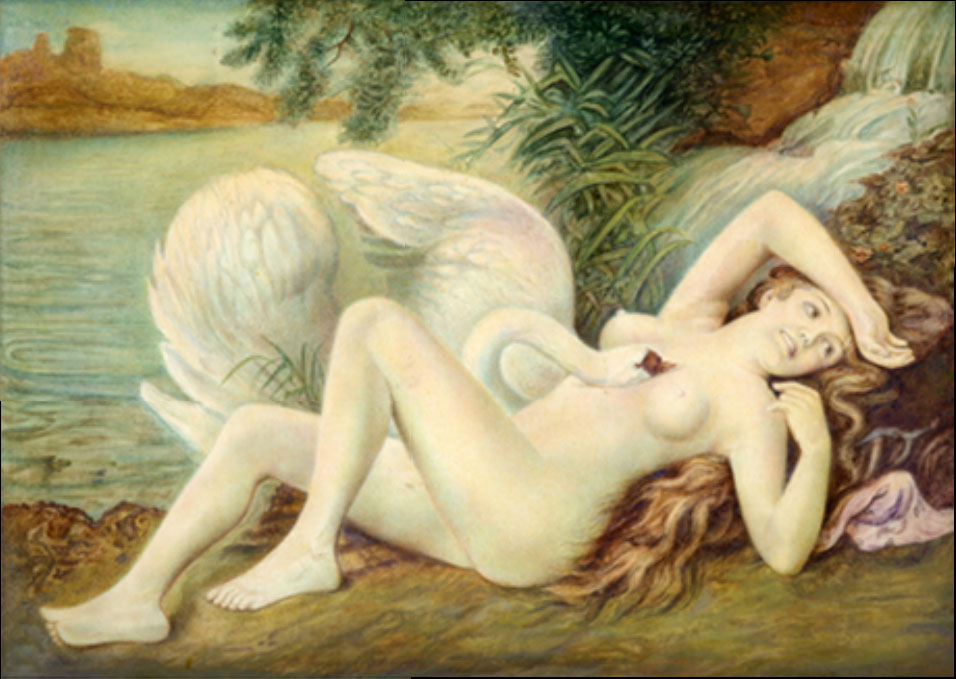
Vespertine's artwork and promotion had been compared to the mythical story of Leda and the Swan

The cover art, shot by Inez van Lamsweerde and Vinoodh Matadin in Los Angeles, California, is a black and white photograph of Björk lying down on the patterned ground next to a swimming pool, covering her eyes from the sun and wearing the Marjan Pejoski swan dress that she wore at the 73rd Academy Awards in 2001, (Note: Björk wrote the song "I've Seen It All" for Dancer in the Dark and was nominated for Best Original Song) which caused a media frenzy and was widely criticised.

The duo M/M (Paris), known for applying and integrating their work on photographs (so called dessin dans l'image, or "drawings in the picture"), illustrated the cover, featuring a swan and the album's title with feathers. Björk thought swans embodied Vespertine's music, describing them as "a white, sort of winter bird" and "very romantic". Vespertine came with a booklet of M/M (Paris) artwork. Michael Hubbard of musicOMH commented, "the spine of the CD is entirely white, while the rest of the sleeve features innovative photography and artwork". Academic Nicola Dibben has likened Vespertine's artwork and promotion to representations of the Greek myth of Leda and the Swan, emphazising the erotic overtones of both.

== Release and promotion ==
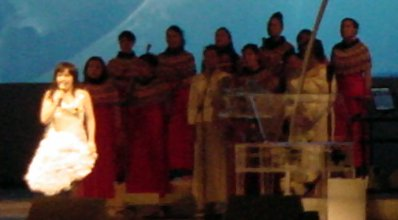
Björk performing during the Vespertine world tour at New York's Radio City Music Hall.

Vespertine was released later than One Little Indian Records had intended. Originally, the album's release was scheduled for May, but by March it had been put back to August, so as to enable Björk to work on the album's promotion. On 22 May 2001, Björk premiered six songs off the new album in an intimate concert at the Riverside Church in New York City, accompanied by Matmos and Zeena Parkins. Vespertine was released on 27 August, as a double 12" record, CD and compact cassette. To coincide with the release of the album, Björk also released an eponymously titled coffee table book, created by her and edited and designed by M/M (Paris). A second single, Towards the end of 2001, Vespertine was released as a DVD-Audio. The music videos for "Hidden Place", "Pagan Poetry" and "Cocoon" were included in the DVDs Volumen Plus (2002) and Greatest Hits – Volumen 1993–2003 (2002).

=== Appearances ===
Together, Elektra, and New York-based independent marketing firm Drill Team, created the Björk Vespertine Syndicate (BVS), a group of 30-plus websites that had exclusive access to non-album tracks, music videos, and concert/rehearsal footage. To promote the album, Björk appeared in various magazines in mid-2001, including: The Fader, Q, Pulse, URB, USA Today, InStyle, Vibe, Us, Nylon, Index, CMJ New Music Monthly and, Spin. Magazines Dazed & Confused and Les Inrockuptibles featured a special issue with texts, photographs, and different CDs issued randomly, each with a different song from the album. The Times issued a Björk special, featuring videos, music, photographs, and a competition to see Björk perform. She also appeared on several TV shows, including: The Rosie O'Donnell Show, The Tonight Show with Jay Leno, Space Ghost Coast to Coast, The David Letterman Show and, Charlie Rose, among others.

== Singles ==
=== Hidden Place ===
On 6 August 2001, "Hidden Place" was released as the album's lead single, its music video having premiered in July. It was released as two CDs and a DVD, featuring B-sides "Generous Palmstroke", "Foot Soldier", "Mother Heroic" and "Verandi".

The music video for "Hidden Place" was directed by Inez van Lamsweerde and Vinoodh Matadin and co-directed by M/M (Paris). It was shot in London over four days in February 2001. It was originally planned for a song from Selmasongs, but Björk felt the project was more appropriate for Vespertine. The video consists of close-up shots panning around Björk's face, as fluids flow in and out of her facial orifices. M/M (Paris) said that they "wanted to get as close to her as we could, as we all felt she had never been portrayed as the 'real' and beautiful woman she is.", and that the fluids in the video "visualiz[e] all possible emotions pulsating and circulating in her very busy brain.

=== Pagan Poetry ===
The controversial music video for "Pagan Poetry", directed by Nick Knight, features highly stylised images of unsimulated sex, going in hand with Vespertine's central theme of eroticism and intimacy.

"Pagan Poetry", was released on 5 November 2001 as two CDs and a DVD, featuring a remix by Matthew Herbert, "Domestica", "Batabid", an Opiate remix of "Aurora", and the music video for "Pagan Poetry".

Nick Knight, who had previously shot the cover art for Homogenic, directed the music video for "Pagan Poetry". It is about a woman preparing herself for marriage and for her lover, as she sews a wedding dress onto her skin. As she had asked him to make a video about her love life, Knight gave Björk a camcorder and asked her to shoot her own private scenes. Shots of skin being pierced were also recorded with this camera; the people being pierced were five women who "were into subculture and piercings" and Björk herself, who only pierced her ear. This first two-thirds of the video contains a great deal of post-production by Peter Marin, who gave the image its abstract watercolor-like effect. The shots of Björk with her Alexander McQueen topless wedding dress were filmed in super 35 format. The main idea behind the music video was: "to do something with the moving image that was a mirror of what was happening musically". Although the music video has been well received by critics, it was highly controversial and banned from MTV in 2001.

=== Cocoon ===
"Cocoon", the album's third single, was released on 11 March 2002. Its music video had premiered in February. Once again, the single was released as two separate CDs and a DVD, with "Pagan Poetry", "Sun in My Mouth" and "Amphibian" as B-sides.

The music video for "Cocoon" was directed by Eiko Ishioka and was shot in April 2001 in New York City. One of Björk's most avant-garde music videos, it: "plays with minimalist white for both costume and bleached eyebrows, treating Björk as a geisha whose makeup extends over her entire nude body". Red threads emerge from her nipples and circulate between her breasts and nose, finally enveloping her in a cocoon. Björk actually wore a very close-fitting body suit. Although not as controversial as the "Pagan Poetry" music video, it was still banned from MTV.

== Tour ==
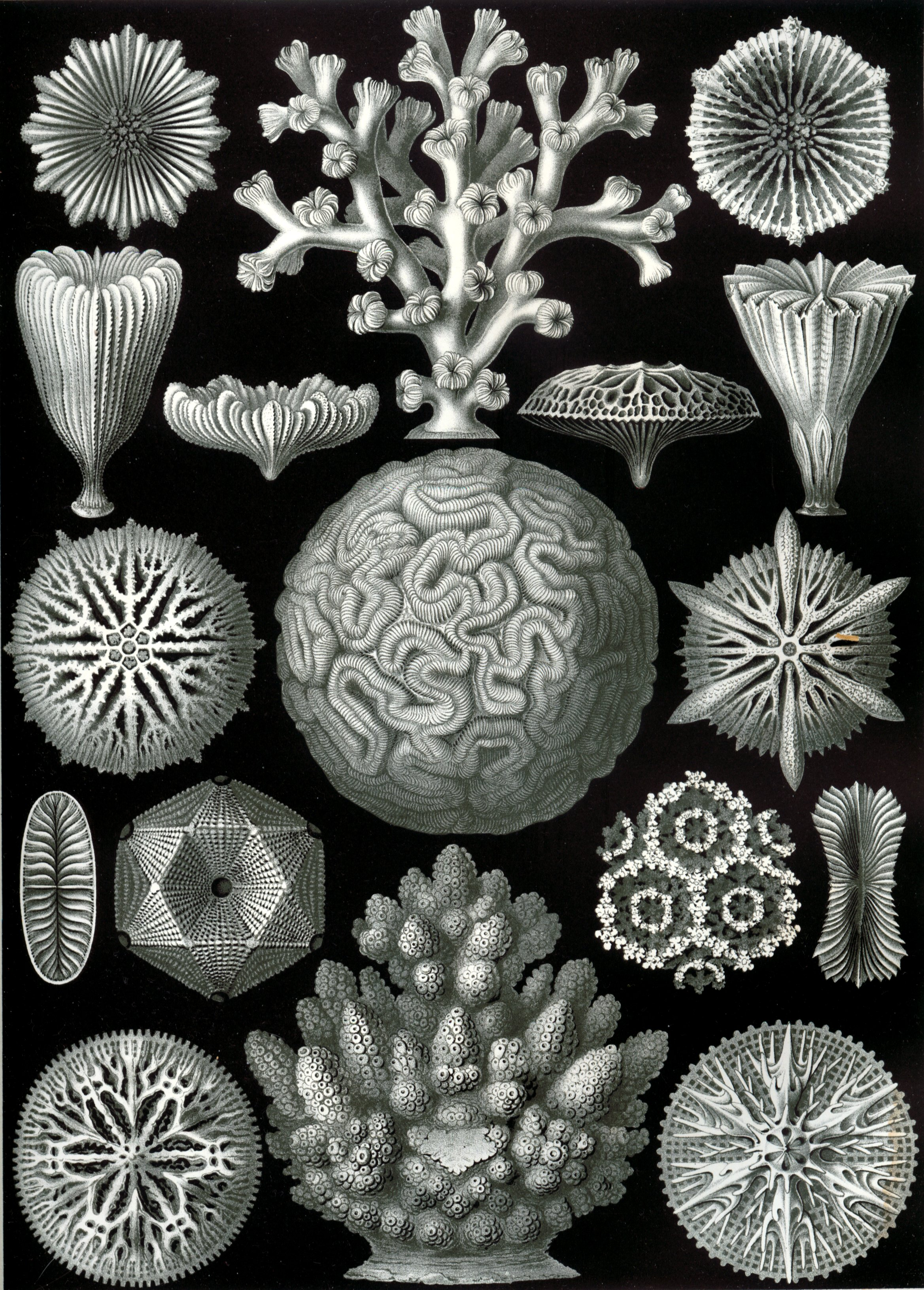
Fauna illustrations by Ernst Haeckel, were used as a backdrop during the tour.

In early August 2001, Björk confirmed the first set of dates for the Vespertine world tour which would take place at opera houses, theatres, and small venues, with favourable acoustics for the concerts. She enlisted Matmos, Zeena Parkins, a choir of Inuit girls from Greenland, and conductor Simon Lee; Visually, fauna illustrations by Ernst Haeckel were used as a backdrop during the tour.

The tour opened at the Grand Rex in Paris on 18 August. While in Paris, she held a press conference to discuss the album but gave no individual interviews saying that: "she'd rather do music than talk about it." While in France she also received the National Order of Merit at the Ministry of National Education in Paris. Another press conference was held in Barcelona on 3 November 2001 while touring in Spain.

A 16 December 2001 performance at the Royal Opera House in London was released as the DVD Live at Royal Opera House in 2002. A DVD release featuring a behind-the-scenes look at the tour, titled Minuscule, was released at the end of 2003. Vespertine Live, a live album consisting of songs recorded during the Vespertine world tour, was included in the 2003 box set Live Box; it also includes a live version of "All Is Full of Love", a song from Homogenic and "Overture" from Selmasongs.

== Commercial performance ==
Vespertine debuted at #19 on the Billboard 200 chart, selling 75,000 units in its first week, becoming her career peak in sales. It also debuted upon the top spot on the Top Electronic Albums chart, staying there for 3 weeks. One Little Indian head Derek Birket declaring that the album had sold over 1.2 million copies in Europe alone. That month, the album also became number one on the album charts in Iceland, Sweden, Denmark, France, Norway, and the European Top 100 Albums chart. In addition, Vespertine charted in the top 10 of Canada, Italy, Germany, Japan, the United Kingdom, Finland, Belgium, Switzerland, Sweden, Austria and Australia. The album has been certified Gold in Canada, France, Switzerland, and the United Kingdom.

Lead single "Hidden Place" reached the top spot of the singles charts in Spain, also charting in the top 40 in the United Kingdom, Canada, Italy, Denmark, Norway, Finland, Belgium and France. Following release "Pagan Poetry" also performed well in Spain, while entering the French chart at number 49 and the UK chart at number 38. "Cocoon" performed more poorly, charting at number 61 in France and number 35 in the United Kingdom.

== Critical reception ==
Professional ratings
Aggregate scores
Source	Rating
Metacritic	88/100
Review scores
Source	Rating
AllMusic	4.5/5 stars
Entertainment Weekly	B+
The Guardian	4/5 stars
Los Angeles Times	4/4 stars
NME	8/10
Pitchfork	7.2/10
Q	4/5 stars
Rolling Stone	4/5 stars
The Rolling Stone Album Guide	4.5/5 stars
The Village Voice	A−

Upon release, Vespertine received universal acclaim from music critics. At Metacritic, which assigns a normalised rating out of 100 to reviews from mainstream critics, the album received an average score of 88, based on 28 reviews. Various writers including David Fricke and Simon Reynolds named Vespertine Björk's best album to date. The album received some praise for its themes of intimacy and introversion, with Anthony Carew from About.com writing: "What makes Vespertine even more intriguing is the way that it marries its musical ambitions to its thematic emotions… And what makes it great… is the purity and intimacy of its feelings." Fricke and musicOMH's Michael Hubbard have both noted that the singer had shown a more mature side of her. The A.V. Club's Keith Phipps found it to be: "an album both timeless and of the moment, an avant-garde electronic-pop exploration of classic themes". In a later review for The New Rolling Stone Album Guide, Douglas Wolk described the album as "a banquet in the hall of Björk's personal erotics" and stated that "it's not the stuff of radio hits, but the music is spectacular".

An enthusiastic review came from The Wire, which felt that: "In the end, Vespertine commits its magic by daring to go places more obvious and more human than one would have ever expected." Calling it "one of the most impressive and cohesive" albums of the year, Tiny Mix Tapes found Vespertine to be Björk's most effective use of the studio as an instrument. Chris Smith of Stylus Magazine praised the album for its nuance and delicacy, describing its sonic palette as "a breath of fresh air." Additionally, Vespertine was thought to have challenged gender roles in rock music and in sexuality.

Q also praised the album, stating that it "quietly proves that cutting-edge production and human contact aren't mutually exclusive." American music journalist Robert Christgau enjoyed the album's central theme of sex and wrote: "when she gets all soprano on your ass you could accuse her of spirituality". A more lukewarm review came from Pitchfork's Ryan Schreiber, who felt that: "while undeniably beautiful, Vespertine fails to give electronic music the forward push it received on Björk's preceding albums". David Browne of Entertainment Weekly said "her lyrics occasionally dive into the deep end" and "her voice is at times stiff", although he also wrote "when it all comes together, [...] Björk and her electronica collaborators create moving interplanetary chorals". Almost Cool wrote: "if there's one question to be raised with the album, it's that it's all simply so lush and nice that on some levels it fails to excite".

In a 2015 interview with The Pitchfork Review, Björk said that her work on Vespertine was not fully acknowledged by press, she further added, "Matmos came in the last two weeks and added percussion on top of the songs, but they didn't do any of the main parts, and they are credited everywhere as having done the whole album.".

=== Accolades ===
In 2002, Vespertine was nominated for the Shortlist Music Prize, though the award went to In Search of... by N.E.R.D. The same year, the album received a Grammy Award nomination for Best Alternative Album, losing to Coldplay's Parachutes. In addition, Björk was nominated for Best International Female Solo Artist at the Brit Awards, and Best International Female Artist at the Italian Music Awards, while Vespertine was nominated for Album of the Year at the Icelandic Music Awards.

=== Rankings ===
Vespertine on select critic rankings
Publication	Country	Accolade	Year	Rank
Drowned in Sound	United Kingdom	The Top 66 Albums of 2000–2005	2006	1
Fact	United Kingdom	Top 100 Albums of the 2000s	2010	13
The Guardian	United Kingdom	The 100 Best Albums of the 21st Century	2019	27
The Line of Best Fit	United Kingdom	Top 30 Albums of the 2000s	2009	22
NME	United Kingdom	Best Albums of 2001	2016	32
NME	United Kingdom	Top 100 Albums of the 2000s	2009	95
NME	United Kingdom	The 500 Greatest Albums of All Time	2013	403
Resident Advisor	United Kingdom	Top 100 Albums of the 2000s	2010	54
Uncut	United Kingdom	Top 150 Albums of the 2000s	2009	55
The Wire	United Kingdom	2001 Rewind – 50 Records of the Year	2001	1
About.com	United States	Top 100 Albums of the 2000s	2010	2
The A.V. Club	United States	Top 50 Albums of the 2000s	2009	27
One Thirty BPM	United States	Top 100 Albums of the 2000s	2010	11
Paste	United States	Top 50 Albums of the 2000s	2009	50
Pitchfork	United States	Top 200 Albums of the 2000s	2009	92
PopMatters	United States	The 100 Best Albums of the 2000s	2014	32
Rolling Stone	United States	Albums of the Year	2001	Placed
Rolling Stone	United States	Top 100 Albums of the 2000s	2009	67
Slant Magazine	United States	Top 250 Albums of the 2000s	2010	3
Spin	United States	Albums of the Year	2001	16
Stylus Magazine	United States	The 50 Best Albums of 2000–2004	2005	36

== Track listing ==
All tracks are written by Björk, except where noted.

No.	Title	Writer(s)	Producer(s)	Length
1.	"Hidden Place"		Björk	5:28
2.	"Cocoon"	Björk; Thomas Knak	Björk; Knak	4:28
3.	"It's Not up to You"		Björk	5:08
4.	"Undo"	Björk; Knak	Björk	5:38
5.	"Pagan Poetry"		Björk; Marius de Vries^{[a]}	5:14
6.	"Frosti"		Björk	1:41
7.	"Aurora"		Björk	4:39
8.	"An Echo, a Stain"	Björk; Guy Sigsworth	Björk	4:04
9.	"Sun in My Mouth"	Björk; Sigsworth	Björk	2:40
10.	"Heirloom"	Björk; Martin Console	Björk; Console	5:12
11.	"Harm of Will"	Björk; Sigsworth; Harmony Korine	Björk	4:36
12.	"Unison"		Björk	6:45
Total length:				55:39

Japanese edition bonus track
No.	Title	Writer(s)	Producer(s)	Length
13.	"Generous Palmstroke"	Björk; Zeena Parkins	Björk; de Vries	4:08
Total length:				59:37

^{^[a]} signifies an additional producer.

== Personnel ==
Credits adapted from the liner notes of Vespertine.

Musicians

- Jake Davies – programming (1, 5), beat programming (7)
- Damian Taylor – programming (1, 12), beat programming (7, 8)
- Guy Sigsworth – programming (1, 12), choir arrangement (1, 8, 12), clavichord (3), clavichord arrangement (3), beat programming (8), celeste (8, 9, 11), celeste arrangement (9, 11)
- Matthew Herbert – programming (1, 12)
- Matmos – programming (1, 12), beat programming (7, 8)
- Björk – bassline (1, 5, 7, 9), choir arrangement (1, 3, 4), harp arrangement (3, 7, 12), programming (5, 12), music box arrangement (5–7), beat programming (7, 9), string arrangement (11)
- Vince Mendoza – choir arrangement (1, 3, 8, 11), orchestration (1, 3, 4, 8, 9, 11, 12), string arrangement (3, 4, 8, 9, 12)
- Thomas Knak – programming (2, 4)
- Valgeir Sigurðsson – beat programming (3, 9), programming (12)
- Zeena Parkins – harp arrangement (3–5, 8, 9, 12), harp (3, 4, 7, 8, 9, 12)
- Caryl Thomas – harp (3)
- Jack Perron – adaptation to music box (5–7)
- Marius de Vries – additional programming (7), beat programming (8)
- Martin Console – programming (10)

Technical

- Jake Davies – Pro Tools recording engineer (1, 3, 7, 12); Pro Tools (4), recording engineer (4, 8), vocals recording (10)
- Damian Taylor – Pro Tools recording engineer (1)
- Valgeir Sigurðsson – Pro Tools recording engineer (3, 12), Pro Tools (4), recording engineer (4, 8, 9, 11)
- Leigh Jamieson – Pro Tools recording engineer (3)
- Jan "Stan" Kybert – Pro Tools (4)
- Eric Gosh – music box engineering
- Juan Garcia – assistant engineer (Magic Shop)
- Damon Idins – assistant engineer (Astoria)
- Eric & Rory – assistant engineers (Avatar)
- Aarron Franz – assistant engineer (Sear Sound)
- Adrian Dawson – 2nd assistant engineer (Sear Sound)
- Ricardo Gary Walker – assistant
- Jason Spears – assistant
- Aaron – assistant
- Matt Fields – assistant
- Daniel Porter – assistant
- David Treahearn – assistant
- Björk – vocal editing (4, 11)
- Mark "Spike" Stent – mixing (all tracks)

Artwork

- Inez van Lamsweerde & Vinoodh Matadin – sleeve design
- M/M Paris – sleeve design

== Charts ==
=== Weekly charts ===
Weekly chart performance for Vespertine
Chart (2001)	Peak position
Australian Albums (ARIA)	9
Austrian Albums (Ö3 Austria)	5
Belgian Albums (Ultratop Flanders)	10
Belgian Albums (Ultratop Wallonia)	2
Canadian Albums (Billboard)	2
Czech Albums (ČNS IFPI)	11
Danish Albums (Hitlisten)	1
Dutch Albums (Album Top 100)	20
European Albums (Music & Media)	1
Finnish Albums (Suomen virallinen lista)	3
French Albums (SNEP)	1
German Albums (Offizielle Top 100)	3
Hungarian Albums (MAHASZ)	38
Icelandic Albums (Tónlist)	1
Irish Albums (IRMA)	26
Italian Albums (FIMI)	2
Japanese Albums (Oricon)	6
New Zealand Albums (RMNZ)	32
Norwegian Albums (VG-lista)	1
Polish Albums (ZPAV)	11
Portuguese Albums (AFP)	5
Scottish Albums (Official Charts)	16
Spanish Albums (AFYVE)	2
Swedish Albums (Sverigetopplistan)	7
Swiss Albums (Schweizer Hitparade)	3
UK Albums (Official Charts)	8
UK Independent Albums (Official Charts)	2
US Billboard 200	19
US Top Dance Albums (Billboard)	1

Chart (2025)	Peak position
Icelandic Albums (Tónlistinn)	30

=== Year-end charts ===
Year-end chart performance for Vespertine
Chart (2001)	Position
Canadian Albums (Nielsen SoundScan)	197
Danish Albums (Hitlisten)	90
European Albums (Music & Media)	55
French Albums (SNEP)	49
US Top Dance/Electronic Albums (Billboard)	4

== Certifications and sales ==
Certifications and sales for Vespertine
Region	Certification	Certified units/sales
Canada (Music Canada)	Gold	50,000^{^}
France (SNEP)	Gold	100,000^{*}
Japan (RIAJ)	Gold	124,550
Norway	—	10,000
Spain (Promusicae)	Gold	50,000^{^}
Switzerland (IFPI Switzerland)	Gold	20,000^{^}
United Kingdom (BPI)	Gold	100,000^{^}
United States	—	402,000
Summaries
Europe	—	1,200,000
^{*} Sales figures based on certification alone.^{^} Shipments figures based on certification alone.

== See also ==
- List of songs recorded by Björk
- List of Billboard number-one electronic albums of 2001
- List of number-one albums of 2001 (Spain)
