= Live at Royal Opera House =

Video by Björk
- Released: 18 November 2002
- Recorded: 16 December 2001
- Venue: Royal Opera House (London)
- Genres: Baroque pop, glitch pop, ambient pop
- Length: 1:34:38
- Label: One Little Indian
- Director: David Barnard

Björk chronology
| MTV Unplugged / Live (2002) | Live at Royal Opera House (2002) | Volumen Plus (2002) |

Live at Royal Opera House and also known as Vespertine Live at Royal Opera House is an official DVD released by Björk on 18 November 2002. It contains a live performance by Björk on the Vespertine world tour, recorded live at the Royal Opera House in London, on 16 December 2001. It was one of the last of the concerts performed on that tour. With this concert Björk had become the first ever contemporary pop artist to perform in the Royal Opera House. The concert was exclusively premiered on UK television in the launch week of the BBC digital channel BBC Four on 12 March 2002.

For the first half of the concert the majority of the songs were taken from her then most recent album Vespertine, while the second half sees songs played from her previous solo albums. The first two songs from the concert film also appear on the 2003/04 release, Vespertine Live. The closing song "It's in Our Hands" (which was then previously unheard) was later released as the lead-off single from her Greatest Hits album. The track "Generous Palmstroke" is a B-side, and appears in a different form on the "Hidden Place" single. Although listed as "Frosti", the first song of the concert is actually a music box version of "Pagan Poetry", as it appears on the "Cocoon" single. The DVD (and television broadcast) omits performances of two songs that were performed on the night - "Play Dead" and "Bachelorette".

A mini-documentary "Touring Vespertine" is also included as a bonus feature, a working version of what was to become the Minuscule DVD. However, the Minuscule documentary does not include some material which is included on "Touring Vespertine", such as the short interviews with composer Simon Lee (who was part of the Vespertine tour).

== Track listing ==
Vespertine Live at the Royal Opera House
| No. | Title | Writer(s) | Length |
|---|---|---|---|
| 1. | "Frosti" | Björk | 1:23 |
| 2. | "Overture" | Björk | 3:35 |
| 3. | "All is Full of Love" | Björk | 4:03 |
| 4. | "Aurora" | Björk | 3:52 |
| 5. | "Undo" | Björk; Thomas Knak | 5:54 |
| 6. | "Generous Palmstroke" | Björk; Zeena Parkins | 4:21 |
| 7. | "An Echo, a Stain" | Björk | 4:18 |
| 8. | "Hidden Place" | Björk; Mark Bell; Guy Sigsworth | 5:50 |
| 9. | "Cocoon" | Björk; Knak | 4:43 |
| 10. | "Unison" | Björk | 6:44 |
| 11. | "Harm of Will" | Björk; Sigsworth; Harmony Korine | 4:22 |
| 12. | "It's Not Up to You" | Björk | 5:22 |
| 13. | "Pagan Poetry" | Björk | 5:27 |
| 14. | "Possibly Maybe" | Björk; Nellee Hooper; Marius de Vries | 6:00 |
| 15. | "Isobel" | Björk; Hooper; de Vries; Sjón | 6:13 |
| 16. | "Hyperballad" | Björk | 4:59 |
| 17. | "Human Behaviour" | Björk; Hooper | 4:28 |
| 18. | "Jóga" | Björk | 6:36 |
| 19. | "It's in Our Hands" | Björk | 5:58 |

Bonus features
| No. | Title | Director(s) | Length |
|---|---|---|---|
| 20. | "Touring Vespertine" | Ragnheidur Gestsdóttir | 40:00 |

Notes

- "Frosti" is mislabelled; while "Frosti" is a music box instrumental found on Vespertine, this track is a live recording of the music box version of "Pagan Poetry" found on the "Cocoon" single.
