= Volumen (video) =

Video by Björk
- Released: 30 November 1998 (VHS); 31 May 1999 (DVD); 2 December 2002 (Greatest Hits edition)
- Genre: Alternative dance; electronica
- Length: 62:14; 92:24 (reissue)
- Label: One Little Indian
- Director: Michel Gondry; Sophie Muller; Danny Cannon; Stéphane Sednaoui; Jean-Baptiste Mondino; Spike Jonze; John Kricfalusi; Paul White; Alexander McQueen; Chris Cunningham; M/M Paris; Inez and Vinoodh; Eiko Ishioka; LynnFox

Björk chronology
| Live at Shepherds Bush Empire (1998) | Volumen (1998) | Live in Cambridge (2001) |
| Volumen Plus (2002) | Greatest Hits - Volumen 1993–2003 (2002) | Inside Björk (2003) |

Volumen is a music video collection released by Icelandic musician Björk on 30 November 1998 as a VHS and on 31 May 1999 as a DVD. It includes all of Björk's videos until "Hunter". On 2 December 2002, it was reissued as Greatest Hits - Volumen 1993–2003 which includes all the videos to "Nature Is Ancient". A separate DVD released in 2002, Volumen Plus, is available for those who purchased this original release and who want the additional seven videos. It has been certified Gold in the US.

== Track listing ==
| No. | Title | Director(s) | Length |
|---|---|---|---|
| 1. | "Human Behaviour" | Michel Gondry | 4:27 |
| 2. | "Venus as a Boy" | Sophie Muller | 5:54 |
| 3. | "Play Dead" | Danny Cannon | 4:01 |
| 4. | "Big Time Sensuality" | Stéphane Sednaoui | 5:03 |
| 5. | "Violently Happy" | Jean-Baptiste Mondino | 3:28 |
| 6. | "Army of Me" | Gondry | 4:35 |
| 7. | "Isobel" | Gondry | 4:24 |
| 8. | "It's Oh So Quiet" | Spike Jonze | 4:08 |
| 9. | "Hyperballad" | Gondry | 4:09 |
| 10. | "Possibly Maybe" | Sednaoui | 5:22 |
| 11. | "I Miss You" | John Kricfalusi | 4:11 |
| 12. | "Jóga" | Gondry | 3:22 |
| 13. | "Bachelorette" | Gondry | 5:26 |
| 14. | "Hunter" | Paul White | 4:13 |

Japan edition bonus disc
| No. | Title | Director(s) | Length |
|---|---|---|---|
| 1. | "All Is Full of Love" | Chris Cunningham | 4:50 |
| 2. | "Alarm Call" | Alexander McQueen | 3:52 |

Greatest Hits - Volumen 1993–2003
| No. | Title | Director(s) | Length |
|---|---|---|---|
| 15. | "Alarm Call" | Alexander McQueen | 3:52 |
| 16. | "All Is Full of Love" | Chris Cunningham | 4:18 |
| 17. | "Hidden Place" | M/M Paris; Inez and Vinoodh | 4:32 |
| 18. | "Pagan Poetry" | Nick Knight | 4:11 |
| 19. | "Cocoon" | Eiko Ishioka | 4:34 |
| 20. | "It's in Our Hands" | Jonze | 4:22 |
| 21. | "Nature Is Ancient" | LynnFox | 4:21 |
