= 2001 in red carpet fashion =

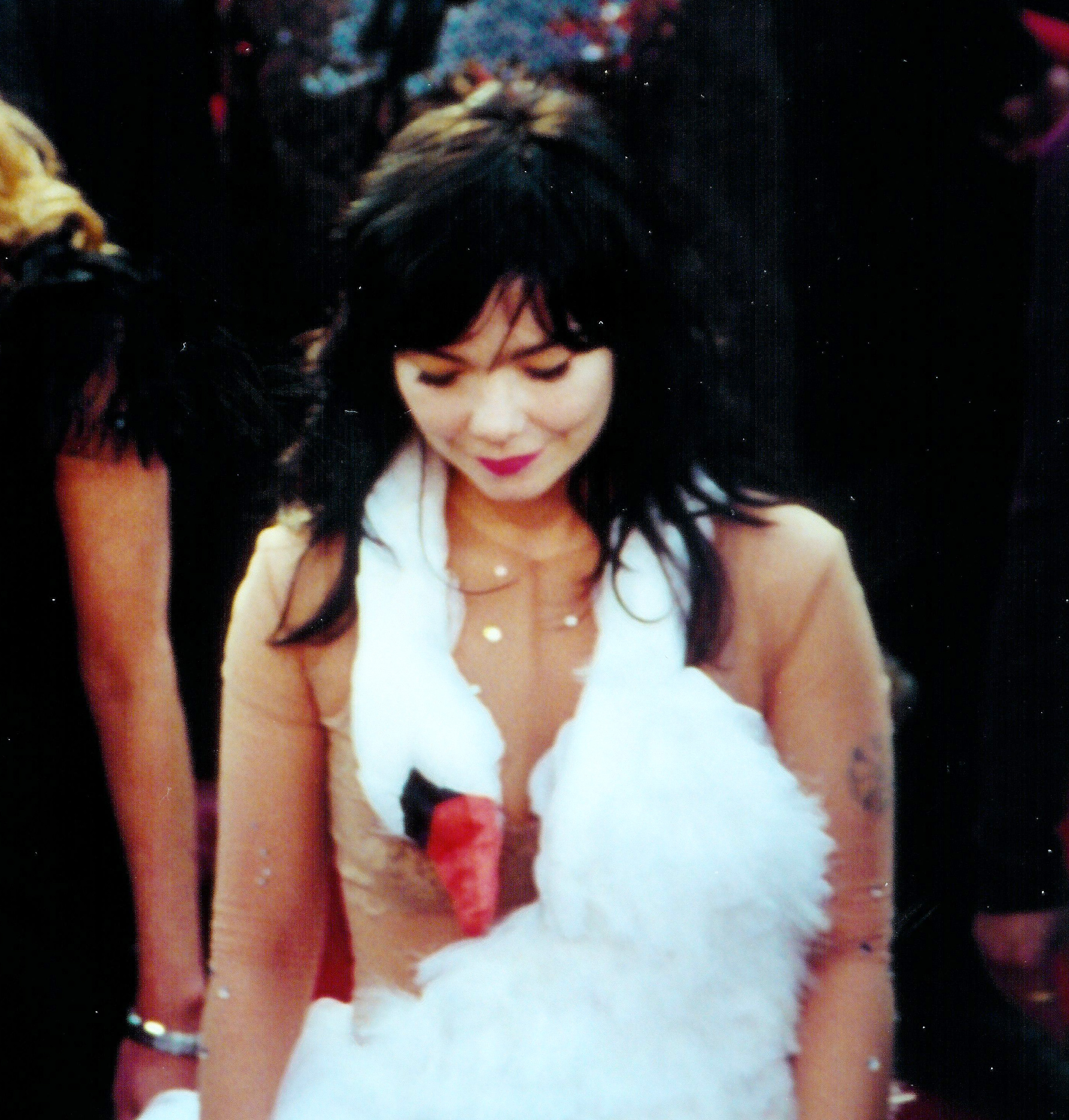
Björk at the 2001 Oscars in her swan dress

One of the most widely publicised red carpet outfits in 2001 was the distinctive swan dress worn by the singer Björk to the Oscars. The September 11 attacks and outbreak of the War in Afghanistan led to the postponement of the Emmys until November 4, when a subdued ceremony was held, with attendees asked to wear suits. This was the first time that such a request had been made of attendees of a major award ceremony since the 1942 Oscars followed the attack on Pearl Harbor.

== Golden Globe Awards (January 21) ==
Fashions at the 58th Golden Globe Awards were reviewed in an E! television programme hosted by Joan and Melissa Rivers and a panel of fashion experts.

== Academy Awards (March 25) ==
The theme of the gowns at the 73rd Academy Awards was described as "grown-up glamour", namely, full length corset-style strapless dresses emphasising curvaceous figures, worn with wraps and statement jewellery. One notable exception was Angelina Jolie in a white satin tuxedo pantsuit by Dolce & Gabbana.

Both Julia Roberts and Renée Zellweger wore vintage dresses. Zellweger's yellow chiffon dress was a 1959 design by Jean Dessès from the vintage dealer Lily et Cie, whilst Roberts wore a black and white Valentino dress originally designed in 1992. In 2008 Debenhams listed both dresses in their poll results for the top 20 'iconic red carpet dresses of all time', Roberts 3rd, and Zellweger 19th. Valentino said at the time that seeing Roberts collect her Oscar while wearing his gown was a particular high point of his 45-year career: "I have dressed so many people but I have to be sincere. The person that made me feel so very, very happy was Julia Roberts. When she got the Academy Award for Erin Brockovich I watched it on television and really I was so excited that she appeared in my dress." Roberts' dress was cited as an influence on prom dresses throughout the United States that year.

Less successful designs included Kate Hudson's "fussy" Stella McCartney dress and ringlets and Jennifer Lopez in a Chanel dress featuring a sheer chiffon top and a "slightly frumpy" skirt and mink false eyelashes. Male fashion wise, Russell Crowe was criticised for his ribbon bow-tie and hairstyle apparently inspired by Buddy Holly, which the Guardian correspondent compared unfavourably to the outfits worn by other male attendees, such as Tom Hanks's "sleek" Gucci and Jamie Bell in a Dior black suit, co-ordinating black shirt and tie.

One of the most memorable dresses of 2001 was the swan dress worn by the singer Björk. Marjan Pejoski's design resembled a giant swan wrapped around the wearer, and achieved great notoriety, being talked about, referenced and parodied in a number of sources for years after the event.

== Emmys (November 4) ==
Originally scheduled for September 16, the event was postponed due to the September 11 attacks, rescheduled for October 7, which was again postponed due to the start of the War in Afghanistan. Eventually, the 53rd Primetime Emmy Awards were held November 4 at the Shubert Theater. The ceremony was unsurprisingly subdued and low key, without a red carpet, and with attendees requested to wear "dressy business attire" as per the Academy's wishes. This was the first time that attendees of a major award ceremony had been requested to wear suits since the 14th Academy Awards in 1942 followed the attack on Pearl Harbor. It was described as a multimillion-dollar blow to the fashion industry with a spokeswoman for Harry Winston and the red-carpet-gown copyist Allen Schwartz both stating that they stood to lose huge amounts of publicity as a result. Designers such as Schwartz and Eduardo Lucero, who had already created gowns for Lorna Luft and Marla Sokoloff, had to design alternative suits for their clients at short notice. Lucero predicted that Emmy fashion would consist of modest designs in black or dark colours such as burgundy and navy. Joan River's red carpet show for E! was also cancelled.
