= Volumen Plus =

Video by Björk
- Released: 2 December 2002
- Genre: Alternative; electronica
- Length: 30:00
- Label: One Little Indian
- Director: Alexander McQueen; Chris Cunningham; Inez and Vinnoodh; M/M Paris; Eiko Ishioka; Lynn Fox

Björk chronology
Live at Royal Opera House (2002)	Volumen Plus (2002)	Greatest Hits – Volumen 1993–2003 (2002)

Volumen Plus is an official DVD released by Icelandic musician Björk on 2 December 2002. The DVD, whose release coincided with the release of the comprehensive Greatest Hits - Volumen 1993–2003, offers those who purchased the original Volumen release an opportunity to own the missing seven videos included on the newer release on DVD at a lower price. It includes all the videos from "Alarm Call" to "Nature Is Ancient", the latter of which being the only video on the release for which there was no corresponding single release, as the video was created only for the promotion of the Family Tree box-set.

== Track listing ==
No.	Title	Length
1.	"Alarm Call"	3:21
2.	"All Is Full of Love"	4:52
3.	"Hidden Place"	4:00
4.	"Pagan Poetry"	4:03
5.	"Cocoon"	3:33
6.	"It's in Our Hands"	4:15
7.	"Nature is Ancient"	2:37
