= Family Tree (Björk album) =

Box set by Björk
- Released: 4 November 2002
- Length: 141:09
- Label: One Little Indian
- Producer: Various

Björk chronology
| Greatest Hits (2002) | Family Tree (2002) | Live Box (2003) |

Professional ratings
Review scores
| Source | Rating |
|---|---|
| AllMusic | 4/5 stars |
| Blender | 3/5 stars |
| Entertainment Weekly | C+ |
| Pitchfork | 3.6/10 |
| Stylus Magazine | A− |

Family Tree is a box set of musical material by Icelandic singer Björk. The set consists of a book of lyrics entitled Words, five 3-inch compact discs of rare and previously unreleased material, and a regular-sized compact disc of greatest hits selected by Björk herself. Family Tree was released in November 2002, concurrent with the release of Björk's Greatest Hits album, in which the tracks were selected by her fans.

== Information ==
The five 3-inch compact discs include: Roots CD 1, which features songs recorded before Björk's "second solo debut" (i.e. previous to her 1993 album Debut). This compact disc features songs by her previous bands: Kukl, the Elgar Sisters, and the Sugarcubes. Roots CD 2 features B-sides and alternate versions of album tracks; Beats, which focuses on both new and old songs with a heavier electronica influence; and finally Strings CDs 1 and 2, which feature live and studio recordings of Björk with the Brodsky Quartet through 1999 and 2000.

The artwork on the CD was designed by M/M Paris in collaboration with Icelandic contemporary artist Gabríela Friðriksdóttir. The cover consists of a tree with letter on the upper part.

A music video for the song "Nature is Ancient", directed by Lynn Fox, was released in November 2002 to promote the compilation, even though the song was originally released in 1997. Originally, it was a B-side to the "Bachelorette" single, but it was later included on Family Tree. The video was also released on the compilation Greatest Hits - Volumen 1993–2003.

Björk's notes for the project, as featured on the individual CD artworks, reveal that "Immature" and "My Spine" were initially considered to feature on the compilation, as well as track(s) recorded with British composer John Tavener.

== Track listing ==
Disc 1 — Roots
| No. | Title | Writer(s) | Producer(s) | Length |
|---|---|---|---|---|
| 1. | "Síðasta Ég" (performed by the Elgar Sisters) | Björk; Guðlaugur Kristinn Óttarsson; Þór Eldon | Björk | 3:00 |
| 2. | "Glóra" (performed by the Elgar Sisters) | Björk | Björk | 1:42 |
| 3. | "Fuglar" (performed by Kukl) | Kukl | Kukl | 3:00 |
| 4. | "Ammæli" (performed by the Sugarcubes) | Sugarcubes | Ray Schulman; Derek Birkett | 3:55 |
| 5. | "Mamma" (performed by the Sugarcubes) | Sugarcubes | Schulman; Birkett | 2:57 |
| Total length: | | | | 14:05 |

Disc 2 — Roots
| No. | Title | Writer(s) | Producer(s) | Length |
|---|---|---|---|---|
| 1. | "Immature" (Björk's version) | Björk | Björk | 2:53 |
| 2. | "Cover Me" (Cave version) | Björk | Björk; Nellee Hooper | 3:07 |
| 3. | "Generous Palmstroke" (live at Accademia Nazionale di Santa Cecilia, Rome, 10th November 2001) | Björk; Zeena Parkins | Björk; Mark Bell | 4:42 |
| 4. | "Jóga" (Strings and Vocals) | Björk; Sjón | Björk | 4:42 |
| 5. | "Mother Heroic" | Björk; Guy Sigsworth | | 2:44 |
| Total length: | | | | 17:28 |

Disc 3 — Beats
| No. | Title | Writer(s) | Producer(s) | Length |
|---|---|---|---|---|
| 1. | "The Modern Things" (Demo version) | Björk; Graham Massey | Björk; Massey | 4:11 |
| 2. | "Karvel" | Björk; Massey | Massey | 4:30 |
| 3. | "I Go Humble" | Björk; Bell | | 4:47 |
| 4. | "Nature Is Ancient" | Björk; Bell | Björk; Bell | 3:40 |
| Total length: | | | | 16:28 |

Disc 4 — Strings
| No. | Title | Writer(s) | Length |
|---|---|---|---|
| 1. | "Unravel" (with the Brodsky Quartet) | Björk; Sigsworth | 3:38 |
| 2. | "Cover Me" (with the Brodsky Quartet) | Björk | 2:50 |
| 3. | "Possibly Maybe" (with the Brodsky Quartet) | Björk | 4:55 |
| 4. | "The Anchor Song" (with the Brodsky Quartet) | Björk | 3:44 |
| 5. | "Hunter" (with the Brodsky Quartet) | Björk | 4:31 |
| Total length: | | | 18:18 |

Disc 5 — Strings
| No. | Title | Writer(s) | Length |
|---|---|---|---|
| 1. | "All Neon Like" (with the Brodsky Quartet) | Björk | 5:07 |
| 2. | "I've Seen It All" (with the Brodsky Quartet) | Björk; Sjón; Lars von Trier | 5:59 |
| 3. | "Bachelorette" (with the Brodsky Quartet) | Björk; Sjón | 5:09 |
| 4. | "Play Dead" (with the Brodsky Quartet) | Björk; David Arnold; Jah Wobble | 3:25 |
| Total length: | | | 19:00 |

Disc 6 — Greatest Hits as Chosen by Björk
| No. | Title | Writer(s) | Length |
|---|---|---|---|
| 1. | "Venus as a Boy" | Björk | 4:41 |
| 2. | "Hyperballad" | Björk | 5:23 |
| 3. | "You've Been Flirting Again" | Björk | 2:29 |
| 4. | "Isobel" | Björk; Nellee Hooper; Marius De Vries; Sjón | 5:23 |
| 5. | "Jóga" | Björk; Sjón | 5:04 |
| 6. | "Unravel" | Björk; Sigsworth | 3:18 |
| 7. | "Bachelorette" | Björk; Sjón | 5:17 |
| 8. | "All Is Full of Love" | Björk | 4:46 |
| 9. | "Scatterheart" | Björk; Sjón; von Trier | 6:39 |
| 10. | "I've Seen It All" | Björk; Sjón; von Trier | 5:29 |
| 11. | "Pagan Poetry" | Björk | 5:14 |
| 12. | "It's Not Up to You" | Björk | 5:08 |
| Total length: | | | 59:25 |

Notes

- "Mother Heroic" contains lyrics taken from the poem "Belgium" by E. E. Cummings.

== Charts ==
| Chart (2003) | Peak position |
|---|---|
| Denmark | 39 |
| France | 100 |
| Japan (Oricon) | 174 |
| U.S. Top Electronic Albums (Billboard) | 6 |
