= Volumen =

Volumen is a Latin word for "roll" or "volume" and may refer to:

- A type of scroll
- Volumen (video), a 1998 video by Björk

== See also ==
- Volumen Plus, a 2002 video by Björk
- Volumen 5, a 1990 album by Los Fabulosos Cadillacs
