= Greatest Hits (Björk album) =

- Standard cover (Note: Some editions include the album's title with the same lettering as the singer's name at the center with a smaller drawing.)

Greatest hits album by Björk
- Released: 4 November 2002
- Recorded: 1993–2002
- Genre: Electropop
- Length: 72:19
- Label: One Little Indian
- Producers: Björk; Nellee Hooper; Mark Bell; Graham Massey; David Arnold; Danny Cannon; Drew Daniel

Björk chronology
Vespertine (2001)	Greatest Hits (2002)	Family Tree (2002)

Singles from Greatest Hits
- 1. "It's in Our Hands" Released: 9 November 2002

Professional ratings
Review scores
Source	Rating
AllMusic	4.5/5 stars
Christgau's Consumer Guide	A−
Entertainment Weekly	A
Drowned in Sound	10/10
NME	9/10
NOW	3/5 stars
Pitchfork	9.2/10
Rolling Stone	4/5 stars
Slant Magazine	3/5 stars
Tom Hull – on the Web	B+

Greatest Hits is a compilation album by Icelandic musician and singer Björk, released on 4 November 2002 through One Little Indian. Although not all of Björk's singles are included on this collection, all of the songs on Greatest Hits were released as singles. The tracks were selected by fans through a survey on Björk's website. Greatest Hits presents the songs in descending order of most-popular votes, with the exception of "It's in Our Hands" which was a new song and appears at the end of the compilation.

== Information ==
There were two online surveys preceding the release of Greatest Hits. The survey that gave the track list was one where fans voted for their favourite singles. Another one was conducted simultaneously where fans could vote for their favourite of all her songs, album tracks as well as B-sides. This sometimes is the cause for some confusion about the authenticity of the fan-selected track list concept because the results from the single-track survey does not always match with the overall survey. For example, "Hyperballad" was the song receiving most votes from Björk fans on the overall survey, but appears as the second track on Greatest Hits. The results of both surveys can be seen on Björk's website.

Several of the songs are presented in their radio (or single) remixed forms, most notably "Big Time Sensuality" (the Fluke version featured in the promotional video, and not the shorter "Minimix" as featured on the single). "Possibly Maybe" includes the famous electronic sounds that were temporarily deleted off the Post version of the track, and "All Is Full of Love" is presented in its single version.

As with many greatest hits compilation albums, some of Björk's biggest singles were absent. The most obvious omission is "It's Oh So Quiet", her highest-charting UK hit. Also missing are "Alarm Call", "I Miss You", "Cocoon" and "Violently Happy" as well as any pre-Debut material.

The tracks "Human Behaviour", "Big Time Sensuality", and "Venus as a Boy" are taken from Björk's 1993 album Debut. "Play Dead" was originally released on the Young Americans movie soundtrack (1993) but was included on some editions of Debut.

"Hyperballad", "Army of Me", "Isobel", and "Possibly Maybe" are from the 1995 Post album. "All Is Full of Love", "Jóga", "Bachelorette", and "Hunter" are from her 1997 Homogenic album. Finally, "Pagan Poetry" and "Hidden Place" are found on her 2001 Vespertine album.

The artwork on the CD was produced in collaboration with Icelandic contemporary artist Gabríela Friðriksdóttir. It is the only one of Björk's album covers that includes both a logo and a title.

Greatest Hits was released on the same day as Björk's Family Tree box set, which contained a "greatest hits" disc on which the songs were chosen by Björk. Greatest Hits and the greatest hits "as chosen by Björk" have seven tracks in common.

The Greatest Hits album was also listed on Blender magazine's "500 CDs You Must Own".

== Track listing ==
No.	Title	Writer(s)	Producer(s)	Length
1.	"All Is Full of Love" (Video Version; from Homogenic, 1997)	Björk	Björk	4:46
2.	"Hyperballad" (from Post, 1995)	Björk	Nellee Hooper; Björk	5:23
3.	"Human Behaviour" (from Debut, 1993)	Björk; Hooper	Hooper	4:14
4.	"Jóga" (from Homogenic, 1997)	Björk; Sjón	Björk; Mark Bell	5:04
5.	"Bachelorette" (from Homogenic, 1997)	Björk; Sjón	Björk	5:18
6.	"Army of Me" (from Post, 1995)	Björk; Graham Massey	Hooper; Massey; Björk	3:57
7.	"Pagan Poetry" (from Vespertine, 2001)	Björk	Björk	5:14
8.	"Big Time Sensuality" (The Fluke Minimix Video Version; from Debut, 1993)	Björk; Hooper	Björk; Hooper; Fluke (remix)	4:56
9.	"Venus as a Boy" (from Debut, 1993)	Björk	Hooper	4:41
10.	"Hunter" (from Homogenic, 1997)	Björk	Björk; Bell	4:16
11.	"Hidden Place" (from Vespertine, 2001)	Björk; Guy Sigsworth; Bell	Björk	5:28
12.	"Isobel" (from Post, 1995)	Björk; Hooper; Marius De Vries; Sjón	Hooper; Björk	5:49
13.	"Possibly Maybe" (from Post, 1995)	Björk; Hooper; De Vries	Hooper; Björk	5:07
14.	"Play Dead" (from The Young Americans soundtrack, 1993)	Björk; David Arnold; Jah Wobble	Arnold; Danny Cannon	3:57
15.	"It's in Our Hands"	Björk	Björk; Drew Daniel	4:15
Total length:				72:19

== Charts ==
=== Weekly charts ===
Weekly chart performance for Greatest Hits
Chart (2002)	Peak position
Australian Albums (ARIA)	84
Austrian Albums (Ö3 Austria)	64
Belgian Albums (Ultratop Flanders)	42
Belgian Albums (Ultratop Wallonia)	18
European Albums (Music & Media)	67
German Albums (Offizielle Top 100)	71
Italian Albums (FIMI)	39
Japanese Albums (Oricon)	20
Scottish Albums (Official Charts)	55
Swedish Albums (Sverigetopplistan)	52
Swiss Albums (Schweizer Hitparade)	24
UK Albums (Official Charts)	53
UK Independent Albums (Official Charts)	6
US Billboard 200	115
US Top Dance Albums (Billboard)	2

=== Year-end charts ===
2002 year-end chart performance for Greatest Hits
Chart (2002)	Position
Canadian Alternative Albums (Nielsen SoundScan)	176

2003 year-end chart performance for Greatest Hits
Chart (2003)	Position
US Top Dance/Electronic Albums (Billboard)	15

== Certifications ==
Certifications for Greatest Hits
Region	Certification	Certified units/sales
Argentina (CAPIF)	Gold	20,000^{^}
Canada (Music Canada)	Gold	50,000^{^}
Japan (RIAJ)	Gold	100,000^{^}
United Kingdom (BPI)	Gold	100,000^{^}
^{^} Shipments figures based on certification alone.
