= List of Billboard number-one electronic albums of 2001 =

These are the albums that reached number one on the Billboard Dance/Electronic Albums chart in 2001.

== Chart history ==
Key
†	Indicates best-performing album of 2001

Issue date	Album	Artist	Reference
July 14	Lara Croft: Tomb Raider	Soundtrack	
July 21	Totally Dance	Various artists	
July 28	Totally Dance	Various artists	
August 4	Totally Dance	Various artists	
August 11	Totally Dance	Various artists	
August 18	Tweekend	The Crystal Method	
August 25	Tweekend	The Crystal Method	
September 1	Tweekend	The Crystal Method	
September 8	Tweekend	The Crystal Method	
September 15	Vespertine	Björk	
September 22	Vespertine	Björk	
September 29	A Funk Odyssey	Jamiroquai	
October 6	Vespertine	Björk	
October 13	Pulse †	Various artists	
October 20	Beautiful Garbage	Garbage	
October 27	Beautiful Garbage	Garbage	
November 3	Beautiful Garbage	Garbage	
November 10	Beautiful Garbage	Garbage	
November 17	Beautiful Garbage	Garbage	
November 24	Beautiful Garbage	Garbage	
December 1	Beautiful Garbage	Garbage	
December 8	Pulse †	Various artists	
December 15	Pulse †	Various artists	
December 22	Pulse †	Various artists	
December 29	Pulse †	Various artists	
