= Swan dress =

Gown worn by Björk in 2001

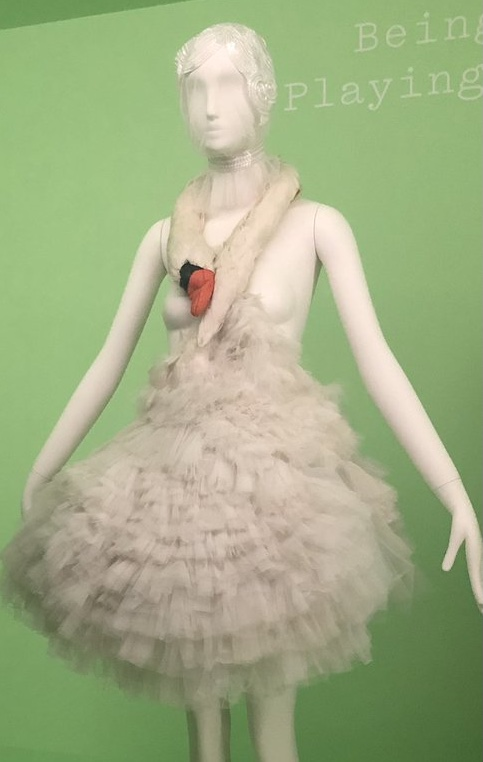
- Designer: Marjan Pejoski
- Year: 2001
- Type: White red carpet dress

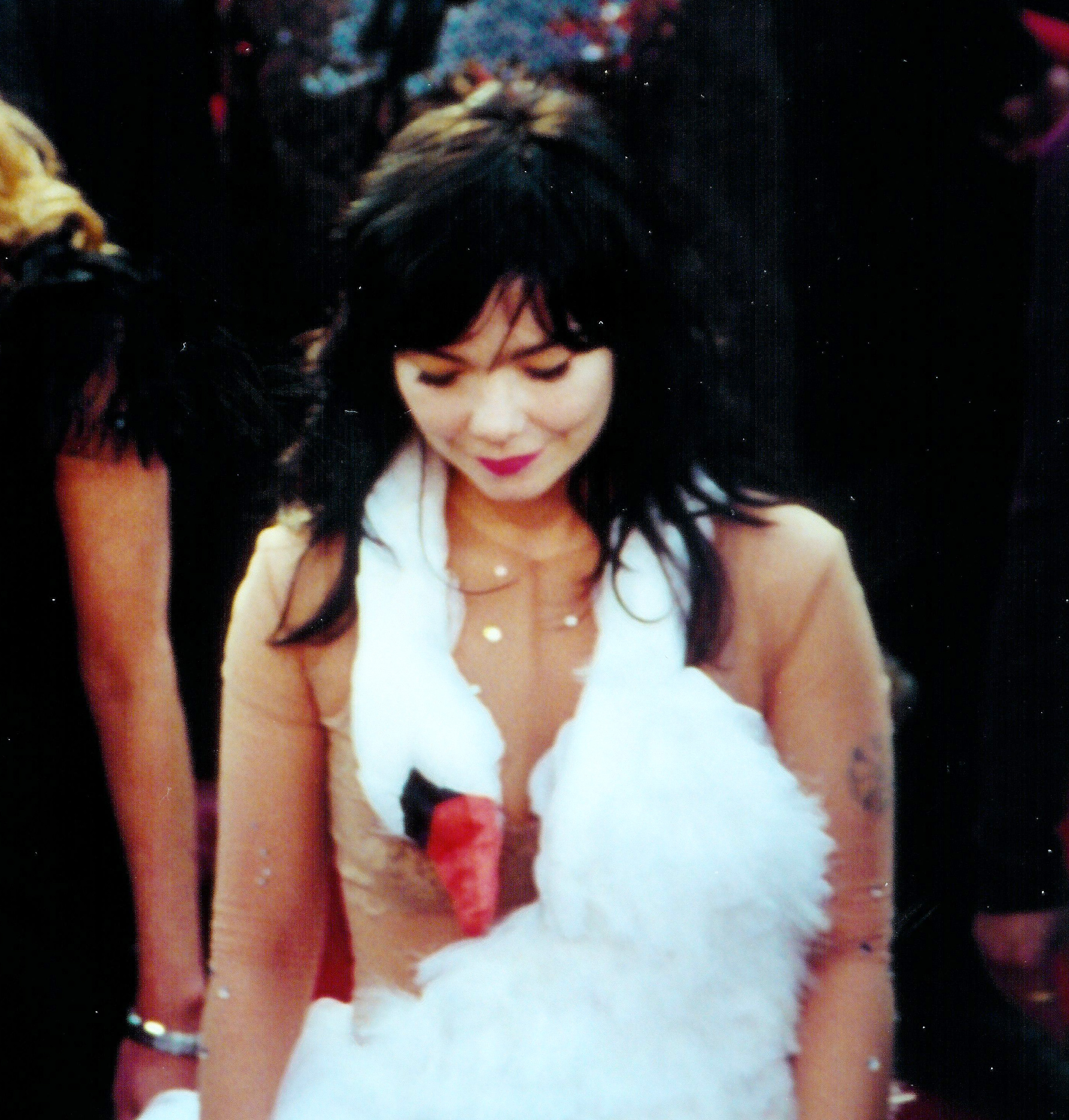
Björk at the 2001 Academy Awards, wearing her swan dress

The swan dress is a dress resembling a mute swan designed by Marjan Pejoski and worn by the Icelandic music artist Björk at the 73rd Academy Awards on March 25, 2001, as well as on the cover of her album Vespertine. A Debenhams poll published in The Daily Telegraph in 2008 voted it the ninth-most iconic red carpet dress of all time. Björk's swan dress was reimagined by Valentino at its Spring 2014 Couture fashion show at Paris Fashion Week, which received praise from fashion blogs and social media. In 2019, the dress was featured in the Metropolitan Museum of Art for the exhibition Camp: Notes on Fashion.

== Design ==
Björk said "It was a tribute to Busby Berkeley and that sort of elegance."

Designed by Macedonian designer Marjan Pejoski, the dress was designed like a mute swan (Cygnus olor) and at the ceremony Björk mimicked laying an egg on the red carpet. It was described by Emanuel Levy as "A giant swan dress, a full-body stocking that was covered with a giant swan whose neck wrapped around her with its head and beak resting on her breasts". She had two copies of the dress produced, given that it could not be taken to the dry cleaners. She later wore the dress on the cover of her 2001 record album Vespertine, photographed by Inez and Vinoodh, and variations of it many times on the Vespertine world tour. One of the copies was auctioned off for the international aid agency Oxfam on eBay and sold for $9,500 in 2005.

== Reception and legacy ==
The dress was talked about in the fashion and entertainment world for weeks after the event. It was widely criticized and seen as outrageous and outlandish and an outfit that "became the year's fashion faux pas". Some viewed it as bizarre enough to be more than just a publicity stunt, something confirmed by Björk. Jay Carr of the Boston Globe wrote, "Bjork's wraparound swan frock...made her look like a refugee from the more dog-eared precincts of provincial ballet", while Steven Cojocaru called the dress "probably one of the dumbest things I've ever seen". Joan Rivers remarked "Later I saw her in the ladies room spreading papers on the floor...This girl should be put into an asylum." However, the dress was praised by some for its originality; The New York Observer's verdict was "total overall j'adore" and Melissa Etheridge was also reported to have acclaimed the dress.

In response to the media hype, Björk said "It's just a dress". She said, "I don't really know why I'm obsessed with swans but as I said, everything about my new album is about winter and they're a white, sort of winter bird. Obviously very romantic, being monogamous. It's one of those things that maybe I'm too much in the middle of to describe. When you're obsessed with something, you can explain it five years later, but in the moment, you don't know exactly why. Right now, swans seem to sort of stand for a lot of things." The swan or water bird slung around the neck or hung limply under a person's arm could be a reference to The Rime of the Ancient Mariner written in 1798.

It has been suggested that the dress may have been inspired by Annie Leibovitz's 1997 Vanity Fair photograph of Leonardo DiCaprio holding a swan, its neck curled around his own in a position similar to the swan dress. In 1935, Hollywood actress Marlene Dietrich wore a similar swan dress to a costume party which she attended dressed as the Greek mythological character Leda.

== In popular media ==
The dress was later emulated by Ellen DeGeneres at the 53rd Primetime Emmy Awards. Kevin James wore a version of it at the 2002 People's Choice Awards. In 2006, at the 78th Academy Awards, host Jon Stewart remarked "Björk couldn't be here tonight...She was trying on her Oscar dress and Dick Cheney shot her." in a reference to the Dick Cheney hunting incident. In 2007, the gown was proposed to take part in the year's Oscar fashion show, highlighting the signature gowns from the red carpets of the Oscars from the past years. However, according to Oscar producer Laura Ziskin, Björk's team refused to let the dress take part.

The dress was parodied in the 2004 comedy film White Chicks (which Wayans' characters showed up at the runway) and the 2005 comedy film My Big Fat Independent Movie, as well as an episode of Nickelodeon's The Fairly OddParents, along Kim Possible and an episode of Hannah Montana, where the title character (played by Cyrus) is seen wearing it to a gala event. The dress was also parodied on an episode of Disney Channel's Sonny with a Chance where a character wears the dress to an award show. It was also parodied in one sketch from MADtv when the character named Mrs. Swan portrayed by actress Alex Borstein goes on a date using the same dress as Björk. The dress appears also in the music video of Nelly Furtado's "Bajo otra luz" while Furtado dances wearing a copy of the dress. In the third-season episode of the FX animated comedy Archer, "Space Race", Cheryl wears a costume that closely resembles Björk's dress. In the third-season episode of Leverage, "The Studio Job", the character where Parker wears a very similar dress while disguised as a Swedish pop star. A paper version of the dress appeared on the seventh season of RuPaul's Drag Race, worn by Katya Zamolodchikova. On Total Drama Presents: The Ridonculous Race, there was an "Icelandic woman" that resembled Björk wearing the swan dress.

In her 2005 comedy CD album Assassin, Margaret Cho lauded the swan dress for its originality, stating, "And all of the fashion magazines said she was the worst dressed, but when they say you're the worst, that means you're the best." She classed Björk with the "great divas" of Hollywood for wearing it. She also cited the swan dress as an inspiration for her own choice to wear a peacock feather gown by Narcisse to the 2004 Grammy Awards and her pleasure at similarly being named "worst dressed."

On Halloween 2023, Spain-based singer Rosalía wore a costume of Björk’s "swan dress" look, ahead of her and Björk's release of the song "Oral," which she was featured on.

== See also ==
- List of individual dresses
