= Cocoon (Björk song) =

2002 single by Björk

Single by Björk

from the album Vespertine
- B-side: "Amphibian"; "Pagan Poetry"; "Sun in My Mouth"
- Released: 11 March 2002
- Recorded: January 2001 ("Cocoon"); 1999 ("Amphibian")
- Studio: Olympic (London)
- Length: 4:30 (album version); 3:34 (radio edit)
- Label: One Little Indian
- Songwriters: Björk; Thomas Knak
- Producers: Björk; Thomas Knak

Björk singles chronology
"Pagan Poetry" (2001)	"Cocoon" (2002)	"It's in Our Hands" (2002)

Audio sample
- file; help

"Cocoon" is a song by Icelandic singer Björk for her fourth studio album, Vespertine (2001). Written and produced by Björk and Thomas Knak, it was released as the album's third single on 11 March 2002 by One Little Indian Records. Inspired by her relationship with artist Matthew Barney, Björk wanted to create a record with a domestic mood. Working with Knak, she wrote "Cocoon", a song which is lyrically about a woman who describes making love with her lover during their post-coital hibernation, and includes frank sexual narrative related both explicitly and through metaphor.

Music critics received "Cocoon" with positive reviews, calling it one of the album's highlights. The song experienced moderate commercial success on record charts in the United Kingdom, Australia, and France but reached the top ten in Spain. The accompanying music video for "Cocoon" was directed by Eiko Ishioka and was filmed in New York City. It premiered at the Raindance Film Festival in October 2001, and was made available online through the singer's official website in February 2002, closer to the song's release as a single. It depicts Björk as a geisha whose makeup extends over her entire bleached nude body. The video was considered inappropriate and was banned from primetime MTV, following her music video for "Pagan Poetry". Björk promoted the song by performing it on the Vespertine world tour and several television and radio shows.

== Background and development ==
In 2000, Björk starred on her acting debut Dancer in the Dark. While she worked on the film, she also began producing her next album, writing new music and teaming with new collaborators. She had to go to Denmark to work on the film and there was nothing going on. She was lying on the beach whilst looking at the ocean, with a ghetto blaster listening to producer Thomas Knak's music. When she realised he was from Copenhagen, she called him up". "Cocoon", produced by Knak, was one of the last songs to be written for the album; its melody came to Björk in a sudden rush and she contacted him. She made a long-distance, late-night phone call to Knak in Denmark, and woke him up. "I didn't have any track of time so she didn't really know that I was asleep. She was explaining that she had this melody in her head and maybe, if I had the time, she would still have two or three weeks to decide if this track could be worked on", said the producer. Knak took it as a chance to make a more minimal track, similar to his own releases. He liked the idea of having two songs on the album, and immediately after he put down the phone, he started working. His original treatment of "Cocoon", made with an Ensoniq ASR-10, appeared relatively intact in the final version. Knak elaborated: "She had two changes: one for one semitone up and another for I think about 20BPM slower or something. I don't really make music so I'm not really used to thinking could the singer really sing in a tempo. From there she started working on the lyrics and one more melody for the vocal".

They met up in January 2001 in London to record the song. He went into a studio with only three tracks for the mix, and was impressed that there were many technicians and programmers that probably had been using a hundred. However, the singer was protecting the idea of the raw version, and said: "This is how we wanted to be". They added two changes to the song and then spent the rest of the day recording Björk's vocals. They wanted to have only one take that really worked so that they did not have to edit different takes. They recorded 20 takes, and used the fifth or sixth, and because of that, the producer thought that "this track is very intimate and personal because of the way the vocals were recorded". The way the song was recorded was "kind of rough" according to Knak; "It's also very close to the mic; all these things that you wouldn't normally keep. In that sense, it is very kind of, almost naked. In the structure and in the feeling because of the lyrics".

== Music and lyrics ==
"Cocoon" is a song based around a bassline and beats which "sound like fingertips on skin". Discussing the glitch sound of the song, Björk said: "when you take technology and use the areas where it breaks, where it's faulty, you're entering a mystery zone where you can't control it." Björk's whispered vocals in "Cocoon" were described as "near-cracking falsetto and a breathy ecstasy". Lyrically, for Michael Cragg from The Guardian newspaper, "it feels almost intrusive, like reading someone's diary as they write about a new love", as Björk had just started the relationship with Barney. Its lyrics are set between metaphor, with her singing "who would have known that a boy like him would have entered me lightly, restoring my blisses" and more direct language, such as "He slides inside, half awake, half asleep ... gorgeousness, he's still inside me".

When asked about its sexually explicit nature, the singer responded: "Erm, yeah. I guess a part of me wanted to be truthful about what it is that really drives me, and maybe give back to the place that is nourishing me ... I don't know what to say. When I read books or see films or listen to albums I want certain things. I want a heart—I'm very old school like that, I'm very emotional ... I just didn't want anybody to know. I wanted it for myself. The lyric to 'Cocoon' was a whole diary, then I had to edit 90 per cent of it out. It's very hard to explain, but when I read it and the other person it's about reads it, we don't feel abused or anything. I think there's songs where I've been more ... scruffy about what I'm expressing. I have a problem with music that's too indulgent. It's like 'Keep your own dirty laundry, please'".

== Critical reception ==
"Cocoon" was received with positive reviews from music critics. AllMusic's Heather Phares called the song "seductively alien". Seth Stevenson from Slate magazine gave a positive review to it, commenting that because of the song, Björk is "actually at her best either barely murmuring or full-out yelling, and she may be the most stylized vocalist in music today". Michael Cragg from The Guardian commented that "Vespertine is littered with defining moments. While the first single Hidden Place, the choir-assisted Undo and the Matmos collaboration Aurora are among the highlights, it's Cocoon that best represents the album's sense of heavy-lidded, post-coital hibernation". David Fricke from Rolling Stone commented that "the flurry of rhythm" at the start of the song felt like "the gravity of a spider scurrying across linoleum". Ian Gittins, author of Björk: Human Behaviour - the Stories Behind Every Song, referred to "Cocoon" as the eyes of many of the most significant moments of Vespertine, as well as the most complete display and literal philosophy that the singer had taken for the album.

British magazine NME's Joe Logic was also positive saying, "Soft organs and Rice Krispies (Eh? - Cereal Ed) feature heavily on a very minimalist 'Cocoon', a beautiful love song featuring Bjork whispering sexual lyrics over a track that To Rococo Rot would be proud of". Stephen Dalton from the same publication was less positive, and stated: "Then there is the uncomfortably intimate, tremble-whisper Björk voice of 'Cocoon' where she relates the joy of shutting herself away with her lover with a broken music box and some mouldy old string". Greg Kot from Blender magazine commented that album openers "Hidden Place" and "Cocoon" "live up to their billing as sound sanctuaries, with Björk singing a barely-above-a-whisper lullaby enhanced by the plush embrace of a choir". The Wire opined that the track "nearly matches the macabre tone of Dancer in the Dark, particularly the trembling moment three minutes in, when her barely audible whisper conjures a feeling beyond sadness as she pleads, 'Who would have known?'"

== Commercial performance ==
In the United Kingdom, "Cocoon" debuted at its peak position of number 35 on the UK Singles Chart issued on 17 March 2002. It fell to number 65 the next week, before falling off the chart altogether in its third week. The song debuted at number 61 in France on 23 March 2002, but fell to number 89 the next week, before falling off the chart. In Spain, "Cocoon" was a commercial success, peaking at number nine.

== Promotion ==
=== Music video ===
Björk in the accompanying music video for "Cocoon."

The accompanying music video for "Cocoon" was directed by Eiko Ishioka and shot in April 2001 in New York City. It premiered at the Raindance Film Festival on 24 October 2001, and was made available online via Björk's official website on 12 February 2002. Its treatment was described as playing with "minimalist white for both costume and bleached eyebrows, treating Björk as a geisha whose makeup extends over her entire nude body". The video begins with many apparently nude Björks singing. Throughout the video, red threads emerge from her nipples and circulate between her breasts and nose, finally enveloping her in a cocoon. Björk actually wore a very close-fitting body suit. Following the music video for previous single "Pagan Poetry", it was also banned from primetime MTV. The music video for "Cocoon" was included on Björk's video albums Volumen Plus (2002) and Greatest Hits – Volumen 1993–2003 (2002). The cover for the CD single was created by Ishioka's collaborator, graphic designer Rafael Esquer, who followed her simple direction to “make it beautiful, make it shockingly beautiful!”

=== Live performances ===
Björk performed "Cocoon" on the 2001 Vespertine world tour. It was later included on the DVD Live at Royal Opera House (2002). She also performed the song on the American talk show The Tonight Show with Jay Leno. Jeremy Allen from NME magazine included it on his list of "10 Greatest Musical Moments" on the show, commenting: "with her fingers tinted like icicles and the background sonics just a sparse and glitchy soundscape with tinkles of warm xylophone like the inside of some ethereal cave, the singer takes a little bit of Iceland to the USA – via heaven – with her voice as commanding as it ever was". She also performed it across Europe following its release as a single, including The Jonathan Ross Show, Die Harald Schmidt Show, Johnny Vaughan Tonight, Top of the Pops, and Music Planet 2Nite.

== Track listings and formats ==
UK CD1

1. "Cocoon" – 4:30
2. "Pagan Poetry" (Music Box) – 3:00
3. "Sun in My Mouth" (Recomposed by Ensemble) – 3:10

UK CD2

1. "Cocoon" (radio edit) – 3:34
2. "Aurora" (Music Box) – 1:08
3. "Amphibian" – 4:35

UK DVD

1. "Cocoon" – 4:30
2. "Pagan Poetry" (Music Box) – 3:00
3. "Sun in My Mouth" (Recomposed by Ensemble) – 3:10

UK CDR

1. "Cocoon" (radio edit) – 3:34

UK VHS

1. "Cocoon" (music video) – 4:23

== Credits and personnel ==
Credits adapted from "Cocoon" liner notes.

- Björk − vocals, songwriter, producer, programming
- Thomas Knak − songwriter, producer, programming
- Mark "Spike" Stent − mixing
- Eiko Ishioka − art direction
- Tim Wilder − CGI artist
- Rafael Esquer − graphic design
- Erik Gosh − music box engineering at Bugosh Music Recording Studios
- Siobhan Paine − coordination at Olympic Studios, London, England

== Charts ==
Weekly chart performance for "Cocoon"
Chart (2002)	Peak position
Australia (ARIA)	74
Canada (Nielsen SoundScan)	44
France (SNEP)	61
Portugal (AFP)	6
Scottish Singles Sales (Official Charts)	63
Spain (Promusicae)	9
UK Singles (Official Charts)	35
UK Indie (Official Charts)	3

== Release history ==
Release dates and formats for "Cocoon"
Region	Date	Format(s)	Label(s)	Ref.
France	11 March 2002	DVD (clean)	Polydor	
United Kingdom	11 March 2002	Two CDs; DVD	One Little Indian	
France	19 March 2002	DVD (explicit)	Polydor	
Japan	27 March 2002	CD; DVD	Polydor	
Australia	8 April 2002	Two CDs	Polydor	

== Bibliography ==
- Pytlik, Mark (2003). Björk: Wow and Flutter. ECW Press. ISBN 978-0-8195-6514-3.
- Gittins, Ian (2002). Björk: Human Behaviour - the Stories Behind Every Song. Giunti Editore. ISBN 978-1-84222-673-5.
