= Marjan Pejoski =

Macedonian fashion designer

- Марјан Пејоски
- Born: 1968 (age 56–57); Skopje, SR Macedonia, SFR Yugoslavia
- Education: Central Saint Martins
- Label: K-T-Z
- Website: k-t-z.co.uk

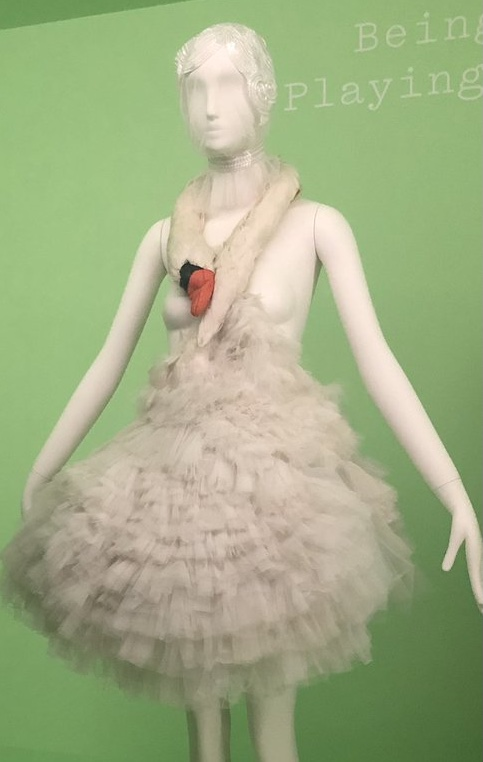
Björk's swan dress designed by Pejoski

Marjan Pejoski (Macedonian: Марјан Пејоски; born 1968) is a Macedonian fashion designer who lives and works in the United Kingdom. He studied at the Central Saint Martins School of Art and Design.

He is mainly known for designing Björk's iconic swan dress, which the singer wore many times: on the Vespertine album cover, for the Vespertine tour, for the 2000 Cannes Film Festival and for the 73rd Academy Awards. He did not know that she had worn it to the Academy Awards until the following morning.

In 2003, Pejoski launched his own designer brand K-T-Z.

In 2004, Pejoski designed the costumes for Misia's dome tour, the Tour of Misia 2004 Mars & Roses.

In 2014, Pejoski was described by GQ as a favorite among celebrities including ASAP Rocky and Rihanna, K-T-Z's style elevating streetwear silhouettes to global fashion, with a "decidedly niche aesthetic". He regularly uses occult symbolism and gothic influences, and earned controversy for his incorporation of the swastika in prints on clothing and accessories within his fall–winter 2014 collection. He cited sadhu as an inspiration and claimed no ill will in using the symbol.
