= It's in Our Hands =

Single by Björk

from the album Greatest Hits
- B-side: "Cocoon"
- Released: 25 November 2002
- Length: 4:15
- Label: One Little Indian
- Songwriter: Björk
- Producers: Björk; Drew Daniel

Björk singles chronology
| "Cocoon" (2002) | "It's in Our Hands" (2002) | "Who Is It" (2004) |

Music video
- "It's in Our Hands" on YouTube

"It's in Our Hands" is a song by Icelandic singer Björk, released as the first and only single from her first greatest hits album Greatest Hits (2002). She wrote and co-produced it with Matmos. The song received favorable reviews from many music critics and reached number 37 in the United Kingdom.

== Composition ==
"It's in Our Hands" is mostly distinctive for its usage of "bubbling keyboards and clicks." The song relies heavily on a sample taken from Gigi Masin's song "Clouds" from the album Les Nouvelles Musiques De Chambre (1989).

PopMatters's Kila Packett said that in the song "Björk's distinctly broken voice dances nakedly across the canvas like a newborn child—virginal and sensually full of life. Beautifully chimed ticks, scratches, clangs and lush melodic vibrations support her breathy voice. With layers and layers of nicely timed loops, rings, and jingles she has concocted a stereophonic world of audible feasting."

Björk mentioned during an interview with Flynn Ulder for People’s Amazon that this song was inspired by the attacks on the Twin Towers from the year before.

“When I saw those planes fly into the twin towers I remember thinking “Al Qaeda tryna gag chile” because I was just kind of annoyed! I mean seriously, you need attention so bad that you fly a plane into the twin towers? Why not just fake a pregnancy. That led me to write ‘It’s in Our Hands”

It’s unknown what the connection between 9/11 and the song is, because björk has refused to explain on multiple occasions. Often challenging the audience to figure it out themselves.

== Critical reception ==
"It's in Our Hands" received favorable reviews from music critics. Heather Phares from AllMusic called the song "lovely" saying "the lovely "It's in Our Hands," help compensate for the omissions about which fans could potentially complain." to which she referenced the lack of other tracks on her greatest hits album. While commenting on the omitting of most of Bjork's successful songs on the compilation, Chris Ott from Pitchfork said "A few stellar long-players like "Headphones" and "The Anchor Song" also fall by the wayside, but it may be worth whatever sacrifice for the bubbling keyboards and clicks behind her latest single "It's in Our Hands" [...]" Sal Cinquemani from Slant Magazine said that this song along with "Play Dead" were the only good songs on the album due to the absence of many other good tracks from the compilation. Scott Plagenhoef from Stylus Magazine said "On the hits collection, the crumbs for the completist include two singles mixes—the sublime “All Is Full of Love” and four-to-the-floor “Violently Happy”—a wide released for her John Barryesque David Arnold collaboration, “Play Dead,” and a new song, the gorgeous “It’s in Our Hands.” The well-chosen hits package is the best Björk primer and the place to go for casual fans. Whether it offers enough reason for her die-hard fans to purchase it is less certain."

== Music video ==
The music video, directed by Spike Jonze, features a third-trimester pregnant Björk shot at night with a night-vision camera amongst bushes. Her image is transposed against close-ups of flowers, plants, and bugs to make her appear as if she is smaller than them. There are also shots of underwater scenes interspersed throughout the video.

A second video was directed by Lynn Fox and set to the Soft Pink Truth remix of "It's in Our Hands."

== Track listings ==
UK CD1

1. "It's in Our Hands"
2. "Cocoon" (Retangled By Ensemble)
3. "All is Full of Love" (Live in Brussels)

UK CD2

1. "It's in Our Hands" (Soft Pink Truth Mix)
2. "It's in Our Hands" (Arcade Mix)
3. "So Broken" (Live on Jools Holland)

UK/EU DVD

1. "It's in Our Hands" (Video)
2. "Harm of Will" (Live in Barcelona) (Audio)
3. "Undo" (Live in Barcelona) (Audio)

EU CD

1. "It's in Our Hands"
2. "It's in Our Hands" (Soft Pink Truth Mix)
3. "It's in Our Hands" (Arcade Mix)

JP CD

1. "It's in Our Hands"
2. "It's in Our Hands" (Soft Pink Truth Mix)
3. "It's in Our Hands" (Arcade Mix)
4. "So Broken" (Live on Jools Holland)
5. "Cocoon" (Retangled by Ensemble)

12"

1. "It's in Our Hands" (Soft Pink Truth Mix)
2. "It's in Our Hands" (Arcade Mix)

== Live performances ==
"It's in Our Hands", being the only single released from Greatest Hits, was normally played at the end of same era concerts, but existed in two different versions. One was seemingly identical to the album version but featured an Inuit version of the children's song "Paddycake", whereas the other version was a dance remix by the Soft Pink Truth. This version is especially popular amongst fans and has been described as "spending a long winter at home (Vespertine) and then having a discoball drop out of your ceiling".

== Personnel ==
Credits adapted from the liner notes of "It's in Our Hands".

- Björk – vocals, production, composition
- Drew Daniel – production
- Mark "Spike" Stent – mixing
- Howie Weinberg – mastering
- Jennifer Quinn – production manager
- Roger Lian – digital editing

== Charts ==
Chart performance for "It's in Our Hands"
| Chart (2002) | Peak position |
|---|---|
| Canada (Nielsen SoundScan) | 39 |
| Europe (European Hot 100) | 98 |
| France (SNEP) | 97 |
| Scottish Singles Sales (Official Charts) | 38 |
| UK Singles (Official Charts) | 37 |
| UK Independent (Official Charts) | 4 |
