= Eiko Ishioka =

Japanese artist and costume designer (1938–2012)

- Eiko Ishioka by Brigitte Lacombe
- Born: July 12, 1938; Tokyo, Japan
- Died: January 21, 2012 (aged 73); Tokyo, Japan
- Known for: Art direction, costume design, graphic design
- Spouse: Nicholas Soultanakis (m. 2011)
- Awards: Grammy Award for artwork, Academy Award for Best Costume Design, Costume Designers Guild Award

Eiko Ishioka (石岡 瑛子, Ishioka Eiko; July 12, 1938 – January 21, 2012) was a Japanese art director, costume designer, and graphic designer known for her work in stage, screen, advertising, and print media.

Noted for her advertising campaigns for the Japanese boutique chain Parco, she collaborated with sportswear company Descente in designing uniforms and outerwear for members of the Swiss, Canadian, Japanese, and Spanish teams at the 2002 Winter Olympics in Salt Lake City (in collaboration with graphic designer Rafael Esquer) and was the director of costume design for the opening ceremony of the 2008 Summer Olympics in Beijing. She won the Academy Award for Best Costume Design for her work in Francis Ford Coppola's 1992 romantic-horror film Bram Stoker's Dracula, which was based on Bram Stoker's 1897 novel, and received a posthumous nomination in the same category for her work in Tarsem Singh's 2012 fantasy comedy film Mirror Mirror. She was also nominated for three Tony Awards for her set and costume design in M. Butterfly and costume design in Spider-Man: Turn Off the Dark.

== Life and career ==
Ishioka was born in Tokyo to a commercial graphic designer father and a housewife mother. Although her father encouraged her interest in art as a child, he discouraged her desire to follow him into the business. She graduated from the Tokyo National University of Fine Arts and Music. As director of costume design for opening ceremony of 2008 Beijing Olympics, Ishioka found inspiration from art pieces such as Greek statues and African helmets.

== Advertising career ==
Ishioka began her career with the advertising division of the cosmetics company Shiseido in 1961 and won Japan's most prestigious advertising award four years later. Ishioka was discovered by Tsuji Masuda, who created Parco Ikebukuro from the ailing Marubutsu Department Store. When Parco did well and expanded to a Shibuya location in 1973, Ishioka designed Parco Shibuya's first 15-second commercial for the grand opening with "a tall, thin black woman, dressed in a black bikini, dancing with a very small man in a Santa Claus outfit". She became deeply involved in Parco's image. Her last Parco campaign involved Faye Dunaway as "face of Parco" wearing black, on a black chair against a black wall, and peeling and eating an egg in one minute as "a film for Parco." She became its chief art director in 1971; her work there is noted for several campaigns featuring Faye Dunaway and for its open and surreal eroticism. In 1983, she ended her association with Parco and opened her own design firm.

In 2003, she designed the logo for the Houston Rockets.

== Film career ==
In 1985, director Paul Schrader chose Ishioka to be the production designer for his 1985 film Mishima: A Life in Four Chapters. Her work went on to win her a special award for artistic contribution at the Cannes Film Festival that year. Ishioka's work with Francis Ford Coppola on the poster for the Japanese release of Apocalypse Now led to their later collaboration in Coppola's Dracula, which earned Ishioka an Academy Award for Best Costume Design. Ishioka also worked on four of Tarsem Singh's films, beginning with the Jennifer Lopez-starrer The Cell in 2000, and including The Fall, Immortals, and Mirror Mirror.

Ishioka also designed costumes for theater and the circus. In 1999, she designed costumes for Richard Wagner's Der Ring des Nibelungen at the Dutch Opera. She designed costumes for Cirque du Soleil: Varekai, which premiered in 2002, as well as for Julie Taymor's Broadway musical Spider-Man: Turn Off the Dark, which premiered in 2011. She also directed the music video for Björk's "Cocoon" in 2002 and designed costumes for the "Hurricane" tour of singer Grace Jones in 2009.

Ishioka's work is included in the permanent collection of museums throughout the world, including the Museum of Modern Art in New York.

== Filmography ==
Year	Title	Director	Credited as		Notes
Year	Title	Director	Costume Designer	Production Designer	Notes
1985	Mishima: A Life in Four Chapters	Paul Schrader	No	Yes	Also uncredited costume designer
1991	Closet Land	Radha Bharadwaj	Yes	Yes	
1992	Bram Stoker's Dracula	Francis Ford Coppola	Yes	No	
2000	The Cell	Tarsem Singh	Yes	No	with April Napier
2006	The Fall	Tarsem Singh	Yes	No	
2007	Theresa: The Body of Christ	Ray Loriga	Yes	No	
2011	Immortals	Tarsem Singh	Yes	No	
2012	Mirror Mirror	Tarsem Singh	Yes	No	Posthumous release

== Awards and nominations ==
Association	Year (Note: Indicates the year of ceremony. Each year is linked to the article about the awards held that year, wherever possible.)	Category	Work	Result	Ref.
Academy Awards	1993	Best Costume Design	Bram Stoker's Dracula	Won	
Academy Awards	2013	Best Costume Design	Mirror Mirror	Nominated	
British Academy Film Awards	1994	Best Costume Design	Bram Stoker's Dracula	Nominated	
Costume Designers Guild Awards	2013	Excellence in Fantasy Film	Mirror Mirror	Won	
Drama Desk Awards	1988	Outstanding Costume Design	M. Butterfly	Nominated	
Drama Desk Awards	1988	Outstanding Set Design	M. Butterfly	Nominated	
Drama Desk Awards	2012	Outstanding Costume Design	Spider-Man: Turn Off the Dark	Nominated	
Grammy Awards	1987	Best Recording Package	Tutu	Won	
Outer Critics Circle Award	2012	Outstanding Costume Design	Spider-Man: Turn Off the Dark	Won	
Phoenix Film Critics Society Awards	2001	Best Costume Design	The Cell	Nominated	
Saturn Awards	1993	Best Costume Design	Bram Stoker's Dracula	Won	
Saturn Awards	2001	Best Costume Design	The Cell	Nominated	
Tony Awards	1988	Best Costume Design	M. Butterfly	Nominated	
Tony Awards	1988	Best Scenic Design	M. Butterfly	Nominated	
Tony Awards	2012	Best Costume Design of a Musical	Spider-Man: Turn Off the Dark	Nominated	

=== Other recognition ===
- Ishioka was inducted into the Art Directors Club Hall of Fame in 1992.
- Ishioka was honored with a special Google Doodle on July 12, 2017, which would have been her 79th birthday.

== Books ==
The 1990 book Eiko by Eiko collects her work in art direction and graphic design. A second book, Eiko on Stage, followed in 2000.

== Death ==
Ishioka died of pancreatic cancer in Tokyo on January 21, 2012. She married her companion Nicholas Soultanakis in hospital a few months before her death.

== Legacy ==
Her archive has been given to UCLA Library Special Collections.
