= M/M Paris =

Art and design partnership

M/M (Paris) is an art and design partnership consisting of Mathias Augustyniak (born 1967) and Michael Amzalag (born 1968), established in Paris in 1992.

M/M are best known for their art direction and collaborations with musicians (Björk, Madonna, Benjamin Biolay, Etienne Daho, Jean-Louis Murat, Mew, Kanye West); fashion designers (Jonathan Anderson, Sarah Burton, Nicolas Ghesquière, Yohji Yamamoto, Jil Sander, Calvin Klein, Stella McCartney, Riccardo Tisci); magazines (Les Inrockuptibles, Documents sur l'art, Vogue Paris, Purple Fashion, Man About Town); and contemporary artists (Pierre Huyghe, Philippe Parreno, Inez van Lamsweerde & Vinoodh Matadin, Liam Gillick, Sarah Morris, George Condo).

== Biography ==
Augustyniak was born in 1967 in Cavaillon. Amzalag was born in 1968 in Paris. They met as students at the Ecole Nationale Superieure des Arts Decoratifs in Paris in 1988. Amzalag quit school in 1990, and started working as art director at the music magazine Les Inrockuptibles. Augustyniak continued to study at the Royal College of Art in London, graduating in 1991. Since neither of them was interested in interning or working for an agency or a company, they decided to work together, and founded M/M (Paris) in 1992.

Initially, they worked mainly for the music industry, designing record sleeves, but soon they started working in the worlds of fashion and art. Their first fashion assignment was to design the worldwide launch of Yohji Yamamoto's Y's range in 1993. Next, they designed campaigns for Jil Sander and graphics for Martine Sitbon.

In 1995 they met photographers Inez van Lamsweerde & Vinoodh Matadin, and began a long collaboration starting with a campaign for Thierry Mugler in 1995. They created works for Yohji Yamamoto, Balenciaga, Givenchy, Calvin Klein, Björk's sleeves and the video for Hidden Place, and more art-oriented works such as The Alphabet (2001), and The Alphamen (2003), two projects based on creating typography out of portraits of models, which were published in V magazine. Many of the posters M/M designed with van Lamsweerde & Matadin are manipulated or drawn-upon photographs (see e.g. their poster series Punctuation from 2010, or the poster Balenciaga (Delfine)). The purpose of this method is to accentuate hidden aspects of the photograph.

In 2001 they were appointed as art directors and creative consultants to the French edition of Vogue by Carine Roitfeld, until their position was taken over by Fabien Baron in 2003.

Between 1997 and 2001 M/M worked as visiting professors at the École cantonale d'art de Lausanne (ECAL) in Lausanne, Switzerland, holding several student workshops, including the exploration of fashion and identity in Milneufcentseptantesix – Ready made characters for our generation with van Lamsweerde & Matadin, which was exhibited at Espace Lausannois d'Art Contemporain in 2001.

In 2000 M/M collaborated with artists Pierre Huyghe and Philippe Parreno on the "No Ghost Just A Shell" project, and worked again together in 2002 designing the interior of Café Etienne Marcel in Paris.

In 2004 they designed the sets for Éric Vigner staging of the baroque opera Antigona by Tommaso Traetta, out of which they directed the short movie Antigone Under Hypnosis. For his "highly experimental iconography" contribution to the Traetta's Antigone, M/M was awarded in 2017 with the Traetta Prize.

Since 2006, and the "rebirth" of Purple Fashion, they have acted as creative consultants for the magazine and redesigned its visual structure.

Between 2007 and 2009, they worked as creative directors of Arena Homme +, "the world's leading men's fashion magazine".

In January 2008, the Centre Pompidou hosted their first museum retrospective in a show called Vision Tenace, arranged around the presentation of their "Art Posters" series of on-going collaborations with contemporary artists and institutions.

In January 2009, they were appointed as creative directors of Interview Magazine, succeeding Fabien Baron, who unexpectedly left soon after relaunching the magazine. Five months later, in June 2009, they stopped working after Brant Publications, Interview Magazine parent company allegedly in turmoil, failed to pay their fees and expenses for over 3 months.

In October 2009, Taschen released Stanley Kubrick's Napoleon: The Greatest Movie Never Made which M/M had developed for over 2 years, designing a matruschka-like carved-out book containing 10 smaller volumes presenting segments of the research and pre-production of the uncompleted movie.

In September 2010, they released, in collaboration with Swedish brand Byredo, an eau-de-parfum fragrance "M/MINK", inspired by the smell of solid Asian ink they use in their designs. In order to achieve this smell, they chose three pictures concerning ink which they showed to Ben Gorham, the head of Byredo.

In October 2012, Thames & Hudson published M to M of M/M (Paris), a monograph about their work, edited by Emily King, designed by Graphic Thought Facility, with a foreword by Hans-Ulrich Obrist.

In 2022, they designed the book Stanley Kubrick's The Shining.

They were announced as the creative directors of Harper's Bazaar Italia in April 2025, their tenure started from the September 2025 issue.

== Exhibitions ==
Since 1996 they have extended their practice through art exhibitions; and have been included in group shows at Palais de Tokyo (Paris), Solomon R. Guggenheim Museum (New York) and Centre Pompidou (Paris). List of monographic exhibitions:

- 1996: M/M, une exposition; Le Consortium, Dijon.
- 1999: M/M; Y-1, Stockholm.
- 2003: M/M goes to Tokyo; Rocket Gallery, Tokyo
- 2003: Icônes, Indices, Symboles (catalogue available); Festival de Chaumont, Chapelle des Jesuites, Chaumont
- 2003: Nine Posters and a Wallpaper; Le Rectangle, Lyon
- 2004: Antigone en Yvelines; cneai, Chatou
- 2004: Antigone in Asia; Rocket Gallery, Tokyo
- 2004: Antigula (catalogue available); Ursula Blicke Foundation, Kraichtal
- 2005: Zugabe!; Kunstverein, Frankfurt
- 2005: Utopia of Flows; Air de Paris/Art Positions, Art Basel, Miami Beach
- 2006: Haunch of Venison/Venison of Haunch, (catalogue available); Haunch of Venison, London
- 2006: Antigone Under Hypnosis, Paris Calling, V&A, London
- 2008: The Theatre Posters (catalogue available); ggg — Ginza Graphic Gallery, Tokyo
- 2008: L’Île au Trésor, Galerie Air de Paris, Paris
- 2008: Just Like An Ant Walking On The Edge Of The Visible (catalogue available); Drawing Center, New York
- 2008: Vision tenace, Centre Pompidou, Paris
- 2009: Un mot d'amour dans une chambre d'écho, Akbank Sanat, Istanbul
- 2011: Un grand serpent chromé, Les Silos, Chaumont
- 2012: Carpetalogue, Gallery Libby Sellers, London
- 2021: From one M/Museum to another M/M, Musée des Arts Décoratifs Musée d'Orsay, Paris
- 2021: M/Made in Shanghai M/M, Power Station of Art, Shanghai
- 2022: M/Meditation In Copenhagen, LG Strand, Copenhagen
- 2023: The 1001 designs of the ABCD'ORSAY: 26 drawings by MATHIAS AUGUSTYNIAK, Musée d'Orsay, Paris

== Style ==
M/M were initially influenced by post-punk aesthetics as well as the strict Swiss school of graphic design and the more emotional and sensitive Polish School of Posters. Although highly visual, expressive and fashionable, they have an intellectual approach to design. M/M's most well known designs are handdrawn; illustrative and expressive, often applied at, and integrated in, photographs (so called dessin dans l’image, or "drawings in the picture"); first introduced to the public in the Yohji Yamamoto Spring/Summer 1999 catalogue.

== Public collections ==
Their work is featured in the following public collections:

- Bibliothèque Nationale de France, Réserve des livres rares/Collection des estampes, Paris
- Centre National des Arts Plastiques, Paris
- Centre Pompidou, Musée National d'Art Moderne, Paris
- Cneai (Centre National de l'Estampe et de l'Art Imprimé), Chatou
- Design Museum, London
- Fonds national d’art contemporain, Paris
- Guan Shan Yue Art Museum, Shenzhen
- Maison du livre et de l’affiche, Chaumont
- Miami Museum of Contemporary Art, Miami
- Museum für Gestaltung, Zürich
- MMK, Frankfurt-am-Main
- Musée d’art moderne de la ville de Paris, Paris
- Musée National d'Art Moderne, Centre Pompidou, Paris
- Queensland Gallery of Modern Art, Queensland
- Stedelijk Museum, Amsterdam
- Tate Modern, London
- Vanabbemuseum, Eindhoven
