= Hidden Place =

2001 single by Björk

Single by Björk

from the album Vespertine
- B-side: "Verandi"; "Mother Heroic"; "Generous Palmstroke"; "Foot Soldier"
- Released: 30 July 2001
- Recorded: 2000
- Genre: Ambient; glitch pop; trip hop; electronica
- Length: 4:28 (video version); 5:29 (album version)
- Label: One Little Indian; Polydor; Elektra
- Songwriter: Björk
- Producer: Björk

Björk singles chronology
"All Is Full of Love" (1999)	"Hidden Place" (2001)	"Pagan Poetry" (2001)

Music video
- "Hidden Place" on YouTube

"Hidden Place" is a song recorded by Icelandic singer Björk for her fourth studio album Vespertine (2001). Originally intended for the soundtrack album Selmasongs (2000), "Hidden Place" was written and produced by Björk herself, features lyrics centered around a secluded romantic connection, and incorporates an instrumental composition influenced by glitch music.

Released as the lead single from Vespertine on 30 July 2001 by One Little Indian Records, the track was accompanied by a music video directed by art collective M/M (Paris) and photographers Inez and Vinoodh, and portrays a magnified view of liquids streaming through Björk's facial features. "Hidden Place" was critically well-received for its mellowness and usage of a choir, though some found it to be less commercially appealing than her previous work. Topping the single charts in Spain and peaking within the top 20 in Canada, Denmark, Finland, France, and Norway, the song was later featured as the eleventh track on Greatest Hits (2002).

== Background ==
In 2000, while Björk worked on the film Dancer in the Dark, she also began producing her next album, writing new music and teaming with new collaborators; she has said "Selmasongs was the day job and Vespertine was the hobby". Her new relationship with artist Matthew Barney and the tension while filming Dancer in the Dark have been referred to as the two major forces that shaped what would become Vespertine. As the process of filming demanded her to be extroverted, the new music she was creating became hushed and tranquil as a way to escape. Björk commissioned Valgeir Sigurðsson to relocate some of his studio equipment from Iceland to Denmark, where Dancer in the Dark was being filmed. While living in Copenhagen she also contacted the electronic musician Thomas Knak (aka Opiate), after having enjoyed his 1999 album Objects for an Ideal Home. Björk's musical taste shifted from the "clang and clatter" and "thumping techno" that characterized Homogenic, as she "was bored with big beats".

Björk then set to make a record with a domestic mood featuring "everyday moods and everyday noises translating into melodies and beats", hence its working title Domestika. As she wanted to write her own songs in music boxes, Björk contacted a music box company, requesting see-through acrylic glass boxes because she wanted it to sound "as hard as possible, like it was frozen". She also began to use her laptop to write music, and decided to use instruments whose sound would not be compromised when downloaded from sites such as Napster. Björk completed: "I had loads and loads of beats for 'Hidden Place' but it still wasn't up enough. Matthew Herbert came for a visit in the studio and offered to do it. He ran away to his studio and came back after a few hours later with a DAT". She explains the song's title:

'Hidden Place' is sort of about how two people can create a paradise just by uniting. You've got an emotional location that's mutual. And it's unbreakable. And obviously it's make-believe. So, you could argue that it doesn't exist because it's invisible, but of course it does.

== Composition ==
"Hidden Place" features choirs of space sirens, and lyrically is about a new love that has a private side. "I'm not sure what to do with it or where to put it/ I'll keep it in a hidden place", Björk sings. According to The Wire magazine, the song "hints at the extent to which her lyrics parallel their fragile musical arrangements: 'I'm so close to tears and so close to simply calling you up/ I'm simply suggesting/ We go to that hidden place'". For Ryan Schreiber of Pitchfork, the track opens Vespertine with a "glitchy, almost lo-fi melodic loop, paired with the deep sub-bass attack that has dominated the low-end of Björk's music in recent years". MusicOMH's Michael Hubbard noted that it is reminiscent of Björk's previous single "Hunter" (1997), although he felt the beats were not "so central this time round".

== Critical reception ==
"Hidden Place" received positive reviews from music critics. Greg Kot from Blender magazine commented that album openers "Hidden Place" and "Cocoon" "live up to their billing as sound sanctuaries, with Björk singing a barely-above-a-whisper lullaby enhanced by the plush embrace of a choir". David Fricke of Rolling Stone called it "floating beauty". British magazine NME's Joe Logic was also positive saying, "'Hidden Place' is a mellow and low-key opener that combines Matmos sneezing-cricket beats with deep warm bass and a distant choir. The chorus is almost mantra-like, drawing you further into this immeasurably gorgeous record". However, Steve Granlee from The Boston Globe commented that "Hidden Place" was "a subtle update" of "Human Behaviour", but "it won't have any radio appeal". Katy Widder of PopMatters shared a similar sentiment, saying the song "is by no means top 40 material".

== Music video ==
The music video for "Hidden Place" was co-directed by designers M/M (Paris) and photographers Inez and Vinoodh. It was shot in four days in February 2001 in London. It was originally planned for a song from Selmasongs, but Björk felt the project was more appropriate for Vespertine. The video consists of close-up shots panning around Björk's face, as fluids flow in and out of her facial orifices. M/M (Paris) explained the concept behind the video: "We always wanted to get as close to her as we could, as we all felt she had never been portrayed as the "real" and beautiful woman she is. This is somehow taboo, to observe a pop star with no makeup from a distance of half an inch. Then the idea of the liquid works as a visualization of all possible emotions pulsating and circulating in her very busy brain. The loop idea was a main point for us as well, trying to extend the usual time frame of pop video super-fast editing, to make it hypnotising, mesmerising and irritating, like an eternally burning fireplace."

== Track listings ==
UK and European CD1

1. "Hidden Place" (edit)
2. "Generous Palmstroke"
3. "Verandi"

UK and European CD2

1. "Hidden Place" (acappella)
2. "Mother Heroic"
3. "Foot Soldier"

US and UK DVD single

1. "Hidden Place" (video)
2. "Generous Palmstroke"
3. "Verandi"

== Personnel ==
Credits are adapted from the liner notes of Vespertine.

- Björk – vocals, songwriter, producer, bassline, choir arrangement
- Jake Davies – programming, engineering
- Damian Taylor – programming, engineering
- Guy Sigsworth – programming, choir arrangement
- Matthew Herbert – programming
- Matmos – programming
- Vince Mendoza – choir arrangement
- Mark "Spike" Stent – mixing

== Charts ==
=== Weekly charts ===
Chart (2001)	Peak position
Australia (ARIA)	54
Belgium (Ultratip Bubbling Under Flanders)	17
Belgium (Ultratip Bubbling Under Wallonia)	14
Canada (Nielsen SoundScan)	16
Denmark (Tracklisten)	19
Europe (Eurochart Hot 100)	35
Finland (Suomen virallinen lista)	11
France (SNEP)	20
Germany (GfK)	70
Ireland (IRMA)	49
Italy (FIMI)	24
Japan (Oricon)	63
Netherlands (Single Top 100)	60
Norway (VG-lista)	19
Scotland Singles (Official Charts)	29
Spain (Promusicae)	1
Sweden (Sverigetopplistan)	47
Switzerland (Schweizer Hitparade)	77
UK Singles (Official Charts)	21
UK Indie (Official Charts)	1

=== Year-end charts ===
Chart (2001)	Position
Canada (Nielsen SoundScan)	134

== Sales ==
Region	Certification	Certified units/sales
France	—	18,593

== Release history ==
Release dates and formats for "Hidden Place"
Region	Date	Format(s)	Label(s)	Ref.
United Kingdom	30 July 2001	Contemporary hit radio	One Little Indian	
Japan	1 August 2001	CD; DVD	Polydor	
Australia	6 August 2001	CD	Polydor	
Germany	6 August 2001	CD	Polydor	
United Kingdom	6 August 2001	Two CDs; DVD	One Little Indian	
France	7 August 2001	CD	Polydor	
Sweden	13 August 2001	Contemporary hit radio	Polydor	
United States	14 August 2001	DVD	Elektra	
United States	27 August 2001	Adult album alternative radio	Elektra	
United States	28 August 2001	Active rock radio; alternative radio	Elektra	

== Bibliography ==
- Pytlik, Mark (2003). Björk: Wow and Flutter. ECW Press. ISBN 1-55022-556-1.
