= Pagan Poetry =

2001 single by Björk

Single by Björk

from the album Vespertine
- B-side: "Aurora"; "Domestica"; "Batabid"
- Released: 5 November 2001
- Genre: Folktronica; trip hop; avant-folk
- Length: 5:17 (album version); 4:01 (radio edit)
- Label: One Little Indian; Polydor
- Songwriter: Björk
- Producers: Björk; Marius de Vries

Björk singles chronology
"Hidden Place" (2001)	"Pagan Poetry" (2001)	"Cocoon" (2002)

Music video
- "Pagan Poetry" on YouTube

"Pagan Poetry" is a song recorded by Icelandic singer Björk for her fourth studio album Vespertine (2001). (Note: Vespertine is officially considered to be Björk's fourth solo album, although technically it can be viewed as fifth if to count her 1977 juvenilia work, or sixth, counting her 1990 jazz output Gling-Gló.) It was released as the second single from the album on 5 November 2001, by One Little Indian Records. It was a moderate commercial success, the single peaking at number 38 in the United Kingdom and number 15 in Canada.

== Lyrics and recording ==
The song's lyrics, written by Björk, describe the parallels of sexual pleasure and emotional fulfillment found in romantic relationships, both of which are important to her. She recognizes the conflict between the two, wanting both a physically satisfying and faithful relationship while remaining unsure of their mutual obtainability. By the end of the track, she faces the love she has for her partner who makes her "want to hand [herself] over". "Pagan Poetry"’s content also features many metaphors, with the concept of pagan poetry itself representing the emotional complexity of the subject.

Björk had always wanted to work with music boxes, but was waiting for the right occasion. Until then, she had been collecting them and wanted to write her own songs in them. According to her, the music box company were not very excited in the beginning. "They'd made wooden boxes for eons and I wanted see-through plexiglass. They couldn't get their head round it - they were like 'Why?' They wanted to make the plonky sound softer with wood but I wanted it as hard as possible, like it was frozen. In the end, they said it was the best thing they'd ever done". Björk then featured the music box into the song's composition. The song is written and recorded in C sharp minor.

== Critical reception ==
Heather Phares of AllMusic said of "Pagan Poetry" that it "shares a spacious serenity with the album's quietest moments" and included this song as a track pick, while Rolling Stone wrote that in the song, Björk "deploys the implied heaven of Zeena Parkins harp and a flotilla of music boxes with an Asian-teahouse touch." Blender stated that "'Pagan Poetry' sounds like the prelude to a particularly exotic sexual interlude," and Saul Campbell from 7 magazine called the track "terrifying" and an album standout.

In March 2006, on the Spanish edition of Rolling Stone, "Pagan Poetry" was ranked number 38 by Spanish music professionals and experts on a list of the best songs of the 21st century. Pitchfork placed the song at number 227 on its list of "The Top 500 Tracks of the 2000s".

== Music video ==
Björk wearing an in-body-pierced-wedding dress designed by English fashion designer Alexander McQueen in the music video.

The accompanying music video for "Pagan Poetry" was directed by Nick Knight, who had previously photographed the cover image for her third studio album Homogenic (1997). The video is described as being about "a woman preparing herself for marriage and for her lover". It features highly blurry and stylized images of explicit sex from Björk's personal footage, including fellatio and ejaculation, and images of large needles sewing pearls to skin. The second half of the video features Björk in a dress designed by Alexander McQueen. The upper portion of the dress consists of pearls piercing her skin, which is shown throughout the first half. The video ends with a shot of a Corset piercing.

The video had three stages of shooting: A video shoot of piercings, a private video shoot handled by Björk, and a film shoot of Björk. The piercings video and film shoot were done in a day in June 2001 in Knight's studio in London. The studio gave a "northlight" look and had a rawness to it that matched the subject matter, photography director Simon Chaudoir said.

Five young women who were into subculture and piercings were cast for the video. Knight directed Chaudoir to shoot the piercings by and getting as physically near as he could while maintaining a close, macro focus on a wide-angle lens. "It was one of the most difficult things I've ever filmed because I felt I was on the verge of throwing up. I liked to actually only watch it by the video monitor rather than with my eyes as it were because it was just too much", Chaudoir said. Björk also pierced her own ear at the shoot, but all other piercings were the cast girls'.

"I wanted to strip her down. She's actually quite raw, womanly and sexy. There's a different side to her that doesn't come across normally in her videos. That's what I asked her to do and that's what she did. I gave her a Sony Mini DV camera and asked her to shoot her own private scenes ... She asked me to make a film about her love life, so I merely gave it back to her and said, 'Film your love life.'"

— Nick Knight on the video's development.

Tired of music videos which featured the singer looking to the camera and lip-synching throughout, Chaudoir suggested having Björk lip-synch and look into the camera only for some of the last lines. He also suggested using a track so they could move closer to her as she sings these lines or move closer before she sings them—"so it's like a reveal of her". There was no script, so some improvisation made it to the final cut. Blue-screening and CGI work were not involved, "Basically what I was asked to do and what I thought I'd be able to do is more or less there. It would have benefited from being simplified down to a much more bold and direct visualization of what she was trying to do. I think we were too subtle in that", Knight said.

The video was banned by MTV in the United States, but was eventually shown in unedited form on MTV2 in a presentation of the "20 Most Controversial Music Videos". The music video was placed sixth on the "20 Of The Most Controversial Music Videos Ever" list by NME, which described it as "scarier than her dead swan dress or when she punched that photographer". It was also included on the list by Rolling Stone, "The 15 Most NSFW Music Videos of All Time", and was considered by Slant the sixth best music video by Björk. The dress was shown in Björk's MoMA retrospective in 2015. It was sold as part of Kerry Taylor Auctions "Passion for Fashion" sale in London, in June 2016.

On 9 July 2019, Björk uploaded the uncensored music video to her YouTube channel.

== Live performances ==
In 2001, Björk performed "Pagan Poetry" on the Late Show with David Letterman with a Greenland women's choir, harpist, and electronica duo Matmos.

== Track listing ==
UK CD1 and Australian CD single

1. "Pagan Poetry" (video edit)
2. "Pagan Poetry" (Matthew Herbert Handshake Mix)
3. "Aurora" (Opiate version)

UK CD2 and Japanese CD single

1. "Pagan Poetry" (album version) – 5:17
2. "Domestica" – 3:25
3. "Batabid" – 2:26

UK DVD single

1. "Pagan Poetry" (video)
2. "Pagan Poetry" (Matthew Herbert Handshake Mix)
3. "Aurora" (Opiate version)

European CD single

1. "Pagan Poetry" (video edit)
2. "Pagan Poetry" (Matthew Herbert Handshake Mix)

== Charts ==
Weekly chart performance for "Pagan Poetry"
Chart (2001)	Peak position
Australia (ARIA)	106
Canada (Nielsen SoundScan)	15
European Hot 100 Singles (Music & Media)	70
France (SNEP)	49
Italy (FIMI)	20
Portugal (AFP)	4
Scottish Singles Sales (Official Charts)	60
Spain (Promusicae)	6
UK Singles (Official Charts)	38
UK Indie (Official Charts)	5

=== Year-end charts ===
Year-end chart performance for "Pagan Poetry"
Chart (2001)	Position
Canada (Nielsen SoundScan)	197

== Release history ==
Release dates and formats for "Pagan Poetry"
Region	Date	Format(s)	Label(s)	Ref.
Australia	5 November 2001	CD	Polydor	
United Kingdom	5 November 2001	Two CDs; DVD	One Little Indian	
France	6 November 2001	CD	Polydor	
Japan	14 November 2001	CD; DVD	Polydor	
France	1 February 2002	DVD	Polydor	
