= The Volta tour =

2007–08 concert tour by Björk

The Volta Tour
- Tour by Björk
- Associated album: Volta
- Start date: 1 April 2007
- End date: 26 August 2008
- No. of shows: 37 in Europe; 18 in North America; 8 in South America; 6 in Oceania; 7 in Asia; 76 total

Björk concert chronology
- Greatest Hits tour (2003); The Volta Tour (2007–08); Biophilia Tour (2011–13)

The Volta Tour was the sixth concert tour by Icelandic artist Björk. It supported her sixth studio album, Volta (2007). Preceded by an appearance in a benefit concert in Iceland, the 18-month tour began on 9 April 2007 at the Laugardalshöll in Reykjavík and concluded in the same city with a special acoustic showcase at the Langholtskirkja on 26 August 2008. Overall, 48 songs were performed on the tour, focusing on tracks from Debut (1993) through to Medúlla (2004), the latter having not received its own tour. The tour was Björk's first in four years and saw her play countries that she had not played in over ten years. As part of a collaboration with UNICEF, part of the proceeds of the ticket sales was donated to the agency's "Born Free from HIV" campaign.

The tour band consisted of drummer Chris Corsano, musician Mark Bell, who previously accompanied Björk on the Homogenic tour, pianist Jónas Sen, who played celeste on the tracks "Gratitude" and "Cetacea" on the Drawing Restraint 9 soundtrack (2005), musician Damian Taylor, and a 10 piece female Icelandic brass section called the Wonderbrass. The tour instrumentation included the ReacTable, an electro-acoustic music instrument with a tabletop Tangible User Interface, and the Tenori-on.

The tour generated controversy due to several performances of the third single from Volta, "Declare Independence", during which Björk declared political support for various causes, such as Kosovo declaration of independence, the Faroese independence movement and Tibetan independence movement. This latter endorsement prompted the Chinese Ministry of Culture to announce a ban for all entertainers who have ever attended activities that "threaten national sovereignty".

A number of concerts were recorded and broadcast. Voltaïc, a box set consisting in a live album recorded at the Olympic Studios in London, a concert film including performances from Olympia in Paris and the Langholtskirkja, a remixes compilation and music videos, was released on 23 June 2009.

== Background ==
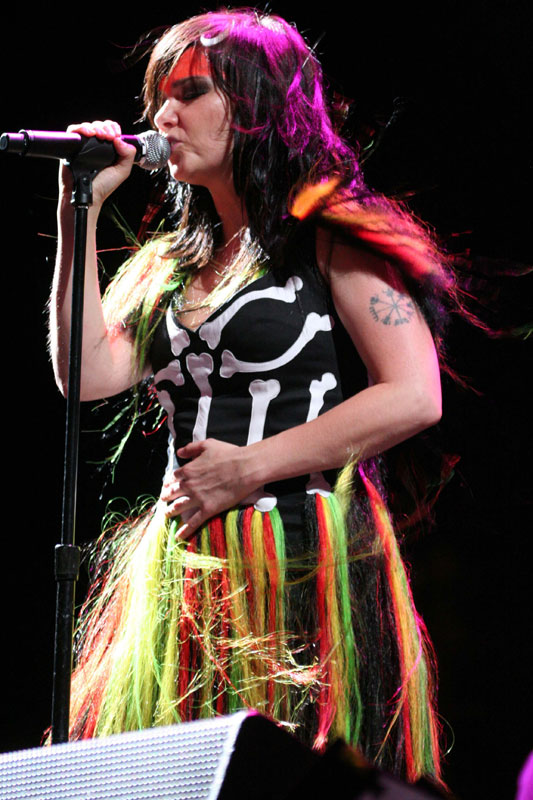
Björk performing at Coachella Festival on 27 April 2007

After some rumours started circulating during 2006, in January 2007, through Björk's official website, it was announced that a new album, the follow-up to her 2004 record Medúlla was being ultimated. Collaborators on the latest output included Timbaland, with whom Björk had collaborated on three songs, Antony and the Johnsons lead singer Anohni, drummers Chris Corsano and Brian Chippendale, African musicians Toumani Diabaté and Konono N°1, Chinese pipa player Min Xiaofen, Mark Bell, who had collaborated with Björk on Homogenic and played with her during the Homogenic tour and Icelandic poet and long-time collaborator Sjón, who had penned a song for the album. Along with the album, a new tour was confirmed to take place in the following months. On 22 January 2007, the first show was confirmed to take place at Coachella Festival, which she already headlined in 2002. Three days later, Björk's performance at Glastonbury Festival was announced. However, it was specified by Glastonbury chief Michael Eavis that she would not be headlining. Between January and February, performances at Roskilde Festival, Open'er Festival, Paléo Festival, Rock Werchter and Sasquatch! Music Festival were confirmed. The first North American leg was announced on 19 March 2007, with shows at Radio City Music Hall, Red Rocks Amphitheatre and Shoreline Amphitheatre.

At the start of the tour, Björk performed three songs at a benefit concert at Club Nasa in Reykjavík on 1 April 2007 for Forma, an Icelandic organisation which deals with people who have eating disorders. Tour rehearsals began shortly before this performance in Iceland. The tour band consisted of Mark Bell on beats, Chris Corsano on drums, Canadian producer Damian Taylor on electronics, Icelandic-Chinese classical pianist Jónas Sen on keyboards and a 10-piece, all-female brass band from Reykjavík called the Wonderbrass. The tour started on 9 April 2007, with a concert at Laugardalshöll in Reykjavík.

Further dates were announced in the Netherlands, Spain, France, Italy, Ireland and Scotland. The second North American leg, which was announced in July 2007, featured a performance at Madison Square Garden, while the South American dates were confirmed in October 2007. It was since 1997 (during the Homogenic tour) that Björk didn't perform in South America. During October 2007, the first dates for 2008 were confirmed, with Björk playing seven shows in Australia and New Zealand for the Big Day Out and Sydney Festival. It was the first time since 1996 that Björk had played in Oceania. Björk had to cancel an appearance in Sydney due to "swelling of the vocal chords [sic]". Further dates were announced in Japan, China, Hong Kong, South Korea, Indonesia and United Kingdom. A show in Sheffield was rescheduled due to health issues. Later appearances included shows at Melt! Festival, Festival Sudoeste, Riga, Ola Festival in Spain, Helsinki, Vilnius, Paris, Verona, Rome, Athens and Istanbul. Björk had to cancel appearances in Helsinki and Sheffield because of problems with her throat and vocal chords. An appearance at Wild in the Country, which was promoted as an exclusive UK festival appearance, was cancelled after Björk had called the event "volatile" and cited problems with staging and lighting. The whole event was cancelled thereafter. On 18 June 2008, it was announced that Björk and Sigur Rós would join and organise a free concert called "Náttúra" in Reykjavík along with Icelandic author Andri Snær Magnason, to raise awareness about the impact of Aluminium smelting activity on Iceland's landscape. The last show of the tour was an acoustic showcase that took place at Langholtskirkja in Reykjavík, in which different songs, not usually performed during the tour were performed, alongside new arrangements of old songs, including "It's Oh So Quiet".

== Controversies ==
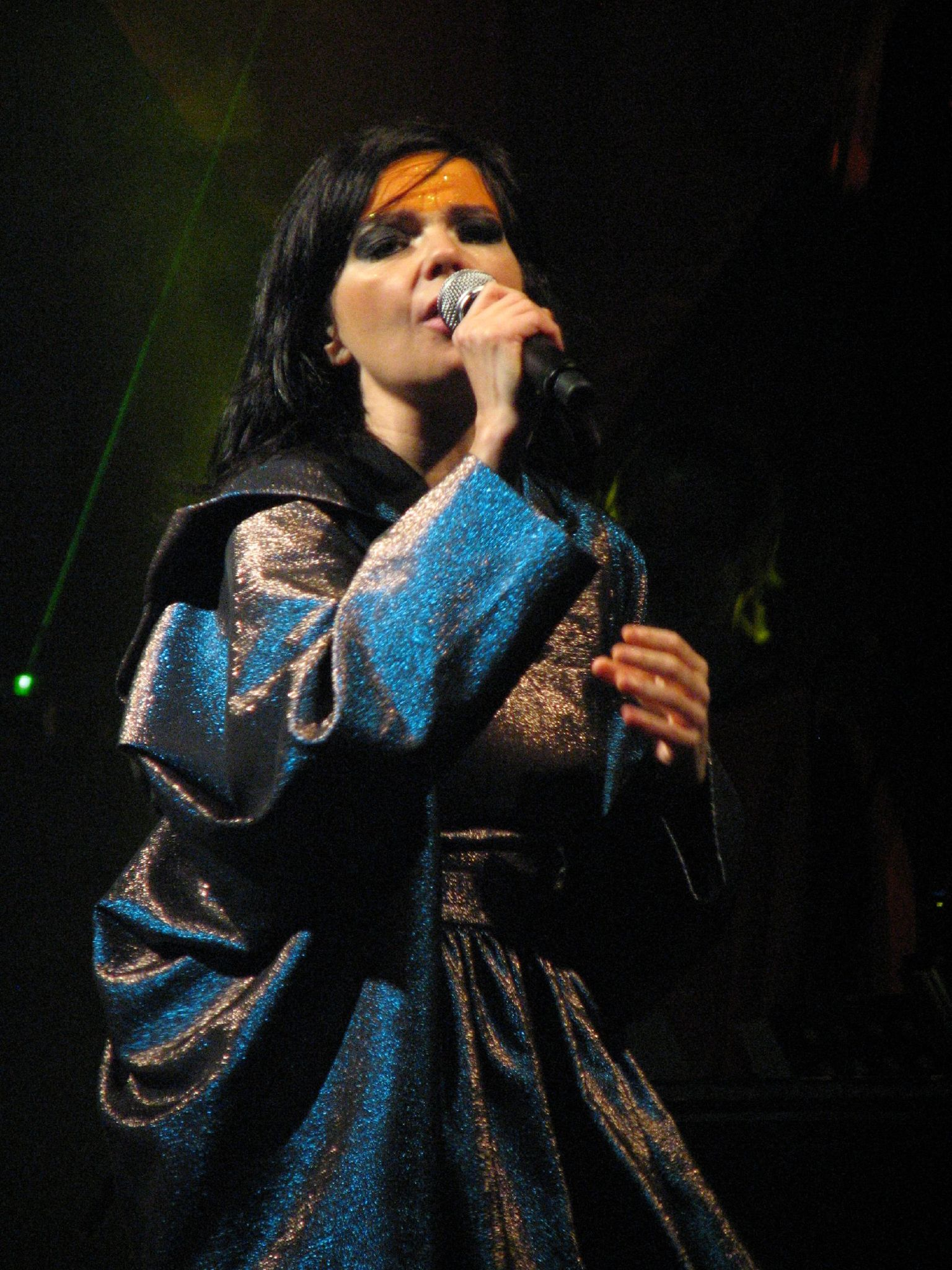
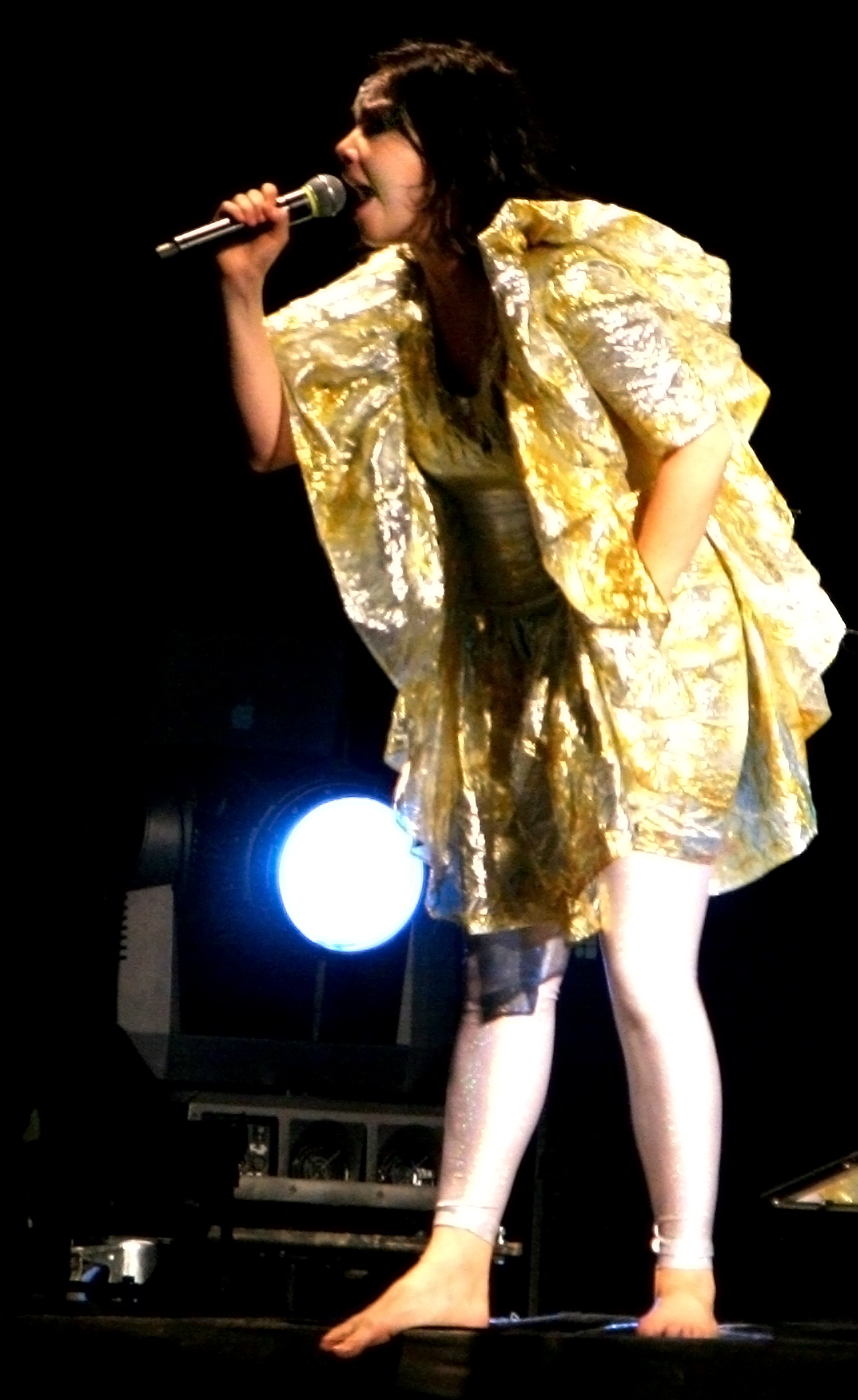
Björk performing at the Deer Lake Park on 23 May 2007 (left) and during Rock en Seine 2007, in a dress designed by Bernhard Willhelm (right).

Björk has used live performances of "Declare Independence" to declare political support for various causes, often to some controversy. At two concerts in Tokyo, Japan she showed her support for Kosovo's declaration of independence. When her upcoming performance at the 2008 Serbian EXIT Festival was cancelled, Björk suggested that "Maybe a Serb attended my concert [in Tokyo] and called home, and therefore the concert in Novi Sad was cancelled." The organizer behind the EXIT Festival denied that Björk's cancellation from the festival was because of her song dedication to Kosovo; that it was actually their inability to guarantee the safety of her fans. Björk's management maintained that the cancellation was because of the dedication, claiming that they had received an email from EXIT Festival saying that they would only allow the concert to go ahead if Björk's management "denied that Björk has ever [dedicated the song to Kosovo]". On 7 March 2008 EXIT festival organiser Bojan Boscovic changed his position and told NME that Björk has an "open invitation" to play at the festival. Björk's dedicating of "Declare Independence" to the Faroe Islands caused some minor controversy in the country.

At a concert in Shanghai, China on 2 March 2008 Björk shouted "Tibet, Tibet!" three times followed by "Raise your flag!" four times during the finale performance of "Declare Independence". Immediately there was an 'uneasy atmosphere' and fans left the venue quickly, and internet forums such as Tianya fielded many negative comments on her statement. China's Ministry of Culture issued a statement denouncing Björk's outburst, and warned that she would be banned from future appearances in China if she repeated such behavior. In an interview, Björk said that she did not "[plan] a trip to China with the purpose of... propaganda" and that Chinese officials "sensationalized" her performance. On 17 July 2008, the Chinese Ministry of Culture announced that artistic groups who "threaten national unity" or "whip up ethnic hatred" among other things during live events would be banned from performing. Fans of Oasis and Bob Dylan, who had previously performed in Tibetan Freedom Concerts, blamed the new regulations for their subsequent denials of permission to perform in Chinese venues.

Many of the live performances from the tour were shot by the audience and uploaded on YouTube, causing Björk to voice her dislike of fans recording video or taking pictures (with flash) at her concerts using their mobile phones ("little cameras"), stating that it affects her ability to perform. On 13 January 2008, Björk attacked a photographer who had photographed her arrival at Auckland International Airport in New Zealand for her scheduled performance at the Big Day Out festival. Björk allegedly tore the photographer's shirt down the back, and in the process she fell to the ground. Neither the photographer nor his employer, The New Zealand Herald, lodged a formal complaint, and Auckland police did not investigate further.

== Broadcasts and recordings ==
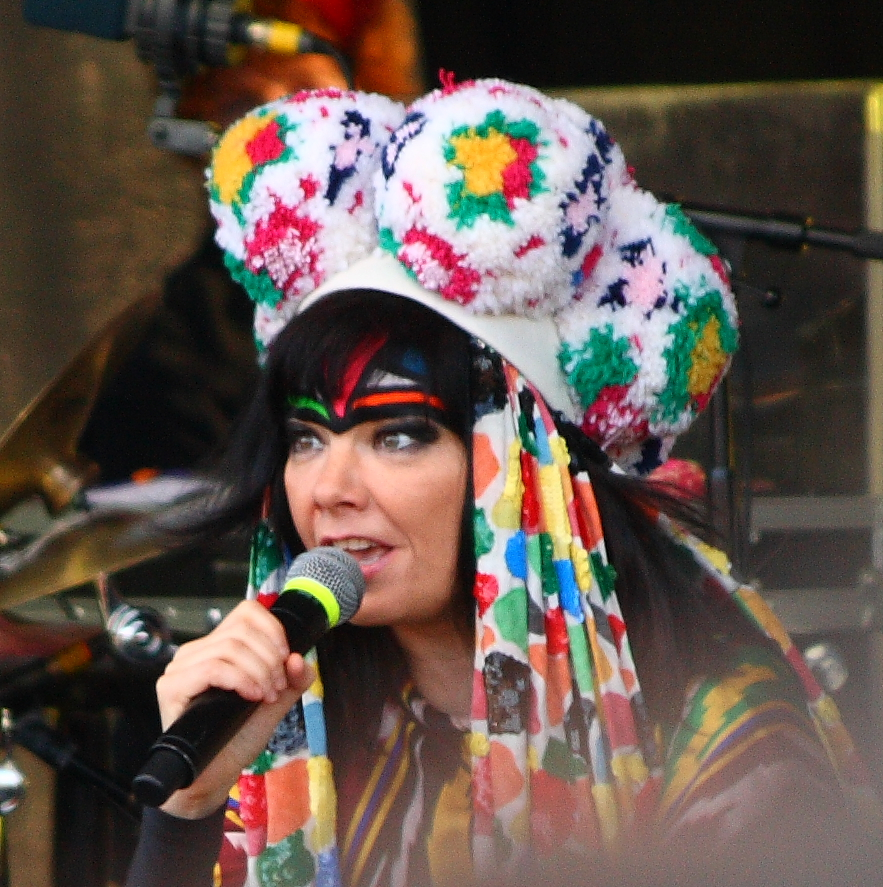
Björk performing "Earth Intruders" at the Náttúra concert in Reykjavík, on 28 June 2008

Several performances from the tour were streamed online. Björk's performance at Coachella was streamed on AT&T Webcasts the day of the show. NPR and WNYC offered a webcast of the show at United Palace Theater. The singer's show at Glastonbury Festival was broadcast on BBC Four. A partial footage from Roskilde Festival was broadcast by MTV. Björk and Sigur Rós headlined free concert "Náttúra" was live streamed by Nat Geo Music.

On 25 June 2007, it was announced on pianist Jonas Sen's tour blog, that a recording session at Olympic Studios in London took place with the band earlier that day. The recording was officially confirmed by Björk's team three months later, on 7 September 2007. It was stated that the recording was intended for a "live session album". When Björk's concert at Olympia in Paris was announced, it was specified that it would be recorded. The acoustic showcase at Langholtskirkja in Reykjavík was also filmed. On 31 January 2009, it was announced that a box set called Voltaïc, which would contain the London live session and both the Paris and Reykjavik shows, along with music videos and remixes, was to be released during the year. The collection, originally bound to a March 2008, release, saw many delays due to a manufacturing error which led to 20,000 copies of the box-set having to be destroyed, and with a remanufacture necessary, Björk decided to make changes to the track listing resulting in four songs being cut from the live DVD. Towards the end of April 2009, Universal Europe accidentally shipped their Deluxe Edition copies of Voltaïc early. A statement released by One Little Indian confirmed that the projected release date was meant to be June 2009 as they wanted all three versions of Voltaïc to be available upon official release. However, UK-based music retailer CD Wow was found to be for a brief period selling un-cut copies of the box set, before its official release. These copies, which had allegedly been destroyed, were manufactured in Malaysia - and as such contained more tracks than the other released (cut) editions. Voltaïc eventually enjoyed its full official release on 23 June 2009. A preview of the DVD was released on YouTube on 16 June 2009, while footage from "Declare Independence" from Paris and "Sonnets/Unrealities XI" from Reykjavík were premiered by Pitchfork and Rolling Stone, respectively. Voltaïc was screened at fifteen theatres throughout the USA to coincide with the North American release, and throughout July 2009, the concert was also shown twice weekly at the Háskólabíó theatre in Reykjavík. Björk herself was present at the first screening.

== Set list ==
=== 2007 ===
This set list is from the 22 June 2007 concert in Pilton, England. It is not intended to represent all concerts for the year.

1. "Earth Intruders" (Note: performed with Konono Nº1 only during the 2–5 May 2007 shows)
2. "Venus as a Boy"
3. "Hunter"
4. "Pagan Poetry"
5. "All Is Full of Love"
6. "Pleasure is All Mine"
7. "Hope" (Note: performed with Toumani Diabaté on select dates)
8. "Jóga"
9. "Army of Me"
10. "I Miss You" (Note: performed with Einar Örn on select dates)
11. "Innocence"
12. "Bachelorette"
13. "5 Years" (Note: performed with Matmos only during the 5 July 2007 show)
14. "Wanderlust"
15. "Hyperballad" (contains elements of "Freak" by LFO)
16. "Pluto"

Encore

17. "Declare Independence"

=== 2008 ===
This set list is from the 25 June 2008 concert in Paris, France. It is not intended to represent all concerts for the year.

1. "Brennið Þið Vitar" (performed by the Wonderbrass)
2. "Earth Intruders"
3. "Hunter"
4. "Immature"
5. "Jóga"
6. "I See Who You Are" (Note: performed with Min Xiao-Fen on select dates)
7. "Pleasure Is All Mine"
8. "Pagan Poetry"
9. "Vertebræ by Vertebræ"
10. "Where Is the Line"
11. "Who Is It"
12. "Oceania"
13. "Desired Constellation"
14. "Army of Me"
15. "Innocence"
16. "Triumph of a Heart"
17. "Bachelorette"
18. "Vökuró"
19. "Wanderlust"
20. "Hyperballad" (contains elements of "Freak" by LFO)
21. "Pluto"

Encore

22. "Declare Independence"

=== Langholtskirkja showcase ===
This set list is from the 26 August 2008 concert in Reykjavík, Iceland.

1. "Overture" (performed by the Wonderbrass)
2. "Pneumonia"
3. "The Anchor Song"
4. "Cover Me"
5. "My Juvenile"
6. "Immature"
7. "The Dull Flame of Desire" (Note: performed with Anohni on select dates)
8. "Vökuró"
9. "Sonnets/Unrealities XI"
10. "Mouth's Cradle"
11. "Oceania"
12. "Who Is It"

Encore

13. "It's Oh So Quiet"

=== Other songs performed ===
Björk rehearsed 48 songs from her discography for the tour and changed set list order for every show. These songs are not included in the set lists reported above.

- "Unravel"
- "Aurora"
- "Unison"
- "It's Not Up To You"
- "Aeroplane"
- "Mother Heroic"
- "Síðasta Ég"
- "Hidden Place"
- "Human Behaviour"
- "Come to Me"
- "Cocoon"
- "Undo"

Appearances

== Tour dates ==
List of 2007 concerts
Date (2007)	City	Country	Venue	Opening act(s)
1 April^{[A]}	Reykjavík	Iceland	Club Nasa	—N/a
9 April	Reykjavík	Iceland	Laugardalshöll	Hot Chip
27 April^{[B]}	Indio	United States	Empire Polo Club	—N/a
2 May	New York City	United States	Radio City Music Hall	Konono Nº1
5 May	New York City	United States	United Palace Theater	Konono Nº1
8 May	New York City	United States	Apollo Theater	Spank Rock
12 May	Chicago	United States	Auditorium Theatre	Ghostigital
15 May	Morrison	United States	Red Rocks Amphitheatre	Joanna Newsom
19 May	Mountain View	United States	Shoreline Amphitheatre	Joanna Newsom; Ghostigital
23 May	Burnaby	Canada	Deer Lake Park	Ghostigital
26 May^{[C]}	George	United States	The Gorge Amphitheatre	—N/a
22 June^{[D]}	Pilton	England	Worthy Farm	—N/a
28 June^{[E]}	Werchter	Belgium	Werchter Festivalpark	—N/a
1 July^{[F]}	Gdynia	Poland	Gdynia-Babie Doły	—N/a
5 July^{[G]}	Roskilde	Denmark	Festivalpladsen	—N/a
8 July	Amsterdam	Netherlands	Westergasfabriek	—N/a
13 July	Bilbao	Spain	Guggenheim Museum Esplanade	—N/a
15 July	Segovia	Spain	La Granja	—N/a
18 July	Madrid	Spain	Las Ventas	—N/a
21 July^{[H]}	Codroipo	Italy	Villa Manin	Ghostigital
25 July^{[I]}	Nyon	Switzerland	Plaine de l'Asse	—N/a
21 August	Nîmes	France	Arena of Nîmes	M.I.A.
23 August	Nîmes	France	Arena of Nîmes	M.I.A.
26 August^{[J]}	Saint-Cloud	France	Domaine national de Saint-Cloud	—N/a
31 August^{[K]}	Stradbally	Ireland	Stradbally Hall	—N/a
2 September^{[L]}	Inveraray	Scotland	Inveraray Castle	—N/a
8 September^{[M]}	Toronto	Canada	Toronto Islands Park	—N/a
11 September	Detroit	United States	Fox Theatre	M.I.A.
14 September^{[N]}	Austin	United States	Zilker Park	—N/a
17 September	Atlanta	United States	Fox Theatre	Santogold
21 September	Montreal	Canada	Jacques-Cartier Pier	—N/a
24 September	New York City	United States	Madison Square Garden	Klaxons; Santogold
26 October^{[O]}	Rio de Janeiro	Brazil	Marina da Glória	—N/a
28 October^{[O]}	São Paulo	Brazil	Arena Skol Anhembi	—N/a
31 October^{[O]}	Curitiba	Brazil	Pedreira Paulo Leminski	—N/a
4 November	Buenos Aires	Argentina	Teatro Gran Rex	—N/a
7 November	Buenos Aires	Argentina	Teatro Gran Rex	—N/a
10 November	Santiago	Chile	Estadio San Carlos de Apoquindo	—N/a
13 November	Lima	Peru	Museo de la Nación	—N/a
17 November	Bogotá	Colombia	Palacio de los Deportes	—N/a
8 December	Guadalajara	Mexico	Huentitán Canyon	—N/a
12 December	Los Angeles	United States	Nokia Theatre	Ratatat
15 December	Paradise	United States	Palms Casino Resort	Ratatat

List of 2008 concerts
Date (2008)	City	Country	Venue	Opening act(s)
18 January^{[P]}	Auckland	New Zealand	Mount Smart Stadium	—N/a
20 January^{[P]}	Gold Coast	Australia	Gold Coast Parklands	—N/a
23 January^{[Q]}	Sydney	Australia	Sydney Opera House Forecourt	—N/a
28 January^{[P]}	Melbourne	Australia	Flemington Racecourse	—N/a
1 February^{[P]}	Adelaide	Australia	Adelaide Showground	—N/a
3 February^{[P]}	Perth	Australia	Claremont Showground	—N/a
12 February	Jakarta	Indonesia	Tennis Indoor Senayan	—N/a
16 February	Seoul	South Korea	Olympic Hall	—N/a
19 February	Tokyo	Japan	Nippon Budokan	—N/a
22 February	Tokyo	Japan	Nippon Budokan	—N/a
25 February	Osaka	Japan	Osaka-jō Hall	—N/a
28 February	Hong Kong		AsiaWorld–Arena	—N/a
2 March	Shanghai	China	Shanghai International Gymnastic Center	—N/a
11 April	Manchester	England	Manchester Carling Apollo	Leila Arab
14 April	London	England	Hammersmith Apollo	Leila Arab
17 April	London	England	Hammersmith Apollo	Leila Arab
20 April	London	England	Hammersmith Apollo	Leila Arab
22 April	Plymouth	England	Plymouth Pavilions	Leila Arab
25 April	Wolverhampton	England	Civic Hall	Leila Arab
28 April	Belfast	Northern Ireland	Waterfront Hall	Leila Arab
1 May	Blackpool	England	Empress Ballroom	Leila Arab
25 June	Paris	France	Olympia	—N/a
28 June^{[R]}	Reykjavík	Iceland	Laugardalur Park	—N/a
13 July	Vilnius	Lithuania	Vingis Park	Jurga Šeduikytė
16 July	Riga	Latvia	Arena Riga	Cosmos
20 July^{[S]}	Gräfenhainichen	Germany	Ferropolis	—N/a
25 July	Rome	Italy	Auditorium Parco della Musica	Ricardo Villalobos
28 July	Verona	Italy	Verona Arena	—N/a
31 July	Athens	Greece	Olympic Sports Hall	—N/a
3 August	Istanbul	Turkey	Turkcell Kuruçeşme Arena	—N/a
7 August^{[T]}	Zambujeira do Mar	Portugal	Herdade da Casa Branca	—N/a
15 August^{[U]}	El Ejido	Spain	Playa de Guardias	—N/a
26 August^{[V]}	Reykjavík	Iceland	Langholtskirkja	—N/a

=== Festivals and miscellaneous performances ===
^{A} Part of Forma charity concert, billed as a "warm-up" show
^{B} This concert was a part of Coachella Festival
^{C} This concert was a part of Sasquatch! Music Festival
^{D} This concert was a part of Glastonbury Festival
^{E} This concert was a part of Rock Werchter
^{F} This concert was a part of Open'er Festival
^{G} This concert was a part of Roskilde Festival
^{H} This concert was a part of No Borders Music Festival
^{I} This concert was a part of Paléo Festival
^{J} This concert was a part of Rock en Seine
^{K} This concert was a part of Electric Picnic

^{L} This concert was a part of Connect Music Festival
^{M} This concert was a part of Virgin Festival
^{N} This concert was a part of Austin City Limits Music Festival
^{O} These concerts were part of TIM Festival
^{P} These concerts were part of Big Day Out
^{Q} This concert was a part of Sydney Festival
^{R} Free charity concert billed as "Náttúra", organized with Sigur Rós
^{S} This concert was a part of Melt! Festival
^{T} This concert was a part of Festival Sudoeste
^{U} This concert was a part of Ola Festival
^{V} Special acoustic showcase

=== Cancellations and rescheduled shows ===
25 January 2008	Sydney, Australia	Big Day Out	Cancelled due to "swelling vocal chords."
4 May 2008	Sheffield, England	Sheffield City Hall	Postponed due to health issues. Rescheduled to 2 July 2008, and ultimately cancelled due to "ongoing throat problems."
5 July 2008	Hertfordshire, England	Wild in the Country	Cancelled because of problems with the staging, sound and lighting. Björk has called the event "volatile."
10 July 2008	Helsinki, Finland	Finlandia Puisto	Cancelled due to "medical issues with her voice."
10-13 July 2008	Novi Sad, Serbia	Exit Festival	Cancelled due to political controversies.

== Awards and nominations ==
=== Meteor Ireland Music Awards ===
Year	Nominee / work	Award	Result	Ref.
2008	Volta Tour live at Electric Picnic	Best International Live Performance	Nominated	

== Personnel ==
All credits adapted from Voltaïc.

- Björk – vocals
- Damian Taylor – musical director (except first and last shows in Reykjavík)
- Mark Bell – computers and keyboards (except first show in Reykjavík)
- Jónas Sen – keyboards
- Chris Corsano – drums and percussion (except first and last shows in Reykjavík)
- Wonderbrass – horns
  - Erla Axelsdóttir – french horn
  - Brynja Guðmundsdóttir – tuba
  - Sylvía Hlynsdóttir – trumpet
  - Harpa Jóhannsdóttir – trombone
  - Sigrún Jónsdóttir – trombone
  - Sigrún Kristbjörg Jónsdóttir – trombone
  - Björk Níelsdóttir – trumpet
  - Særún Ósk Pálmadóttir – french horn
  - Bergrún Snæbjörnsdóttir – french horn
  - Valdís Þorkelsdóttir – trumpet
- Choir (only during last show in Reykjavík)
  - Brynja Guðmundsdóttir – soprano
  - Hugrún R. Hólmgeirsdóttir – soprano
  - Inga Harðardóttir – soprano
  - Heiða Árnadóttir – soprano
  - Margret Sigurðardóttir – soprano
  - Jónína Guðrún Kristinsdóttir – soprano
  - Guðrún Edda Gunnarsdóttir – alto
  - Guðrún Finnbjarnardóttir – alto
  - Sólveig Samúelsdóttir – alto
  - Hildigunnur Einarsdóttir – alto
  - Aðalheiður Þorsteinsdóttir – alto
  - Guðmundur Vignir Karlsson – tenor
  - Björn Thorarensen – tenor
  - Magnús Ragnarsson – tenor
  - Þorbjörn Sigurðsson – tenor
  - Benedikt Ingólfsson – bass
  - Hugi Jónsson – bass
  - Þorvaldur Þorvaldsson – bass

=== Stage, audio and technical ===
- Shaun Martin – tour manager
- Jennifer George – Björk PA
- Andrea Helgadottir – Björk make up
- Rosemary Llagostera – Björk wardrobe
- Thelma Björk Johannesdottir – Björk nanny
- Peter van der Velde – production manager
- Kevin Pruce – FOH sound engineer
- Bob Lopez – monitor sound engineer
- Paul Normandale – lighting designer
- Jez Webb – backline technician
- Alan Pollard – backline technician
- Chris Taplin – stage manager
- Tracy Fraser – production assistant
- Richard Brisson – laser and pyro assistant
- Ken Schmitt – laser technician
- Andy Squibb – sound technician
- Rob Priddle – sound technician
- Richard Cook – sound technician
- Dave Jolly – lighting technician
- Graham Feast – lighting technician
- Stevie Marr – lighting technician
- Andrew Wooderson – harpsichord tuner
- Edmund Handy – harpsichord tuner
- Graham Butler – truck driver
- Robert “Ratty” Quinn – truck driver
- Roy Ladds – truck driver
- Ragga Gestsdottir – Björk PA (2007)
- Helga Fridriksdottir – Björk nanny (2007)
- Numi Thomasson – Björk chef (2007)
- Anthony Cairns – on tour video director
- Mark Dawson – Björk security
- Richard Gibson – sound technician
- Emmanuelle George – Björk wardrobe
- Nick Mooney – sound technician
- Nick Davis – sound technician
- Chris Hill – wigwam audio
- Geoff Muir – wigwam audio
- Jon Greaves – lite alt lighting
- David and Sue Steinberg – stardes trucking
- Des Fallon – XL video
- Valdis Dauksts – XL video
- Rebecca and Abby Yunke – strickly FX
- Ted Maccabee – strickly FX
- Mark Greka – strickly FX
- Alan Durant – rockit cargo
- Bill Good – rockit cargo
- Maureen Scott – vocal coach
- Sergi Jorda – reactable
- Marco Alonso – reactable
- Gunter Geiger – reactable
- David Cushion – accountant
- Patrick Templeman – US accountant
- Tom Arko – eight day sound
- Jordan Zur – eight day sound
- John Bahnink – upstaging lighting
- Chanon DiCarlo – upstaging lighting
- Mark and Paula Turner – MTFX
- David Levy – William Morris Agency
- Karey Fisher – William Morris Agency
- Sam Kirby – William Morris Agency
- Doug Singer – William Morris Agency
- Vicky Leviten – Music Travel Agency
- Sarah Howden – Music Travel Agency
- Jennifer Chiara – Linden Travel
- Paul Hattin – Phoenix Busing
- Mark Larson – Hemphill Brothers
