= Voltaïc =

Box set by Björk
- Released: 23 June 2009
- Recorded: 25 June 2007 (Olympic Studios); 25 June 2008 (Paris, France); 26 August 2007 (Reykjavík, Iceland)
- Venues: Olympia (Paris, France); Langholtskirkja (Reykjavík, Iceland)
- Studio: Olympic Studios
- Length: 278:09
- Labels: One Little Indian; Polydor; Nonesuch; Warner Bros.
- Directors: Russell Thomas (Live in Paris); Hreinn Beck (Live in Reykjavík)
- Producers: Andy Derbyshire; Spin; (The Volta Tour)

Björk chronology
Volta (2007)	Voltaïc (2009)	Mount Wittenberg Orca (2010)

CD edition

CD and DVD edition

Professional ratings
Aggregate scores
Source	Rating
Metacritic	75/100
Review scores
Source	Rating
AllMusic	CD; CD–DVD; 2 CD + 2 DVD
The A.V. Club	B+
Entertainment Weekly	B+
The New York Times	mixed
Pitchfork	5.2/10
PopMatters	7/10 stars
Robert Christgau	(3-star Honorable Mention)

Voltaïc is a 2009 compilation of material related to the 2007 album Volta by the Icelandic musician Björk. The full version of the release includes a CD of eleven songs performed live at the Olympic Studios, a DVD of Björk's live performances in Paris and Reykjavík during the Volta tour, a second DVD of the Volta music videos as well as videos of the top ten runners-up from the "Innocence" video contest, and a second CD of remixes from Volta's singles. The worldwide release date of all editions was 23 June 2009. The artwork was nominated for an award at the 2010 Brit Insurance Design Awards.

== Release history ==
The release was subject to numerous delays, mostly due to manufacturing problems. The first mention of the release of live material from the Volta tour was made through an announcement made on Björk's official website regarding a "Live Session Album" made at Olympic Studios, London. This was then followed by online stores adding to their pages a release titled "Volta Revisited" in February 2008, with projected (and incorrect) release dates of April/May 2008 listed. An email from Derek Birkett, head of One Little Indian, stated the proposed contents of the release, meant to 'tie-up' the Volta campaign. The release was originally not going to include a live DVD, but amongst those items that did not make the final release were the online blips made as part of the viral marketing campaign for Volta, the EPK interview that was used in the Volta podcasts available on the iTunes Store, and an unreleased "AOL Online session".

Björk then filmed a concert at L'Olympia in Paris, France during the last leg of the Volta tour and a small concert in Reykjavík, Iceland straight after the tour had finished. The "Volta Revisited" collection eventually surfaced as Voltaïc and was to include a live DVD among 3 other discs, although manufacturing problems led to a delay of up to six months for its release. One manufacturing error led to 20,000 copies of the box-set having to be destroyed, and with a remanufacture necessary, Björk decided to make changes to the track listing resulting in four songs being cut from the live DVD. Towards the end of April 2009 Universal Europe accidentally shipped their copies of Voltaïc early. A statement released by One Little Indian stated that the projected release date was meant to be June 2009 as they wanted all three versions of Voltaïc to be available upon official release – the early shipment by Universal Europe was only of the Deluxe Edition. However, UK-based music retailer CD Wow was found to be for a brief period selling un-cut copies of the box set, before its official release. These copies, which had allegedly been destroyed, were manufactured in Malaysia – and as such contained more tracks than the other released (cut) editions. Voltaïc eventually enjoyed its full official release on 23 June 2009.

Björk was ill on the night of the Paris concert and later described the recording as being "quite traumatic" as her voice was not in good condition at this late point during the tour. Because of this, some small parts of Björk's vocals in the Paris concert were edited in post-production, for example in the performance of "Where Is The Line". The Reykjavík concert shows her voice in much better condition. It is notable that both "My Juvenile" and "Pneumonia" were only performed live during the Reykjavík concert – all the other songs were performed throughout the Volta tour.

The originally announced track listing for the Voltaïc Live DVD contained more tracks than those which appear on the final release. "Triumph of a Heart" was cut from the Paris concert, while "Cover Me", "Immature", "It's Oh So Quiet", "Who is It?", "Sonnets/Unrealities XI" and "The Dull Flame of Desire" were cut from the Reykjavík concert. Additional 'cut' songs were performed at each respective concert but were never featured on any track lists for the box-set, e.g. "Oceania". "Brennið Þið Vitar" is the walk-in played by the brass band, and is a traditional Icelandic choral piece.

== Theatre screenings ==
Voltaïc was screened at fifteen theatres throughout the USA to coincide with the North American release on 23 June 2009.

- June 17 Boulder, CO Boulder Theater
- June 19, 20 Anchorage, AK Bear Tooth Theater
- June 19–21 Portland, OR Hollywood Theatre
- June 20 Philadelphia, PA 941 Theater
- June 23 New York, NY School of Visual Arts Theater
- June 23 Los Angeles, CA The Montalban Theater
- June 23 Madison, WI The Orpheum Stage Door
- June 23–28 Oxford, MS The Amp
- June 23–28 Lake Geneva, WI Geneva Theater
- June 24 Minneapolis, MN The Trylon Microcinema
- June 26, 27 Seattle, WA Northwest Film Forum
- June 26, 27 San Francisco, CA The Roxie
- June 26, 27 Bellingham, WA Pickford Film Center
- June 26, 27 New Orleans, LA Zeitgeist Arts Center
- July 20 Austin, TX Alamo Drafthouse Ritz

Throughout July 2009 the concert was also shown twice weekly at the Háskólabíó theatre in Reykjavík. Björk herself was present at the first screening.

== Formats ==
Voltaïc is released in five different editions:

- CD (the Olympic Studio session)
- CD+DVD Deluxe Edition (containing the Volta Tour Live DVD and the Olympic Studio session on CD)
- Standard/Limited Edition (containing the Volta Tour Live DVD, Volta Videos DVD, Olympic Studio session CD, and Volta Mixes CD)
- Deluxe Vinyl Edition (3 vinyls, 2 CDs and 2 DVDs)

However, only the North American release (on Nonesuch Records) will feature all five different versions – the UK and European releases exclude the CD and CD+DVD editions. Both CDs (Live CD and Remix CD) are also available as digital downloads.

== Track listing ==
Songs from The Volta Tour Performed Live at the Olympic Studios – CD
No.	Title	Writer(s)	Length
1.	"Wanderlust"	Björk; Sjón	5:47
2.	"Hunter"	Björk	4:19
3.	"Pleasure Is All Mine"	Björk	3:20
4.	"Innocence"	Björk; Timbaland; Danja	4:00
5.	"Army of Me"	Björk; Graham Massey	4:20
6.	"I Miss You"	Björk; Howie B	3:30
7.	"Earth Intruders"	Björk; Timbaland; Danja	3:52
8.	"All Is Full of Love"	Björk	4:05
9.	"Pagan Poetry"	Björk	5:14
10.	"Vertebræ by Vertebræ"	Björk	5:09
11.	"Declare Independence"	Björk; Mark Bell	4:18
Total length:			47:54

The Volta Tour Live in Paris and Reykjavík – DVD
No.	Title	Writer(s)	Length
1.	"Brennið þið vitar" (performed by The Wonderbrass)		1:01
2.	"Earth Intruders"	Björk; Timbaland; Danja	3:55
3.	"Hunter"	Björk	4:27
4.	"Immature"	Björk	2:50
5.	"Jóga"	Björk; Sjón	4:38
6.	"Pleasure Is All Mine"	Björk	3:42
7.	"Vertebræ by Vertebræ"	Björk	5:09
8.	"Where Is the Line"	Björk	4:48
9.	"Who Is It"	Björk	4:02
10.	"Desired Constellation"	Björk; Olivier Alary	4:41
11.	"Army of Me"	Björk; Massey	4:25
12.	"Bachelorette"	Björk; Sjón	5:31
13.	"Wanderlust"	Björk; Sjón	5:53
14.	"Hyperballad"	Björk	4:52
15.	"Pluto"	Björk; Bell	4:40
16.	"Declare Independence"	Björk; Bell	5:28
17.	"Pneumonia"	Björk	5:41
18.	"My Juvenile"	Björk	3:53
19.	"Vökuró"	Jórunn Viðar; Jakobína Sigurðardóttir	3:40
20.	"Sonnets / Unrealities XI"	Björk; E. E. Cummings	2:14
21.	"Mouth's Cradle"	Björk	4:12
Total length:			89:42

The Volta Videos – DVD
No.	Title	Director(s)	Length
1.	"Earth Intruders"	Michel Ocelot	3:58
2.	"Declare Independence"	Michel Gondry	4:23
3.	"Innocence"	Fred & Annabelle	4:28
4.	"Wanderlust"	Encyclopedia Pictura	7:36
5.	"The Dull Flame of Desire" (featuring Anohni)	Christoph Jantos; Masahiro Mogari; Marçal Cuberta Junca	5:58
6.	"The Making of Declare Independence"		5:30
7.	"The Making of Wanderlust"		4:22
8.	"Innocence"	Davood Saghiri	4:31
9.	"Innocence"	Dimitri Stankowicz	4:12
10.	"Innocence"	Étienne Strube	1:19
11.	"Innocence"	Julien Himmer	1:13
12.	"Innocence"	Laurent Labouille	3:57
13.	"Innocence"	Mario Caporali	4:29
14.	"Innocence"	Mik o_o Armellino	4:29
15.	"Innocence"	Renato Klieger; Terracotta	4:07
16.	"Innocence"	Roland Matusek	4:11
Total length:			68:43

The Volta Mixes – CD
No.	Title	Writer(s)	Remixer(s)	Length
1.	"Earth Intruders"	Björk; Timbaland; Danja	XXXChange	4:38
2.	"Innocence"	Björk; Timbaland; Danja	Simian Mobile Disco	7:47
3.	"Declare Independence"	Björk; Bell	Matthew Herbert	5:23
4.	"Wanderlust"	Björk; Sjón	Ratatat	5:26
5.	"The Dull Flame of Desire" (featuring Anohni)	Björk; Fyodor Tyutchev	Modeselektor (Remix for Girls)	6:19
6.	"Earth Intruders"	Björk; Timbaland; Danja	Lexx	6:41
7.	"Innocence"	Björk; Timbaland; Danja	Graeme Sinden	4:32
8.	"Declare Independence"	Björk; Bell	Ghostigital	2:51
9.	"The Dull Flame of Desire" (featuring Anohni)	Björk; Tyutchev	Modeselektor (Remix for Boys)	5:24
10.	"Innocence"	Björk; Timbaland; Danja	Alva Noto (Unitxt Remodel)	6:16
11.	"Declare Independence"	Björk; Bell	Black Pus	8:47
12.	"Innocence"	Björk; Timbaland; Danja	Simian Mobile Disco (Dub)	7:46
Total length:				71:50

Notes

- Songs from the Volta Tour Performed Live at the Olympic Studios:
  - The North American iTunes Store version includes "My Juvenile" as a bonus track.
- The Volta Tour Live in Paris and Reykjavík:
  - Videos 1–16 are subtitled "live in Paris"; videos 17–21 are subtitled "live in Reykjavík".
  - The Malaysian first pressing edition includes "Triumph of a Heart" (live in Paris); "Cover Me", "Immature" and "The Dull Flame of Desire" (live in Reykjavík).
- The Volta Videos:
  - Videos 8-16 are the "Innocence" video competition top ten runners up.
- The Volta Mixes:
  - Only the Black Pus Remix of "Declare Independence" was previously unreleased, the others were included in the respective single releases.

== Charts ==
Chart (2008–09)	Peak position
Belgium Albums Chart	80
Japan Albums Chart (Oricon)	163
Spanish DVD Chart	9
U.S. Billboard 200	118
U.S. Billboard Top Rock Albums	44
