= Volta (album) =

2007 studio album by Björk

Studio album by Björk
- Released: 1 May 2007
- Recorded: 2005–2007
- Studios: Sony Music, the Looking Glass (New York City); Olympic, Pierce Rooms (London); Geejam (Portland, Jamaica); Studios Caraïbes (Brussels); Studios Bogolan (Bamako)
- Genres: Electropop; experimental; world; avant-pop
- Length: 51:16
- Label: One Little Indian
- Producers: Björk; Timbaland; Danja; Mark Bell; Damian Taylor

Björk chronology
Surrounded (2006)	Volta (2007)	Voltaïc (2009)

Alternative cover
- Hispanic American, East European and Universal special editions and Universal Music Indonesia standard editions cover

Singles from Volta
- 1. "Earth Intruders" Released: 9 April 2007; 2. "Innocence" Released: 23 July 2007; 3. "Declare Independence" Released: 1 January 2008; 4. "Wanderlust" Released: 12 June 2008; 5. "The Dull Flame of Desire" Released: 29 September 2008

Volta is the sixth studio album by the Icelandic singer Björk, (Note: Volta is officially considered to be the sixth studio album, although technically it can be viewed as seventh if counted her 1977 juvenilia work, or eighth, counting in her 1990 output Gling-Gló.) released on 1 May 2007 by One Little Indian. It features contributions from multiple artists, including Björk's longtime collaborator Mark Bell and the producers Timbaland and Danja.

The album received positive reviews and is Björk's first and only album to reach the top 10 on the US Billboard 200, peaking at number nine. Volta spent nine weeks at number one on the US Top Electronic Albums chart and in the first three months of release sold over half a million copies worldwide. In the United Kingdom it was certified silver. The lead single, "Earth Intruders", reached number 67 on the UK Official Download Chart, and number 78 on the main UK Singles Chart, while the remix EP later charted on its own at number 150. In the United States, the song became her second entry on the US Billboard Hot 100 at number 84. Volta was nominated for Best Alternative Music Album at the 50th Annual Grammy Awards.

The album was re-released in June 2009 in expanded versions, under the name Voltaïc. There were five separate versions of related material from Volta. The full version included a CD of 11 songs performed live at the Olympic Studios, a DVD of live performances in Paris and Reykjavík during the Volta tour, a second DVD of the Volta music videos, videos of the top ten runners-up from the "Innocence" video contest, and a second CD of remixes from Volta's singles. The official worldwide release date of all editions was 23 June 2009. The artwork was nominated for an award at the 2010 Brit Insurance Design Awards. It was a collaboration between the German fashion designer Bernhard Willhelm and British fashion photographer Nick Knight. Björk went on the 18-month The Volta tour, her first tour in four years.

== Background and development ==
In an interview with Pitchfork, Björk talked for the first time about the theme of the album.

But with this one, it was different because I knew more emotionally what I wanted. And because I'd done two or three projects in a row that were quite serious, maybe I just needed to get that out of my system or something. So all I wanted to do for this album was just to have fun and do something that was full-bodied and really up.

In the run-up to the release of the album, many media outlets were lauding the album as a return to the supposed "pop" sound of Björk's earlier solo albums Debut and Post. This was due in part to the inclusion of three tracks co-produced by record producer Timbaland; in interviews before the album's release he had stated that seven of the tracks he worked with Björk on would end up on her album, seemingly indicating that the decision was made to choose other tracks than the Timbaland-produced ones, or else other versions of the tracks. At the time Timbaland had also had recent hits with Justin Timberlake ("SexyBack") and Nelly Furtado ("Promiscuous" and "Maneater"), with him and his protégé Danja being responsible for some of the biggest hits of 2006 and 2007. As the news of Björk's having worked with Timbaland spread across the Internet, many websites started speculating on whether the album would be "hip hop" flavoured; in one interview Timbaland himself referred to the upcoming album as "hip hop".

It's crazy – I'm going tonight to go hear it. It's hip hop. I can't really describe it to you – if I had it right now I'd just play it to you. That's the best way for you to understand, and I'd let you tell me what it is.

Pitchfork, in their exclusive first interview with Björk for the promotion of Volta, quoted Björk as saying that the new album would be "full-bodied and really up". This was taken by fans as further evidence of a more "pop" album (as compared to her more recent output). A week later, the head of One Little Indian Records, Derek Birkett, heralded the new album as "the most commercial thing she's ever done" in Music Week.

The first mention of "Earth Intruders" as a song title was made on All Access on 10 March 2007, and was later confirmed as the lead single through an article in The Guardian on 11 March 2007. On 26 March 2007, a distorted sample of the song was uploaded to YouTube as part of the viral marketing campaign for the Volta album. A fifteen-second sample of the track then appeared on the Rhino Records online ringtone website on 1 April 2007. The purchased ringtone featured a different clip (with different lyrics) to the one used in the online preview on the site; both audio samples were subsequently spread across online music forums. On 3 April 2007, it was reported that the Björk section of the Rhino Records online ringtone store had been removed. After internet radio station WOXY played the song on 6 April 2007, the song was made widely available across file-sharing networks.

Björk has since stated that the album was not "hip hop" and that she had not intended for it to be so. She said that she did not want to work with Timbaland as a "hitmaker", or because of his affiliation to a particular genre, but wanted to work with him solely as a musician in his own right. Björk has also explained that when the two of them were together, Timbaland asked Björk what kind of music she would like to make with him, for example a hit song or "something weird", and Björk replied that she was interested in finding out where they "overlapped" musically, and they would go from there. The result was a tribal sound, because they were both interested in it. She has also said that One Little Indian "always feel that 'my latest release is the most commercial to date'", and that she feels Volta is no more commercial than any of her previous work.

== Recording and production ==
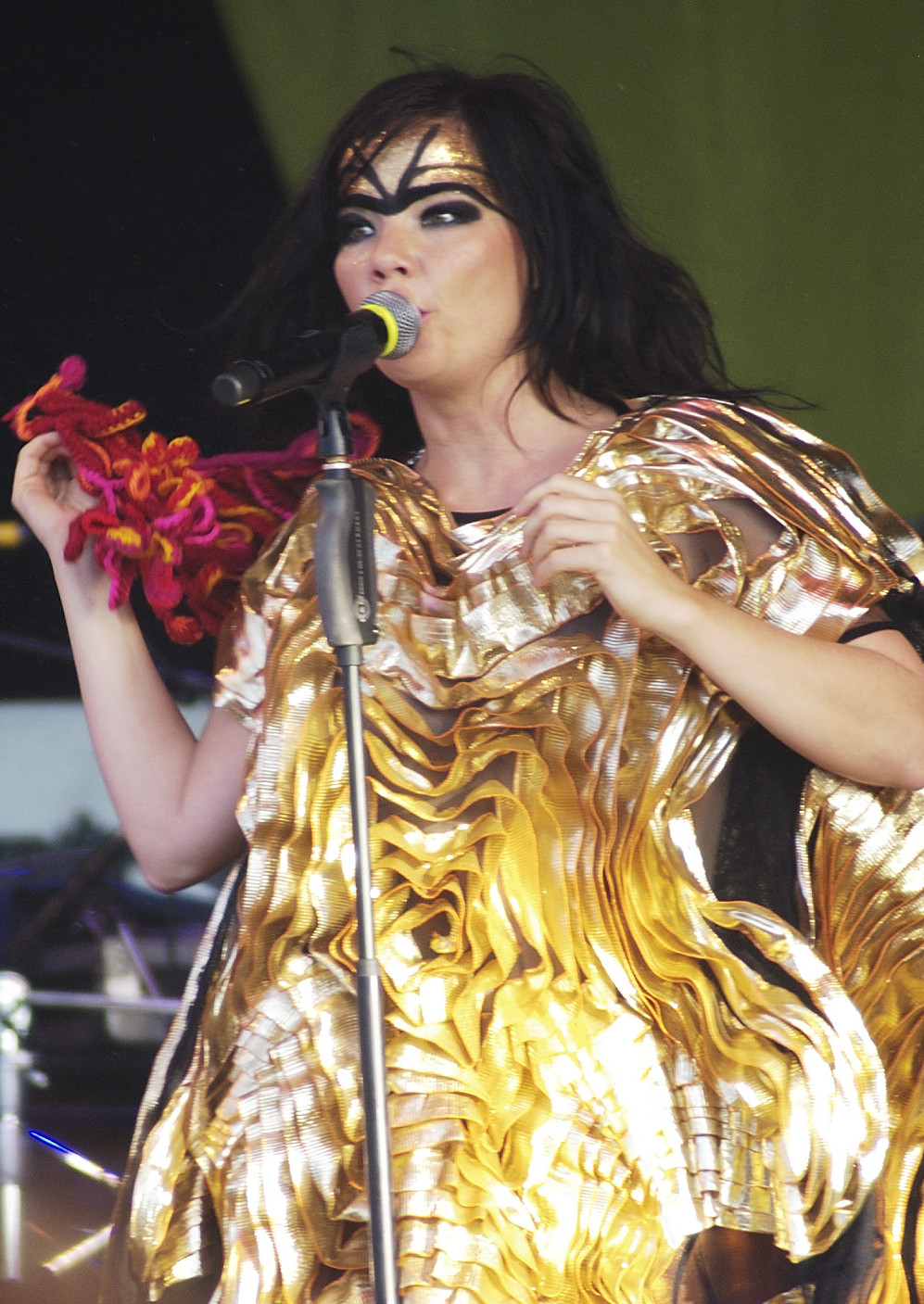
Björk performing at Big Day Out in Melbourne, Australia (2008)

A wide array of artists collaborated with Björk on material for the album. Björk first contacted Timbaland about a possible collaboration in December 2005. The first session took place in February 2006 in Studio 4 at Manhattan Center Studios in New York City, soon after Björk had visited Banda Aceh in February 2006 to view some of UNICEF's work with the children who were affected by the tsunami – in May 2005 Björk released the charity album Army of Me: Remixes and Covers to help UNICEF's work in the south east Asian region. Björk's experiences in Indonesia led to the track "Earth Intruders", originally a ten-minute song which Björk then subsequently edited for the album version. Björk collaborated on seven tracks in total with Timbaland. Timbaland had stated that he intended one of the tracks he did with Björk to appear on his new solo album but this did not materialise. The lead-off single from Volta, "Earth Intruders", is co-produced by Timbaland, as well as the second single "Innocence"; the album track "Hope" is co-written by Timbaland. Björk has stated that the other Timbaland tracks are unlikely to ever be released.

Anohni, lead singer of the band Antony and the Johnsons, appears on the album for two duets—"The Dull Flame of Desire" and "My Juvenile". The collaborative sessions took place in Jamaica. Björk has also put together her own fourteen-piece brass section of female Icelandic musicians who play on three tracks on the album. Its members comprise Sylvía Hlynsdóttir, Ása Berglind Hjálmarsdóttir, Dröfn Helgadóttir, Valdís Þorkelsdóttir, Karen J. Sturlaugsson, Björk Níelsdóttir, Sigrún Jónsdóttir, Harpa Jóhannsdóttir, Vilborg Jónsdóttir, Bergrún Snæbjörnsdóttir, Erla Axelsdóttir, Særún Pálmadóttir, Lilja Valdimarsdóttir and Brynja Guðmundsdóttir.

Other collaborators include American drummers Brian Chippendale and Chris Corsano, Malian kora player Toumani Diabaté, Congolese ensemble Konono N°1, Chinese pipa player Min Xiao-Fen, British electronic musician Mark Bell, Icelandic lyricist Sjón programmer and engineer Damian Taylor and Estonian producer Michael Pärt.

== Composition ==
Volta was labeled as an electropop, experimental, world and avant-pop album. Stylistically, it's a distinctive and eclectic album that, while incorporating the efforts of many collaborators, touches on forms of music like brass music, Chinese folk music, percussive tribal music, electro, Malian folk music, ambient and industrial music. Björk opted to incorporate plucked stringed instruments "like the ocean ... but more dirty sounding than when [she] did, for example, Vespertine", and thematically, she intended the album to be "going for something more pagan".

She used brass instrumentation for almost every song on the album, and most of the instrumentation is courtesy of an all-female Icelandic brass ensemble. However, Björk also used samples from her previous project, The Music From Drawing Restraint 9, as in the case of "Vertebræ by Vertebræ" and "Declare Independence", because she was interested to find out how the sounds from that soundtrack album would sound in a less ambient or atmospheric soundscape. For the song "Pneumonia", also featuring an independent horn section, she drew inspiration from her own bout with the disease, and an emotionally moving viewing of the film Pan's Labyrinth.

"The song "Earth Intruders," was created soon after Björk awoke from a dream she had during a cross-Atlantic flight to New York. In the dream, the singer said a "tsunami of millions and millions of poverty-stricken people" swelled high above the airplane she was a passenger on. Eventually, the wave overtook the plane, hit land and razed the White House into oblivion. "It's a quite chaotic song," she said of Volta's first single. "Lyrically, it's a collection of all of these images" burned into her memory, from her trip to Indonesia as well as her vivid, in-flight reverie."

— In an interview on MTV Björk talked about the background of "Earth Intruders".

"Earth Intruders" incorporates the efforts of multiple collaborators, including Timbaland and Danja's tribal production, Congolese ensemble Konono N°1 who play electric likembés, and experimental American percussionist Chris Corsano, as well as a continuously playing, "squelching" unified marching sound. "Declare Independence" was originally an instrumental track by British musician and frequent musical collaborator Mark Bell, performed at his live shows as early as November 2006. Björk later added her vocals and a brass arrangement on top. It features noisy and distorted industrial techno-style production, similar to "Pluto" on Björk's 1997 album Homogenic, and has been compared to Atari Teenage Riot because of its stylistic nods to punk. The lyrics are dedicated to the Faroe Islands and Greenland.

Björk has described "Wanderlust" as being the heart of Volta, and has said that the song is about "the state of looking for something and almost knowing you're never going to find it" and that it makes fun of her hunger for "something new". It was released in the UK on 30 June. As Björk said in an interview for Harp, "Things go in circles. Wanderlust, for example, is a sort of continuity of 'Hyperballad'."

== Release and album title ==
Björk has since said that "Initially after its release, I felt Volta was just OK", and that she regards the tour versions of the songs as better than those found on the album – in this sense the live recordings released on Voltaïc are to be seen as the true version of the album. The track titles were confirmed in a 14 March 2007 article on MTV, and confirmed in a post on sprk.nl on 20 March 2007. The unreleased Volta track, "Trance", appears in the short film dedicated to Alexander McQueen, "To Lee, With Love, Nick", directed by Nick Knight. The track entitled "Vertebræ by Vertebræ" was retitled from the previous, "Energy".

Björk said about the title of the album:

I am always looking for words that have some sort of energy. Usually the name just comes, from a magazine or somebody says something. I had waited for years while working on the album but it didn't come. In the lyrics there are words like "voltage" and "voodoo", which I found to be too common somehow. I have always tried to choose titles which are kind of Latin or something, which aren't english, which is a little funny because we europeans find latin to be sort of neutral language ... But I found Volta ... I don't recall how it came about, but I Googled it and found that it is both the name of a scientist in Italy who invented the battery, and also a river in Africa which had been built by men, and a lagoon built by men called Lake Volta. So several parts come into it. I'm not going to name anything specific, people can guess for themselves what it is. There is also a mediaeval dance with carries that name, a very funny dance which is very hard to learn. Thus, I got a lot of things in one word: a dance, a river in Africa which doesn't work anymore, and the battery. So okay – this fits.

The full album was accidentally made available on the UK iTunes Store at midnight on 23 April 2007 for a total of six hours, two weeks before the album's official release date. This led to the album being leaked online the following day.

=== Release formats ===
Volta was released in three editions in the UK: a digipak CD edition; a limited edition CD-DVD edition (featuring surround audio in DTS); and a double vinyl edition. The UK and Japanese editions of the album feature the Mark Bell Mix of "I See Who You Are" as a bonus track. Later editions were released in regular jewelcases. As part of the marketing campaign for the album, a series of cryptic videos were circulated on various websites, specifically via YouTube and MySpace. The videos contained distorted audio samples and snippets of the lyrics from some of the tracks on Volta. The videos were discovered on 28 March 2007, though one of the videos had been uploaded to YouTube as early as 19 March 2007. A mysterious MySpace profile link was then discovered on 28 March 2007, which featured another cryptic video and four new audio samples. The profile belonged to a fictitious "Gerome Voltaire" (a play on Alessandro Volta, the inventor of the electric battery) of the band "itshardtofindabandname" from Iceland. An article on Pitchfork on 29 March 2007 later confirmed the authenticity of the viral marketing campaign. A podcast shot by Ragnheidur Gestsdóttir detailing the album's production was made available on iTunes on 10 April 2007; six episodes were made for download, though the final installment cuts out before the video ends.

=== Voltaïc edition ===
A special edition of the album was released on 23 June 2009 as Voltaïc, and includes two live concerts filmed in Paris and Reykjavík, remixes and videos from the Volta era and a live session at Olympic Studios in London. The release was originally announced as Volta Revisited and rumoured to be released in March 2008, and some online music shops made the album available for pre-order, while the Olympic Studio session was originally announced on 4 September 2007 as the "Live Sessions Album". The Voltaïc release is available in five different editions, each featuring varying versions of the 'full' 2 CD and 2 DVD edition.

The release was subject to numerous delays, mostly due to manufacturing problems. The first mention of the release of live material from the Volta tour was made through an announcement made on Björk's official website regarding a "Live Session Album" made at the now-closed Olympic Studios. This was then followed by online stores adding to their pages a release titled "Volta Revisited" in February 2008, with projected (and incorrect) release dates of April/May 2008 listed. An email from Derek Birkett, head of One Little Indian, stated the proposed contents of the release, meant to 'tie-up' the Volta campaign. The release was originally not going to include a live DVD, but amongst those items that did not make the final release were the online blips made as part of the viral marketing campaign for Volta, the EPK interview that was used in the Volta podcasts available on the iTunes Store, and an unreleased "AOL Online session".

A Björk concert was filmed at L'Olympia in Paris, France during the last leg of the Volta tour and a small concert in Reykjavík, Iceland straight after the tour had finished. The "Volta Revisited" collection eventually surfaced as Voltaïc and was to include a live DVD among 3 other discs, although manufacturing problems lead to a delay of up to six months for its release. One manufacturing error led to 20,000 copies of the box-set having to be destroyed, and with a remanufacture necessary, Björk decided to make changes to the track listing resulting in four songs being cut from the live DVD. Towards the end of April 2009 Universal Europe accidentally shipped their copies of Voltaïc early. A statement released by One Little Indian stated that the projected release date was meant to be June 2009 as they wanted all three versions of Voltaïc to be available upon official release – the early shipment by Universal Europe was only of the Deluxe Edition. However, UK-based music retailer CD Wow was found to be for a brief period selling un-cut copies of the box set, before its official release. These copies, which had allegedly been destroyed, were manufactured in Malaysia, and as such contained more tracks than the other released (cut) editions. Voltaïc eventually enjoyed its full official release on 23 June 2009.

== Singles ==
The lead single from Volta was "Earth Intruders", released digitally on 9 April 2007, though leaked on 6 April 2007. Originally expected to be released as a physical single on 21 May 2007, the release was instead replaced by another digital release, "Earth Intruders – Club Mixes", via iTunes. Indeed, there were no chart eligible physical singles released at all during the Volta era, although box sets were eventually released of each single some months after the corresponding digital release.

The second single from Volta was originally meant to be "Declare Independence", but due to the worldwide success of Volta Björk had to perform more international promotion work than her label One Little Indian had originally planned, meaning that the previously planned video shoot for "Declare Independence" with Michel Gondry in London could not take place. The deadline for the music video contest for "Innocence" (originally announced on 19 March 2007) was then brought forward a month to 10 June 2007 so as to provide a finished video able to coincide with the July release originally planned for Declare Independence. "Innocence", the other Timbaland-co-produced track, was released digitally across the globe on 23 July 2007. It was announced that the release would be available in the US on 31 July 2007, though this date was moved later.

"Declare Independence" was released as the third single from Volta on 1 January 2008. The video, directed by Michel Gondry (his seventh video with Björk, and the first since 1997's Bachelorette), was premiered on AOL on 6 December 2007 and on Channel 4 in the UK on 13 December 2007. A making-of was made available on November 29, 2007. The video shoot took place on 11 October 2007 in New York City. Unlike the first two singles from Volta, the single has a physical release in the form of two 12-inch vinyls, a CD and a DVD.

On 7 April 2007, the "Mark Stent Extended Edit" of "Earth Intruders" was released on the Australian iTunes Store; most other iTunes Stores made the single available on April 9, the official release date of the digital single. The album version of Earth Intruders (which differs from the iTunes Store version both in terms of mixing and track length) was leaked to the Internet on 24 April 2007, due to the full album being made available accidentally on the UK iTunes Store on 23 April 2007 for a total of six hours, two weeks before the album's official release date.

A digital-only "Earth Intruders – Club Mixes" EP was released on the iTunes Store in the US and UK on 21 May 2007. The European iTunes release contained only three of the original five tracks. It is only the second time (the first being "Play Dead") that an instrumental of a Björk track has been officially released. With this release, it was determined that "Earth Intruders" would have no physical release in any territory worldwide. Also, the Mark Stent mix was initially labelled as an "Extended Edit", but on 23 May 2007, was retitled to "Radio Edit"; the "xxxChange Mix" was retitled from the previous non-descriptive title "Earth Intruders Remix".

== Promotion ==
On 21 April 2007, Björk appeared as musical guest on an episode of the US TV show Saturday Night Live in promotion of the album. She performed the songs "Earth Intruders" and "Wanderlust". On 8 June 2007, it was aired a performance by Björk on UK show Later... with Jools Holland. She performed the songs "Earth Intruders", "The Anchor Song", and "Declare Independence". On 27 September 2007, she appeared on the American late night talk show Late Night with Conan O'Brien, performing the song "Wanderlust". Björk performed three songs, at a benefit concert at Club NASA in Reykjavík on April 1 for FORMA, an Icelandic organisation which deals with people who have eating disorders. Tour rehearsals began shortly before this performance.

=== Tour ===
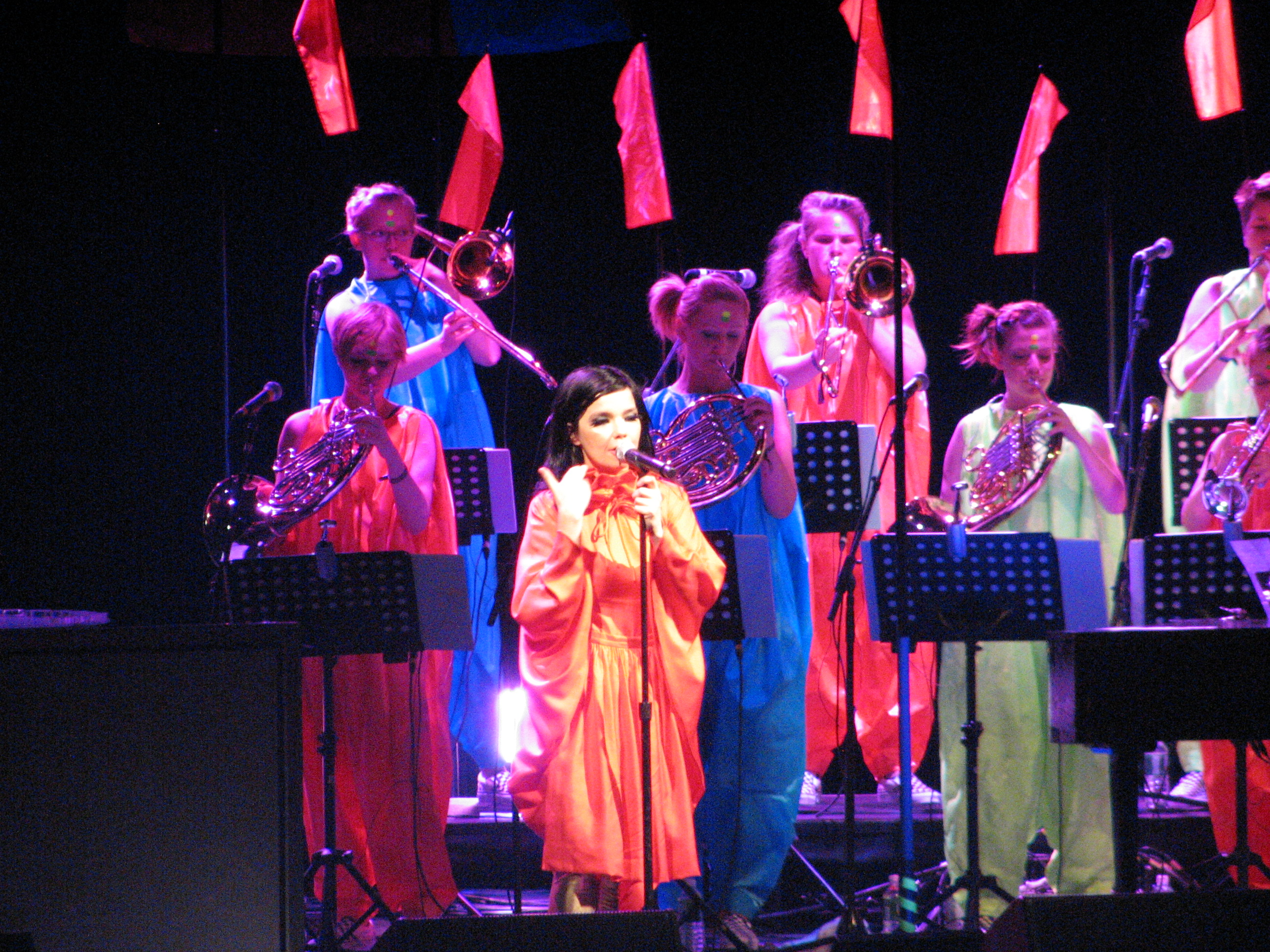
Björk performing at the Radio City Music Hall in New York City

Björk went on an 18-month tour in support of the album, which was her first tour in four years. On the tour, which was conducted on a month-on/month-off basis, Björk performed with fourteen musicians on stage. Björk's touring band for this tour consisted of drummer Chris Corsano, musician Mark Bell (who also accompanied Björk on the Homogenic tour), pianist Jónas Sen (who played celeste on the tracks Gratitude and Cetacea on the Drawing Restraint 9 soundtrack), musician Damian Taylor and a 10-piece female Icelandic brass section. Björk had described the tour as "kind of primitive, raw, almost butch", in marked contrast to her 2001 tour for Vespertine. At several of the concerts Björk had been joined on stage by some of the musicians who collaborated on the album (but who are not part of the touring band), including ANOHNI, Min Xiao-Fen and Toumani Diabaté. Björk has voiced her dislike of fans recording video or taking pictures with flash at her concerts using their mobile phones, stating that it affects her ability to perform. The tour took Björk to countries that she has not played in for over a decade, including Mexico, Brazil, Israel, Australia and New Zealand. Live footage of two concerts in Paris and Reykjavík, as well as a session with the tour band at Olympic Studios, were released as part of the Voltaïc box set on 23 June 2009.

Björk has used live performances of "Declare Independence" to declare political support for various causes, often to some controversy. At two concerts in Tokyo, Japan, she showed her support for Kosovo's declaration of independence. When her upcoming performance at the 2008 Serbian Exit Festival was cancelled, Björk suggested that "Maybe a Serb attended my concert [in Tokyo] and called home, and therefore the concert in Novi Sad was cancelled." The organiser behind the Exit Festival denied that Björk's cancellation from the festival was because of her song dedication to Kosovo; that it was actually their inability to guarantee the safety of her fans. Björk's management maintained that the cancellation was because of the dedication, claiming that they had received an email from Exit Festival saying that they would only allow the concert to go ahead if Björk's management "denied that Björk has ever [dedicated the song to Kosovo]". On 7 March 2008, Exit Festival organiser Bojan Bošković changed his position and told NME that Björk has an "open invitation" to play at the festival. Björk's dedicating of "Declare Independence" to the Faroe Islands caused some minor controversy in the country.

At a concert in Shanghai, China, on 2 March 2008, Björk shouted "Tibet, Tibet!" three times followed by "Raise your flag!" four times during the finale performance of "Declare Independence". Immediately there was an 'uneasy atmosphere' and fans left the venue quickly, and internet forums such as Tianya fielded many negative comments on her statement. China's Ministry of Culture issued a statement denouncing Björk's outburst, and warned that she would be banned from future appearances in China if she repeated such behavior. In an interview, Björk said that she did not "[plan] a trip to China with the purpose of ... propaganda" and that Chinese officials "sensationalized" her performance. On July 17, 2008, the Chinese Ministry of Culture announced that artistic groups who "threaten national unity" or "whip up ethnic hatred" among other things during live events would be banned from performing. Fans of Oasis and Bob Dylan, who had previously performed in Tibetan Freedom Concerts, blamed the new regulations for their subsequent denials of permission to perform in Chinese venues.

== Reception ==
Professional ratings
Aggregate scores
Source	Rating
Metacritic	77/100
Review scores
Source	Rating
AllMusic	4/5 stars
The A.V. Club	B+
Entertainment Weekly	B−
The Guardian	4/5 stars
Los Angeles Times	3.5/4 stars
NME	8/10
Pitchfork	5.8/10
Rolling Stone	3.5/5 stars
Slant Magazine	3.5/5 stars
Uncut	4/5 stars

Volta was well received by critics upon its release, though to a lesser extent than Björk's previous albums. According to Metacritic, the album holds a rating of 77/100, indicating favourable reviews. Heather Phares of AllMusic stated that "Volta finds the perfect balance between [Björk's] poppier work in the '90s and her experiments in the 2000s." Arwa Haider also stated that "this [Volta] is arguably [Björk's] strongest album yet", while Priya Elan praised the album as 'another amazing statement of intent-full of hope, eccenticity and wonderfulness.' Michael Keefe, in a more balanced review, said that Volta is not 'a great album, but it is quite good.' The song "Earth Intruders" got favourable reception by music critics. Drowned in Sound reviewer Mike Diver gave the song 9/10, praising it as 'immediately catchy, compellingly left of centre, and undeniably unique'. Digital Spy reviewer Miriam Zendle cited "Earth Intruders" as returning to Björk's earlier commercial sound, comparing it to her more recent albums that were "incredibly difficult to grasp hold of". Music website Popjustice called it the 80th greatest single of 2007. However, Volta also received some mixed reviews with Pitchfork stating that 'Volta is mostly proof that Björk is as fallible as the messy, unpredictable humanity she celebrates, and that even her definition of 'pop' is avant-garde.'

Volta spent nine weeks at number one on Billboard's Top Electronic Albums chart and in the first three months of release sold over half a million copies worldwide. It also managed to peak at number nine in the Billboard 200 chart, making it her highest-charting album ever in the United States, selling 43,000 copies in its first week. Volta was also released by both Polydor and Universal in selected Asian countries including Japan, South Korea, China, Hong Kong and Indonesia in which each country mentioned had a corresponding tour in 2008. In Japan, the album debuted at number 12 on the Oricon Weekly Albums Chart with 16,425 copies sold on its first week of release. The single "Earth Intruders" reached number 67 on the UK Official Download Chart, and number 78 on the main UK Singles Chart, while the remix EP later released charted on its own at number 150. In the United States, the song debuted on the US Billboard Hot 100 at number 84 in the issue dated 28 April 2007. This is Björk's highest position on the US Hot 100, the previous being "Big Time Sensuality" in 1993, which peaked at number 88. The single's success on the US charts has been mainly attributed to internet downloads; the single sold 16,000 downloads on the week of its release, propelling it to number 65 on the US Billboard Hot Digital Tracks. The song also peaked at number 75 on the US Billboard Pop 100 chart. Perhaps because of the lack of a physical release, "Innocence" failed to chart in the UK, becoming only the third single of Björk's career up until this point not to chart, the first being "Jóga" in 1997 (the EP charted at number 191 in 1998, however), and the second being "Oceania" in 2004.

== Music videos ==
The music video for "Earth Intruders" was directed by Michel Ocelot. It features Björk's face floating in the background, first upside down, then upright, singing with her eyes closed. In the foreground, a large group of silhouetted tribal warriors dance in time to the music. The video features psychedelic colours and patterns imposed on an earthy backdrop. The video ends with Björk's face slowly fading into the middle of a glade, her eyes being opened just as she sings the last lyric. Ocelot stated that Björk had originally wanted Kirikou to be featured as a 20-year-old in the video. It was accomplished within strict time constraints through a combination of live-action, silhouette animation, 3D computer graphics, traditional animation, cut-outs and other special effects. "Kirikou" was danced by Legrand Bemba-Debert in a costume made, based on Ocelot's ideas, by paper sculptor Anne-Lise Kœhler. The full video was made available in the iTunes Store on 24 April 2007. It was nominated for the 2007 Q Award for Best Video.

A fan contest to submit ideas for the music video for "Innocence" was announced, with the intention being that Björk would work with the chosen fan director to fully flesh out the video idea. The original deadline for the competition was to be on July 10; however, a decision was subsequently made to move the deadline for the contest forward by a month to June 10 in order to release the track "Innocence" around the same period that "Declare Independence" would have been originally released. The decision was met with mixed reactions by fans as many were subsequently unable to submit their ideas due to the new deadline. The shooting for the video of "Declare Independence", originally announced as the album's second single, was rescheduled to August. On 27 July 2007 it was announced that the winner of the video contest was to be decided via an online poll from a shortlist of eleven videos. On 7 August 2007, the winners, a French duo known only as Fred & Annabelle, were chosen.

The military-themed video for "Declare Independence" was directed by French director Michel Gondry. The video shoot was originally going to take place in August 2007 in London, but it was eventually rescheduled to 11 October 2007 in New York City. The finished video was premiered on AOL on 6 December 2007. It opens with Mark Bell standing on a wall suspended above Björk, playing a loom-shaped bass guitar. The strings from this guitar thread themselves through Björk's megaphone, the helmets of several foot soldiers and then up through a pulley system before returning to the guitar. As the song progresses, the strings are spraypainted with several colours as they pass through the loop. All the people in the video including Björk wear jumpsuits with the flags of Greenland and the Faroe Islands on their shoulders. The video is also available on the DVD compilation Michel Gondry 2: More Videos (Before and After DVD 1). A video was shot for the track "Wanderlust", directed by Encyclopedia Pictura and shot in New York City in stereoscopic 3D. The video involves "a mixture of large scale puppeteering, live action acrobatics, miniatures, and CG". The video was released in February 2008. Björk said in an interview that she and ANOHNI had recorded themselves singing "The Dull Flame of Desire" on a green screen, then she sent the video to three directors who had taken part in the "Innocence" video contest, and the directors made "The Dull Flame of Desire" video together via e-mail. She credited three "Innocence" competition applicants as the promotional video's directors: Cristoph Jantos, Masahiro Mogari, and Marçal Cuberta Junca.

== Track listing ==
Volta
No.	Title	Writer(s)	Producer(s)	Length
1.	"Earth Intruders"	Timothy Mosley; Nathaniel Hills; Björk	Timbaland; Björk; Danja^{[a]}	6:13
2.	"Wanderlust"	Björk; Sjón	Björk	5:51
3.	"The Dull Flame of Desire"	Björk; Fyodor Tyutchev	Björk	7:30
4.	"Innocence"	Mosley; Hills; Björk	Timbaland; Björk; Danja^{[a]}	4:27
5.	"I See Who You Are"	Björk; Mark Bell	Björk	4:22
6.	"Vertebræ by Vertebræ"	Björk	Björk; Damian Taylor	5:08
7.	"Pneumonia"	Björk	Björk	5:14
8.	"Hope"	Björk; Mosley	Björk	4:02
9.	"Declare Independence"	Björk; Bell	Björk; Bell	4:13
10.	"My Juvenile"	Björk	Björk	4:13
Total length:				51:16

Notes

- ^{^[a]} signifies a co-producer.
- "The Dull Flame of Desire" contains lyrics taken from a translation of a poem by Fyodor Tyutchev as it appears in the film Stalker by Andrei Tarkovsky (1979).
- "Innocence" contains samples from "ASYLUM", "Needle Scratch / Thump / Car" and "AM Radio 5" by Zero-G, included in Cuckooland Unhinged (1996).
- "Vertebræ by Vertebræ" and "Declare Independence" include a sample from "Hunter Vessel" by Björk, included in Drawing Restraint 9 (2005).
- Certain tracks are shortened on the US streaming version of the album:

- "Innocence" – 4:06
- "I See Who You Are" – 4:07
- "Vertebræ by Vertebræ" – 5:04
- "Hope" – 3:36

== Personnel ==
Credits adapted from Volta album liner notes.

- Björk – arrangement, bass (sine bass), brass arrangement, clavichord, editing, producer, programming, synthesizer (bass), vocals
- Timbaland – drum programming (beats) on tracks 1, 4, keyboards on tracks 1, 4, loops (triggering pre-recorded percussion loop) on track 8, producer on tracks 1, 4 and 8
- Danja – co-producer on tracks 1 and 4, drum programming (bass drums) on track 8, drum programming (beats) on tracks 1 and 4, keyboards on tracks 1 and 4
- Mark Bell – drum programming (beats, electronic beats) on tracks 1, 2, 6 and 9, keyboards on track 5, producer on track 9, programming on track 9, synthesizer on track 9
- Damian Taylor – drum programming (additional beats), drum programming (orchestral beats), editing, effects (clavichord treatments), effects (vocal processing), effects (vocal treatments), engineering, noises (morse code), producer on track 6, programming, tracking (drops)
- Michael Pärt – editing, engineering
- Chris Corsano – drums on track 1, percussion on track 5
- Brian Chippendale – drums on track 3
- Konono N°1 – kalimba (electrified likembés) on track 1
- Pete Davis – programming on tracks 1 and 4
- Jimmy Douglas – engineer (Timbaland Sessions) on tracks 1 and 4, mixing on tracks 1 and 4
- Paul 'P-Dub' Walton – engineer (Chris Corsano Sessions) on track 1
- Christophe Tonglet – engineer (assistant Konono N°1 Sessions) on track 1
- Vincent Kenis – engineer (Konono N°1 Sessions)
- Aron Arnarsson – engineer (assistant) on tracks 2, 3, 5 and 10
- Anohni (Note: Anohni is credited as Antony in the liner notes.) – vocals on track 3, vocals (starring as "the Conscience") on track 10
- Jónas Sen – clavichord on track 10
- Mark Robertson – transcription by (midi transcription and part preparation for brass) on tracks 2, 3, 5 and 7
- Hector Castillo – engineer on tracks 3 and 5
- Ishiho Nishiki – engineer (assistant) on tracks 3 and 5
- Min Xiao-Fen – pipa on track 5
- Nico Muhly – adaptation (brass arrangement) on track 7, conductor on track 7
- Christian Rutledge – contractor on track 7
- Jason Agel – engineer (assistant) on track 7
- Andy Manganello – engineer (staff engineer) on track 7
- Neil Dorfsman – engineering and mixing on track 7
- Toumani Diabaté – kora on track 8
- Yves Werner – engineer (Toumani Diabaté sessions) on track 8
- Mark "Spike" Stent – mixing on tracks 2, 3, 5 to 10
- Ted Jensen – mastering
- Dave Paterson – technician (sound Fx design)
- Alex Dromgoole – engineer (assistant)
- Daniel Morrison – engineer (assistant)
- David Emery – engineer (assistant)
- Jonathan Tams – engineer (assistant)
- Nellee Hooper – music consultant (paternal musical advice)
- M/M Paris – art direction, design
- Bernhard Willhelm – design (sculpture)
- The Icelandic Love Corporation – crochet costume
- Inez van Lamsweerde and Vinoodh Matadin – photography (inside images)
- Nick Knight – photography (sculpture)

Brass sections

- Bergrún Snæbjörnsdóttir
- Björk Níelsdóttir
- Brynja Guðmundsdóttir
- Dröfn Helgadóttir
- Erla Axelsdóttir
- Harpa Jóhannsdóttir
- Karen J. Sturlausson
- Lilja Valdimarsdóttir
- Sigrún Jónsdóttir
- Sylvia Hlynsdóttir
- Særún Pálmadóttir
- Valdis Þorkelsdóttir
- Vilborg Jónsdóttir
- Ása Berglind Hjálmarsdóttir
- Einar Jónsson
- Eiríkur Örn Pálsson
- Emil Friðfinnson
- Joseph Ognibene
- Oddur Björnsson
- Roine Hultgren
- Sigurður Þorbergsson
- Ásgeir H. Steingrímsson

Horns

- Amber Chisholm-Lane
- Chas Yarborough
- Christopher Costanzi
- Robert Jost
- Sharon Moe
- Susan Panny
- Theo Primis

== Charts ==
=== Weekly charts ===
2007 weekly chart performance for Volta
Chart (2007)	Peak position
Australian Albums (ARIA)	20
Austrian Albums (Ö3 Austria)	5
Belgian Albums (Ultratop Flanders)	9
Belgian Albums (Ultratop Wallonia)	14
Canadian Albums (Billboard)	6
Czech Albums (ČNS IFPI)	16
Danish Albums (Hitlisten)	1
Dutch Albums (Album Top 100)	17
European Albums (Billboard)	4
Finnish Albums (Suomen virallinen lista)	7
French Albums (SNEP)	3
German Albums (Offizielle Top 100)	9
Greek Albums (IFPI)	4
Icelandic Albums (Tónlistinn)	1
Irish Albums (IRMA)	10
Italian Albums (FIMI)	12
Japanese Albums (Oricon)	12
Mexican Albums (Top 100 Mexico)	6
New Zealand Albums (RMNZ)	32
Norwegian Albums (VG-lista)	1
Polish Albums (ZPAV)	6
Portuguese Albums (AFP)	9
Scottish Albums (Official Charts)	8
Spanish Albums (Promusicae)	5
Swedish Albums (Sverigetopplistan)	11
Swiss Albums (Schweizer Hitparade)	3
UK Albums (Official Charts)	7
UK Independent Albums (Official Charts)	2
US Billboard 200	9
US Top Dance Albums (Billboard)	1
US Top Rock Albums (Billboard)	2
US Indie Store Album Sales (Billboard)	1

2016 weekly chart performance for Volta
Chart (2016)	Peak position
Mexican Albums (Top 100 Mexico)	20

=== Year-end charts ===
Year-end chart performance for Volta
Chart (2007)	Position
French Albums (SNEP)	88
US Top Dance/Electronic Albums (Billboard)	3

== Certifications and sales ==
Certifications and sales for Volta
Region	Certification	Certified units/sales
France	—	20,000
Iceland	—	3,500
Japan	—	27,000
Russia (NFPF)	Gold	10,000^{*}
United Kingdom (BPI)	Silver	60,606
United States	—	132,000
^{*} Sales figures based on certification alone.

== Release history ==
Release information are obtained as follows:

Release history for Volta
Region	Date	Label
Mexico	1 May 2007	Universal
Japan	2 May 2007	Polydor; Universal Music Japan
United Kingdom	7 May 2007	One Little Indian
United States	8 May 2007	Elektra; Atlantic
Canada	8 May 2007	Elektra; Atlantic
Hong Kong	8 May 2007	Universal
Israel	10 May 2007	Universal
Taiwan	15 May 2007	Polydor; Universal
South Korea	16 May 2007	Polydor; Universal
