= Særún =

Icelandic given name

Særún is an Icelandic feminine given name.

== People ==
- Særún Norén, a photographer
- Særún Pálmadóttir, a musician on Volta (album)
- Særún Jónsdóttir, a physiotherapist
- Særún Birta Eiríksdóttir, a volleyball player

== Other ==
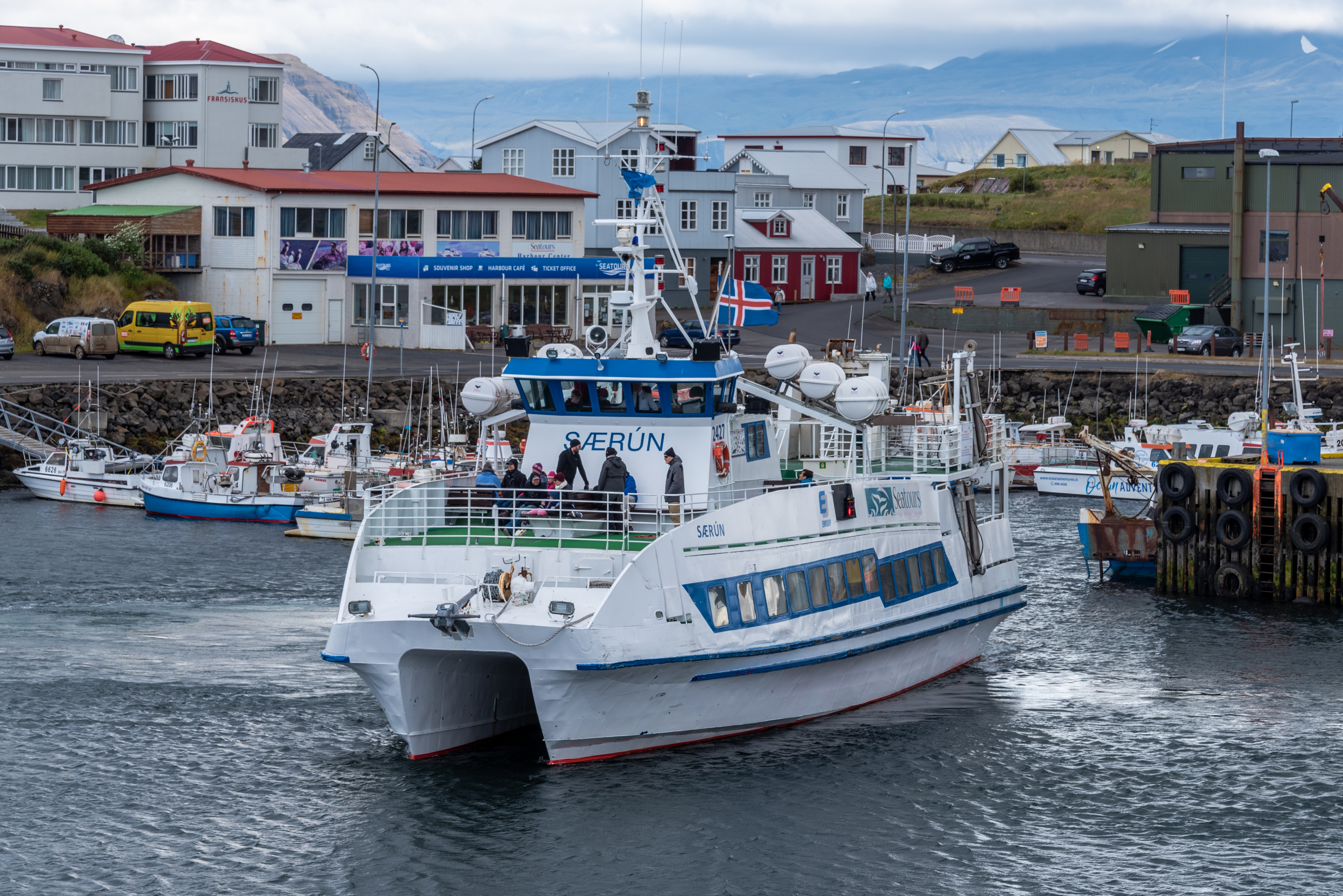
Særún, a ferry

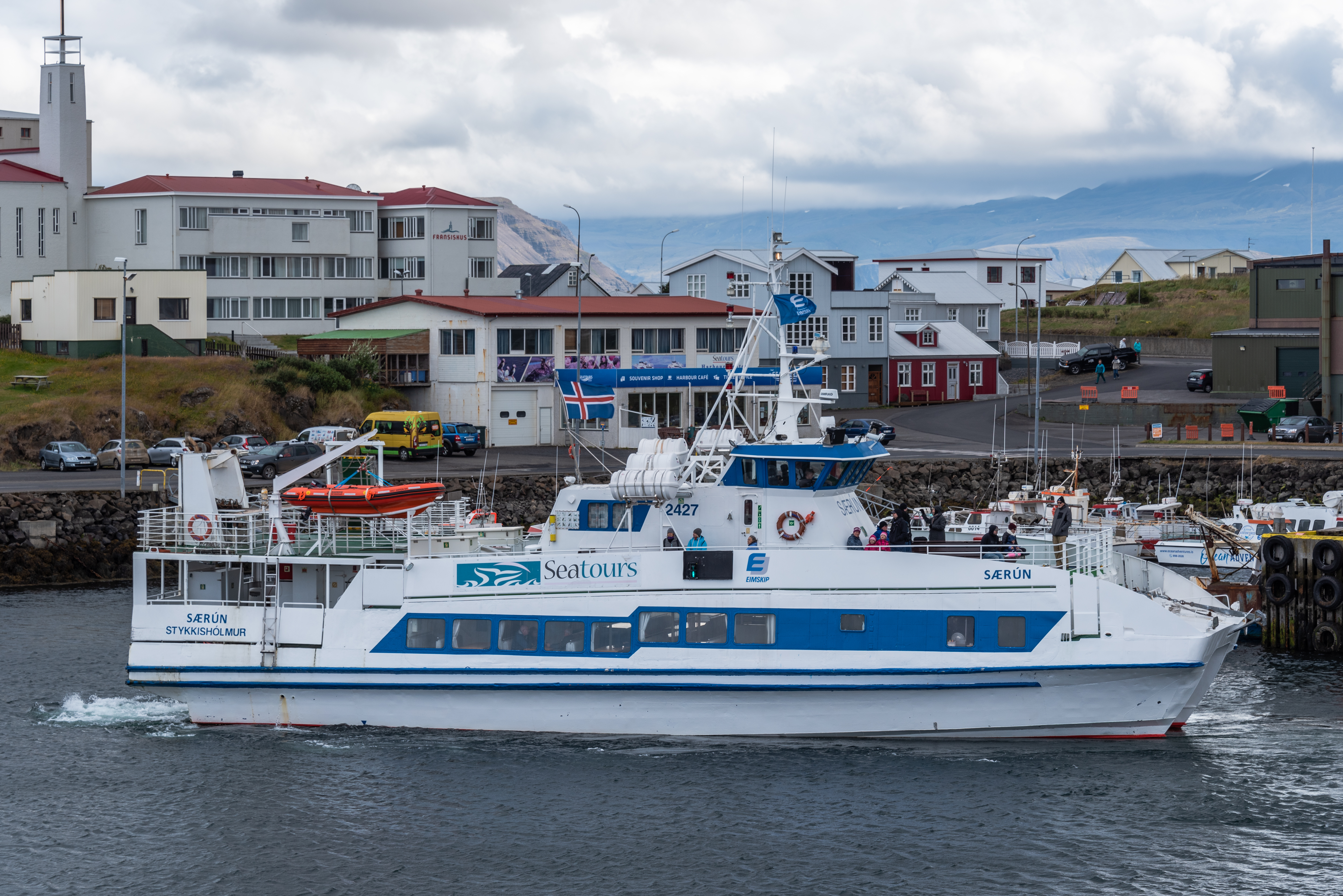
Side view of Særún

- Særún, an Eimskip passenger ferry
