= Wanderlust (Björk song) =

Single by Björk

from the album Volta
- Released: 7 April 2008
- Length: 5:51 (album version); 7:40 (video version)
- Label: One Little Indian
- Songwriters: Björk; Sjón
- Producer: Björk

Björk singles chronology
"Declare Independence" (2008)	"Wanderlust" (2008)	"The Dull Flame of Desire" (2008)

Isobel song cycle singles chronology
"Oceania" (2004)	"Wanderlust" (2008)

Music video
- "Wanderlust" on YouTube

"Wanderlust" is a song written and recorded by Icelandic singer Björk. The track was released digitally as the fourth single from her sixth full-length studio album, Volta, on 7 April 2008.

White labels of the single were issued in February 2008. The physical single was released on 12 June after an almost two-month delay.

Björk has described "Wanderlust" as being the heart of Volta, and has said that the song is about "the state of looking for something and almost knowing you're never going to find it" and that it makes fun of her hunger for "something new". It was released in the UK on 30 June.

As Björk said in an interview for Harp, "Things go in circles. Wanderlust, for example, is a sort of continuity of 'Hyperballad'."

== Promotion ==
Björk performed the song during every show of her Volta tour. She also performed the song on Saturday Night Live on 21 April 2007 and on Late Night with Conan O'Brien on 27 September 2007. The 3D version of the music video was premiered as part of the 19 April Record Store Day in the United States, an event celebrating the independent record store culture. Over 10,000 pairs of 3D glasses were distributed for home viewing as well as selected in-store video kiosk locations.

== Music video ==
Björk in the music video.

The music video, directed by Isaiah Saxon and Sean Hellfritsch of Encyclopedia Pictura in New York City in stereoscopic 3D, involves a mixture of large scale puppeteering, live-action acrobatics, miniatures, and CG. The video took nine months to complete and required the creation of a custom-built 3D camera system. It was choreographed by Chris Elam, artistic director of Misnomer Dance, and features Brynne Billingsley and Coco Karol. The video features an unusual style of pillarboxing where the inside edges are concave. It officially premiered on Yahoo Music on 31 March. In the video, a group of yaks crowd beside a river bank. Björk, in an ancient Mongolian tribal costume, appears amongst them and creates a river from the ground. She rises up and leads the herd into the river, and they all float downstream, with Björk on the back of one of the yak-like creatures. Throughout the video, a clay personal demon, dubbed the "painbody" by the directors, comes out of her backpack and tries to attack her. Finally, a god creates a waterfall and Björk falls off the edge and into the water below, where a pair of hands catches her after a vortex of water has engulfed her and the painbody.

The opening section of the video features the prelude of foghorns that precede "Wanderlust" on the album (it's included on the "Earth Intruders" track, right when the song ends). The video itself was awarded as Best Art Direction, Best Alternative/Indie Video and Video Of The Year at the 2008 UK Music Video Awards, and was also nominated for Best Special Effects. The video also received Video of the Year nods from the DA&D Awards and SPIN Magazine.

== Track listing ==
The limited edition "multiformat" box set consists of a sticker-sealed fold out box with five colored nesting boxes containing two 12" vinyl singles, a CD and a DVD in colored paper sleeves, a set of 3D glasses and stickers from the music video.

=== 12" double heavy weight vinyl ===
1. "Wanderlust" (Matthew Herbert Remix)
2. "Wanderlust" (Mark Stent Mix)
3. "Wanderlust" (Ratatat Remix)
4. "Wanderlust" (Mark Stent Instrumental)

=== CD ===
1. "Wanderlust" (Matthew Herbert Remix)
2. "Wanderlust" (Mark Stent Mix)
3. "Wanderlust" (Ratatat Remix)
4. "Wanderlust" (Mark Stent Instrumental)

=== DVD ===
1. "Wanderlust" (3D Music video)
2. "Wanderlust" (2D Music video)
3. "Making Of"

=== Digital iTunes EP ===
1. "Wanderlust" (Mark Stent Mix)
2. "Wanderlust" (Matthew Herbert Remix)
3. "Wanderlust" (Ratatat Remix)
4. "Wanderlust" (Mark Stent Instrumental)
5. "Wanderlust" (music video)

In some territories, the music video is replaced with the radio edit of "Wanderlust".

== Charts ==
Chart performance for "Wanderlust"
Chart (2008)	Peak position
France (SNEP)	67
Italy (Musica e dischi)	19
