= Elan Media Partners =

Élan Media Partners
- Formerly: Stomp Entertainment
- Company type: Private
- Industry: E-commerce; Online retail
- Predecessor: Stomp Entertainment
- Founded: 2010
- Defunct: Before 2021
- Fate: Dissolved
- Headquarters: Sydney, New South Wales, Australia
- Area served: Australia
- Key people: Craig White; General Manager
- Products: Home entertainment products
- Services: Online retail and fulfilment services
- Owner: Surrealus
- Website: elanmediapartners.com

Élan Media Partners was an Australian e-commerce company. It was established in 2010 after Surrealus, a company run by Paul Uniacke and Edward Nedelko, who at the time owned and operated Video Ezy, Blockbuster Australia and EzyDVD under their Franchise Entertainment Group, acquired Stomp Entertainment. Following a transitional period, Stomp changed its name to Élan Media Partners. Craig White, former Director of Sales at 20th Century Fox Home Entertainment, was appointed General Manager. White also co-founded an affiliated company, Access Digital Entertainment, which focused on internet video streaming.

== Overview ==
Élan Media Partners provided online and fulfilment services to various entertainment retailers, libraries and schools. The company owned and operated online consumer retail sites such as chaos.com, play4me.com and wowhd.com. Elan Media Partners also managed and operated the Video Ezy, Blockbuster Australia and EzyDVD websites. Based in Sydney, New South Wales, Élan Media Partners also had warehousing operations in Melbourne and Hong Kong.

The company dissolved prior to 2021.
