= Declare Independence =

Single by Björk

from the album Volta
- Released: 1 January 2008
- Genre: Industrial; electroclash; electropunk
- Length: 4:13
- Label: One Little Indian
- Songwriters: Björk; Mark Bell
- Producers: Björk; Mark Bell

Björk singles chronology
"Innocence" (2007)	"Declare Independence" (2008)	"Wanderlust" (2008)

Music video
- "Declare Independence" on YouTube

"Declare Independence" is a song written and recorded by Icelandic singer Björk. It was released on 1 January 2008 through One Little Indian as the third single from her sixth studio album, Volta. Björk's dedication of the song to various independence causes at live performances in Shanghai and Tokyo have caused significant controversy.

== Background ==
"Declare Independence" was originally an instrumental track by British musician and frequent musical collaborator Mark Bell, performed at his live shows as early as November 2006. Björk later added her vocals and brass arrangement on top. The lyrics are dedicated to the Faroe Islands and Greenland, islands which currently are constituent nations within the Kingdom of Denmark, as Björk's home country of Iceland had been.

"Declare Independence" was originally meant to be released as the second single from Volta in August 2007, but the previously-planned video shoot for "Declare Independence" with Michel Gondry in London was postponed due to Björk's busier than expected promotional schedule. The deadline for the music video contest for "Innocence", then slated as the third single, was then brought forward a month to 10 June 2007 so as to provide a finished video able to coincide with a July 2007 release originally planned for "Declare Independence". The limited edition "multiformat" box set consists of a sticker-sealed fold-out box with five colored nesting boxes containing two 12" vinyl singles, a CD and a music video DVD in colored paper sleeves. A digital release accompanied the physical release on the same date.

== Music video ==
=== Background and development ===
The military-themed performance video was directed by French director Michel Gondry. It is his seventh video with Björk, and the first since 1997's "Bachelorette". In a press conference on 22 March 2007, Gondry stated that he would be shooting a video with Björk for an upcoming single, and though he did not specifically state which song it would be for, described his treatment as being for a "punk" song. Later confirmation of the video being for "Declare Independence" was made in an article on Monsters and Critics on 8 May 2007. The video shoot was originally going to take place in August 2007 in London (as was the projected single release) but it was eventually rescheduled to 11 October 2007 in New York City. The finished video was premiered on AOL on 6 December 2007. A making-of was made available on 29 November 2007. The video was premiered exclusively on Channel 4 in the UK on 13 December 2007. The video is also available on the DVD compilation Michel Gondry 2: More Videos (Before and After DVD 1).

=== Synopsis ===
During this scene, Björk holds a megaphone, while Mark Bell stands on a wall suspended above her with foot soldiers in front of the megaphone.

The video opens with Mark Bell standing on a wall suspended above Björk, playing a loom-shaped bass guitar. The strings from this guitar thread themselves through Björk's megaphone, the helmets of several foot soldiers and then up through a pulley system before returning to the guitar. As the song progresses, the strings are spraypainted with several colours as they pass through the loop. When the beat begins, the foot soldiers jump along to the beat, triggering a platform switch that raises a large white banner that loops around the installation. The banner is then painted by five other people in jumpsuits when it reaches the top. A trickle of green paint streaks down the camera's lens at the end of the video as the machine begins to grind to a halt. All the people in the video including Björk wear jumpsuits with the flags of Greenland and the Faroe Islands on their shoulders.

== Dedications and controversies ==
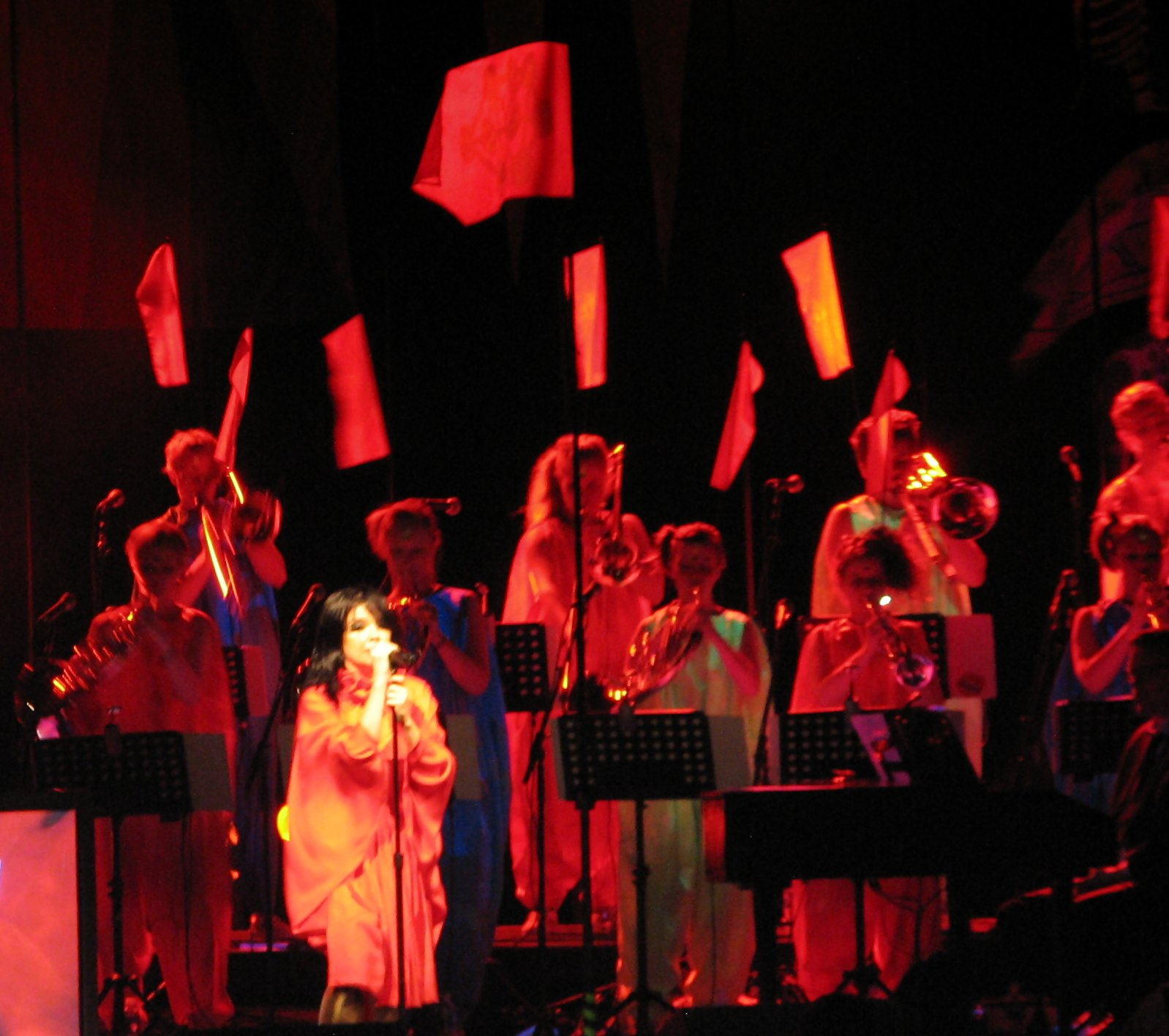
Björk performing at the Radio City Music Hall in New York City.

Björk has used live performances of "Declare Independence" to declare political support for various causes, often to some controversy. At two concerts in Tokyo, she showed her support for Kosovo's declaration of independence from Serbia. When her upcoming performance at the 2008 Serbian Exit Festival was cancelled, Björk suggested that "Maybe a Serb attended my concert [in Tokyo] and called home, and therefore the concert in Novi Sad was cancelled." The organizer behind the Exit Festival denied that Björk's cancellation from the festival was because of her song dedication to Kosovo; that it was actually their inability to guarantee the safety of her fans. Björk's management maintained that the cancellation was because of the dedication, claiming that they had received an email from Exit Festival saying that they would only allow the concert to go ahead if Björk's management "denied that Björk has ever [dedicated the song to Kosovo]". On 7 March 2008, Exit Festival organiser Bojan Bošković changed his position and told NME that Björk has an "open invitation" to play at the festival. Björk's dedicating of "Declare Independence" to the Faroe Islands caused some minor controversy in the country.

At a concert in Shanghai on 2 March 2008, Björk shouted "Tibet, Tibet!" three times followed by "Raise your flag!" four times during the finale performance of "Declare Independence". Immediately there was an "uneasy atmosphere" and fans left the venue quickly, and internet forums such as Tianya fielded many negative comments on her statement. Chinese Ministry of Culture issued a statement denouncing Björk's outburst, and warned that she would be banned from future appearances in China if she repeated such behavior. In an interview, Björk said that she did not "[plan] a trip to China with the purpose of... propaganda" and that Chinese officials "sensationalized" her performance. On 17 July 2008, the Chinese Ministry of Culture announced that artistic groups who "threaten national unity" or "whip up ethnic hatred" among other things during live events would be banned from performing. Fans of Oasis and Bob Dylan, who had previously performed in Tibetan Freedom Concerts, blamed the new regulations for their subsequent denials of permission to perform in Chinese venues.

In September 2014, Björk dedicated the song to Scotland the day before the independence referendum took place. In October 2017, after the referendum for independence that took place in Catalonia, Björk dedicated the song to the Catalans on Twitter. In August 2019, following Donald Trump's expression of interest to buy Greenland from Denmark, Björk once again took to Twitter to support the island nation's independence.

On 5 January 2026, shortly after the United States strikes on Venezuela and after Donald Trump once again stated his desire to annex Greenland to the United States, Björk shared her support for Greenland's independence through an Instagram post where the song played on loop.

== Live performances ==
On 8 June 2007 (recorded on 5 June 2007), Björk performed, along with her tour musicians, on the UK television show Later... with Jools Holland for the fifth time in her solo career. She performed "Earth Intruders", "The Anchor Song", and "Declare Independence". Björk's set at Glastonbury Festival was broadcast on BBC Four (and later on BBC Two) on 22 June 2007, with "Declare Independence" being the last song of the concert.

Björk performed the song on every show of the worldwide Volta tour, usually as the very last song of the concert. The live performances make heavy use of the ReacTable, an electro-acoustic music instrument with a tabletop Tangible User Interface. Musician Damian Taylor plays the ReacTable live on stage, and is often joined on the instrument by the support bands when "Declare Independence" is played. During the Australian leg of her tour, as part of the 2008 Big Day Out, the song was dedicated to the Aboriginal people of Australia.

In the Biophilia tour, the song was played using the instrumental base of the song (eliminating brass and beats, being the latter played live onstage by Manu Delago) and featuring the Tesla coil as a new instrument. On 12 August 2012 in Helsinki, Finland, Björk dedicated the song to Pussy Riot.

Björk also performed the song at the end of her set in Toronto on 16 July 2013, and dedicated it to Trayvon Martin.

== Track listings and formats ==
12" vinyl 1

Side A. "Declare Independence" (Ghostigital 12" mix)
Side B. "Declare Independence" (Mark Stent mix)

12" vinyl 2

Side C. "Declare Independence" (Matthew Herbert 12" mix)
Side D. "Declare Independence" (Mark Stent instrumental)

CD

1. "Declare Independence" (Mark Stent mix)
2. "Declare Independence" (Ghostigital In Deep End dance 12" remix)
3. "Declare Independence" (Matthew Herbert 12" mix)
4. "Declare Independence" (Mark Stent instrumental)

DVD

1. "Declare Independence" — Music video

Digital EP

1. "Declare Independence" (Mark Stent mix)
2. "Declare Independence" (Ghostigital in Deep End dance remix 12")
3. "Declare Independence" (Matthew Herbert 12")
4. "Declare Independence" (Mark Stent instrumental)
- the iTunes release of the EP also included the music video.

== Charts ==
Chart performance for "Declare Independence"
Chart (2007)	Peak position
France (SNEP)	68
Italy (Musica e Dischi)	19

== Versions ==
- Album version – 4:12
- Voltaïc version – 4:18
- Mark Stent Mix – 4:12
- Mark Stent Instrumental – 4:12
- Matthew Herbert 12" Mix – 5:21
- Ghostigital in Deep End Dance 12" Remix – 2:49
- Black Pus Mix – 8:48 (Available on Voltaïc)
