= The Dull Flame of Desire =

Single by Björk featuring Anohni

from the album Volta
- B-side: "Innocence" (Sinden Remix)
- Released: 29 September 2008
- Studio: Geejam Studios (Jamaica)
- Length: 7:30 (album version); 4:05 (video/radio edit)
- Label: One Little Indian
- Songwriters: Fyodor Tyutchev; Björk
- Producer: Björk

Björk featuring Anohni singles chronology
"Wanderlust" (2008)	"The Dull Flame of Desire" (2008)	"Náttúra" (2008)

"The Dull Flame of Desire" is a song recorded by Icelandic singer Björk featuring Anohni from the band Anohni and the Johnsons. It was released as the fifth and final single from her sixth full-length studio album, Volta, on 29 September 2008. She sang it twelve times on her global Volta tour, often with Anohni.

== Background ==
The entirety of the lyrics to The Dull Flame of Desire are an English translation of a Russian poem by Fyodor Tyutchev, from its original appearance in the Andrei Tarkovsky film Stalker (1980).

== Music video ==
Music video stills

Björk and Anohni's faces in the first part of the music video.

Björk and Anohni hug in the second part of the video.

Björk and Anohni's faces morphed into one in the third part of the video.

It was first reported on the official site of Anohni and the Johnsons that Anohni and Björk had shot a video for "Dull Flame of Desire". The news was subsequently removed from the site. A few months later Björk revealed in an interview that she and Anohni had recorded themselves singing the song against a green screen in New York, and that she had sent the raw footage to three directors who had taken part in the video contest for her previous single "Innocence".

When we did the competition for "Innocence", where all the fans sent in videos, they sent in like 400 videos. There were some that I thought were amazing, made by really talented visual people who had maybe never done this before, but they didn't totally fit with the mood of "Innocence". So I contacted them and asked them if they would work together and do ["Dull Flame of Desire"]. In that song, we repeat the same verse over and over again. So I thought it would be interesting to have one verse presented by one director, and then the second by another director, and then the third by another. I had never done that before, and it was quite exciting. We recorded our part in front of a green screen, and sent it by email to the directors, one in Japan, one in Spain, and one in Germany. They're collaborating via email. I don't know how long it will take. I was being pressured by my record company [to make videos] for the more up-tempo songs, but I have great love for "Dull Flame of Desire", and it was very emotionally special for me to make that with Antony. I thought this would be a good way of doing it.

It was later announced that Christoph Jantos (Berlin), Masahiro Mogari (Tokyo), and Marçal Cuberta Juncà (Girona) were the chosen directors. Each director was given their own section of the film to develop how they wished - on completion the three films were edited together in London to make the final music video.

The video has three segments. In the first part (directed by Masahiro Mogari), a lot of little white dots are moving until they form Björk and Anohni's faces. The second part (directed by Marçal Cuberta) features the footage of Björk and Anohni with a threshold effect. In the third part (directed by Christoph Jantos, animated by Marta Bala), their faces are seen moving until both faces morph into one.

A different edit of the video was done for one of Modeselektor's remixes of the song and shown on MTV.

== Track listing ==
The limited edition "multiformat" box set consists of a sticker-sealed fold out box with five colored nesting boxes containing two 12" vinyl singles, a CD and a DVD in colored paper sleeves. The release includes two new remixes by Modeselektor of "The Dull Flame of Desire" and a new remix of Björk's previous single "Innocence" by Sinden. The Mark Stent mixes refer to the album version and its instrumental.

=== Twelve-inch double heavyweight vinyl ===
1. "Dull Flame of Desire" (Modeselektor’s Rmx for Girls)
2. "Dull Flame of Desire" (Modeselektor’s Rmx for Boys)
3. "Innocence" (Sinden Remix)
4. "Dull Flame of Desire" (Mark Stent Album Mix)

=== CD ===
1. "Dull Flame of Desire" (Modeselektor’s Rmx For Girls)
2. "Dull Flame of Desire" (Modeselektor’s Rmx For Boys)
3. "Dull Flame of Desire" (Mark Stent Album Mix)
4. "Dull Flame of Desire" (Video / Radio Edit)
5. "Dull Flame of Desire" (Mark Stent Instrumental)
6. "Innocence" (Sinden Remix)

=== DVD ===
1. "Dull Flame of Desire" (Music video)

== Charts ==
Chart performance for "The Dull Flame of Desire"
Chart (2008)	Peak position
France (SNEP)	72
Italy (Musica e dischi)	35
US Hot Singles Sales (Billboard)	3
US Hot Dance Singles Sales (Billboard)	1
