= Michel Gondry 2: More Videos (Before and After DVD 1) =

Video by Various
- Released: April 2009
- Labels: Sleeping Train Productions & Partizan Films, LLC

Various chronology
| Directors Label | Michel Gondry 2: More Videos (Before and After DVD 1) |

Michel Gondry 2: More Videos (Before and After DVD 1) is a DVD compilation of music videos and short films by director Michel Gondry. It was released in April 2009 and includes videos which were not included on Gondry's Directors Label DVD. The compilation includes nearly three hours of videos and never-before-seen behind-the-scenes content

== Music videos ==
- Michael Andrews Ft. Gary Jules "Mad World"
- Paul McCartney "Dance Tonight"
- Thomas Dolby "Close But No Cigar"
- Björk "Declare Independence"
- Steriogram "Walkie Talkie Man"
- The Willowz "I Wonder"
- Beck "Cellphone's Dead"
- The White Stripes "The Denial Twist"
- Donald Fagen "Snowbound"
- Cody ChesnuTT "King of the Game"
- Sinéad O'Connor "Fire on Babylon"
- Queen with Wyclef Jean Ft. Pras & Free "Another One Bites the Dust"
- Radiohead "Knives Out"
- Dick Annegarn "Soleil Du Soir"
- Sananda Maitreya "She Kissed Me"
- Sheryl Crow "A Change Would Do You Good"
- The Black Crowes "High Head Blues"
- Leafbirds "It Can All Be Taken Away"
- The Rolling Stones "Gimme Shelter"
- Energy Orchard "How the West Was Won"

== Behind the scenes footage and other works ==
- The Simpsons parody of the White Stripes video
- Booker T and The Michel Gondrys
- Michel Gondry Solves a Rubik's Cube with His Feet
- Michel Gondry Solves a Rubik's Cube with His Nose
- Jack Black Beats Michel Gondry with His Rubik's Cubes
- Herve Di Rosa "Viva Di Rosa"
- Conan and the Big Head
- Paul Gondry's The Willowz "Take a Look Around"
- How to Blow Up a Helicopter (Ayako's Story)
- Forum Des Images "L'Histoire De l'Univers"
