= Wild in the Country (festival) =

English music festival

- Location: Staffordshire
- Years active: 2004–2007
- Founders: Renaissance

Wild in the Country was a music festival organized by record label Renaissance and held from 2004 to 2007.

The first Wild in the Country event was held at Shugborough Hall in Staffordshire, England on 1 May 2004. Acts who appeared at the first event were Scissor Sisters, Sasha & John Digweed, Dave Seaman, James Zabiela, Derrick Carter, Yousef, Infusion, Neneh Cherry, Jon Carter, and Audio Bullies.

Gigwise.com describes Wild in the Country as "the ideal festival for lovers of electronic music." and notes that the festival is part of a Renaissance tradition of holding gigs in picturesque settings like Allerton Castle and Shugborough Hall. The last festival was at Knebworth Park starting on 30 June 2007 with Underworld, Hot Chip, and Sasha and Digweed.

The 2008 festival scheduled to be held at Knebworth Park, Hertfordshire on 5 July was canceled two days prior to the event "due to lower than expected ticket sales and a key investor withdrawing at the last minute, leaving the event in an unsustainable position." The decision came a week after headliner Björk canceled her appearance having failed to come to terms with the organizers over staging logistics.

== 2007 line up ==
- Underworld
- Hot Chip
- Sasha
- John Digweed
- 2ManyDJ's
- Tiga
- Eric Prydz
- Ricardo Villalobos
- François K
- Erol Alkan
- Tiefschwarz
- Simian Mobile Disco
- Justice
- Mathew Jonson
- Luciano
- Damian Lazarus
- Filthy Dukes
- Robin Porter
- Dave Martin
- Geddes - Mulletover

== 2008 ==
The scheduled line-up for the 2008 edition which was cancelled two days before it was due to begin was:

- Björk
- Battles
- Soulwax
- Foals
- Pendulum
- Booka Shade
- Hercules & Love Affair
- The Presets
- Kissy Sell Out
- The Cuban Brothers
- Dan le sac vs Scroobius Pip
- Metronomy
- Killa Kela
- Audion
- Hearthrob
- The Field
- XX Teens
- Slagsmålsklubben

== See also ==
- List of electronic music festivals
- Live electronic music
