= Jónas Sen =

Icelandic pianist, composer and music critic (born 1962)

- Born: 1962 (age 63–64); Iceland
- Occupations: Pianist, composer, arranger, music critic, television presenter
- Instruments: Piano, keyboards
- Website: jonas-sen.com

Jónas Sen (born 1962) is an Icelandic pianist, composer and arranger, and a music critic for Vísir.is. He has collaborated with the musician Björk, including work on the sheet music publication 34 Scores for Piano, Organ, Harpsichord and Celeste.

Sen has presented and written music-related television programmes for RÚV.

== Music career ==
=== Collaborations with Björk ===
Sen performed as a keyboard player with Björk during the Volta touring period (2007–2008). In connection with Björk’s Biophilia project, he arranged material for keyboard instruments used in the app release.

In 2017, Sen collaborated with Björk on the publication 34 Scores for Piano, Organ, Harpsichord and Celeste.

=== Composition and theatre ===
Sen composed music for Versations / Tetralogia, part of Gabríela Friðriksdóttir’s work related to Iceland’s participation at the 2005 Venice Biennale.

He also composed music for the multimedia theatre/opera production H, an incident, directed by Kris Verdonck.

== Media career ==
=== Television ===
Sen has written and hosted music-related programmes for RÚV, including Tíu fingur. He has also been credited as presenter (“Umsjón”) for the series Tónspor. Morgunblaðið reported in 2010 on the programme Átta raddir in connection with RÚV programming.

=== Music criticism ===
Sen has written music criticism for Vísir.is. He has also been identified in the Icelandic press as a music critic for Fréttablaðið.

In 2025, Sen’s concert reviews were discussed in Icelandic media coverage about music criticism and tone in reviews.

== Bibliography ==
- 2017: Þá er ástæða til að hlæja: Æviminningar Halldórs Haraldssonar (JPV).

== Discography ==
=== Solo and collaborations ===
- 1993 – Works by Brahms, Liszt and Scriabin (piano).
- 2005 – Versations Tetralogia (with Gabríela Friðriksdóttir, Björk, Borgar Magnason and Daníel Ágúst Haraldsson).
- 2011 – Langt fyrir utan ystu skóga – arrangements of songs by Björk (with Ásgerður Júníusdóttir).

=== As featured musician ===
- 2005 – Björk, Drawing Restraint 9 (celeste).
- 2007 – Björk, Volta (keyboards; acoustic arrangements).
