= Earth Intruders =

Single by Björk

from the album Volta
- Released: 9 April 2007
- Recorded: 2006
- Length: 6:13 (album version); 6:13 (Jimmy Douglas Mix); 3:18 (single version); 4:26 (Mark Stent's extended edit); 4:26 (without outro)
- Label: One Little Indian; Atlantic
- Songwriters: Björk; Timothy Mosley; Nate Hills
- Producers: Björk; Timbaland; Danja

Björk singles chronology
"Triumph of a Heart" (2005)	"Earth Intruders" (2007)	"Innocence" (2007)

Music video
- "Earth Intruders" on YouTube

"Earth Intruders" is a song written and recorded by Icelandic singer Björk. The song was released as the lead single from her 2007 full-length studio album, Volta.

The single was released digitally in the US on 9 April and 21 April 2007 and in Europe on 28 April 2007. The single was released in a physical box set on 4 February 2008. Due to high digital download sales, it remains Björk's highest-charting single in the United States to date.

== Background ==
The first mention of "Earth Intruders" as a song title was made on All Access on 10 March 2007, and was later confirmed as the lead single through an article by The Guardian on 11 March 2007. On 26 March 2007, a distorted sample of the song was uploaded to YouTube as part of the viral marketing campaign for the Volta album. A fifteen-second sample of the track then appeared on the Rhino Records online ringtone website on 1 April 2007. The purchased ringtone featured a different clip (with different lyrics) to the one used in the online preview on the site; both audio samples were subsequently spread across music forums. On 3 April 2007 it was reported that the Björk section of the Rhino Records online ringtone store had been removed. After internet radio station WOXY played the song on 6 April 2007 the song was made widely available across file-sharing networks. "Earth Intruders" was sent to alternative radio stations for the week of 16 April 2007.

The album version of "Earth Intruders" was leaked to the internet on 24 April 2007 due to the full album being made available accidentally on the UK iTunes Store on 23 April 2007 for a total of six hours, two weeks before the album's official release date. Björk said of the song was based on a dream during a cross-Atlantic flight to New York where;

"a tsunami of millions and millions of poverty-stricken people" swelled high above the airplane she was a passenger on. Eventually, the wave overtook the plane, hit land and razed the White House into oblivion. "It's a quite chaotic song," she said of Volta's first single. "Lyrically, it's a collection of all of these images" burned into her memory, from her trip to Indonesia as well as her vivid, in-flight reverie."

"Earth Intruders" is co-produced by R&B record producer Timbaland and his protégé Danja. Congolese group Konono Nº1 play electric likembes on the song.

== Critical reception ==
"Earth Intruders" received critical acclaim from music critics. Drowned in Sound reviewer Mike Diver gave the song 9/10, praising it as "immediately catchy, compellingly left of centre, and undeniably unique". Digital Spy reviewer Miriam Zendle cited "Earth Intruders" as returning to Björk's earlier commercial sound, comparing it to her more recent albums that were "incredibly difficult to grasp hold of". Music website Popjustice called it the 80th greatest single of 2007.

== Music video ==
Screenshot from "Earth Intruders"

The music video for "Earth Intruders" was directed by Michel Ocelot. It was accomplished within strict time constraints through a combination of live-action, silhouette animation, 3D computer graphics, traditional animation, cut-outs and other special effects. "Kirikou" was danced by Legrand Bemba-Debert in a costume made, based on Ocelot's ideas, by paper sculptor Anne-Lise Kœhler. A preview was shown during Le Grand Journal show on French TV channel Canal+ on 17 April 2007. The full video was made available in the iTunes Store on 24 April 2007.

It features Björk's face floating in the background, first upside down, then upright, singing with her eyes closed. In the foreground, a large group of silhouetted tribal warriors dances in time to the music. The video features psychedelic colours and patterns imposed on an earthy backdrop. The video ends with Björk's face slowly fading into the middle of a glade, her eyes being opened just as she sings the last lyric. Ocelot stated that Björk had originally wanted Kirikou (the child-hero of Ocelot's Kirikou and the Sorceress and Kirikou et les bêtes sauvages) to be featured as a 20-year-old in the video. It was nominated for the 2007 Q Award for Best Video.

== Live performances ==
On 21 April 2007, a barefooted Björk appeared as the musical guest on an episode of the US comedy-variety show Saturday Night Live in promotion of the album. She performed the songs "Earth Intruders" and "Wanderlust". On 8 June 2007 (recorded on 5 June 2007), Björk performed, along with her tour musicians, on the UK television show Later...with Jools Holland for the fifth time in her solo career. She performed "Earth Intruders", "The Anchor Song", and "Declare Independence". Björk has also performed the song on every show of the Volta tour, usually as the very first song played after she enters the stage. Björk's set at Glastonbury Festival was broadcast on BBC Four on 22 June 2007, with "Earth Intruders" being the first song of the concert.

== Chart performance ==
"Earth Intruders" reached number 67 on the UK Official Download Chart, while the remix EP later released charted on its own at number 150. In the United States, the song debuted on the US Billboard Hot 100 at number 84 in the issue dated 28 April 2007. This is Björk's highest position on the US Hot 100, the previous being "Big Time Sensuality" in 1993, which peaked at number 88. The song also peaked at number 75 on the US Billboard Pop 100.

== Track listings ==
=== Club Mixes EP ===
A digital-only "Earth Intruders – Club Mixes" EP was released on the iTunes Store in the US/UK on 21 May 2007. The European iTunes release contained only three of the original five tracks. It is only the second time (the first being "Play Dead") that an instrumental of a Björk track has been officially released. With this release, it was determined that "Earth Intruders" would have no physical release in any territory worldwide. Also, the Mark Stent mix was initially labelled as an "Extended Edit", but on 23 May 2007, was retitled to "Radio Edit"; the "xxxChange Mix" was retitled from the previous non-descriptive title "Earth Intruders Remix".

1. Mark Stent Radio Edit – 4:26
2. xxxchange Mix – 4:38
3. Lexx Remix – 6:40
4. Lexx Edit – 4:05
5. Mark Stent Radio Edit Instrumental – 4:29

The European iTunes Store release omitted the tracks "Mark Stent Radio Edit" and "Lexx Edit".

=== Limited edition release ===
A limited edition "multiformat" box set was released at the beginning of February 2008 with slightly different artwork. The box set consists of a sticker-sealed fold out box with five nesting boxes containing two 12" vinyl singles, a CD, and a DVD in coloured paper sleeves.

=== 12-inch vinyl 1 ===
Side A. "Earth Intruders" (xxxchange Remix)
Side B. "Earth Intruders" (Jimmy Douglas Mix)

=== 12-inch vinyl 2 ===
Side C. "Earth Intruders" (Lexx 12" Remix)
Side D. "Earth Intruders" (Mark Stent Mix)

=== CD ===
1. "Earth Intruders" (Mark "Spike" Stent Mix)
2. "Earth Intruders" (Jimmy Douglas Mix)
3. "Earth Intruders" (Lexx Remix Radio Edit)
4. "Earth Intruders" (xxxchange Remix)
5. "Earth Intruders" (Lexx 12" Remix)

=== DVD ===
1. "Earth Intruders" (Video directed by Michel Ocelot)

== Charts ==
Chart performance for "Earth Intruders"
Chart (2007)	Peak position
Belgium (Ultratip Bubbling Under Flanders)	9
Belgium (Ultratip Bubbling Under Wallonia)	9
France (SNEP)	64
Greece (IFPI)	18
UK Singles (OCC)	78
US Billboard Hot 100	84
US Billboard Pop 100	75
