= Innocence (Björk song) =

Single by Björk

from the album Volta
- Released: 23 July 2007
- Length: 4:27
- Label: One Little Indian
- Songwriters: Björk; Timothy Mosley; Nate Hills
- Producers: Björk; Timbaland; Danja

Björk singles chronology
"Earth Intruders" (2007)	"Innocence" (2007)	"Declare Independence" (2008)

Electronic release artwork
- Only used with the electronic release of the EP and on promotional CD singles from 2007.

"Innocence" is a song written and recorded by Icelandic singer Björk. The song was released as the second single from her sixth full-length studio album, Volta. It is co-produced by record producer Timbaland and his protégé Danja. The song was premiered on Björk's MySpace profile on 19 March 2007 as part of the fan contest to submit ideas for the music video. The single was released exclusively as a digital download on 23 July 2007.

== Music video contest ==
A fan contest to submit ideas for the music video for "Innocence" was announced in a news article on bjork.com on 19 March 2007, with the intention being that Björk would work with the chosen fan director to fully flesh out the video idea. The original deadline for the competition was to be on July 10; however, due to the worldwide success of Volta, Björk had to perform more international promotion work than her label One Little Indian had originally planned, meaning that the previously-planned video shoot for "Declare Independence" in London could not take place. The decision was subsequently made to move the deadline for the contest forward by a month to June 10 in order to release the track "Innocence" (then slated as the third single from the album) around the same period that "Declare Independence" would have been originally released. The decision was met with mixed reactions by fans as many were subsequently unable to submit their ideas due to the new deadline. The shooting for the video of "Declare Independence" (originally announced as the album's second single) was rescheduled to August. Many of the videos entered into the competition can be viewed on YouTube.

On 27 July 2007 bjork.com announced that the winner of the video contest was to be decided via an online poll (reminiscent of the online poll used to decide on the track listing for the Greatest Hits album) from a shortlist of eleven videos. On 7 August 2007, the winners, a French duo known only as Fred & Annabelle, were chosen.

== Commercial performance ==
Perhaps because of the lack of a physical release, "Innocence" failed to chart in the UK, becoming only the third single of Björk's career up until this point not to chart, the first being "Jóga" in 1997 (the EP charted at number 191 in 1998, however), and the second being "Oceania" in 2004.

== Track listings ==
=== Digital EP ===
A digital-only EP was released on the iTunes Store in various countries on 23 July 2007 and made available in the United States and other territories on 31 July 2007. The original release was reported to include 3 additional tracks - "Innocence" (Simian Mobile Disco Remix Radio Edit), "Innocence" (Mark Stent Instrumental) and "Innocence" (Simian Mobile Disco Dub Remix). These tracks were omitted from the final digital release for unknown reasons, but they were present on promotional CDs which aren't commercially available. The Mark Stent track refers to an alternate mix of the album version (originally mixed by Jimmy Douglas), although very little difference can be heard. On 23 July 2007 bjork.com released the full artwork from the single as a PDF file, seen by some as a concession to the lack of a physical release.

1. "Innocence" (Mark Stent Radio Edit)
2. "Innocence" (Simian Mobile Disco 12" Remix)
3. "Innocence" (Alva Noto Unitxt Remodel 12" Remix)
4. "Innocence" (Ghostigital Untouchable Innocence Still Amazes Fearless Remix)

=== Limited edition double pack (12", CD and DVD) ===
A limited edition "multiformat" box set was released at the beginning of March 2008 with different artwork and with two of the missing remixes added. The box set consists of a sticker-sealed fold out box with five nesting boxes containing two 12" vinyl singles, a CD and a DVD in coloured paper sleeves.

==== 12" double heavyweight vinyl ====
1. "Innocence" (Simian Mobile Disco 12" remix)
2. "Innocence" (Alvo Noto Unitxt remodel 12" remix)
3. "Innocence" (Mark Stent Remix)
4. "Innocence" (Ghostigital Untouchable Innocence Still Amazes 12")
5. "Innocence" (Jimmy Douglas Mix)
6. "Innocence" (Simian Mobile Disco Dub)
7. "Innocence" (Mark Stent Instrumental)

==== CD ====
1. "Innocence" (Simian Mobile Disco 12"remix)
2. "Innocence" (Alvo Noto Unitxt remodel 12" remix)
3. "Innocence" (Mark Stent Remix)
4. "Innocence" (Ghostigital Untouchable Innocence Still Amazes 12")
5. "Innocence" (Jimmy Douglas Mix)
6. "Innocence" (Simian Mobile Disco Dub)
7. "Innocence" (Mark Stent Instrumental)

==== DVD ====
All tracks are written by Björk, Timothy Mosley (Timbaland), Nate Hills (Danja).

No.	Title	Length
1.	"Innocence Video - Fred & Annabelle" (Competition winner)	4:29
2.	"Innocence Video - Christiano Leal" (Runner-up)	4:30
3.	"Innocence Video - Davood Saghiri" (Runner-up)	4:10
4.	"Innocence Video - Dimitri Stankowicz" (Runner-up)	1:18
5.	"Innocence Video - Étienne Strubbe" (Runner-up)	1:11
6.	"Innocence Video - Julien Himmer" (Runner-up)	3:53
7.	"Innocence Video - Laurent Labouille" (Runner-up)	4:29
8.	"Innocence Video - Mario Caporali" (Runner-up)	4:29
9.	"Innocence Video - Mik o_o Armellino" (Runner-up)	2:29
10.	"Innocence Video - Misi Park & Jean-Pierre Khazem" (Runner-up)	4:11
11.	"Innocence Video - Roland Matusek" (Runner-up)	4:11
12.	"Innocence Video - [Credits]" (Credit Roll, without sound)	0:35
13.	"Innocence Audio - Dolby Digital 5.1 & DTS" (Album Version)	4:10
14.	"Innocence Audio - Remix" (Mark Stent - radio edit)	4:20
15.	"Innocence Audio - Remix" (Simian Mobile Disco - radio edit)	4:10
16.	"Innocence Audio - Remix" (Carsten Nicolai - Alva Noto Unitxt removed 12" remix)	6:13
17.	"Innocence Audio - Remix" (Ghostigital Untouchable - Innocence Still Amazes 12" remix)	5:27
18.	"Innocence Audio - Remix" (Simian Mobile Disco - remix 12")	7:44
19.	"Innocence Audio - Remix" (Mark Stent - Instrumental)	4:21
20.	"Innocence Audio - Remix" (Simian Mobile Disco - dub remix)	7:42

== Charts ==
Chart performance for "Innocence"
Chart (2007)	Peak position
European Singles Chart	50
Greece (IFPI Greece)	16
Italy (Musica e dischi)	9
