= WOW HD =

British online store

- Type: Private
- Industry: Retail; Record store Ecommerce
- Founded: 2000, London, England
- Headquarters: Worldwide
- Products: Recorded music, videos, DVDs, books, computer games, beauty
- Parent: DirectToU, LLC
- Website: http://www.wowhd.co.uk/

WOW HD is an online store that mainly sells physical copies of pre-recorded music and videos.

== History ==
Under its previous name, CD WOW!, the retailer began operating in the UK in 2000, offering CDs and DVDs at lower prices than the high street.

In 2004 the company was taken to court by the British Phonographic Industry, the recording industry association for the UK, for selling CDs at prices that often undercut UK retail prices by 25% as although the CDs in question were legal, many of them were licensed for sale and distribution in other markets and thus priced accordingly for those markets. The BPI, acting on behalf of its members, saw the lower priced albums as damaging to the UK and European markets and took the company's former owners Music Trading On-Line (HK) Ltd to the High Court, citing UK's Copyright, Designs and Patents Act of 1988. This resulted in CD WOW! being ordered not to sell titles that were not licensed for sale in Europe, and claiming it had to increase the price of all CDs. On 29 May 2007, the former owners of CD WOW! were ordered by the High Court to pay £41 million in damages to the BPI for breaching the 2004 agreement over the sale of imported CDs.

On 1 September 2007, CD WOW! was bought by Stomp Pty. Ltd. In May 2008, CD WOW! launched a new site design in the UK, Ireland and the US, and changed its domain name from cd-wow.com to cdwow.com. In September 2008 CD WOW! launched a new front end for all its domains including a new domain in the Netherlands. It also started offering cosmetics and perfumes on all the sites via its wowwoman.com domain.

In September 2010, the ownership of CD WOW! was transferred to a new Australian company, Elan Media Partners, which had acquired Stomp. On 20 February 2012, CD WOW! changed its name to WOW HD.

Since mid-2015, WOW HD has been owned by DirectToU, LLC, who also operate sites such as deepdiscount.com and Amazon Marketplace/eBay seller All Your Music.

== Business ==
WOW HD offers customers three ways to pay: through its own checkout using a credit or debit card, through PayPal, or through Google Checkout, so no sign-in is needed to make a purchase.
