= List of awards and nominations received by Björk =

Björk awards and nominations
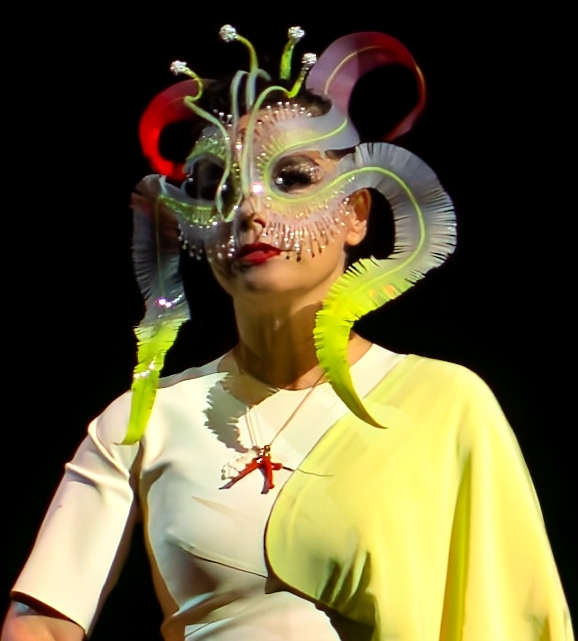
- Björk performing in 2016
Awards and nominations
Award	Wins	Nominations
Academy Awards	0	1
Brit Awards	5	11
Cannes Film Festival	2	2
Golden Globe Awards	0	2
Grammy Awards	0	19
Polar Music Prize	1	1

Totals (Note: Certain award groups do not simply award one winner. They acknowledge several different recipients, have runners-up, and have third place. Since this is a specific recognition and is different from losing an award, runner-up mentions are considered wins in this award tally. For simplification and to avoid errors, each award in this list has been presumed to have had a prior nomination.)
- Wins: 145
- Nominations: 339

Björk is an Icelandic singer-songwriter, producer and actress from Reykjavík who has received many awards and nominations for her work. After gaining international popularity as the lead singer of The Sugarcubes, she rose to prominence with the release of her first album Debut in 1993. During this time, she won several awards, including the Brit Award for International Breakthrough Act and the NME Award for Best Solo Artist. At the 1994 MTV Video Music Awards the music video for her first single "Human Behaviour" received six nominations. With the release of her second album Post (1995) the singer won five Icelandic Music Awards and the MTV Europe Music Award for Best Female and became the first artist to receive the Vanguard Award at the ASCAP Awards. The video for her single "It's Oh So Quiet" won the MTV Video Music Award for Best Choreography in a Video. The singer's third album, titled Homogenic, was released in 1997. The album's music videos were acclaimed, with the videos for "Bachelorette", directed by Michel Gondry, and "All Is Full of Love", directed by Chris Cunningham, receiving multiple accolades, including three MTV Video Music Awards for Best Art Direction, Breakthrough Video and Best Visual Effects.

In 2000, Björk starred in Lars von Trier's musical melodrama film Dancer in the Dark, which premiered at the 2000 Cannes Film Festival, winning the Palme d'Or. For her role as Selma Ježková in the movie, the singer received the Cannes Film Festival Award for Best Actress and the European Film Award for Best Actress and garnered a nomination for the Golden Globe Award for Best Actress in a Motion Picture – Drama. Björk also composed the movie's soundtrack Selmasongs, which included the song "I've Seen It All". The song received a nomination for Best Original Song at the 58th Golden Globe Awards and was also nominated in the Best Original Song category at the 73rd Academy Awards, during which Björk wore her famous swan dress.

The music video for "Wanderlust", the fourth single from her sixth studio album Volta (2007), was one of the world's first music videos shot in stereoscopic 3D and received numerous accolades, including three UK Music Video Awards. In 2010, she received the Polar Music Prize, bestowed from the Royal Swedish Academy of Music, an honor considered the "Nobel Prize of Music". With the release of her seventh album Biophilia (2011), Björk garnered the Artist of the Year prize from the Webby Awards and the MPG Innovation Award from the Music Producers Guild. Biophilia and its related app were included in the Museum of Modern Art permanent collection. In 2015, the museum honored the singer with a self-titled artist retrospective, curated by Klaus Biesenbach. After the exhibition, Björk conceived Björk Digital, an immersive exhibit, in which she displayed virtual reality videos for songs taken from her eight studio album Vulnicura (2015). The visual for the song "Notget" won the Grand Prix in the Digital Craft category at the 2017 Cannes Lions International Festival of Creativity.

Björk is the fourth most successful international artist at the Brit Awards, with five awards won, and she's also the artist with the most wins and nominations in the International Female Solo Artist category. With nineteen nominations accrued at the Grammy Awards, she's second solo artist and the female artist with the most nominations without winning. Aside from her accolades in music and film, the singer received the Order of the Falcon from the President of Iceland in 1997 and the Ordre national du Mérite from the President of France in 2001. In 2015, she was included in Time's list of the 100 most influential people in the world. In 2023 Björk was awarded an honorary doctorate by the Iceland University of the Arts, citing her as "the trailblazer who effectively brought Icelandic music into the international spotlight". The following year, she was named as the eight honorary citizen of Reykjavík by the City Council, which also agreed that artist Gabríela Friðriksdóttir, in collaboration with the Reykjavik Art Museum, would be commissioned to create a statue of Björk.

== Awards and nominations ==
Awards and nominations received by Björk
Award	Year (Note: Indicates the year of ceremony. Each year is linked to the article about the awards held that year, wherever possible.)	Recipient(s) and nominee(s)	Category	Result	Ref.
Academy Awards	2001	"I've Seen It All"	Best Original Song in a Motion Picture	Nominated	
AIM Independent Music Awards	2011	Björk	Outstanding Contribution to Music	Honoree	
AIM Independent Music Awards	2015	Vulnicura	Independent Album of the Year	Nominated	
AIM Independent Music Awards	2015	Coloured Vinyl Catalogue Reissue	Special Catalogue Release of the Year	Nominated	
AIM Independent Music Awards	2023	Björk	Best Live Performer	Won	
AIM Independent Music Awards	2023	"Ovule" (Sega Bodega Remix) (featuring Shygirl)	Best Independent Remix	Nominated	
AIM Independent Music Awards	2024	"Oral" (Olof Dreijer Remix) (featuring Rosalía)	Best Independent Remix	Nominated	
American Music Awards	2026	"Berghain" (with Rosalía and Yves Tumor)	Best Music Video	Nominated	
Annie Awards	1997	"I Miss You"	Best Animated Short Subject	Won	
Antville Music Video Awards	2005	"Triumph of a Heart"	Best Video	Nominated	
Antville Music Video Awards	2005	"Where Is the Line"	Worst Video	Nominated	
Antville Music Video Awards	2008	"Wanderlust"	Best Animated Video	Nominated	
Antville Music Video Awards	2008	"Wanderlust"	Best Art Direction	Won	
Antville Music Video Awards	2008	"Wanderlust"	Best Music Video of the Year	Won	
Antville Music Video Awards	2011	"Crystalline"	Best Art Direction	Nominated	
Antville Music Video Awards	2012	"Mutual Core"	Best Art Direction	Nominated	
Antville Music Video Awards	2012	"Mutual Core"	Best Visual Effects	Won	
ArtFutura Festival	1999	"All Is Full of Love"	Jury Prize	Won	
ASCAP Awards	1996	Björk	ASCAP Vanguard Award	Honoree	
Australian Effects and Animation Festival	2000	"All Is Full of Love"	Best Music Video	Won	
Awards Circuit Community Awards	2000	Björk (for Dancer in the Dark)	Best Actress in a Leading Role	Nominated	
BBC Radio 3 Awards for World Music	2005	Björk	Boundary Crossing	Nominated	
Billboard Music Video Awards	1998	"Bachelorette"	Best Alternative/Modern Rock Clip	Nominated	
Bodil Awards	2001	Björk (for Dancer in the Dark)	Best Actress in a Leading Role	Won	
Brit Awards	1994	Björk	International Breakthrough Act	Won	
Brit Awards	1994	Björk	International Female Solo Artist	Won	
Brit Awards	1996	Björk	International Female Solo Artist	Won	
Brit Awards	1998	Björk	International Female Solo Artist	Won	
Brit Awards	2001	Selmasongs	Soundtrack/Cast Recording	Nominated	
Brit Awards	2002	Björk	International Female Solo Artist	Nominated	
Brit Awards	2006	Björk	International Female Solo Artist	Nominated	
Brit Awards	2008	Björk	International Female Solo Artist	Nominated	
Brit Awards	2012	Björk	International Female Solo Artist	Nominated	
Brit Awards	2016	Björk	International Female Solo Artist	Won	
Brit Awards	2018	Björk	International Female Solo Artist	Nominated	
Brit Insurance Design Awards	2010	Voltaïc	Graphics Award	Nominated	
Bröste Optimist Award	1999	Björk	Bröste Optimist Award	Honoree	
BT Digital Music Awards	2008	Björk	Best Electronic Artist or DJ	Nominated	
Berlin Music Video Awards	2016	"Mouth Mantra"	Best Visual Effects	Nominated	
Berlin Music Video Awards	2018	"Utopia"	Best Art Direction	Nominated	
Cannes Film Festival	2000	Björk (for Dancer in the Dark)	Best Actress	Won	
Cannes Film Festival	2025	Björk	Humann Impact Prize (Note: The prize was presented as part of the 10th Positive Cinema Week, a parallel section of the Cannes Film Festival.)	Honoree	
Cannes Lions International Festival of Creativity	2017	"Notget"	Grand Prix – Digital Craft	Won	
Cannes Lions International Festival of Creativity	2026	"Berghain" (with Rosalía and Yves Tumor)	Grand Prix – Entertainment Lions for Music	Won	
Chicago Film Critics Association Awards	2001	Björk (for Dancer in the Dark)	Best Actress	Nominated	
Chicago Film Critics Association Awards	2001	Björk (for Dancer in the Dark)	Most Promising Actress	Nominated	
Chicago Film Critics Association Awards	2001	Selmasongs	Best Original Score	Nominated	
Chlotrudis Awards	2001	Björk (for Dancer in the Dark)	Best Actress	Nominated	
D&AD Awards	1996	"Hyperballad"	Special Effects – Graphite Pencil	Won	
D&AD Awards	1996	"It's Oh So Quiet"	Direction – Graphite Pencil	Won	
D&AD Awards	1996	"Isobel"	Cinematography – Wood Pencil	Won	
D&AD Awards	1998	"Bachelorette"	Pop Promo Video with a budget over £40.000 – Yellow Pencil	Won	
D&AD Awards	1998	Homogenic	Individual Compact Disks, Tapes and Record Sleeves – Wood Pencil	Won	
D&AD Awards	2000	"All Is Full of Love"	Direction – Black Pencil	Won	
D&AD Awards	2000	"All Is Full of Love"	Cinematography – Yellow Pencil	Won	
D&AD Awards	2000	"All Is Full of Love"	Animation – Yellow Pencil	Won	
D&AD Awards	2000	"All Is Full of Love"	Special Effects – Yellow Pencil	Won	
D&AD Awards	2003	"Nature Is Ancient"	Animation – Wood Pencil	Won	
D&AD Awards	2004	"Desired Constellation"	Direction – Yellow Pencil	Won	
D&AD Awards	2004	"Unravel"	Direction – Yellow Pencil	Won	
D&AD Awards	2004	"Pluto"	Direction – Graphite Pencil	Won	
D&AD Awards	2004	"It's in Our Hands" (Soft Pink Truth Mix)	Direction – Wood Pencil	Won	
D&AD Awards	2004	"Nameless"	Direction – Wood Pencil	Won	
D&AD Awards	2005	"Triumph of a Heart"	Direction – Yellow Pencil	Won	
D&AD Awards	2005	"Who Is It"	Cinematography – Wood Pencil	Won	
D&AD Awards	2005	"Oceania"	Animation – Wood Pencil	Won	
D&AD Awards	2008	"Declare Independence"	Art Direction – Graphite Pencil	Won	
D&AD Awards	2009	"Wanderlust"	Art Direction – Yellow Pencil	Won	
D&AD Awards	2009	"Wanderlust"	Music Videos – Yellow Pencil	Won	
D&AD Awards	2009	"Wanderlust"	Special Effects – Yellow Pencil	Won	
D&AD Awards	2017	Making of Björk Digital	Digital Installations – Wood Pencil	Won	
Danish Music Awards	1994	Björk	Best New International Act	Won	
Danish Music Awards	1994	Björk	Best International Female	Won	
Danish Music Awards	1996	Björk	Best International Female	Won	
Danish Music Awards	1998	Björk	Best International Female	Won	
Edda Awards	2000	Björk (for Dancer in the Dark)	Best Actress	Won	
European Festival Awards	2014	Björk	Headliner Of The Year	Nominated	
European Film Awards	2000	Björk (for Dancer in the Dark)	Best Actress	Won	
European Film Awards	2000	Björk (for Dancer in the Dark)	Jameson People's Choice Award for Best European Actress	Won	
Fantasporto	2000	"Hunter"	Audience Choice	Won	
Fantasporto	2000	"All Is Full of Love"	Best Video	Won	
GAFFA Awards (Denmark)	1993	Björk	International Solo Artist of the Year	Won	
GAFFA Awards (Denmark)	1993	Björk	Most Underrated	Nominated	
GAFFA Awards (Denmark)	1993	Björk	New Artist of the Year	Won	
GAFFA Awards (Denmark)	1993	Debut	Album of the Year	Nominated	
GAFFA Awards (Denmark)	1993	"Human Behaviour"	Video of the Year	Won	
GAFFA Awards (Denmark)	1994	Björk	International Solo Artist of the Year	Won	
GAFFA Awards (Denmark)	1995	Björk	International Solo Artist of the Year	Won	
GAFFA Awards (Denmark)	1996	Björk	International Solo Artist of the Year	Nominated	
GAFFA Awards (Denmark)	1997	Björk	International Female Artist of the Year	Won	
GAFFA Awards (Denmark)	1997	Homogenic	International Album of the Year	Nominated	
GAFFA Awards (Denmark)	2001	Björk	International Female Artist of the Year	Won	
GAFFA Awards (Denmark)	2004	Björk	International Female Artist of the Year	Won	
GAFFA Awards (Denmark)	2004	Medúlla	International Album of the Year	Nominated	
GAFFA Awards (Denmark)	2007	Björk	International Female Artist of the Year	Nominated	
GAFFA Awards (Denmark)	2011	Björk	International Female Artist of the Year	Nominated	
GAFFA Awards (Denmark)	2011	"Crystalline"	International Video of the Year	Won	
GAFFA Awards (Denmark)	2015	Björk	International Female Artist of the Year	Nominated	
GAFFA Awards (Sweden)	2018	Utopia	International Album of the Year	Nominated	
GAFFA Awards (Sweden)	2018	Björk	International Solo Artist of the Year	Won	
Geneva International Film Festival	2017	"Notget"	VR work international competition	Won	
Golden Globe Awards	2001	Björk (for Dancer in the Dark)	Best Actress in a Motion Picture – Drama	Nominated	
Golden Globe Awards	2001	"I've Seen It All"	Best Original Song	Nominated	
Grammy Awards (Note: Björk's recordings have received two additional nominations, both of which were credited to the respective art directors and not to herself. At the 46th Annual Grammy Awards in 2004, Gabríela Friðriksdóttir, Mathias Augustyniak and Michael Amzalag were nominated in the Best Boxed or Special Limited Edition Package category for her boxset Family Tree. Similarly, at the 2013 ceremony, Augustyniak and Amzalag won in the Best Recording Package category for Biophilia.)	1994	"Human Behaviour"	Best Music Video, Short Form	Nominated	
Grammy Awards	1996	"It's Oh So Quiet"	Best Music Video, Short Form	Nominated	
Grammy Awards	1996	Post	Best Alternative Music Performance	Nominated	
Grammy Awards	1998	Homogenic	Best Alternative Music Performance	Nominated	
Grammy Awards	1999	"Bachelorette"	Best Short Form Music Video	Nominated	
Grammy Awards	2000	"All Is Full of Love"	Best Short Form Music Video	Nominated	
Grammy Awards	2001	"Overture"	Best Pop Instrumental Performance	Nominated	
Grammy Awards	2001	"I've Seen It All"	Best Pop Instrumental Arrangement Accompanying A Vocalist(s)	Nominated	
Grammy Awards	2002	Vespertine	Best Alternative Music Album	Nominated	
Grammy Awards	2005	"Oceania"	Best Female Pop Vocal Performance	Nominated	
Grammy Awards	2005	Medúlla	Best Alternative Music Album	Nominated	
Grammy Awards	2008	Volta	Best Alternative Music Album	Nominated	
Grammy Awards	2013	Biophilia	Best Alternative Music Album	Nominated	
Grammy Awards	2016	Vulnicura	Best Alternative Music Album	Nominated	
Grammy Awards	2019	Utopia	Best Alternative Music Album	Nominated	
Grammy Awards	2023	Fossora	Best Alternative Music Album	Nominated	
Grammy Awards	2027	"Berghain" (with Rosalía and Yves Tumor)	Record of the Year	Pending	
Grammy Awards	2027	"Berghain" (with Rosalía and Yves Tumor)	Song of the Year	Pending	
Hungarian Music Awards	2012	Biophilia	International Alternative Album of the Year	Nominated	
Iceland's Artist's Honorary Award	2025	Björk	Iceland's Artist's Honorary Award	Nominated	
Icelandic Music Awards	1994	"Venus as a Boy"	Song of the Year	Nominated	
Icelandic Music Awards	1994	Debut	Album of the Year	Nominated	
Icelandic Music Awards	1994	Björk	Female Singer of the Year	Won	
Icelandic Music Awards	1994	Björk	Composer of the Year	Nominated	
Icelandic Music Awards	1994	Björk	Songwriter of the Year	Nominated	
Icelandic Music Awards	1995	Björk	Female Singer of the Year	Nominated	
Icelandic Music Awards	1996	"Army of Me"	Song of the Year	Won	
Icelandic Music Awards	1996	"Isobel"	Song of the Year	Nominated	
Icelandic Music Awards	1996	Post	Album of the Year	Won	
Icelandic Music Awards	1996	Björk	Band/Artist of the Year	Won	
Icelandic Music Awards	1996	Björk	Female Singer of the Year	Won	
Icelandic Music Awards	1996	Björk	Composer of the Year	Won	
Icelandic Music Awards	1996	Björk	Songwriter of the Year	Nominated	
Icelandic Music Awards	1997	Björk	Female Singer of the Year	Nominated	
Icelandic Music Awards	1998	"Jóga"	Song of the Year	Won	
Icelandic Music Awards	1998	"Bachelorette"	Song of the Year	Nominated	
Icelandic Music Awards	1998	Homogenic	Album of the Year	Won	
Icelandic Music Awards	1998	Björk	Artist of the Year	Won	
Icelandic Music Awards	1998	Björk	Female Singer of the Year	Won	
Icelandic Music Awards	1998	Björk	Composer of the Year	Won	
Icelandic Music Awards	1998	Björk	Songwriter of the Year	Nominated	
Icelandic Music Awards	1999	Björk	Artist of the Year	Won	
Icelandic Music Awards	1999	Björk	Female Singer of the Year	Won	
Icelandic Music Awards	2000	Björk	Artist of the Year	Won	
Icelandic Music Awards	2000	Björk	Female Singer of the Year	Nominated	
Icelandic Music Awards	2002	"Pagan Poetry"	Song of the Year	Nominated	
Icelandic Music Awards	2002	"Pagan Poetry"	Video of the Year	Nominated	
Icelandic Music Awards	2002	Vespertine	Album of the Year	Nominated	
Icelandic Music Awards	2002	Björk	Female Singer of the Year	Won	
Icelandic Music Awards	2002	Björk	Performer of the Year	Nominated	
Icelandic Music Awards	2005	Medúlla	Pop Album of the Year	Nominated	
Icelandic Music Awards	2005	Björk	Female Singer of the Year	Nominated	
Icelandic Music Awards	2005	"Oceania"	Video of the Year	Won	
Icelandic Music Awards	2005	"Who Is It"	Video of the Year	Nominated	
Icelandic Music Awards	2006	Drawing Restraint 9	Alternative Album of the Year	Nominated	
Icelandic Music Awards	2008	Volta	Alternative Album of the Year	Nominated	
Icelandic Music Awards	2008	Björk	Female Singer of the Year	Won	
Icelandic Music Awards	2008	Björk	Performer of the Year	Won	
Icelandic Music Awards	2009	"Wanderlust"	Video of the Year	Won	
Icelandic Music Awards	2009	Björk	Performer of the Year	Nominated	
Icelandic Music Awards	2012	Biophilia	Pop/Rock Album of the Year	Nominated	
Icelandic Music Awards	2012	"Crystalline"	Pop/Rock Song of the Year	Nominated	
Icelandic Music Awards	2012	Björk	Pop, Rock, Jazz or Blues Female Singer of the Year	Nominated	
Icelandic Music Awards	2012	Björk	Pop, Rock, Jazz or Blues Performer of the Year	Won	
Icelandic Music Awards	2012	Biophilia tour live at Harpa	Musical Event of the Year	Won	
Icelandic Music Awards	2013	"Mutual Core"	Music Video of the Year	Nominated	
Icelandic Music Awards	2016	Vulnicura	Pop Album of the Year	Won	
Icelandic Music Awards	2016	"Stonemilker"	Pop Song of the Year	Nominated	
Icelandic Music Awards	2016	Björk	Female Singer of the Year	Won	
Icelandic Music Awards	2016	Björk	Songwriter of the Year	Won	
Icelandic Music Awards	2016	Björk	Producer of the Year	Won	
Icelandic Music Awards	2018	Björk	Composer of the Year	Nominated	
Icelandic Music Awards	2018	Utopia	Pop Album of the Year	Nominated	
Icelandic Music Awards	2018	Utopia	Album Art of the Year	Nominated	
Icelandic Music Awards	2022	Björk Orkestral live at Harpa	Musical Event of the Year	Won	
Icelandic Music Awards	2023	Fossora	Alternative Album of the Year	Won	
Icelandic Music Awards	2023	Fossora	Recording Direction of the Year	Won	
Icelandic Music Awards	2023	Fossora	Album Cover of the Year	Nominated	
Icelandic Music Awards	2023	"Ancestress"	Music Video of the Year	Nominated	
Icelandic Music Awards	2024	"Oral" (featuring Rosalía)	Best of Pop, Rock, Hip-Hop & Electronic - Composition of the Year	Nominated	
Icelandic Music Awards	2026	Björk	Performers of the Year – Other Music	Nominated	
Icelandic Music Awards	2026	Cornucopia Live	Album Artwork of the Year	Nominated	
IFPI Platinum Europe Awards	1996	Post	Award Level 1	Won	
IFPI Platinum Europe Awards	2001	Homogenic	Award Level 1	Won	
Imagina Prize	1999	"Hunter"	Prix PIXEL-INA Vidéoclip	Nominated	
Imagina Prize	2000	"All Is Full of Love"	Prix PIXEL-INA Best Script	Nominated	
International Dance Music Awards	1996	Björk	Best Female Artist	Won	
International Monitor Awards	2000	"All Is Full of Love"	Best Special Effects in a Video	Won	
International Monitor Awards	2000	"All Is Full of Love"	Best 3D Animation Music Video	Won	
Italian Music Awards	2002	Björk	Best International Female Artist	Nominated	
Italian Music Prize	1996	Björk	Female Artist of the Year	Won	
Las Vegas Film Critics Society Awards	2000	Björk (for Dancer in the Dark)	Best Actress	Nominated	
Las Vegas Film Critics Society Awards	2000	Björk (for Dancer in the Dark)	Best Female Newcomer	Nominated	
Libera Awards	2023	Björk	A2IM Humanitarian Award	Nominated	
Libera Awards	2023	Fossora	Best Pop Record	Nominated	
London Effects and Animation Festival Awards	2000	"All Is Full of Love"	Music Videos	Won	
London Effects and Animation Festival Awards	2001	"Cocoon"	Music Videos	Nominated	
Los Angeles Film Critics Association Awards	2000	Selmasongs	Best Music	Nominated	
Lovie Awards	2011	Björk	Lifetime Achievement	Honoree	
Lunas del Auditorio	2012	Biophilia tour live at Cumbre Tajín	Alternative Performance	Nominated	
Meteor Music Awards	2008	Volta tour live at Electric Picnic	Best International Live Performance	Nominated	
Meteor Music Awards	2008	Björk	Best International Female	Nominated	
Mojo Awards	2007	Björk	Inspiration Award	Honoree	
MTV Digital Days	2015	"Stonemilker"	Best Innovative Video	Nominated	
MTV Europe Music Awards	1994	"Big Time Sensuality"	Best Song	Nominated	
MTV Europe Music Awards	1994	Björk	Best Female	Nominated	
MTV Europe Music Awards	1995	Björk	Best Female	Won	
MTV Europe Music Awards	1996	Björk	Best Female	Nominated	
MTV Europe Music Awards	1997	Björk	Best Female	Nominated	
MTV Europe Music Awards	1999	"All Is Full of Love"	Best Video	Nominated	
MTV Europe Music Awards	2004	Björk	Best Alternative	Nominated	
MTV Video Music Awards	1993	"Human Behaviour"	International Viewer's Choice Award — MTV Europe	Nominated	
MTV Video Music Awards	1994	"Human Behaviour"	Best Female Video	Nominated	
MTV Video Music Awards	1994	"Human Behaviour"	Best New Artist in a Video	Nominated	
MTV Video Music Awards	1994	"Human Behaviour"	Breakthrough Video	Nominated	
MTV Video Music Awards	1994	"Human Behaviour"	Best Special Effects in a Video	Nominated	
MTV Video Music Awards	1994	"Human Behaviour"	Best Editing in a Video	Nominated	
MTV Video Music Awards	1994	"Human Behaviour"	Best Art Direction in a Video	Nominated	
MTV Video Music Awards	1995	"Army of Me"	Best Special Effects in a Video	Nominated	
MTV Video Music Awards	1995	"Army of Me"	International Viewer's Choice Award — MTV Europe	Nominated	
MTV Video Music Awards	1996	"It's Oh So Quiet"	Best Choreography in a Video	Won	
MTV Video Music Awards	1996	"It's Oh So Quiet"	Best Female Video	Nominated	
MTV Video Music Awards	1996	"It's Oh So Quiet"	Breakthrough Video	Nominated	
MTV Video Music Awards	1996	"It's Oh So Quiet"	Best Direction in a Video	Nominated	
MTV Video Music Awards	1996	"It's Oh So Quiet"	Best Art Direction in a Video	Nominated	
MTV Video Music Awards	1996	"It's Oh So Quiet"	International Viewer's Choice Award — MTV Europe	Nominated	
MTV Video Music Awards	1998	"Bachelorette"	Best Art Direction in a Video	Won	
MTV Video Music Awards	2000	"All Is Full of Love"	Breakthrough Video	Won	
MTV Video Music Awards	2000	"All Is Full of Love"	Best Special Effects in a Video	Won	
MTV Video Music Awards	2009	"Human Behaviour"	Best Video (That Should Have Won a Moonman)	Nominated	
MTV Video Music Awards Japan	2002	www.bjork.com	Best Website	Nominated	
MTV Video Music Awards Japan	2012	"Crystalline"	Best Female Video	Nominated	
Music Producers Guild Awards	2009	Björk	The Joe Meek Award for Innovation in Production	Nominated	
Music Producers Guild Awards	2011	Björk	The Joe Meek Award for Innovation in Production	Nominated	
Music Producers Guild Awards	2013	Björk	The MPG Innovation Award	Honoree	
Music Producers Guild Awards	2016	Björk	International Producer of the Year	Nominated	
Music Video Festival	2017	"Family"	Innovation	Won	
Music Week Awards	2000	"All Is Full of Love"	Best Art Direction in a Video	Won	
Music Week Awards	2000	"All Is Full of Love"	Best Special Effects in a Video	Won	
Music Week Awards	2000	"All Is Full of Love"	Best Alternative Video	Nominated	
Music Week Awards	2000	"All Is Full of Love"	Best Cinematography	Nominated	
Music Week Awards	2000	"All Is Full of Love"	Best Editing in a Video	Nominated	
National Board of Review Awards	2001	Björk (for Dancer in the Dark)	Outstanding Dramatic Music Performance	Won	
New York Film Critics Circle Awards	2001	Björk (for Dancer in the Dark)	Best Actress	Nominated	
NME Awards	1994	Björk	Object of Desire	Won	
NME Awards	1994	Björk	Best Solo Artist	Won	
NME Awards	1998	Björk	Best Solo Artist	Nominated	
NME Awards	2012	Biophilia	Best Album Artwork	Nominated	
Nordic Council Music Prize	1995	Björk	Nordic Council Music Prize	Nominated	
Nordic Council Music Prize	1997	Björk	Nordic Council Music Prize	Won	
Nordic Music Prize	2012	Biophilia	Best Nordic Album	Nominated	
Nordic Music Prize	2016	Vulnicura	Best Nordic Album	Nominated	
Nordic Music Prize	2018	Utopia	Best Nordic Album	Nominated	
O Music Awards	2011	Björk	Digital Genius	Honoree	
Online Film Critics Society Awards	2001	Björk (for Dancer in the Dark)	Best Actress	Nominated	
Online Film Critics Society Awards	2001	Björk (for Dancer in the Dark)	Best Breakthrough Performance	Won	
Online Film Critics Society Awards	2001	Selmasongs	Best Original Score	Nominated	
Online Film & Television Association Awards	1996	Björk	Best Female Solo Artist	Nominated	
Online Film & Television Association Awards	1996	"It's Oh So Quiet"	Best Female Solo Song	Nominated	
Online Film & Television Association Awards	1997	Homogenic	Best Alternative Album	Nominated	
Online Film & Television Association Awards	2001	Björk (for Dancer in the Dark)	Best Female Breakthrough Performance	Nominated	
Online Film & Television Association Awards	2001	Selmasongs	Best Original Score	Nominated	
Online Film & Television Association Awards	2001	"I've Seen It All"	Best Original Song	Won	
Online Film & Television Association Awards	2001	"New World"	Best Original Song	Nominated	
Online Film & Television Association Awards	2001	"Next to Last Song"	Best Cinematic Moment	Nominated	
Online Music Awards	2000	Björk	Favorite Female Artist	Won	
Online Music Awards	2000	Björk	Sexiest Female	Nominated	
Online Music Awards	2000	Björk	Favorite Tattooed Artist	Won	
Online Music Awards	2000	www.bjork.com	Best Official Site	Nominated	
Online Music Awards	2002	www.bjork.com	Best Artist Page	Nominated	
Online Music Awards	2004	www.bjork.com	Best International Artist Page	Won	
Order of the Falcon	1997	Björk	Knight's Cross	Honoree	
Ordre national du Mérite	2001	Björk	Chevalier	Honoree	
Phoenix Film Critics Society Awards	2001	"I've Seen It All"	Best Original Song	Nominated	
Polar Music Prize	2010	Björk	Polar Music Prize	Honoree	
Portuguese Music Awards	1998	Björk	Best International Artist	Won	
Portuguese Music Awards	1998	Björk	Best Female Singer	Won	
Q Awards	2005	Björk	Inspiration Award	Honoree	
Q Awards	2007	"Earth Intruders"	Best Video	Nominated	
Q Awards	2011	Björk	Greatest Act Of The Last 25 Years	Nominated	
Qwartz Electronic Music Awards	2007	Björk	Qwartz d'Honneur	Honoree	
Rockbjörnen	1995	Björk	Best International Female	Won	
Rober Awards Music Poll	2015	Björk	Best Female Artist	Won	
Rober Awards Music Poll	2015	Björk	Best Electronica	Won	
Rober Awards Music Poll	2015	Vulnicura	Album of the Year	Won	
Rober Awards Music Poll	2015	"Stonemilker"	Best Promo Video	Won	
Rober Awards Music Poll	2019	Björk	Best Live Artist	Nominated	
Robert Awards	2001	Björk (for Dancer in the Dark)	Best Actress in a Leading Role	Won	
Robert Awards	2001	Selmasongs	Best Score	Won	
Russian Guild of Film Critics Awards	2001	Björk (for Dancer in the Dark)	Best Foreign Actress	Won	
Satellite Awards	2001	Björk (for Dancer in the Dark)	Best Actress – Motion Picture Drama	Nominated	
Satellite Awards	2001	"I've Seen It All"	Best Original Song	Won	
Shortlist Music Prize	2002	Vespertine	Best Album	Nominated	
Signal Awards	2023	Björk: Sonic Symbolism	Most Innovative Audio Experience – Limited Series & Specials	Won	
Southeastern Film Critics Association Awards	2000	Björk (for Dancer in the Dark)	Best Actress	Nominated	
UK Music Video Awards (Note: At the 2013 ceremony, Andrew Thomas Huang won in the Best New Director category for his work on the "Mutual Core" video.)	2008	"Wanderlust"	Best Art Direction in a Video	Won	
UK Music Video Awards	2008	"Wanderlust"	Best Indie/Alternative Video	Won	
UK Music Video Awards	2008	"Wanderlust"	Best Visual Effects in a Video	Nominated	
UK Music Video Awards	2008	"Wanderlust"	Video of the Year	Won	
UK Music Video Awards	2013	"Mutual Core"	Best Visual Effects in a Video	Nominated	
UK Music Video Awards	2013	"Mutual Core"	Best Art Direction in a Video	Nominated	
UK Music Video Awards	2017	"Notget"	Best Interactive Video	Nominated	
UK Music Video Awards	2018	"The Gate"	Best Visual Effects in a Video	Nominated	
UK Music Video Awards	2018	"Utopia"	Best International Alternative Video	Nominated	
UK Music Video Awards	2018	"Arisen My Senses"	Best Production Design In a Video	Nominated	
UK Music Video Awards	2018	Björk	Best Artist	Nominated	
Iceland University of the Arts	2023	Björk	Honorary doctorate	Honoree	
Virgin Media Music Awards	2007	Björk	Best Live Act	Nominated	
VIVA Comet Awards	2001	Björk	Viewers' Choice Award	Nominated	
Webby Awards	2012	Björk	Webby Artist of the Year	Honoree	
Webby Awards	2013	"Mutual Core"	Online Film & Video — Music	Nominated	
Webby Awards	2013	"Mutual Core"	Online Film & Video — Music — People's Voice	Won	
Webby Awards	2023	Squarespace Icons 01: Björk	Social Video – Advertising, Media & PR	Won	
Webby Awards	2023	Fossora Website	Best Visual Design - Aesthetic – Websites and Mobile Sites	Nominated	
Webby Awards	2023	Björk: Sonic Symbolism	Best Partnerships or Collaboration – Podcasts	Nominated	
Žebřík Music Awards	1995	Björk	Best International Artist	Nominated	
Žebřík Music Awards	1996	Björk	Best International Female	Nominated	
Žebřík Music Awards	1997	Björk	Best International Female	Won	
Žebřík Music Awards	1997	Björk	Best International Personality	Nominated	
Žebřík Music Awards	1997	Björk	Best International Surprise	Nominated	
Žebřík Music Awards	1998	Björk	Best International Female	Nominated	
Žebřík Music Awards	1999	Björk	Best International Female	Nominated	
Žebřík Music Awards	2000	Björk	Best International Female	Nominated	
Žebřík Music Awards	2000	Björk	Best International Personality	Nominated	
Žebřík Music Awards	2001	Björk	Best International Personality	Nominated	
Žebřík Music Awards	2001	Björk	Best International Female	Won	
Žebřík Music Awards	2001	Vespertine	Best International Album	Nominated	
Žebřík Music Awards	2001	"Pagan Poetry"	Best International Video	Nominated	
Žebřík Music Awards	2002	Björk	Best International Female	Nominated	
Žebřík Music Awards	2003	Björk	Best International Female	Nominated	
Žebřík Music Awards	2004	Medúlla	Best International Album	Nominated	
Žebřík Music Awards	2004	"Oceania"	Best International Song	Nominated	
Žebřík Music Awards	2005	Björk	Best International Female	Nominated	
Žebřík Music Awards	2006	Björk	Best International Female	Nominated	
Žebřík Music Awards	2007	Björk	Best International Female	Nominated	
Žebřík Music Awards	2008	"Wanderlust"	Best International Video	Nominated	
