= All Is Full of Love =

1999 single by Björk

- UK CD1 and maxi-single CD cover

Single by Björk

from the album Homogenic
- Released: 24 May 1999
- Studio: El Cortijo (Málaga)
- Genre: Ambient (album version); trip hop (video version)
- Length: 4:32 (album version); 4:50 (video version); 4:10 (video edit)
- Label: One Little Indian; Elektra; Mother
- Songwriter: Björk
- Producers: Howie B (album version); Björk (video version)

Björk singles chronology
"Alarm Call" (1998)	"All Is Full of Love" (1999)	"Hidden Place" (2001)

Music video
- "All Is Full of Love" on YouTube

"All Is Full of Love" is a song by Icelandic musician Björk from her third studio album, Homogenic (1997). The lyrics were inspired by love in spring and Ragnarök of Norse mythology. Björk's original version is a trip hop ballad with soul influences, harp, strings, and electronic beats; the version on Homogenic is a minimalist ambient remix by Howie B, emphasising Björk's vocals. A remix by the German IDM duo Funkstörung was released as a single in 1998.

In 1999, "All Is Full of Love" was released as a single accompanied by a music video directed by Chris Cunningham. The video uses Björk's original mix and depicts Björk as a robot being assembled in a factory, who passionately kisses another robot. The video is often cited as one of the best of all time and a milestone in computer animation; it has been displayed in art exhibitions and was on display at the Museum of Modern Art in New York City. The single reached number 24 on the UK Singles Chart and became a dance hit in the United States. The original version of "All Is Full of Love" is the opening track on Greatest Hits (2002), whose tracks were voted for by fans. It has been covered by various artists.

== Background and composition ==
Album version
The album version "[builds] quietly from a warm hexadecimal hum" and "accrues momentum as Björk simultaneously frees herself from the burden of expectation until cascades of shimmering, opal-hued harpsichord notes emerge from a curtain of glimmering white noise".

Video version
The same fragment, but of the video track version. It features an "austere trip hop production" and richer instrumentation, differing from the ambience of Howie B's version.

"All Is Full of Love", the closing track of Homogenic, was the album's last song to be written and recorded. Produced by Björk, the original version of the song was replaced "at the last minute" with a remixed version by Howie B. It was inspired by the spring while producing the album in Málaga, Spain. After living in the mountains among other people for six months, Björk felt lonely, but a morning walk in April inspired her to write the track. She had a rough winter and then she realised it was spring after she could hear the birds singing. She wrote and recorded the song in half a day.

In keeping with Homogenic's theme as a tribute to Björk's native Iceland, the track was inspired by Icelandic mythology, such as the Ragnarök. The previous track, "Pluto", stands for death and destruction, whereas "All Is Full of Love" stands for a new beginning. Björk also called it a song about "believing in love" and expressed that "love isn't just about two persons. It's everywhere around you. Even if you're not getting love from Person A, it doesn't mean there's not love there." However, she also described it as "taking the piss", considering it the most "sugary song" ever. As the song opposes the rest of Homogenic's "macho" aesthetic, Björk has said it could have been included on Vespertine.

The lyrics begin with a promise of protection and caretaking: "You'll be given love / You'll be taken care of / You'll have to trust it". The song moves towards a more reproachful tone as Björk sings, "You just ain't receiving / Your phone is off the hook / Your doors are shut", tempered by the recognition that you have to "twist your head around you" because "love is all around you". This is musically effected by Björk's vocals as she sings the lyric "All is full of love" in counterpoint with herself.

The album version of the track does not have drum accompaniment. It does not have Homogenic's characteristic electronic beats, focusing instead on "[creating] an intimacy between the growing dynamics of the instrumentation and Björk's impressive vocal abilities." It uses a long reverb, which results in a wash of sound that suggests a very large space suggestive of the "heavenly" environment Björk envisaged for the track. According to Sal Cinquemani of Slant Magazine, the song has a soft pulse with intervals that build up to an electronic orchestration of industrial beats. David Browne of Entertainment Weekly called it a "moony lullaby" and compared it to the music of Enya. In his review for Spin, James Hunter wrote that the track is one of the times Björk "dips her toe into the warm lake of tradition" and noted its "rockish minor-key verses traipse off into her gospel."

The video version of the song is a midtempo trip hop ballad with soul influences. In opposition to the sonically minimalist mix included on the album, this version has been described as "lushly produced" and includes "fluttering" harps and "shivering" strings. Reportedly the best known and the preferred version by Björk's fans and herself, it is further known under the names of "Mark Stent Mix" and "Video Mix".

== Release ==
In August 1998, a 12-inch single of "All Is Full of Love", containing a remix by German IDM duo Funkstörung, was released through FatCat Records as a limited release. This remix had been previously distributed as a B-side for "Hunter" (1998), and another remix of the song had been released as a B-side of "Jóga" in 1998. In January 1999, it was announced that the track would be released later that year as a single and that its music video would be shot soon. It was atypical to release a single for promoting an album released two years before, but Björk purposely decided to do this so that the music video was more of a short film than a marketing move. The original release date for the single was 2 May 1999, but was later extended out two weeks to 17 May. To coincide with this announcement, Funkstörung's remix was made available again and an official logo for the release was unveiled.

The music video was released that April, although the premiere of the single was pushed back to 7 June 1999. "All Is Full of Love" was released as two 12-inch singles, two CD singles, a DVD single, and a box set, which included the CD singles and the music video in VHS format. Some publications regard the single as the first DVD single release. In the United Kingdom, it was also made available as two different promotional singles in 1999, and as two VHS singles. B-sides include remixes by μ-Ziq, Funkstörung, Plaid, Guy Sigsworth, Mark Stent and Howie B. The single's artwork consists of shots from the music video and features the official logo, which can be seen in the video as well. The song was also included as the opening track of Björk's 2002 compilation album Greatest Hits, whose songs were selected by fans through a survey, in which the single was the second most voted song, coming after "Hyperballad" (1996).

== Critical reception ==
Both versions of "All Is Full of Love" received acclaim from music critics. In a review for Homogenic, Phares from AllMusic described the track as a "reassuring finale". Sal Cinquemani of Slant Magazine called it a "sublime rebirth", and Tiny Mix Tapes commented that "the album ends on an optimistic note" with the "exquisite" song. In a retrospective review, Music Tech described the song as "hauntingly-beautiful". Entertainment Weekly's David Browne was less enthusiastic, considering it "the weakest track" of the album.

In a review for the DVD single, Alex Castle of IGN gave the music a score of 9 out of 10, writing "the thing sounds fantastic" and that the song is "pretty good". However, he admitted that he "would probably not have been particularly impressed" if he hadn't seen the music video. James Oldham of NME described it as "magnificent, sultry, pneumatic trip-soul ballad, which gently blooms into a magical garden of fluttering harps and shivering strings." He also added that the track "is no mere soundtrack" for the video. AllMusic's Heather Phares gave the DVD single four out of five stars, considering it "a necessary addition to the collections of dedicated Bjork fans". Douglas Wolk of CMJ New Music Monthly also gave the single a positive review, commending its B-sides and writing it "was hardly the most striking piece at the time—but the tune turns out to have been something of a sleeper."

=== Recognition ===
Blender included the track on two lists: "Standout Tracks from the 500 CDs You Must Own" and "The 1001 Greatest Songs to Download Right Now!", both published in 2003. The staff members of Slant Magazine placed "All Is Full of Love" at number 59 on their list of "The 100 Best Singles of the 1990s", writing: "Though it has been as oft-remixed as any other Björk single from the landmark Homogenic set, no version quite achieves the ethereal effect that the album mix of the song does. Coming off the tail-end of "Pluto," a sonic threnody for a suicidal fan, Björk's open-source, beat-free echo chamber is both absolution and resurrection". The track was also included on Quintessence Editions' 1001 Songs You Must Hear Before You Die as part of their "10,001 Songs You Must Hear" list.

== Music video ==
=== Background and development ===
The music video for "All Is Full of Love" was directed by Chris Cunningham. Björk was impressed by Cunningham's original music videos for IDM musicians Autechre, Squarepusher, and Aphex Twin, and by his clear lines, science fiction inclinations, and discordant imagery. This resulted in Björk contacting him to meet at his London office; she brought a Chinese Kama Sutra as a guide to what she wanted. Cunningham had also associated the track with sex upon hearing it, but could not figure out how to make the video explicit yet broadcastable. Björk said: "I think the only thing I said was that I thought it was very white [...] and I'm trying to describe some sort of a heaven. But I wanted also to have the other level there, there would be lust, it wouldn't be just clean." She complemented saying she mentioned that the video should be "white" and "frozen", and then it "melts because of love" and "making love".

Concept art by Chris Cunningham. Initially, the two protagonist robots would unfold like a flower as they mated, but the team could not manage to materialise this thought.

When Cunningham first heard the track, he wrote down the words "milk", "sexual", "surgery", and "white porcelain"; they outline what would become the music video. Concerning this, Cunningham added that it was like Kama Sutra meeting industrial robotics and that because of the surreal nature of the images, they could be "sexually suggestive" as they liked. Initially, it was planned that during the visual's ending, the robots would unfold like a flower as they mated, revealing an abstract life form made from the two artificial forms. However, the team could not manage to materialise this thought.

The robots were designed by Cunningham and were built in full-size by Paul Catling—who had also sculpted the masks for Aphex Twin's "Windowlicker" (1999)—in clay in two hours. He also worked with Julian Caldow in set design, which was created by Chris Oddy. The treatment described the set as an "elegant" and "white environment" with "a Japanese feel to it". However, the music video's director was dissatisfied with the result and relied heavily on post-production. On the shoot there were two main robot arms, but during its post production, a third and fourth robot arm were created in computer-generated imagery.

The video was shot at Bray Studios and Greenford Studios, and post-production was handled by Glassworks, using the software programs Softimage and Flame. Cunningham said that every shot in the clip had four layers. He reportedly first shot the set and the props doing nothing for about 21 seconds, and then removed the robot and replaced it with Björk, who had her face painted white and wore a blue suit. Using a mix of the master shot and a live feed of Björk in frame, the production team tried to match up her face and the robot body as much as possible. Only Björk's eyes and mouth were used, with the rest of the robot representing 3D animation traced from her real head. Cunningham has described the filming process as an unpleasant experience:

I always think that my strength is [...] sculpting stuff up in [post-production] and then, a lot of the time things are pretty ramshackle while they're shot. And I think that with the video that was the most extreme example of that, I mean it really was a disaster [...] In the Avid, looking at this stuff, it just looked awful and I actually had a panic attack when I went to the telecine to look at the rushes. I just thought "this is a fucking disaster, [...] so cheap and nasty. And it was only when Glassworks started doing the computer graphics that [...] I started to realise how the video was gonna be made completely with the computer graphic addition."

Björk left Cunningham alone to work on the video, refusing to see the product until it was finished, explaining that "when you come across someone as special as Chris [...] you just go humble", which Cunningham said made the work much easier.

=== Synopsis ===
In the music video's climax, the two robots passionately kiss, contrasting with the ethereal sterility of the room and the rendered movements of the machines.

The video begins with a journey through a dark environment wrought with cables and a faint pulsating light. The sequence has been described as "womb-like, voyeuristic, as if the black box of technology is about to open up". The camera follows these cables to an ethereal, white room where a robot with Björk's features lies in a fetal position. As the room becomes illuminated by fluorescent lights flickering on, two mechanical arms begin to assemble the robot, which opens its eyes and begins to sing the song. Pistons pumping white fluids, as well as drilling and penetrative motions are seen, featuring a "clear" sexual subtext.

Now sitting upright, the robot looks up to see another robotic Björk as the machines stop the assembly. It smiles and extends its hand to the sitting robot, joining in the song. In the climax of the video, the robots passionately kiss and embrace while the machines assemble their backs and light comes and goes. The images of the kissing robots are interposed with shots of white fluid washing over robotic parts and the mechanical arms assembling them. According to the Institute for the Unstable Media, "as the music fades and the pulsating beat becomes more dominant, we are once again drawn in the womb-like dark space, making it clear to us that we sampled a glimpse of a black-boxed kingdom".

=== Reception ===
The music video was greeted with widespread critical acclaim. Music journalist Mark Pytlik wrote the visual "marked an unquestionable creative apex for Björk's visual work, a perfect synthesis of form and content". IGN gave the video a score of 9/10, writing it is an "utterly gorgeous sight to behold" and "just about perfect". Time's Craig Duff called it a milestone in computer animation and stated that "no robot had expressed the sensuality that director Chris Cunningham imbues in a Björk-bot in the video". MusicRadar considered the music video to be "one of the most visually striking promos of Björk's career." NME also praised the "All Is Full of Love" clip as one of Björk's best, and particularly commended the wide angle shot of the cyborgs kissing as the chorus kicks in.

Eric Henderson of Slant Magazine dubbed it "the perfect pre-millennial precursor to our current gadget-assisted culture of self-love" and also wrote, "When it was released, I thought it looked cool and stressed the importance of loving yourself. Now I think it's a terrifying and sealed-off nightmare wherein you find out that you are the only person who will ever love you." Writing for Pitchfork Media, Scott Plagenhoef considered that "the strongest single images from any video of the 1990s come from [the clip]", also calling it "strange and moving". CMJ New Music Monthly's Douglas Wolk called the video "magnificent" and praised it for "[bringing] out the beauty of the song".

=== Recognition and legacy ===
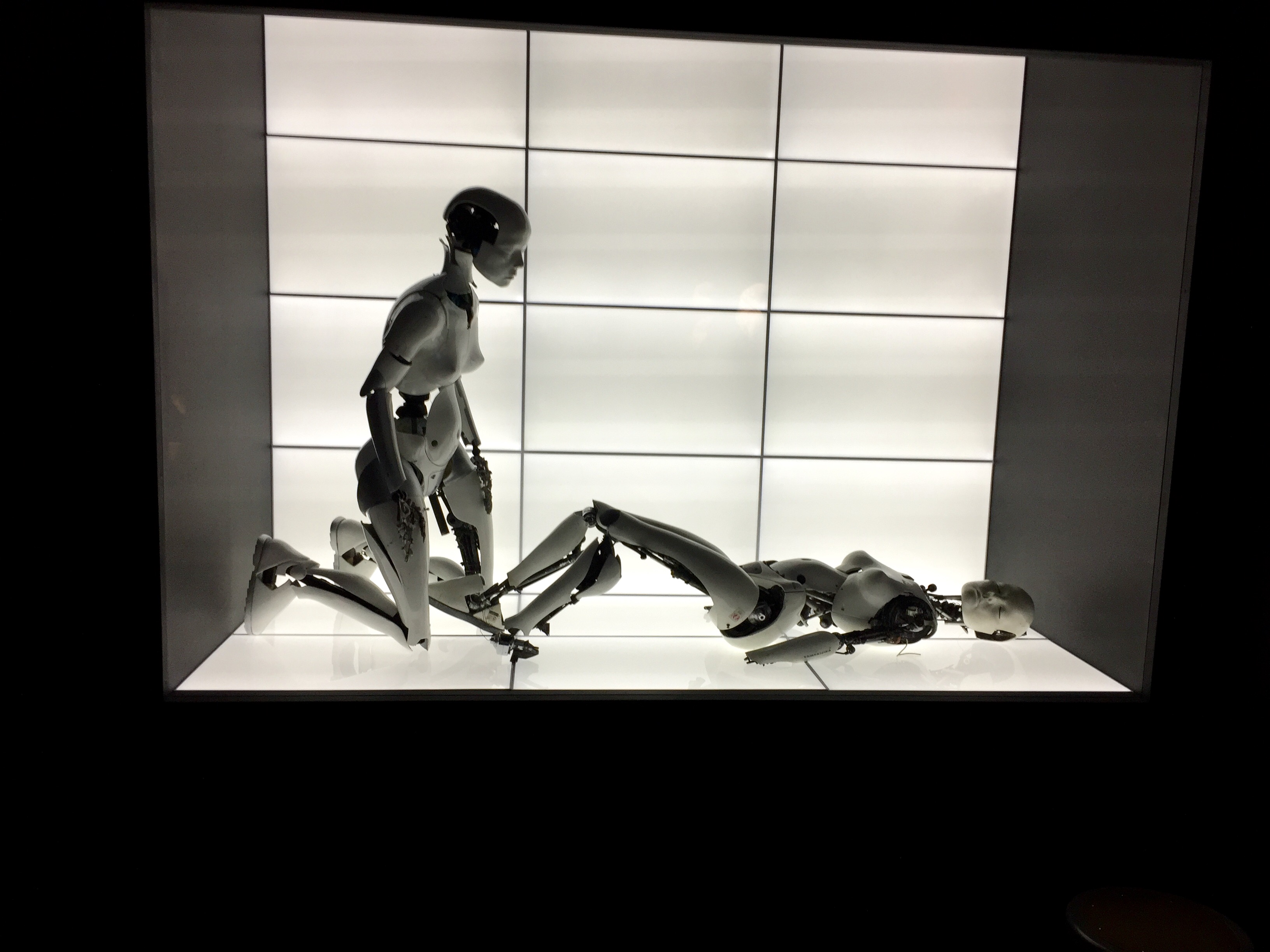
Replicas of the music video's robots on the Björk retrospective at MoMA, New York City.

The music video has won various awards and accolades. It won the Jury Prize at ArtFutura Festival of 1999, Best Video in the 2000 Fantasporto, Best Video at the 2000 Australian Effects and Animation Festival and Best Art Direction in a Video and Best Special Effects in a Video at the Music Week Awards. Other awards received at festivals include the second place of the Prix PIXEL-INA Best Script in the 2000 Imagina, and the music video award at the London Effects and Animation Festival. At the D&AD Awards, the video was awarded prizes in Video Direction, Cinematography, Animation, and Special Effects. Furthermore, at the MVPA Awards, Cunningham received the award for Best Direction of a Female Artist in a Music Video. Björk won two awards at the MTV Video Music Awards in 2000: Breakthrough Video and Best Special Effects in a Video. The music video also received the Best Special Effects in a Music Video and Best 3D Animation Music Video during the 2000 International Monitor Awards. Particularly, the visual won various nominations: Best Video at the 1999 Ericcson Muzik Awards, Best Short Form Music Video at the 42nd Annual Grammy Awards, and Best Alternative Video, Best Cinematography, and Best Editing in a Video at the 2000 Music Week Awards.

In 2008, MTV2 ranked the music video as number one on their list "Greatest Music Videos Ever". In 2011, "All Is Full of Love" was placed at number 14 in MusicRadar's list of the 30 best music videos of all time, and was placed in Time's list of The 30 All-TIME Best Music Videos. The video was also listed as the fifth-greatest of all time by NME, and the ninth top music video of the decade by Pitchfork Media. In addition, "All Is Full of Love" has been included in various art exhibitions and museums, including DEAF04 Exhibition in the V2 Institute for the Unstable Media in Rotterdam, Chris Cunningham in MoMA PS1 in New York City, the 49th Venice Biennale, While Interwoven Echoes Drip into a Hybrid Body – an Exhibition about Sound, Performance and Sculpture in the Migros Museum für Gegenwartskunst in Zürich, and This Is Not a Love Song in La Virreina Centre de la Imatge in Barcelona. The music video was also on permanent exhibition at the Museum of Modern Art in New York City.

Chris Cunningham served as a model for a character in the novel Pattern Recognition (2003) by William Gibson, in which a fictitious music video director who puts "robot girls in his video" makes a clip characterised by the following words: "No sci-fi kitsch for Damien. Dreamlike things in the dawn half-light, their small breasts gleaming, white plastic shining faint as old marble", as a reference to "All Is Full of Love". In 2004, similarities were noted between the design of the robots in the music video and those in the film I, Robot, raising accusations of plagiarism by fans. E! News contacted Cunningham and 20th Century Fox—the studio behind the film—but neither of them returned calls for comment. According to Tymon Smith of The Times, 2015 American film Chappie "ends with a rip off" of the music video. It also was an inspiration for the opening title sequence of the television series Westworld.

== Live performances ==
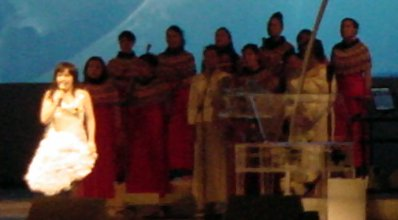
Björk performing at Radio City Music Hall during her Vespertine world tour in 2001

Björk first performed "All Is Full of Love" live in July 1997, playing the whole album for a press conference and presentation concert concerning Homogenic at the Old Truman Building, an old beer factory in London, wearing a pink dress designed by Hussein Chalayan, which she would later sport in the video for "Bachelorette" (1997) and photoshoots. The song was part of the set list for her Homogenic tour, on which Björk embarked with Mark Bell and Icelandic String Octet from late 1997 to early 1999. "All Is Full of Love" was also performed during the Vespertine world tour in 2001, which featured Vespertine collaborators Matmos and Zeena Parkins, an Inuit choir, and an orchestra. During the tour, Björk performed in concert halls and opera houses in order to "have the best acoustics possible" and avoid the "appalling acoustics" of stadiums and rock venues. The track was the most performed of the tour, alongside "Frosti" and "Pagan Poetry". Björk's concert at the Royal Opera House of 16 December 2001, which included a performance of the song, was broadcast on BBC Four and released as the DVD Live at Royal Opera House in 2002. A live version of the track can also be found on the tour documentary DVD Minuscule of 2003. A Vespertine tour live version of the song was released through Vespertine Live, a live album of the tour included in the box set Live Box (2003).

The headliner of the 2002 Coachella Valley Music and Arts Festival, Björk opened the set with the track, wearing a white Comme des Garçons dress. This performance was included on the 2006 video documentary Coachella. The song was also part of the set list of the Greatest Hits tour (2003), which once again featured the Icelandic String Octet, but with the addition of Vespertine world tour collaborators Matmos and Zeena Parkins. It was one of the most played songs of the tour. Björk's performance of the song in New York City during the tour was included in the 2005 documentary film Screaming Masterpiece. "All Is Full of Love" was also performed during the Volta tour (2007–08), a tour she undertook with Mark Bell, Jónas Sen, Damian Taylor, Chris Corsano, and a 10-piece female brass band. Several of the concerts were part of festivals, including Coachella, Glastonbury, and Rock en Seine, among others. A live performance of the track during the tour was included in the box set Voltaïc (2009), specifically the CD Songs from the Volta Tour Performed Live at the Olympic Studios. The track was also performed a few times during Björk's Biophilia tour (2011–13). The song was performed only once on the 2015 Vulnicura tour.

== Cover versions ==
In 2001, American indie rock band the Microphones covered "All Is Full of Love" for their 2001 studio album, Blood. It was also covered by Death Cab for Cutie and was released on their 2002 The Stability EP. The Vitamin String Quartet, a musical group known for its tributes to popular music acts, covered the track as part of their 2005 tribute to Björk Violently: The String Quartet Tribute To Bjork. In 2022, Rosie Thomas covered "All Is Full of Love" with guest vocalists including Sufjan Stevens and the Shins.

== Track listings ==
=== 1998 ===
- UK CD
1. Björk mit Funkstörung – "All Is Full of Love (In Love With Funkstörung Mix)" – 5:29
2. Funkstörung – "This Shit" – 5:01
3. Björk mit Funkstörung – "All Is Full of Love (Secondotted by Funkstörung)" – 4:37

The 12-inch vinyl version of the single only featured the first two tracks. The "Secondotted by Funkstörung" mix was included on the 1999 single as the "Funkstörung Exclusive Mix".

=== 1999 ===
- European CD
1. "All Is Full of Love" (Radio mix) – 4:50
2. "All Is Full of Love" (Radio Strings Mix) – 4:46
3. "All Is Full of Love" (Guy Sigsworth mix) – 4:22
4. "All Is Full of Love" (Funkstörung Exclusive mix) – 4:36
5. "All Is Full of Love" (Plaid mix) – 4:15
- US CD
1. "All Is Full of Love" (video version) – 4:50
2. "All Is Full of Love" (Funkstörung Exclusive mix) – 4:36
3. "All Is Full of Love" (Strings) – 4:46
4. "All Is Full of Love" (album version) – 4:32
5. "All Is Full of Love" (Plaid mix) – 4:15
6. "All Is Full of Love" (Guy Sigsworth mix) – 4:22
- UK CD1
1. "All Is Full of Love" – 4:50
2. "All Is Full of Love" (Funkstörung Exclusive mix) – 4:36
3. "All Is Full of Love" (Strings) – 4:46
- UK CD2
1. "All Is Full of Love" (Album version) – 4:32
2. "All Is Full of Love" (Plaid mix) – 4:15
3. "All Is Full of Love" (Guy Sigsworth mix) – 4:22
- UK DVD
1. "All Is Full of Love" (Video) – 4:50
2. "All Is Full of Love" (Funkstörung Exclusive mix) (audio) – 4:36
3. "All Is Full of Love" (Strings) (audio) – 4:46
- 12-inch vinyl 1
1. "All Is Full of Love" (μ-ziq 7 minute mix) – 3:51
2. "All Is Full of Love" (μ-ziq 1 minute mix) – 1:05
3. "All Is Full of Love" (Funkstörung Exclusive mix) – 4:36
- 12-inch vinyl 2
1. "All Is Full of Love" (Plaid remix) – 4:15
2. "All Is Full of Love" (Guy Sigsworth mix) – 4:22

== Credits and personnel ==
Credits adapted from the liner notes of Homogenic and the single's physical release.

- Written by Björk
- Production – Howie B (album version) – Björk (video version)
- Mixing engineer – Howie B (album version) – Björk, Mark Stent (video version)
- Assistants – Rebecca Storey, Russell Polden, Paul "P-Dub" Walton, Jason Westbrook, Danny Brown, Kirsten Cowie, Sie Midway-Smith, James Loughrey, Rob Murphy and Jason Groucott
- Keyboards – Björk, Mark Bell and Guy Sigsworth
- Programming – Mark Bell and Markus Dravs
- Electronic drumkit – Trevor Morais
- Clavichord and pipe organ – Guy Sigsworth
- Accordion – Yasuhiro "Coba" Kobayashi
- Glass harmonica – Alasdair Malloy
- Published by Polygram Music Publishing Ltd

== Charts ==
Weekly chart performance for "All Is Full of Love"
Chart (1999)	Peak position
European Hot 100 Singles (Music & Media)	89
Scottish Singles Sales (Official Charts)	36
UK Singles (Official Charts)	24
UK Indie (Official Charts)	3
US Dance/Electronic Singles Sales (Billboard)	8

== Release history ==
Release dates and formats for "All Is Full of Love"
Region	Date	Format(s)	Label(s)	Ref.
United Kingdom	24 May 1999	Dance radio	One Little Indian	
France	31 May 1999	DVD	Barclay; Mother	
United Kingdom	7 June 1999	CD (1); CD (2); DVD; 12-inch (1); 12-inch (2)	One Little Indian	
United Kingdom	5 July 1999	Box set	One Little Indian	
United States	12 October 1999	DVD; maxi CD	Elektra	

== Bibliography ==
- Pytlik, Mark (2003). Björk: Wow and Flutter. ECW Press. ISBN 1-55022-556-1.
