= Hunter (Björk song) =

- UK CD1 cover

Single by Björk

from the album Homogenic
- B-side: "All Is Full of Love"; "So Broken"; "Alarm Call"
- Released: 3 June 1998
- Recorded: 1997
- Studio: El Cortijo (Marbella)
- Genre: Electronica; trip hop; baroque pop
- Length: 4:12 (album version); 3:29 (radio edit)
- Label: One Little Indian
- Songwriter: Björk
- Producers: Björk; Mark Bell

Björk singles chronology
"Bachelorette" (1997)	"Hunter" (1998)	"Alarm Call" (1998)

Music video
- "Hunter" on YouTube

"Hunter" is a song recorded by Icelandic singer Björk for her third studio album Homogenic (1997). The lyrics explore the pressure Björk felt to write music after realising the workforce that depended on her, following the success she found as a solo artist with her previous studio albums.

Björk first performed "Hunter" at the 1997 Tibetan Freedom Concert and included it with the online promotional release of Homogenic. It was released as the third single from the album as three different CD releases in the United Kingdom in October 1998, having been released in France four months prior. A collaborative effort between Björk and Mark Bell, "Hunter" features a dark combination of strings and layered synths, a militaristic electronic beat, and enigmatic lyrics about a mission.

"Hunter" received positive reviews and was named one of the highlights of Homogenic. However, the single charted poorly, peaking reached 44 on the UK singles chart and number 55 in France. "Hunter" was included on Björk's greatest hits album Greatest Hits (2002), whose tracks were selected by fans through an online survey.

The accompanying music video for "Hunter" was directed by longtime collaborator Paul White of Me Company and consists of a close-up of a bald Björk as she transforms into a "techno-bear" while singing. Seeking to convey the music's fusion of organic and technological, the polar bear was animated in a non-naturalistic fashion; the bear also embodies the ferocious hunter the lyrics represent. The song's video garnered acclaim from critics. Björk has performed "Hunter" on Later... with Jools Holland and on five of her tours, the most recent being the Vulnicura tour.

== Music and lyrics ==
The opening track of Homogenic, "Hunter" showcases the hybrid elements of strings and electronic backing beats through the album. It blends the live sound of the Icelandic String Octet —orchestrated by Eumir Deodato—, Yasuhiro Kobayashi's accordion and "stuttering computer beats and beeps" programmed by Mark Bell. Music journalist Evelyn McDonnell wrote "the production showed Björk's steeping in the cutting edge of electronic dance-music culture, her embrace of techno futurism, her time spent pulling all-nighters in London clubs. But the emotion was ancient, deeply human". The song has been described as "dark", "uncompromising" and "icy". According to Ray Gun, "Hunter" evokes an eerie terrain with rolling techno beats and strings penetrating the air like a toxic fog. Björk's vocals have been much celebrated in the track. They have been described as what "[ties] the whole shebang together together [...]: full of reverberating menace and trepidation on the verses, then bursting into full-throated confession, layers of her voice pitching next to each other then cascading together". The Wire wrote that Björk's voice "oscillates between steely-edged determination and uncontained freedom".

Björk incorporated elements of traditional Icelandic culture. She uses the interval of the fifth throughout the song, such as in the cellos; fifths were common in Icelandic folk songs. Elements of Maurice Ravel's Boléro were also noted. René T. A. Lysloff and Leslie C. Gay, Jr. wrote: "One of the three main sections of the whole song is the Bolero ostinato (0:00-1:36). The sounds Björk uses to cover the rhythmic patterns from Bolero are tightly interwoven." The "militaristic" percussion was programmed on a Roland TR-909 drum machine by Bell. Björk recorded the vocals, bassline and chord structure before Bell met her in Spain. After she explained how she wanted the percussion to sound, Bell recorded one take. Engineer Markus Dravs said: "We all had a go on the filtering and played around with the decay of each individual drum."

Björk sings: "If travel is searching / And home has been found / I'm not stopping / I'm going hunting". Sal Cinquemani of Slant Magazine noted self-mockery of "her own idyllic disposition" in the lyrics "I thought I could organize freedom / How Scandinavian of me!" That line was covered in various reviews; it has been described as "hilarious" and "derisively" delivered. When asked about the meaning of those lines, Björk replied:

in Iceland, the people from Sweden, we think they're really not cool at all and they just have got no sense of humour, are really organized. And you can't organize everything. So I think in that song, I was sort of... thinking that I could even organize freedom, just like very stupid. Quite Scandinavian, you know.

Some critics interpreted the line as an allusion to a failed relationship. Björk said: "'Hunter' is based on what my grandma told me at Christmas; about two different types of birds. One bird always had the same nest and partner all their lives. The other was always travelling and taking on different partners. At some point there was a conscious decision made to remain a hunter." According to Björk, the lyrics express how she felt obliged to produce music because of the people that occupationally depended of her. The lyrics "I'll bring back the goods/But don't know when" refer to her songwriting process; in her own words: "Sometimes I don't do things that people I work with do —like spend time with families and lead a normal life. I have to isolate myself and put myself in a state so I will write a song." After the success of her albums Debut (1993) and Post (1995), Björk felt pressure as she noticed how her creative output affected the life of those around her. In an interview with Dave Hemingway, she said:

I guess that song's about when you have a lot of people that work for you and you sort-of have to write songs or people get unemployed, you know? In most cases, it's inspiring but in that particular song I was pissed off with it. I was ready for a break but it didn't seem fair on the people I worked with at the time.

== Release ==
"Hunter" was first made available for streaming prior to the release of Homogenic. In early 1998, it was announced that "Alarm Call" would be released as the third single off the album, followed by "Hunter". By March, no release dates had been specified, although the production of the music video was announced. In April, plans for "Alarm Call" as the third single were suspended and "Hunter" was chosen instead. It was first released in France on 3 June. The release date of "Hunter" was confirmed to be 5 October in September. There were three different CD releases of "Hunter" in the United Kingdom, which were subsequently released via a box set in early 1999. "Hunter" was also included on Björk's greatest hits album Greatest Hits (2002), whose track list was determined by fans through an online survey.

== Critical reception ==
"Hunter" garnered acclaim from music critics, who complimented its elaborate production, its haunting melody and cryptic lyrics. Marvin Lin from Tiny Mix Tapes called it "painfully beautiful". Jack Dickey of Deadspin considered "Hunter" one of the only two songs in the album where "the instruments win out" and wrote it "is like Peter and the Wolf if, instead of a merciful hunter, Artemis were chasing the wolf." In a review for the single release, Keir Langley of AllMusic praised the rhythm and intensity of the track as a showcase of her collaboration with Mark Bell. The Wire's Louise Gray thought it was an "extraordinary, mesmeric song." Evelyn McDonnell wrote "I myself had used the prevalent critical category for Björk uncategorizable amalgalm of styles: 'quirky.' There was nothing quirky about 'Hunter.'" She also praised the song's originality and appeal to various types of listeners. Phil Freeman included "Hunter" in his list of songs which "say something important about the state of music since 1979—how venerable forms have changed;" inspired by Greil Marcus' attempt to define rock and roll in Stranded (1978). He wrote "her voice is protean and capable of astonishingly raw, forceful outbursts, but it's when she holds it in, on tracks like this one, that her real power emerges." Authors Shirley R. Steinberg and Donaldo Pereira Macedo identified elements of Donna Haraway's A Cyborg Manifesto in "Hunter". They state that, by assuming the position of authority in relation to the masculine other, Björk challenges the traditional notions of femininity; and that by "[leaving] to be the hunter," she "disrupts the nature/culture binary of which Haraway speaks."

== Music video ==
=== Development ===
For the Hunter video we wanted something different - something fun. Because by the time Homogenic came around, she'd already been everywhere and done everything, artistically speaking. She'd gone so far over the top that we felt a minimalistic approach would be more challenging for both of us. And for me, the post-production was much more of a challenge because it took several months, whereas she wrapped up after a single day of shooting.
—Director Paul White about the making of the video.

The music video for "Hunter" was directed by longtime collaborator Paul White from Me Company, the design firm that produced the artwork of Homogenic and Post, and their respective singles. Computer animation was handled by Digital Domain. The live-action portion of the video was shot in London in 12 takes, with Björk performing in front of a green screen; she wore makeup to simulate baldness and tracking markers were applied to her head and face for subsequent computer graphics work. A second performance was later shot with the singer's face marked up with infrared dots as a reference for animators to create convincing facial contortions, and a paper clay polar bear head was scanned next to Björk's head for modeling guidelines.

Both Alistair Beattie, producer and member of Me Company, and Björk used the word "techno" to refer to the design of the polar bear. To coincide with the song's fusion of organic and technological, it was deliberately designed in a non-photorealist manner. In an interview for I.D. magazine in November 1997, Beattie said:

Transformative products are exciting, but robo-pets are even more exciting. We were interested in making the technology very visible, but also playing with translucency and transparency, soft boundaries. The irony of the digital age is that, as technology gets more invisible, people are more interested in being able to see it again, as in Apple Computer's iMac, with its translucent blues and milky plastics that simultaneously tease and reveal.

Post-production took place in California, where Digital Domain received all data. Using Autodesk Softimage and proprietary software, they tracked Björk's movements from the two marker sets and then began key frame animation using Autodesk Maya, Autodesk Alias and Autodesk Softimage. By combining patch deformation and shape interpolation, the emerging bear head was created, composed of "100 maneuverable platelets that rise up through the skin." Finally, rendering was completed using Pixar's RenderMan, a holographic shader was used to make the bear skin colors change, and all the computer graphics were added to the live-action footage. According to The Wire, post-production work brought the costs of the video up to £250,000.

=== Synopsis ===
Björk transforming into a polar bear in the music video of "Hunter".

The video begins with a white screen followed by a fade-in of a close-up of a bald Björk. She passionately sings looking into the camera; as she shakes and moves her head, she begins to morph into a polar bear. Towards the end of the video, she completely transforms into the "techno-bear", before returning to her original state and the image once again fading-out to white.

=== Reception and analysis ===
The video received critical acclaim. Freeze Frame deemed the video "primal" and complimented Björk on keeping the attention of the viewer by only showing her head and shoulders, thus comparing it to "Sledgehammer" by Peter Gabriel. I.D. Magazine praised its special effects, writing they "reach a new level of detail in [the music video]" and compared the singer's transformation to that of the title character in Robert Louis Stevenson's Strange Case of Dr Jekyll and Mr Hyde. Louise Gray of The Wire described the music video as "extraordinary" and "deeply affecting". Cultural theorist Dominic Pettman, while analyzing the "becoming-animal" theorized by Deleuze and Guattari, found that the video for "Hunter" —along with the character Treadwell in Herzog's Grizzly Man— embodied various points these philosophers studied regarding that concept. Shirley R. Steinberg and Donaldo Pereira Macedo wrote that in the music video, Donna Haraway's metaphor of A Cyborg Manifesto appears in "Björks embodiment of a human-animal-machine hybrid."

Evelyn McDonnell has identified bears and hunters as recurring themes in Björk's videos. The bear was used as a "literal symbol of strength, ferocity, self-determination and the North, a pioneering roaming spirit." Beattie has stated that as the song is about the two different states of the hunter and the gatherer, "the polar bear is the perfect symbol of the hunter state, it polarizes (ahem!) [sic] the difference between the two into something really extreme and magical." When asked why the video is "so stark", Beattie compared it to kōans and haikus in the sense that "it tries to ask the question in the most interesting manner possible," and added that "[they] wanted the effects to be done right in front of your eyes" so that "the magic and illusion are all the more powerful." About the concept behind the video, White said:

This video features Björk morphing into a polar bear - and proves that she's willing to do anything to push herself artistically. And the beauty of Hunter is its utter simplicity. It's about a woman who allows the animal within to take over when necessary. The provider - in a cold world. It's amazing that after all these years people still don't understand it. Mission accomplished.

In an interview with The Wire, Björk said that the video "[is] about the argument between hunting experiences and stopping and settling." She has also stated to Interview that she identifies with polar bears because "they're very cuddly and cute and quite calm, but if they meet you they can be very strong." Freeze Frame wrote:

She's is the hunter-gather [sic] that we evolved from, still with us and still a part of us. It's about shedding the denial and embracing what we are - what we really are, even thought it's sometimes hard to tell. The Wire wrote the video "also tackles shape-changing, the idea of transmogrification that is the core of shamanic power."

=== Recognition ===
"Hunter" was the runner-up for the Prix PIXEL-INA Vidéoclip at the 1999 Imagina festival. At the 2000 Fantasporto film festival of Porto, Portugal, Björk received the Audience Choice award for the music video.

== Live performances ==
Björk presented the song —and three more songs off the then-unreleased Homogenic— at the Tibetan Freedom Concert on 6 June 1997, as a sneak peek of the album. She performed with Mark Bell, who was raised at the rear of the stage surrounded by keyboards and sequencers, and with the Icelandic String Octet conducted by Eumir Deodato at one side of the stage. She wore a pink dress designed by Hussein Chalayan, which she would later wear in the video for "Bachelorette" and photoshoots. That July, Björk performed the whole album for a press conference and presentation concert regarding Homogenic at the Old Truman Building, an old beer factory in London, wearing the same outfit. During the brief Homogenic promotional tour, which took place from 31 August to 10 September 1997, "Hunter" was the opening track of the set. Björk also performed the track with the Icelandic String Octet and Mark Bell on the British TV show Later... with Jools Holland, a performance that was included in the 2003 DVD release of the same name.

The song was part of the set list of the Homogenic tour which Björk embarked with Mark Bell and the Icelandic String Octet from late 1997 to early 1999. A performance of "Hunter" at the Cambridge Corn Exchange during the tour was included in the video release Live in Cambridge (2001). Björk's June 1998 performance of the song in Paris was released in Homogenic Live, a live album of the tour included in the box set Live Box (2003). "Hunter" was also performed —usually as the opening track— during the Greatest Hits tour of 2003, which once again featured the Icelandic String Octet, but with the addition of Vespertine world tour collaborators Matmos and Zeena Parkins.

"Hunter" was also performed during the Volta tour (2007–08), a tour she undertook with Mark Bell, Jónas Sen, Damian Taylor, Chris Corsano and a 10 piece female brass band. Several of the concerts were part of festivals, including Coachella, Glastonbury and Rock en Seine, among others. Live performances of "Hunter" during the tour were included in the box set Voltaïc (2009), specifically the CD Songs from the Volta Tour Performed Live at the Olympic Studios and the DVD The Volta Tour ("Live in Paris"). The track was also part of the set list of Björk's latest tour, the Biophilia tour (2011–13), whose schedule featured both a residency format and a conventional stage format for the festival dates. "Hunter" was performed mainly at festival dates and outdoor facilities.

== Covers ==
=== Thirty Seconds to Mars version ===
In 2005, American rock band Thirty Seconds to Mars covered "Hunter" and placed it as a bonus track on their second studio album, A Beautiful Lie. The song was not originally a part of the album, but was recorded and added to the track listing after the album leaked several months before it was to be released. It changes the word "Scandinavian" for "American" in the line "I thought I could organize freedom/How Scandinavian of me!", and the line "You just didn't know me" was added towards the end of the song. Brian Orloff from the Tampa Bay Times was impressed with the cover version, writing that Thirty Seconds to Mars erects "riveting tension" in its "almost trip-hop" rendition of the song. Rock Sound magazine also responded positively to the track and described it as "an absinthe-soaked techno rendering." Kaj Roth from Melodic felt that the band "really caught the spirit" of the song; however, Kirsty Krampf of DIY thought it was "a criminal re-hash."

=== Terminator: Dark Fate soundtrack version ===
A version of the song was produced for the 2019 film Terminator: Dark Fate by an artist named Riaya, featuring John Mark McMillan on vocals.

== Track listings and formats ==
- Digital single 1 / UK and French CD1
1. "Hunter" (Radio Edit) – 3:29
2. "All Is Full of Love" (In Love with: Funkstörung Remix) – 5:23
3. "Hunter" (μ-Ziq Remix) – 7:00
- Digital single 2 / UK CD2
1. "Hunter" (Album Version) – 4:12
2. "Hunter" (State of Bengal Mix) – 7:40
3. "Hunter" (Skothùs Mix) – 9:11
- *Recorded at Shepherd's Bush Empire, 13 November 1997.
- Digital single 3 / UK CD3
1. "Hunter" (Mood Swing Remix) – 3:03
2. "So Broken" (DJ Krust Mix) – 8:13
3. "Hunter" (Live)* – 4:28
- French CD2
1. "Hunter" – 4:12
2. "Alarm Call" (Bjeck Mix) – 6:30
3. "Hunter" (Skothùs Mix) – 9:11

== Credits and personnel ==
Credits adapted from Homogenic liner notes.

- Björk – vocals, writer, production, keyboards
- Mark Bell - production, keyboards, programming, drum programming
- Markus Dravs - recording, programming, drum programming
- Mark "Spike" Stent - mixing
- Guy Sigsworth - keyboards, programming, clavichord, pipe organ
- Richard Brown - programming
- Marius De Vries - programming
- Howie B - programming
- Trevor Morais - electronic drumkit
- Yasuhiro "Coba" Kobayashi - accordion
- Alasdair Malloy - glass harmonica
- Eumir Deodato - transcription, orchestration and arrangement
- The Icelandic String Octet - string players

== Charts ==
Weekly chart performance for "Hunter"
Chart (1998)	Peak position
France (SNEP)	55
UK Singles (Official Charts)	44
UK Indie (Official Charts)	7

== Release history ==
Release dates and formats for "Hunter"
Region	Date	Format(s)	Label(s)	Ref.
France	3 June 1998	Two maxi CDs	Barclay; Mother	
United Kingdom	5 October 1998	Three maxi CDs	One Little Indian	
United Kingdom	18 January 1999	Box set	One Little Indian	

== Bibliography ==
- Freeman, Phil (2007). Marooned: The Next Generation of Desert Island Discs. Da Capo Press. p. 285. ISBN 978-0-306-81485-3. "björk hunter."
- Lysloff, René T. A.; Gay, Leslie C. Jr. (2003). Music and Technoculture. Wesleyan University Press. pp. 194–195. ISBN 978-0-8195-6514-3.
- Pereira Macedo, Donaldo; Steinberg, Shirley R. (2007). Media literacy: a reader. Peter Lang. ISBN 978-0-8204-8668-0.
- Pytlik, Mark (2003). Bjork: Wow and Flutter. ECW Press. pp. 180–181. ISBN 978-1-55022-556-3.
