= Alarm Call =

1998 single by Björk

- UK CD1 cover

Single by Björk

from the album Homogenic
- B-side: "All Is Full of Love"; "So Broken"; "Hunter"
- Released: 30 November 1998
- Studio: El Cortijo (Marbella)
- Genre: Dance-pop
- Length: 4:25 (album version); 3:38 (radio edit); 3:44 (video version)
- Label: One Little Indian
- Songwriter: Björk
- Producers: Björk; Mark Bell

Björk singles chronology
| "Hunter" (1998) | "Alarm Call" (1998) | "All Is Full of Love" (1999) |

Music video
- "Alarm Call" on YouTube

"Alarm Call" is a song recorded by Icelandic singer Björk for her third studio album Homogenic (1997). It was released as the fourth single from the album, peaking at number 33 in the United Kingdom. The sped-up radio edit of the song was used in the 1999 film The Mod Squad.

== Background ==
The song, originally labelled "Jacko" on the Homogenic demo tape, speaks of reawakening through music. Björk explained: "I think that music has the power to change the things, and that's what I wanted to show on Alarm Call". It is the only single from Homogenic that was not included on Greatest Hits.

== Music video ==
Björk in the jungle in the "Alarm Call" music video

The first music video for "Alarm Call" was directed by Paul White from Me Company, the design firm that produced the artwork of Homogenic, Debut and Post, and their respective singles, and it featured Björk in a similar dress to the one featured on the Homogenic album cover along with a dance scene in the Los Angeles subway system.

However, Björk was not pleased with the result and a second video was directed by fashion designer Alexander McQueen and filmed in October 1998, over a two-day period in London. She told MTV News that she felt that the music video industry needed a "spank on the bum", and that McQueen was the man to do the video.

"I haven't seen many fashion shows in my life, but you go to his shows and you come out feeling like anything is possible"; she went on to describe McQueen as a "guy with a powerful and fluid mind who could direct films, build castles, and write music". He wrote up a nearly one-hundred-page treatment of his ideas for the video.

It features Björk floating on a raft on a river in the jungle and her scenes are intercut with footage of snakes, crocodiles, and other animals, with Björk playing with them. The version of the song used in the video is the radio mix by Andy Bradfield and Mark Bell.

== Track listings and formats ==
- UK 12-inch single 1
1. "Alarm Call" (Bjeck Mix) – 6:25
2. "Alarm Call" (Rhythmic Phonetics Mix)* – 5:18
3. "Alarm Call" (Speech Therapy Mix)* – 6:04
- UK 12-inch single 2
1. "Alarm Call" (Enough Is Enough Mix)** – 3:37
2. "Alarm Call" (Rise and Shine Mix)** – 2:25
3. "All Is Full of Love" (All Is Full of Lies Mix)** – 3:25
- UK 12-inch single 3
1. "Alarm Call" (Reprosession Mix) – 7:45
2. "So Broken" (DJ Krust Mix) – 8:13
- UK 12-inch single 4
1. "Alarm Call" (Alan Braxe & Ben Diamond Remix) – 5:31
2. "Alarm Call" (Teasmade Dub) – 5:50
3. "Alarm Call" (Alan Braxe & Ben Diamond Edit) – 4:31
- UK 12-inch single 5
1. "Alarm Call" (Radio Mix) – 3:20
2. "Alarm Call" (Album Version) – 4:19
3. "Alarm Call" (Snooze Button Mix) – 7:12
4. "Hunter" (Moodswing Remix)** – 3:02
- UK 12-inch single 6
1. "Alarm Call" (Potage du Jour)** – 4:20
2. "Alarm Call" (Locked)** – 3:02
3. "Alarm Call" (Phunk You)** – 3:39
- European CD single
1. "Alarm Call" (Radio Mix) – 3:21
2. "Alarm Call" (French Dub)*** – 5:32
3. "Alarm Call" (Potage du Jour)** – 4:20
4. "Alarm Call" (Gangsta)** – 3:25
5. "Alarm Call" (Bjeck Mix) – 6:27
- UK CD single 1 and digital download 1
1. "Alarm Call" (Radio Mix) – 3:20
2. "Alarm Call" (Rhythmic Phonetics Mix)* – 5:13
3. "Alarm Call" (Bjeck Mix) – 6:27
- UK CD single 2 and digital download 2
1. "Alarm Call" (Potage du Jour)** – 4:20
2. "Alarm Call" (French Edit)*** – 3:51
3. "Alarm Call" (French Dub)*** – 5:32
- UK CD single 3 and digital download 3
1. "Alarm Call" (Phunk You)** – 3:39
2. "Alarm Call" (Gangsta)** – 3:25
3. "Alarm Call" (Locked)** – 3:02

* Remix by Matmos
** Remix by Mark Bell
*** Remix by Alan Braxe & Ben Diamond

== Charts ==
Weekly chart performance for "Alarm Call"
| Chart (1998) | Peak position |
|---|---|
| Iceland (Íslenski Listinn Topp 40) | 16 |
| Iceland (Íslenski Listinn Topp 40) French mix | 10 |
| Scottish Singles Sales (Official Charts) | 47 |
| UK Singles (Official Charts) | 33 |
| UK Indie (Official Charts) | 3 |

== Release history ==
Release dates and formats for "Alarm Call"
| Region | Date | Label(s) | Format(s) | Ref. |
|---|---|---|---|---|
| United Kingdom | 23 November 1998 | One Little Indian | Contemporary hit radio | |
| United Kingdom | 23 November 1998 | One Little Indian | CD1; CD2; CD3; 12-inch (3); 12-inch (5) | |
| United Kingdom | 7 December 1998 | One Little Indian | 12-inch (4) | |
| France | 4 January 1999 | Barclay; Mother | Maxi CD | |
| United Kingdom | 18 January 1999 | One Little Indian | Box set | |

== Bibliography ==
- Mackay, Emily (5 October 2017). Björk's Homogenic. Bloomsbury Publishing USA. ISBN 9781501322754 – via Google Books.
- Pytlik, Mark (2003). Bjork: Wow and Flutter. ECW Press. ISBN 9781550225563 – via Google Books.
