= Jóga =

1997 single by Björk

- 12-inch vinyl cover

Single by Björk

from the album Homogenic
- B-side: "All Is Full of Love"; "Sod Off"; "Immature"; "So Broken"
- Released: 15 September 1997
- Studio: El Cortijo (Marbella)
- Genre: Electronica; baroque pop
- Length: 3:22 (video version); 4:03 (radio edit); 5:01 (album version); 4:42 (strings and vocals)
- Label: One Little Indian; Mother; Polydor
- Songwriters: Björk; Sjón
- Producers: Björk; Mark Bell

Björk singles chronology
"I Miss You" (1997)	"Jóga" (1997)	"Bachelorette" (1997)

Music video
- "Jóga" on YouTube

"Jóga" is a song recorded by Icelandic singer, songwriter, and actress Björk for her third studio album, Homogenic (1997). (Note: Homogenic is officially considered to be Björk's third solo album, although technically it can be viewed as fourth if to count her 1977 juvenilia work, or fifth, counting in her 1990 jazz output Gling-Gló.) An electronica song, "Jóga" fuses these elements with baroque and classical styles. The track's sound was partially inspired by Icelandic music, containing what have been described as "volcanic beats". Lyrically, the piece is an ode to Björk's native land and her best friend, while containing subtexts relating to the state of emergency.

"Jóga" was released as the lead single from Homogenic on 15 September 1997 to critical acclaim, with reviewers praising her powerful vocal performance, as well as the track's composition and overall production. Commercially, the song was a moderate success, but peaked at number one in Björk's native Iceland.

== Recording and production ==
"With this song, I really had a sort of National Anthem in mind. Not the National Anthem but certain classic Icelandic songs – very romantic, very proud"

— Björk interviewed by David Hemingway

Like most of Homogenic, "Jóga" was recorded and produced at El Cortijo in Málaga, Spain. Björk wrote the song while walking and admiring the landscape, a common way for her to write songs since childhood.

She explained "an overall picture" of it to engineer Markus Dravs, who then came out with a rhythm that she felt was "too abstract". Mark Bell, the producer of the track, then came and "took 99 percent of what [he] did and came up with some noises", giving Dravs new ideas. Björk wrote the string arrangements, which were provided late in the production process by the Icelandic String Octet.

== Music and lyrics ==
"Jóga" is dedicated to—and named after—Björk's best friend, Jóga Gnarr Jóhannsdóttir (the wife of former Mayor of Reykjavík Jón Gnarr), whom Björk would usually thank in her album credits. The song is also a dedication to her native Iceland, an example of Björk's desire to have a conceptual focus on the country for Homogenic. Referring to this concept, she told Oor: "The electronic beats are the rhythm, the heartbeat. The violins create the old fashioned atmosphere, the colouring." "Jóga" has been described as "the real conceptual heart of the record" and "a sonic picture of the geographical beauty of her homeland". The track showcases these hybrid elements of strings and electronic backing beats through the album, thus being described as "baroque electronica" by Slant Magazine's Sal Cinquemani.

The strong beats—referred to as "volcanic"—reflect Iceland's primal and chaotic nature. Due to its harsh beats and halfway drop, some modern critics have described the track as "proto dubstep". "Jóga" is a love song; its lyrics were written by poet Sjón, Björk's friend and collaborator. Björk explained her inability to write the song's lyrics in an interview with MuchMusic: "I tried to write that tune but, I mean, I just wanted mainly to write lyrics. It was just pathetic. I was like 'her... her...' it was like 'love... love...' I couldn't even put it into words. So, you know, it's—yeah, it's probably the—I think it's the fiercest love song I have written, I think." She sings about the beauty of being in a "state of emergency", and thanks someone for pushing her into it.

== Critical reception ==
"Jóga" has received acclaim from music critics ever since its release. Heather Phares of AllMusic wrote that "Björk lets a little light shine through "Jóga"" and described it as a "moving song", listing it as one of the album highlights. Furthermore, Sal Cinquemani of Slant Magazine labelled the track "adrenaline", while Spin's James Hunter found that Björk delved into "the fuller, more womanly tone she unveiled on Post," and that the song "depicts one woman's emotional agenda in the presence of luxurious modern architecture: exaggerated corners, nonexistent ceilings, and beautiful doors."

David Browne of Entertainment Weekly also commented on "Jóga", writing that it was more "somber" than another single from Homogenic, "Bachelorette", and Björk sings the lyrics with "the strings swelling luxuriantly", whereas Neva Chonin of Rolling Stone found the singer's desire of a "state of emergency" "erotic", and one that comes across as her finding it "both delicious and dangerous". Robert Christgau, in his review for the album, placed it as one of the recommended tracks alongside "Bachelorette". British magazine Music Week rated it five out of five, picking it as Single of the Week. They described it as "a real beauty, with Björk's voice allowed to shine above spooky beats and lush strings."

In Slant Magazine's list "The 100 Best Singles of the 1990s", "Jóga" was placed at number 35; alongside the ranking, the track was praised, said to contain "one of the Icelandic singer-songwriter's fiercest vocal performances to date", as well as that the "sweeping string arrangement is its true star".

== Commercial performance ==
"Jóga" was a commercial success in Björk's native Iceland, peaking atop the Íslenski Listinn Top 40 the week of 23–30 October 1997. Elsewhere, the song was moderately successful, peaking within the top 20 in Finland and the top 40 in Sweden.

While all of Björk's first 11 singles reached the top 40 of the UK Singles Chart, including three top-ten singles from Post (1995), "Jóga" was ruled ineligible to chart since it was released solely as a three-CD and VHS box set (as well as individual releases of the formats). Despite Björk's record label One Little Indian attempting to convince the Official Charts Company (OCC) that the VHS was bundled for free, "Jóga" remained barred from the chart as its release exceeded the chart's three-format limit. However, the song managed to enter the chart months after its release, peaking at number 191 on the chart dated 28 February 1998.

== Music video ==
A computer-animated Björk pries open a hole in her chest to reveal an island in the music video for "Jóga"

The music video was directed by Michel Gondry and filmed in Iceland.

The video for "Jóga" is a departure from her other videos as it features a simple concept of focusing primarily on different Icelandic terrains and landscapes with Björk's presence only in the beginning and towards the end. With the aid of computer animation, earthquakes begin to separate and shift the chunks of land along fault lines. The video ends with a computerised image of an island floating inside Björk's chest.

== Track listing ==
"Jóga" (UK CD1)
No.	Title	Length
1.	"Jóga" (Howie B Main Mix)	5:00
2.	"Jóga" (String and Vocal Mix)	4:40
3.	"Jóga" (Buzz Water Mix)	5:06
4.	"All Is Full of Love" (Choice Mix)	4:35
Total length:		19:21

"Jóga" (UK CD2)
No.	Title	Length
1.	"Jóga"	5:00
2.	"Sod Off"	2:56
3.	"Immature" (Björk's version)	2:51
4.	"So Broken"	5:59
Total length:		16:46

"Jóga" (UK CD3)
No.	Title	Length
1.	"Jóga"	5:06
2.	"Jóga" (Alec Empire Mix)	8:44
3.	"Jóga" (Alec Empire Digital Hardcore Mix 1)	6:06
4.	"Jóga" (Alec Empire Digital Hardcore Mix 2)	6:06
Total length:		26:02

"Jóga" (EP - TPLP81CD)
No.	Title	Length
1.	"Jóga" (Howie B Main Mix)	5:00
2.	"Jóga" (String and Vocal Mix)	4:40
3.	"Jóga" (Buzz Water Mix)	5:06
4.	"All Is Full of Love" (Choice Mix)	4:35
5.	"Jóga"	5:00
6.	"Sod Off"	2:56
7.	"Immature" (Björk's version)	2:51
8.	"So Broken"	5:59
9.	"Jóga" (Alec Empire Mix)	8:44
10.	"Jóga" (Alec Empire Digital Hardcore Mix 1)	6:06
11.	"Jóga" (Alec Empire Digital Hardcore Mix 2)	6:06
Total length:		62:09

"Jóga" (12" single)
No.	Title	Length
1.	"Jóga" (Alec Empire "Empire State of Emergency" Remix)	5:59
2.	"Jóga" (Alec Empire "The Destroyer" Remix)	6:02
3.	"Jóga" (Alec Empire "The Planet of Ice" Remix)	3:24
Total length:		15:25

== Charts ==
=== Weekly charts ===
Weekly chart performance for "Jóga"
Chart (1997–1998)	Peak position
Australia (ARIA)	70
Belgium (Ultratip Bubbling Under Flanders)	13
Finland (Suomen virallinen lista)	16
Iceland (Íslenski Listinn Topp 40)	1
Netherlands (Single Top 100)	95
New Zealand (RIANZ)	43
Sweden (Topplistan)	37
Switzerland (Schweizer Hitparade)	49
UK Singles (OCC)	191
UK Airplay (Music Control)	100
UK Indie (Official Charts)	40

=== Year-end charts ===
Year-end chart performance for "Jóga"
Chart (1997)	Position
Iceland (Íslenski Listinn Topp 40)	11

== Release history ==
Release dates and formats for "Jóga"
Region	Date	Format(s)	Label(s)	Ref.
United States	15 September 1997	Alternative radio	Elektra Records	
Germany	15 September 1997	Maxi CD	Mother	
Japan	18 September 1997	Maxi CD	Polydor	
United Kingdom	27 September 1997	12-inch vinyl; box set; three maxi CDs; VHS	One Little Indian	
United Kingdom	27 April 1998	CD album; Triple LP album	One Little Indian	
