= Homogenic =

Studio album by Björk
- Released: 20 September 1997
- Recorded: 1996–1997
- Studios: Björk's residence (London); El Cortijo (San Pedro de Alcántara)
- Genres: Electronica; trip hop; art pop; experimental
- Length: 43:32
- Label: One Little Indian
- Producers: Björk; Mark Bell; Guy Sigsworth; Howie B; Markus Dravs

Björk chronology
Telegram (1996)	Homogenic (1997)	Selmasongs (2000)

Singles from Homogenic
- 1. "Jóga" Released: 15 September 1997; 2. "Bachelorette" Released: 1 December 1997; 3. "Hunter" Released: 3 June 1998; 4. "Alarm Call" Released: 30 November 1998; 5. "All Is Full of Love" Released: 7 June 1999

Homogenic is the third studio album by Icelandic recording artist Björk. (Note: Homogenic is officially considered to be Björk's third solo album, although technically it can be viewed as fourth if to count her 1977 juvenilia work, or fifth, counting in her 1990 jazz output Gling-Gló.) It was released on 20 September 1997 by One Little Indian Records. Produced by Björk, Mark Bell, Guy Sigsworth, Howie B, and Markus Dravs, the album marked a stylistic change, focusing on similar-sounding music combining electronic beats and string instruments with songs in tribute to her native country Iceland.

Homogenic was originally to be produced in her home in London, but was halted due to media attention from Björk surviving a murder attempt by a stalker. She later relocated to Spain to record the album. It marked the first of several production collaborations between Björk and Bell, whom she would cite as a major influence on her musical career.

Upon its release, Homogenic received widespread critical acclaim. It topped the Icelandic albums chart, peaking at number 28 on the US Billboard 200 and number four on the UK Albums Chart. The album produced five singles—"Jóga", "Bachelorette", "Hunter", "Alarm Call", and "All Is Full of Love"—and was further promoted with the Homogenic tour (1997–1999). Retrospectively, Homogenic has continued receiving critical acclaim, being listed among the best albums of all time by numerous critics.

== Writing and recording ==
After an extensive tour in support of her 1995 album Post, Björk returned to her home in Maida Vale with an urgent need to write new songs as a form of therapy. Björk would let audio engineer Markus Dravs into her home studio to start creating new songs. The sessions with Dravs and Björk were casual, with Björk allowing Dravs freedom with the album. Björk only left the studio to cook meals for the both of them. One of the first songs created during the sessions was "5 Years" which Dravs created the fast beat for. The progress of Homogenic in these sessions was halted due to a media sensation caused by the suicide of Björk's stalker Ricardo López. To deal with the stress of being at home during this incident, Björk imagined herself as the protagonist in a Spanish soap opera. The character's image inspired a song titled "So Broken" which she sang to herself in her kitchen. The song was later included on Japanese and Spanish limited editions of the album.

To record in privacy away from the sudden unwanted media interest, Björk's tour drummer Trevor Morais offered his studio in Spain. Björk went to Málaga and arranged to meet with flamenco guitarist Raimundo Amador. Björk had originally intended to stay in Málaga only briefly, but later decided to record the entirety of Homogenic there. Björk made a final trip out of the country before staying in Spain. As she had done since moving to London, Björk returned to Iceland for Christmas. While there, she wrote more new songs for Homogenic, including "Jóga". Before returning to Spain to record, Björk was sidetracked by a two-week worldwide press tour for the promotion of her remix album Telegram, which had just been released. After returning to the studio in Spain in late January, Björk decided to end work with producer Nellee Hooper, who had produced both Debut and Post, as she felt they had "stopped surprising each other". Björk had intended to produce the album alone, but sought collaborators including Dravs, Howie B, Guy Sigsworth and LFO's Mark Bell. Howie B had worked with Björk on Debut and Post and Sigsworth had played harpsichord on Post. The American hip hop group Wu-Tang Clan almost contributed to the production of Homogenic, but were unable due to their production on the album Wu-Tang Forever, which had taken longer than planned. Most of the melodies on the album were created by Björk, who then composed string sections on a Casio keyboard and brought them to programmers who would add rhythmic patterns. Björk had wanted to have Mark Bell contribute to her albums Debut and Post; Bell was credited for the majority of the album's production, including the songs "Pluto", "Alarm Call", and the bassline in "Jóga". Björk stated that she "trusts and respects what [Bell] does for me. If I were to say who has influenced me most it would be Stockhausen, Kraftwerk, Brian Eno and Mark Bell". Other unorthodox methods of recording were used during the production, including Björk wanting to record outside on the porch and using non-professionals to help with production, such as Rebecca Storey, who was hired as a babysitter but added to the production staff after showing interest in the equipment.

String arrangements were added late in the recording process. Björk had friend Eumir Deodato conduct, transcribe and compose original pieces for the few songs that Björk did not arrange for herself. To keep with the Icelandic theme of the album, Björk ordered the services of the Icelandic String Octet. By June 1997, the album was behind schedule and Björk was uncertain of the final track listing and unhappy with some of the recorded vocals.

== Music and lyrics ==
"Hunter"
The third single from Homogenic showcases hybrid elements of strings and electronic backing beats heard throughout the album.

Homogenic is an electronica, trip hop, art pop, and experimental album. Additionally, it contains elements of IDM and techno. As Björk wanted to create an album with "a simple sound" and "only one flavour", the recording commenced with the working title Homogeneous. Björk soon altered the title to Homogenic, suggesting the concept of home:

I'm really seeking after something that's Icelandic. And I want it to be more me, this album. Debut and Post are a bit like the Tin Tin books. Sort of Tin Tin goes to Congo. Tin Tin goes to Tibet. So it's all these different flavors, me sort of trying all these different things on, which is very exciting, but now I think it's a bit more Björk goes home.

Heather Phares of AllMusic described the sound of Homogenic as a "fusion of chilly strings (courtesy of the Icelandic String Octet), stuttering, abstract beats, and unique touches like accordion and glass harmonica". The album differs from her previous two releases stylistically, and Neva Chonin of Rolling Stone stated the album was "certain to be rough going for fans looking for the sweet melodies and peppy dance collages of her earlier releases". As with other Björk releases, it has been difficult for critics to classify Homogenic within a musical genre. Tiny Mix Tapes considered that "Björk has managed to create something so refreshingly unique that trying to categorize and label the music is rather dubious." Writing for Beats per Minute, Cole Zercoe felt Homogenic represented a pinnacle work of trip hop, forming part of "a sort of holy trinity of this musical aesthetic" along with Massive Attack's Mezzanine and Portishead's Dummy.

Björk wanted Homogenic to have a conceptual focus on her native Iceland. Producer Markus Dravs recalled Björk wanting it to sound like "rough volcanoes with soft moss growing all over it..." In an interview for Oor, Björk explained that "in Iceland, everything revolves around nature, 24 hours a day. Earthquakes, snowstorms, rain, ice, volcanic eruptions, geysers... Very elementary and uncontrollable. But at the other hand, Iceland is incredibly modern; everything is hi-tech. The number of people owning a computer is as high as nowhere else in the world. That contradiction is also on Homogenic. The electronic beats are the rhythm, the heartbeat. The violins create the old-fashioned atmosphere, the colouring."

Björk's vocals on Homogenic range from primitive-sounding screams to a traditional singing method used by Icelandic choir men, a combination of speaking and singing as illustrated in the song "Unravel". The majority of songs on Homogenic have lyrics about love and failed relationships. The song "Jóga" was written as a tribute to her best friend and tour masseuse of the same name. Björk called "All is Full of Love" a song about "believing in love" and that "Love isn't just about two persons. It's everywhere around you". "All Neon Like" contains snippets of a poem Björk wrote called "Techno Prayer" in 1996. The song "5 Years" appeared in live form a few weeks after her breakup with musician Tricky and music journalists considered it a response to it. "Bachelorette" was originally written for director Bernardo Bertolucci for his film Stealing Beauty. Björk later faxed Bertolucci, informing him the song would be used for her album instead. "Bachelorette" and "Jóga" were written with Icelandic poet Sjón, because Björk wanted to use epic lyrics. "Immature" was written about mistakes in past relationships, shortly after the breakup with Goldie. Björk described "Pluto" as about "being plastered, that need to destroy everything so you can start again". "Unravel" is a song about lamenting love, with brief flashes of hope.

== Marketing ==
The album was released later than One Little Independent Records had intended. Björk was behind schedule and the album's cover design by Nick Knight needed a reshoot. Towards the end of August 1997, One Little Independent delayed the album by a month. Homogenic was released on 22 September 1997 on One Little Independent in the United Kingdom and on 23 September Elektra Records in North America on compact disc and cassette. The album was later issued on vinyl and DualDisc formats. The Japanese limited edition of Homogenic included several bonus tracks and remixed versions of songs. The DualDisc release featured the full album on the CD side and the DVD side included the album with superior sound quality and the music videos for the singles.

=== Imagery ===
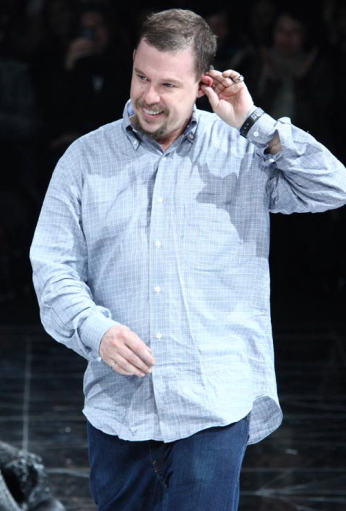
The album cover for Homogenic was produced by close friend Alexander McQueen (pictured), who also directed one of the two music videos for "Alarm Call".

The themes of Homogenic are reflected in the album cover designed by Alexander McQueen. According to McQueen biographer Andrew Wilson, Björk approached McQueen after seeing the futuristic image of model Devon Aoki in the February 1997 edition of Visionaire. Dressed by McQueen and photographed by Nick Knight, who shot the Homogenic cover as well, Aoki wears a pink funnel-necked dress with her skin cast in a blueish metallic hue, one eyeball blankly white, a large safety pin closing a slash through her forehead, and her hair pulled into tight buns as she challenges the camera with a direct gaze.

Björk explained her vision for the Homogenic cover, which carries a resemblance to "someone who is put into an impossible situation, so impossible that she has to become a warrior. A warrior who has to fight not with weapons, but with love. I had 10 kilos of hair on my head, and special contact lenses and a manicure that prevented me from eating with my fingers, and gaffer tape around my waist and high clogs so I couldn't walk easily."

=== Singles ===
"Jóga" was released as the lead single from Homogenic on 15 September 1997 to widespread critical acclaim. It peaked atop the Íslenski Listinn Topp 40 in Iceland, while reaching the top 20 in Finland. Due to its formats, it was initially ineligible to enter the UK Singles Chart, but later peaked at number 191. Its mostly computer-animated accompanying music video was directed by Michel Gondry and focuses primarily on different Icelandic terrains and landscapes with Björk's presence only in the beginning and towards the end.

"Bachelorette" was released as the second single on 8 December. While less successful than "Jóga" in Björk's native Iceland, peaking at number six, it was an improvement from "Jóga" in the United Kingdom, where it peaked at numbers 21 and two on the UK Singles Chart and UK Indie Chart, respectively. Gondry returned to direct the music video for "Bachelorette", which features Björk as Bachelorette, a woman who finds a book titled My Story buried in her garden which begins to write itself, describing what Bachelorette does as she describes it. It won the MTV Video Music Award for Best Art Direction and was nominated for the Grammy Award for Best Short Form Music Video.

"Hunter" was released as the third single on 5 October 1998. Despite being critically acclaimed, it was a commercial failure, as it peaked only at number 44 on the UK Singles Chart. Its accompanying music video, directed by Paul White, features a close-up of a bald Björk singing into the camera as she morphs into a polar bear and then back to her original state.

"Alarm Call" was originally scheduled for release as the third single, but switched places with "Hunter". It was released as the fourth single on 30 November 1998 and returned Björk to the top ten of Íslenski Listinn Topp 40, as its French mix peaked at number ten. In the UK, the song peaked at numbers 33 and three on the UK Singles Chart and UK Indie Chart, respectively. The song's accompanying music video was directed by Alexander McQueen, who designed the cover artwork for Homogenic, and features Björk floating on a raft on a river in the jungle and her scenes are intercut with footage of snakes, crocodiles, and other animals, with Björk playing with them.

"All Is Full of Love" was released as the fifth and final single on 7 June 1999. DVD single was simultaneously released; some publications regard it as the first DVD single release ever. Critically acclaimed, the song peaked at numbers 24 and three on the UK Singles Chart and UK Indie Chart, respectively. It became the only single from Homogenic to enter a chart in the United States, peaking at number eight on the Dance/Electronic Singles Sales chart. Directed by Chris Cunningham, the song's music video depicts Björk as a robot being assembled in a factory, who passionately kisses another robot. The video is often cited as one of the best of all time and a milestone in computer animation; it has been displayed in art exhibitions and was on display at the Museum of Modern Art in New York City.

== Touring ==
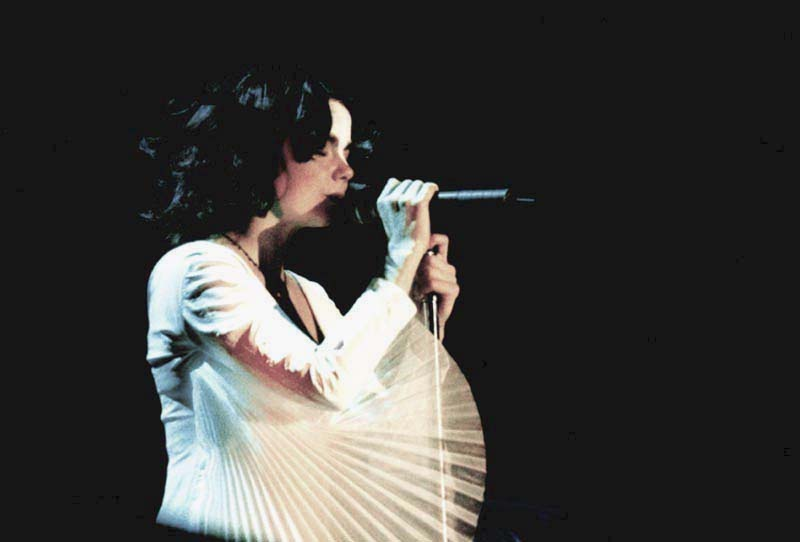
Björk performing during the Homogenic Tour in 1997

Promotion of Homogenic started on 8 June 1997, when Björk performed several songs from the album at the Tibetan Freedom Concert held at Downing Stadium in New York City. The album was launched on 15 July at the Old Truman Brewery in London. In the United Kingdom, Björk performed the lead single "Jóga" on TFI Friday on 19 September, and Top of the Pops on 3 October. She performed the second single "Bachelorette" on the American sketch comedy show Saturday Night Live on 18 October, at the 1997 MTV Europe Music Awards on 6 November, on Later... with Jools Holland with "Jóga" and "Hunter" on 29 November, and again in the United States on The Tonight Show with Jay Leno on 22 May 1998. In France, Björk performed "Bachelorette" with "Jóga" on Nulle Part Ailleurs on 11 February, and with "Hunter" on Hit Machine on 20 June. She performed the fourth single "Alarm Call" on CD:UK on 5 December.

When the release of Homogenic was delayed by a month, its tour began with the audience not being familiar with the album's songs since it had not been released yet. The tour started at the beginning of September with a backing band that consisted only of Mark Bell and made stops in Germany, the Netherlands, France, Belgium, Spain, and England. These shows were brief live shows lasting about half an hour consisting of only new material. Another tour took place in late October and lasted less than four weeks. Stops on this tour included Italy, Switzerland, France, England, Scotland, Germany, Ireland, and Denmark. In late November, Björk was diagnosed with a kidney infection and while she was still healthy she was advised to take a three-week rest and was forced to cancel her American tour. A North American tour with Radiohead was announced in 1998, but it was later canceled due to difficulties with changing the stage between performances of the acts. Björk had another tour in the middle of 1998 through Europe, and outside of the continent through other countries, including Chile, Brazil and Argentina. Opening acts for portions of the tour included electronic musician μ-Ziq.

== Critical reception ==
Professional ratings
Contemporary reviews
Review scores
Source	Rating
Chicago Tribune	3.5/4 stars
Entertainment Weekly	A
The Guardian	4/5 stars
Los Angeles Times	3.5/4 stars
Music Week	3/5 stars
NME	9/10
Rolling Stone	4/5 stars
Spin	9/10
The Times	7/10
Uncut	4/5 stars

Homogenic received widespread acclaim from critics. David Browne of Entertainment Weekly stated that "Homogenic could have been stuffy and dull—Sting with a sex-change operation. It's a testament to Bjork's continued weirdness that even overtures toward adulthood come out delightfully skewed". Neva Chonin of Rolling Stone cited it as "one of the boldest—and most exciting—albums of the year", while Los Angeles Times critic Richard Cromelin wrote that it "affirms [Björk's] stature as one of pop music's most uncompromising adventurers". NME's Ted Kessler praised Homogenic as Björk's best album and "her most emotional, highly charged and groovy record, as well as a stinging triumph for the spirit of adventure," while The Philadelphia Inquirer remarked that it "boldly ventures into the techno future while never losing its intensely personal vision and human heart". In another positive review, Spin opined that with the album, Björk didn't "demonize the artificial and assign innocence to the natural." The Chicago Tribune stated that her voice on Homogenic was "like a beacon guiding the listener through a strange, wonderful forest of sound."

Caroline Sullivan of The Guardian praised the "emotional kick" that she found Post lacked, in addition to lyricism she found to be "less opaque". Though Music Week praised the album for its "darker atmosphere" and "more consistent sound", a more negative review came from Stephen Thompson of The A.V. Club, who said in contrast that "Homogenic is stylish enough, and it's as restlessly creative as you'd expect, but the album rarely gives Björk's songs a chance to assert themselves".

=== Accolades ===
American critics rated Homogenic highly in year-end polls. It ranked at number nine in The Village Voice's Pazz & Jop critics' poll, while Spin ranked it number four in their "Top 20 Albums of the Year". In Britain, Melody Maker ranked it at number 33 in the "Albums of the Year" and NME placed it at number 15 in a critics' poll. In 2024, the album was ranked at number 45 on Apple Music's 100 Best albums of All Time.

Homogenic was nominated in the Best Alternative Music Performance category at the 40th Annual Grammy Awards (1998), losing to Radiohead's OK Computer.

Michel Gondry's music video for "Bachelorette" was nominated for Best Short Form Music Video at the 41st Annual Grammy Awards (1999), but lost to Jonas Åkerlund's video for Madonna's "Ray of Light". At the next year's ceremony, Chris Cunningham's video for "All Is Full of Love" was nominated for the same award, but lost to Korn's "Freak on a Leash".

Homogenic earned Björk the Brit Award for International Female Solo Artist at the 1998 ceremony. Accepting the award, she declared: "I am grateful grapefruit."

== Commercial performance ==
Homogenic debuted and peaked at number four on the UK Albums Chart on 4 October 1997, spending 17 weeks on the chart. It debuted at number six on the Australian Albums Chart on 12 October 1997, but descended to number 45 after five weeks on the chart. The album debuted at number eight on the New Zealand Albums Chart on 12 October 1997, and peaked at number six the following week, but descended after six weeks on the chart.

In the United States, Homogenic debuted at number 28 on the Billboard 200, spending a total of nine weeks inside the chart, where its final position was at number 164. The album was certified gold on 1 August 2001 by the Recording Industry Association of America (RIAA) for shipments of 500,000 copies. Homogenic debuted at twenty on the Canadian Albums Chart, becoming Björk's first album to enter the chart but spent only one week there. It was certified gold by the Music Canada on 12 June 1998.

== Legacy ==
Professional ratings
Retrospective reviews
Review scores
Source	Rating
AllMusic	5/5 stars
The Encyclopedia of Popular Music	4/5 stars
The Great Rock Discography	7/10 stars
Piero Scaruffi	7/10
Pitchfork	10/10 (Note: Prior to the 10/10 rating in 2017, Homogenic received a 9.9/10 rating on release.)
The Rolling Stone Album Guide	4.5/5 stars
Slant Magazine	5/5 stars
Spin	5/5 stars
Tiny Mix Tapes	5/5 marks
Tom Hull	B

In the years following its release, Homogenic has continued to receive acclaim from critics, audiences and musicians. In a retrospective review, Heather Phares of AllMusic cited Homogenic as being more emotionally deep than any of Björk's previous work and called it a "seamless fusion of chilly strings, stuttering, abstract beats, and unique touches like an accordion and glass harmonica." In 2002, Homogenic placed at number ten on Slant Magazine's list of "The Greatest Electronic Albums of the 20th Century". In 2003, it was placed at number 21 on the music webzine Pitchfork's list of the top one hundred albums of the 1990s, in which it was praised as "one of the most perfectly formed records of any era, and it is entirely possible that Björk will never approach this level of consistently enrapturing beauty again". In 2007, Slant Magazine critic Sal Cinquemani wrote that "if not the greatest electronic album of all time, it's certainly the greatest of its decade". The same year, Spin writer Phoebe Reilly called it Björk's "most sublime and vulnerable album" in a career retrospective. In 2011, Slant Magazine placed the album at number one on their list of best albums of the 1990s. In 2017, Philip Sherburne of Pitchfork observed that it "showcased a newly focused side of the musician while embracing all of her most provocative contradictions." In 2020, Rolling Stone ranked the album at number 202 on its "500 Greatest Albums of All Time" list. In 2023, British GQ ranked it at number four on their list of ten best electronic albums of all time.

According to Tiny Mix Tapes, Homogenic is "one of the most groundbreaking albums of all-time, an album that assuredly caused countless hearts to soar." With Homogenic, Björk has been credited for connecting art pop to electronic dance music. Philip Sherburne of Pitchfork described the album as impactful on Björk's own discography, stating: "In retrospect, it's easy to see the way that Homogenic paves the way for later career triumphs like Vespertine and Vulnicura: In its formal audacity and sustained emotional intensity, it represents a phase shift from Debut and Post, fine though they were." In an interview with Spin, Radiohead singer Thom Yorke called the song "Unravel" "one of the most beautiful songs I've ever heard." The band would cover the song as part of a 2007 live webcast. Their guitarist Ed O'Brien claimed Björk inspired them to change their musical style for their fourth studio album Kid A (2000), stating: "I think we've all been a bit envious about the way Björk has been able to reinvent music." Bloc Party frontman Kele Okereke cited it as his favourite album. "She's a real genius," he said. "No one's been as radical or innovative and still made pop music. I got into it when I was first discovering music. It still has a deep resonance for me." Homogenic has also been noted to have had influence on Kanye West by various sources, as he departed hip hop in favor of a more experimental sound for his fourth studio album 808s & Heartbreak (2008).

== Track listing ==
All tracks are written by Björk, and produced by Björk and Mark Bell, except where noted.

Homogenic
No.	Title	Writer(s)	Producer(s)	Length
1.	"Hunter"			4:13
2.	"Jóga"	Björk; Sjón		5:05
3.	"Unravel"	Björk; Guy Sigsworth	Björk; Sigsworth	3:17
4.	"Bachelorette"	Björk; Sjón	Björk	5:16
5.	"All Neon Like"			5:52
6.	"5 Years"			4:29
7.	"Immature"		Bell	3:06
8.	"Alarm Call"			4:19
9.	"Pluto"	Björk; Bell		3:19
10.	"All Is Full of Love"		Howie B	4:32
Total length:				43:32

Japanese limited edition
No.	Title	Writer(s)	Producer(s)	Length
11.	"Jóga" (Howie B Main Mix)	Björk; Sjón	Björk; Bell; Howie B^{[a]}	5:03
12.	"Sod Off"			2:56
13.	"Immature" (Björk's version)		Björk	2:50
14.	"So Broken"		Björk	6:01
15.	"Nature Is Ancient"	Björk; Bell		3:39
16.	"Jóga" (Alec Empire Remix)	Björk; Sjón	Björk; Bell; Alec Empire^{[a]}	8:46
Total length:				73:09

=== Notes ===
- ^a signifies an additional producer
- Spanish limited edition pressings include a bonus disc containing "So Broken".
- Surrounded DualDisc pressings include a bonus DVD containing music videos for "Jóga", "Bachelorette", "Hunter", "Alarm Call", and "All Is Full of Love".

== Personnel ==
Credits adapted from the liner notes of Homogenic.

Musicians

- Alasdair Alloy – glass harmonica
- Mark Bell – keyboards
- Björk – keyboards, vocals
- Mike Brittain – bass
- Jeffrey Bryant – horn
- Paul Gardhaim – bass
- Isobel Griffiths – orchestra contractor
- Steve Henderson – timbales, timpani
- Yasuhiro Kobayashi – accordion
- Chris Laurence – bass
- Trevor Morais – drums, electronic drums
- Paul Pritchard – bass
- Frank Ricotti – snare drums
- Guy Sigsworth – clavichord, keyboards, pipe organ
- Mike Thompson – horn
- Helen Tunstall – harp
- Strings
  - Vaughan Armon, Sigurbjorn Bernhardsson, Mark Berrow, Ben Cruft, Sigrun Edvaldsdottir, Roger Garland, Wilfred Gibson, Perry Mason, Jim McLeod, Perry Montague-Mason, Peter Oxer, Maciej Rakowski, Una Sveinbjarnardottir, Sif Tulinius, Gavyn Wright – violins
  - Roger Chase, Hrund Hardardottir, Bill Hawkes, Peter Lale, George Robertson, Moeidur Anna Sigurdardottir – violas
  - Sigurdur Bjarki Gunnarsson, Paul Kegg, Helen Liebmann, Martin Loveday, Jon R. Ornolfsson, John Tunnell – cellos

Technical personnel

- Björk – arrangements, programming, production
- Howie B – programming, production, mixing
- Mark Bell – programming, production, drum programming, crew
- Danny Joe Brown Band – programming, mixing assistance
- Richard Brown – programming
- Kirsten Cowie – mixing assistance, assistance
- Eumir Deodato – arrangements, orchestration, transcription
- Marius de Vries – programming
- Markus Dravs – programming, production, engineering, drum programming, crew
- Jason Groucott – mixing assistance, assistance
- James Loughrey – mixing assistance, assistance
- Sie Medway-Smith – mixing assistance, assistance
- Rob Murphy – mixing assistance, assistance
- Nilesh Patel – mastering
- Russel Polden – mixing assistance, assistance
- Steve Price – engineering
- Guy Sigsworth – production
- Tony Stanton – copying
- Mark "Spike" Stent – mixing, crew
- Rebecca Storey – mixing assistance, assistance
- Paul Walton – mixing assistance
- Jason Westbrook – mixing assistance, assistance

Artwork

- Alexander McQueen – art direction
- Nick Knight – photography
- Katy England – styling
- Me Company – sleeve design

== Charts ==
=== Weekly charts ===
1997 weekly chart performance
Chart	Peak position
Australian Albums (ARIA)	6
Austrian Albums (Ö3 Austria)	5
Belgian Albums (Ultratop Flanders)	6
Belgian Albums (Ultratop Wallonia)	13
Canadian Albums (Billboard)	20
Danish Albums (Hitlisten)	1
Dutch Albums (Album Top 100)	12
European Top 100 Albums (Music & Media)	4
Finnish Albums (Suomen virallinen lista)	10
French Albums (SNEP)	2
German Albums (Offizielle Top 100)	10
Greek Albums (IFPI)	10
Hungarian Albums (MAHASZ)	31
Icelandic Albums (Tónlist)	1
Japanese Albums (Oricon)	16
New Zealand Albums (RMNZ)	6
Norwegian Albums (VG-lista)	3
Portuguese Albums (AFP)	4
Scottish Albums (Official Charts)	8
Spanish Albums (AFYVE)	33
Swedish Albums (Sverigetopplistan)	5
Swiss Albums (Schweizer Hitparade)	13
UK Albums (Official Charts)	4
UK Independent Albums (Official Charts)	2
US Billboard 200	28

=== Year-end charts ===
1997 year-end chart performance
Chart	Position
Belgian Albums (Ultratop Flanders)	81
Belgian Albums (Ultratop Wallonia)	95
European Top 100 Albums (Music & Media)	54
French Albums (SNEP)	43
Norwegian Albums (VG-lista)	56

1998 year-end chart performance
Chart	Position
French Albums (SNEP)	56

== Certifications ==
Certifications and sales
Region	Certification	Certified units/sales
Canada (Music Canada)	Gold	50,000^{^}
Denmark (IFPI Danmark)	Gold	30,000
Iceland	—	8,000
Norway	—	28,000
Japan (RIAJ)	Gold	100,000^{^}
Switzerland (IFPI Switzerland)	Gold	25,000^{^}
United Kingdom (BPI)	Gold	216,000
United States (RIAA)	Gold	501,000
Summaries
Europe (IFPI)	Platinum	1,000,000^{*}
^{*} Sales figures based on certification alone.^{^} Shipments figures based on certification alone.

== Release history ==
Release dates and formats
Region	Date	Edition(s)	Format(s)	Label(s)	Ref.
Japan	20 September 1997	Limited	CD	Polydor	
France	22 September 1997	Standard	CD	Mother	
United Kingdom	22 September 1997	Standard	Cassette (Note: reissued on 26 April 2019); CD; vinyl (Note: reissued on 9 March 2015)	One Little Indian	
United States	23 September 1997	Standard	Cassette; CD	Elektra	
Germany	25 September 1997	Standard	CD	Universal	
Japan	20 December 1997	Standard	CD	Polydor	
Japan	29 January 2016	Standard	Vinyl	Polydor	
Australia	17 November 2017	Standard	Vinyl	Universal	
Europe	12 August 2022	Standard	Vinyl	One Little Independent	
Australia	30 September 2022	Standard	Cassette	One Little Independent	

== See also ==
- Album era
- Experimental music
