= Yasuhiro Kobayashi =

coba
- Birth name: Yasuhiro Kobayashi
- Born: April 29, 1959 (age 65); Matsushiro, Nagano, Japan
- Occupation: Musician
- Instrument: Accordion
- Years active: 1991–present
- Website: coba-net.com

Yasuhiro Kobayashi (小林 靖宏, Kobayashi Yasuhiro, born April 29, 1959), known professionally as coba, is a Japanese musician, accordionist, composer and arranger, born in Matsushiro, Nagano and brought up in Niigata, Niigata. His music has sold over 1,000,000 CDs.

coba started playing accordion when he was nine. At the age of 18 he moved to Italy in order to hone his music skills in local educational institution and graduated with honours.

In April 1979 coba won an accordionist contest in Japan; in September he did the same in Italy and in October 1980 he was recognized as the best in Austria.

coba creates his own music and makes arrangements for famous compositions. In 1996 he collaborated with Björk recording her album Homogenic and touring in more than sixty countries. Throughout his career coba also worked with Goldie, 808 State, Underworld, Plaid and Howie B.

In 1996 French magazine Nova Magazine named "Roots" album the best one. In 2001 coba was awarded "The Best Composer of the Year" for his soundtracks according to Japanese Award Academy. In 2002 he created music for Pokémon. In 2006 coba was awarded "Voce d’oro" - the prize of "the most active accordionist in the world".

coba released more than 30 albums. He considers that his music doesn't belong to any genre.

== Website ==
- Official website
- Coba - Victoria Accordions
