= Bachelorette (song) =

1997 single by Björk

Single by Björk

from the album Homogenic
- B-side: "My Snare"; "Scary"; "Jóga"
- Released: 1 December 1997
- Studio: El Cortijo (Marbella)
- Genre: Orchestral pop • folktronica
- Length: 5:18 (album version); 5:00 (video version); 3:37 (radio edit)
- Label: One Little Indian; Mother
- Songwriters: Björk; Sjón
- Producer: Björk

Björk singles chronology
"Jóga" (1997)	"Bachelorette" (1997)	"Hunter" (1998)

Isobel song cycle singles chronology
"Isobel" (1995)	"Bachelorette" (1997)	"Oceania" (2004)

Music video
- "Bachelorette" on YouTube

"Bachelorette" is a song recorded by Icelandic singer, songwriter, and actress Björk for her third studio album, Homogenic (1997). (Note: Homogenic is officially considered to be Björk's third solo album, although technically it can be viewed as fourth if to count her 1977 juvenilia work, or fifth, counting in her 1990 jazz output Gling-Gló.) Released as its second single on 1 December 1997, the song was originally written for Stealing Beauty, a film by Bernardo Bertolucci, but the project was withdrawn. The lyrics for "Bachelorette" were written by Sjón, a friend and collaborator of the singer. The song's accompanying music video was noted for its surrealistic art direction, leading to a win at the 1998 MTV Video Music Awards.

== Music and lyrics ==
Björk wrote about the writing process of "Bachelorette" on her website:

Because I wanted the lyrics to be so epic, I got my friend Sjón – who's a poet in Iceland – to write them. We sat together at the kitchen table and drank a lot of red wine and I told him the whole story for hours and days and he wrote the words from that story.

"Bachelorette" is emotionally charged and theatrical, following Homogenic's theme of "beats and strings", but also includes instruments such as timbales, timpani, Alp horn and accordion, among others, which helped make the song stronger and more dramatic. Björk described the song's lyrical theme as "Isobel goes to the city".

== Critical reception ==
NME made the song Single of the Week, saying that it was "the most drop-dead classy thing the queen of gonk-pop" has ever done.

British magazine Music Week gave the song a rating of four out of five, describing it as "[a] big number topped by swirling strings — the most obvious single from her album."

== Music video ==
Björk in the surreal video for "Bachelorette" directed by Michel Gondry

The surreal music video for "Bachelorette" was directed by longtime Björk video collaborator Michel Gondry, produced by Midi Minuit, and is an exploration of self-reference, featuring a dramatized version of the Droste effect. It features Björk as "Bachelorette", a woman who finds a book buried in her garden that begins to write itself, describing what Bachelorette does as she describes it; the book is titled My Story. She takes the book to a publishing house named Clark Publishing, in an unspecified large city (though visible references of the location point to Chicago), and she and the publisher (played by Toby Huss) fall in love. It becomes obvious, seeing and hearing excerpts from the book, that the book tells the story of how Bachelorette found the book, travelled to meet the publisher, and fell in love with him. The book becomes incredibly popular (at one point, all of Bachelorette's fellow passengers on a subway are seen reading it), and is turned into a musical, featuring Bachelorette as herself. The musical version includes the story of the musical itself, so at some point a mini theater is shown on the stage, featuring actors dressed as a small audience. At some point later in the musical, the mini musical features an even smaller version of itself, with an even smaller stage audience. The publisher, who is in the actual audience, becomes disgusted with seeing so many versions of himself, and breaks off the relationship; later, his character in the original musical does as well. The book becomes unpopular, and the original copy begins unwriting itself. Because of this turn of events, a chain reaction occurs in the nested theatres, causing each to be nullified and revert to nature. Ultimately, the entire city devolves into the garden that appeared at the outset. The unwritten book finds its resting place buried in the ground once more, and Bachelorette ends up dancing and surrounded by wildlife.

The video was based on an original idea by Björk, who saw "Bachelorette" as a continuation of the character portrayed in "Isobel" and "Human Behaviour". The song lyrics of "Isobel" were also written by Björk's longstanding co-writer Sjón. As Gondry describes it, "this character is leaving the forest and she decides to go to the city to have a normal life. She tries her best and it doesn't work out and she comes back to the forest and she is happier there." Björk also wrote the entire story featured in the video on her website.

The art direction of the video was heavily praised. The video won the MTV Video Music Award for Best Art Direction. It was also nominated to the Grammy Award for Best Short Form Music Video at the 41st Annual Grammy Awards (1999).

== Track listings and formats ==
- UK CD1
1. "Bachelorette" (radio edit) – 3:37
2. "My Snare" (aka "Nature is Ancient") – 3:37
3. "Scary" – 2:25
4. "Bachelorette" (Howie Spread Mix) – 5:49
- UK CD2
1. "Bachelorette" (Mark Bell Optimism Mix) – 4:09
2. "Bachelorette" (Mark Bell Zip Remix) – 4:18
3. "Bachelorette" (Mark Bell Blue Remix) – 2:52
4. "Bachelorette" – 5:12
- UK CD3
1. "Bachelorette" (RZA Remix) – 5:49
2. "Bachelorette" (Alec Empire Hypermodern Jazz Remix) – 5:49
3. "Bachelorette" (Alec Empire the Ice Princess and the Killer Whale Remix) – 6:23
4. "Bachelorette" (Grooverider Jeep Remix) – 9:11
- VHS single
1. "Bachelorette" (music video) – 5:26
- European CD single
1. "Bachelorette" (radio edit) – 3:37
2. "Bachelorette" (RZA Remix) – 5:49
3. "Bachelorette" (Mark Bell Optimism Mix) – 5:49
4. "Bachelorette" (Mark Bell Zip Remix) – 4:18
5. "Bachelorette" (Mark Bell Blue Remix) – 2:52
6. "My Snare" (aka "Nature is Ancient") – 3:37
- Japanese Bachelorette / Jóga EP
1. "Bachelorette" (radio edit) – 3:37
2. "Bachelorette" (Howie Spread Mix) – 5:49
3. "Bachelorette" [Mark Bell Zip Remix] – 4:18
4. "Bachelorette" (Alec Empire Hypermodern Jazz Remix) – 5:49
5. "Bachelorette" (Grooverider Jeep Remix) – 9:11
6. "Jóga" (Buzz Water Remix) – 4:21
7. "Jóga" (Alec Empire Hardcore Mix 1) – 3:02
8. "Jóga" (Alec Empire Hardcore Mix 2) – 4:15
9. "Jóga" (album version) – 5:09
10. "Jóga" (String and Vocal Mix) – 4:25

== Charts ==
Weekly chart performance for "Bachelorette"
Chart (1997–1998)	Peak position
Australia (ARIA)	95
European Hot 100 Singles (Music & Media)	48
France (SNEP)	17
Iceland (Íslenski Listinn Topp 40)	6
Italy (Musica e dischi)	21
Netherlands (Single Top 100)	96
Scotland (Official Charts Company)	27
UK Singles (OCC)	21
UK Airplay (Music Control)	66
UK Indie (Official Charts)	2

== Release history ==
Release dates and formats for "Bachelorette"
Region	Date	Format(s)	Label(s)	Ref.
United States	10 November 1997	Alternative radio	Elektra	
France	1 December 1997	Maxi CD	Mother	
Germany	1 December 1997	Maxi CD	Mother	
United Kingdom	1 December 1997	CD1; CD2; 12-inch vinyl	One Little Indian	
United Kingdom	8 December 1997	Box set	One Little Indian	
France	6 January 1998	CD	Mother	
United Kingdom	11 May 1998 (Cancelled)	CD album	One Little Indian	
Japan	8 July 1998	Maxi CD (Note: In Japan, "Bachelorette" was released as a double A-side maxi CD single with "Jóga".)	Mother	

== Bibliography ==
- Pytlik, Mark (2003). Bjork: Wow and Flutter. ECW Press. p. 132. ISBN 1-55022-556-1.
- Ryan, Gavin (2011). Australia's Music Charts 1988–2010. Mount Martha, Victoria, Australia: Moonlight Publishing.
