= Imagina =

1986–2000 technology festival in Monaco

- Status: defunct
- Begins: 1986
- Ends: 2000
- Founder: INA
- Website: www.imagina.mc www.ina.fr/INA/Imagina

IMAGINA (originally known as International Forum of New Images) was the name of an annual festival on computer graphics (CG) and communications technology (CT) that took place from 1986 to 2000 in Monte-Carlo, Monaco. It was created by the Institut National de l'Audiovisuel (INA). The conference was sometimes compared to the CG festival part of SIGGRAPH.

The first IMAGINA festival was held in 1981, while the actual name IMAGINA was only introduced in 1986. In 1985, the Prix Pixel-INA awards were created within the framework of the IMAGINA festival. The categories have changed over the years.

In 2000, the festival was sold to the Monte-Carlo television festival, which decided to switch towards a meeting targeting professionals.
