= A Word of Science: The First and Final Chapter =

Studio album by Nightmares on Wax
- Released: 16 September 1991
- Genres: Techno; jazzstep; trip hop; jungle; drum and bass; downtempo
- Length: 60:33
- Label: Warp
- Producer: Nightmares on Wax

Nightmares on Wax chronology
A Word of Science: The First and Final Chapter (1991)	Smokers Delight (1995)

A Word of Science (subtitled The First and Final Chapter) is the debut studio album by British electronic producers Nightmares on Wax. Released by Warp Records in September 1991, it is the act's only album as a group before it became a solo vehicle for George Evelyn. Evelyn nonetheless recorded and produced the album alone, incorporating samples and elements from demo tapes he made in the late 1980s. Although Nightmares on Wax debuted with two well-received techno singles in 1989-1990, A Word of Science is eclectic and largely moves the act towards a more mellow style influenced by funk, soul and hip hop, while still incorporating techno, drum and bass, and house styles.

Upon release, A Word of Science failed to chart, but received acclaim for its fusion of disparate styles, despite alienating several listeners expecting more of the group's straightforward techno style. The album has gone on to be considered an important blueprint for the trip hop and downtempo genres that emerged in the 1990s, as well as an important milestone in electronic music intended for home listening.

== Background and production ==
Nightmares on Wax formed in the late 1980s as a DJ-based rave act inspired by hip hop. They were originally an extension of group leader George Evelyn's b-boy crew the Soul City Rockers, and featured Kevin "Boywonder" Harper. The act's first singles, "Dextrous" and "Aftermath", were highly regarded. Both released on Warp Records, the former reached number 91 on the UK Singles Chart in December 1989, whereas the latter reached number 38 in November 1990. "Aftermath" was hailed as one of the finest examples of the propulsive style of techno recorded for Warp by Yorkshire-based acts, alongside material by LFO, Sweet Exorcist and Rob Gordon. The style became known as "Yorkshire bleep," and the single is today regarded as "an iconic British chart hit."

A Word of Science was Nightmares on Wax's first album. Harper and third member Jon Halnon were not present for the production of the record, but nonetheless exerted what Electronic Beats described as "a significant influence on its composition." Evelyn has commented that he began work on the album in 1984 at age 14, a period when he began creating mixtapes with a friend. He told the Detroit Metro Times in 2014: "We'd make these mega-mixes, and use some film dialogue. We did one particular mega-mix, and somebody said that it sounds like a nightmare. That's where the name [Nightmares on Wax] came from." From 1987, Evelyn began working with a Leeds crew recording demo tapes using a 4-track recorder and sampler in his mother's living room. Elements from these demo tapes went on to appear on A Word of Science, and a compilation of tracks from the demos were later released on the compilation The NOW Experience (2016). Unlike later Nightmares on Wax albums, none of the samples on A Word of Science were officially cleared.

== Composition ==
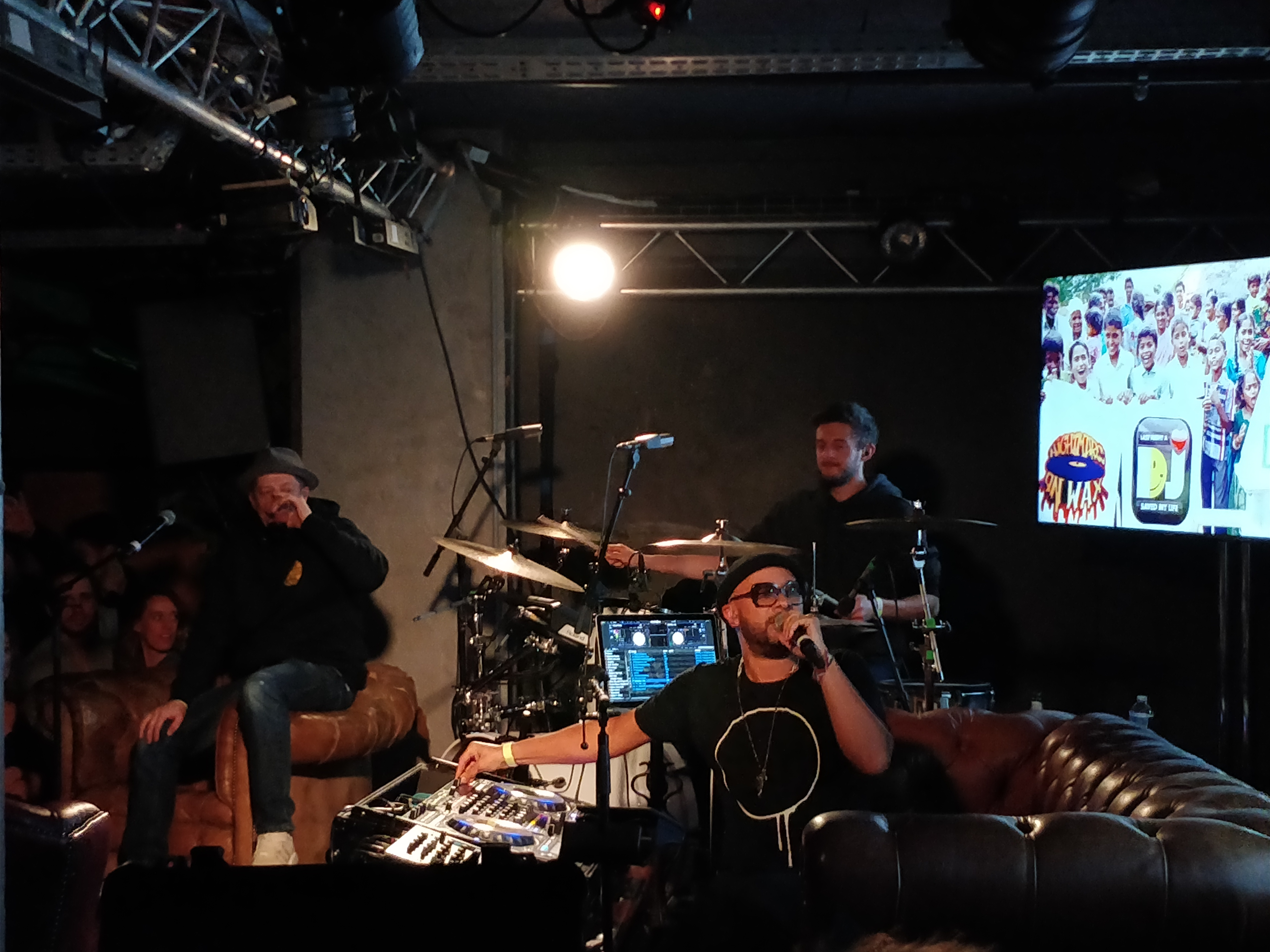
Nightmares on Wax (pictured 2008) moved towards a mellow sound influenced by funk on A Word of Science.

A Word of Science largely abandons the "bleeps and clonks" of the group's previous material in favour of mellow grooves influenced by 1970s funk, resulting in a combination of soul, funk and hip hop. Nonetheless, the group's dark, bleep techno origins surface on the bass-heavy "A Case of Funk" and the reused singles "Aftermath" and "Dextrous." Writer John Bush writes that the other tracks "expand the sound of bleep into several intriguing directions." According to Andrew Harrison of Select, the album maintains the minimalist aspect of the group's "Brit-techno" but enriches it with the funk elements and "a perverse sense of what's now possible." According to AllMusic's Sean Cooper, the record bridges electro, New York house, acid house, Detroit techno, London rave and soul with "the burgeoning eclecticism of the years to come." The record regularly changes between musical styles and tempos, and also features a heavy emphasis on bass. Although regarded as a techno album, the sound of A Word of Science has been described as a precursor to trip hop music. In Drum 'n' Bass: The Rough Guide, writer Peter Shapiro writes of the innovative style:

Eveleyn and Harper would continue to influence the future course of British dance music with their debut album, A Word of Science - The First and Final Chapter (1991). Tracks like 'Nights Interlude', 'Playtime' and the Steve Miller-sampling 'Back Into Time' were little more than audio scribbles, but their intensely doped-out atmospheres and breakbeat foundations mark them out as the foundations of Down Tempo beat collage.

"Nights Interlude" and "Biofeedback" are examples of the funk-styled downtempo style of the album, with the former track experimenting with a chill-out style, and sampling the music of Quincy Jones. Harrison described it as "smoky microfunk." "Biofeedback" and "A Case of Funk" largely consist of rhythm lines over drum tracks. The latter song was described by Shapiro as an example of Detroit techno inheriting the spirit of disco music. "Coming Down" features paranoid breakbeats and a minimalist structure. "Mega Donutz" has been described as delivering a "British spin" to the playful American hip hop style of De La Soul. "Playtime" was compared to Soul II Soul by AllMusic writer John Bush. "Back Into Time (Tick Tom)" applies dub dynamics to techno music, and samples Steve Miller. "B.W.T.M." merges the styles of human beatboxing with the techno drums of a Roland TR-808. "How Ya' Doin'" has been described as an "old-school shout-out track," and is cited by Shapiro as one of the earliest instances of jazz influencing electronic music.

== Release and reception ==
Professional ratings
Review scores
Source	Rating
AllMusic	4.5/5 stars
Encyclopedia of Popular Music	4/5 stars
Select	3/5 stars

A Word of Science was released by Warp Records on 16 September 1991, with packaging designed by The Designer's Republic. Despite not entering the UK Albums Chart, the album was nonetheless deemed successful, and received critical acclaim for its fusion of funk, soul and hip hop. It nonetheless puzzled listeners expecting more straightforward dance music like the project's prior singles. In a contemporary review, Andrew Harrison of Select warned fans of the group's "post-Northern techno house" that the album was "about as far as you can get from the muddying techno without selling your sampler." Although he found the album to be "patchy," deriding the rap songs "Mega Donutz" and "How You Doin'", he praised how the record saw Nightmares on Wax join labelmates LFO in moving techno in "another whiplash-inducing tangent."

In a retrospective review, John Bush of AllMusic wrote that A Word of Science "rivalled any other techno debuts of the time, excepting only its immediate predecessor in the Warp catalog -- LFO's Frequencies (1991)". He felt the album was "[u]njustly relegated to the history bins (and even more of a relic because of its radical differences from the later NoW catalog)," concluding that it remains "much more than just the other great early Warp LP." The Line of Best Fit noted the album's "sharp techno apexes and sudden hip-hop divots." Paul Cooper of Pitchfork reflected that the album "reveled in a warped aesthetic" and highlighted "Aftermath" as its best track, "a track so twisted and evilly looped that Second Summer of Love casualties are known to wander throughout Greater London muttering the thought-crimping vocal refrain."

== Legacy ==
"NoW's debut album, A Word of Science, was -- along with early tracks by LFO, Tuff Little Unit, and Tricky Disco -- a crucial bridge between the competing influences of New York house and electro, Detroit techno and soul, London rave and acid, and the burgeoning eclecticism of the years to come."

— Sean Cooper, AllMusic

A Word of Science earned Nightmares on Wax a reputation among techno's forward-looking innovators, and is widely regarded as creating a blueprint for 1990s trip hop music in its combination of stark rhythms with funk and hip hop rhythms. The experimental-styled downtempo hip hop and electro funk of Mike Paradinas, Spacer, Luke Vibert and others have been described by Cooper as descendants of A Word of Science. Vibe contributor Aidin Vaziri regards the album as a landmark release that "changed the face of downtempo electronica," while The Fader describes the record as a "tripped-out" precursor to the "downtempo eclecticism" characteristic of record labels Mo'Wax and Ninja Tune. Colin Helms of CMJ New Music Monthly considers the album innovative for its "hip-hop-by-way-of-techno" style. Writer Colin Larkin also cites both A Word of Science and LFO's Frequencies as the first albums to view dance music as an unexplored format for home listening, a style he felt was soon crystallised by the compilation Artificial Intelligence (1992).

Following the release, Kevin Harper left the Nightmares on Wax project to prioritise his disc jockey work. Jon Halnon also did not appear on future albums by Nightmares on Wax, rendering A Word of Science the only record by the project when it was a trio, despite neither Harper or Halnon appearing on it or touring with Nightmares on Wax in promotion of the album. The group disbanded and Evelyn began making house music for Warp subsidiary Nucleus before creating bedroom productions with Nightmares on Wax contributor Robin Taylor-Firth. Evelyn revived Nightmares on Wax as a solo act in 1995. The subsequent album Smokers Delight (1995) built upon the chill-out style of "Nights Interlude" from A Word of Science."

== Track listing ==
All tracks written by George Evelyn and Kevin Harper.

No.	Title	Length
1.	"Nights Interlude"	3:25
2.	"A Case of Funk"	5:19
3.	"Coming Down"	5:15
4.	"Stop (Crack)"	0:44
5.	"Biofeedback"	5:22
6.	"Mega Donutz"	5:12
7.	"Playtime"	4:26
8.	"Aftermath"	3:22
9.	"Fun"	4:13
10.	"Back into Time"	4:40
11.	"Dextrous"	4:04
12.	"B.W.T.M."	2:20
13.	"Sal"	6:04
14.	"E.A.S.E."	3:00
15.	"How Ya Doin'"	3:14

== Personnel ==
- Nightmares on Wax – writing, production
- The Designer's Republic – cover image
- Luke – writing
