= Warp 10: Influences, Classics, Remixes =

Music compilation by Warp

Warp 10 is a series of compilation albums issued by Warp Records in 1999 to celebrate the label's tenth anniversary. The collection spans three double CD/quadruple vinyl sets, which can be purchased individually. Each volume in the set highlights different phases of electronic music, including influential tracks not originally released by Warp, early releases from the first four years of the label's history, and the last being remixes by contemporary musicians of Warp's catalogue.

== Content ==
Three compilation albums were released to celebrate Warp's tenth anniversary. The album covers were designed by Michael Place who worked at the Designers Republic for almost nine years. Place stated he designed the covers with the idea of playing "up the famous 'Warp purple' colour, and so we came up with the idea of the colour creeping into our everyday lives." Place stated they originally had the idea actually painting objects like cars and buildings purple but found it unpractical. The photos are of locations in Sheffield and Leeds.

The second album Warp 10+2: The Classics pulls music from the first four years of the label's history containing some of their more rare and earliest tracks. The compilation compiles music that would later be referred to as bleep techno. The third album consists of indie rock and electronic musicians doing remakes of the label's back catalog. The artists who remixed the album included newer artists in 1999 such as Isan and Four Tet.

== Warp 10+1: The Influences ==
Warp 10+1: The Influences

Compilation album by Various Artists
- Released: October 12, 1999
- Genre: Chicago house, techno
- Length: 137:28
- Label: Warp

Various Artists chronology
Warp 10+1: The Influences (1999)	Warp 10+2: The Classics (1999)

Reviewing the compilation for The Independent, Laurence Phelan found Influences as "slices of musical history that every household should have if it doesn't already – Phuture's "Acid Tracks", A Guy Called Gerald's "Voodoo Ray" and the one Warp tried to sign as their first release, Unique 3's "The Theme"." Pat Blashill of Rolling Stone found the compilation "wild and often gorgeous" declaring the highlight to be the "slyly beautiful" "Voodoo Ray." Douglas Wolk of the Village Voice commented on Classics, stating that "Ten years later, a lot of it sounds like pretty average bleepity-bloopity acid house, A Guy Called Gerald's deathless "Voodoo Ray" aside." John Bush of AllMusic alternatively proclaimed that "as compilations of obscure but important techno go, this could be the best ever produced" finding that it balanced the best tracks from early Chicago, Detroit and British scenes. Bush continued that though most tracks have been anthologized several times while more obscure tracks like "Computer Madness" by Steve Poindexter. Bush concluded that the electronic music had progressed in years with groups like Autechre and Aphex Twin, "but the energy and power of mid- to late-'80s techno is undiminished with time."

=== Track listing ===
No.	Title	Credited Performer	Length
1.	"Let's Get Brutal"	Nitro Deluxe
2.	"Can U Feel It"	Mr. Fingers
3.	"Dub Love"	Master C&J
4.	"No Way Back"	Adonis
5.	"Morning After (Sunrise mix"	Fallout
6.	"The Sound (Smooth Mix)"	Reese & Santonio
7.	"Off to Battle"	Model 500
8.	"Computer Madness"	Steve Poindexter
9.	"Nude Photo"	Rhythim Is Rhythim
10.	""It's My Life" (Aluh mix)"	Da Posse
11.	"Acid Tracks"	Phuture

Disc 2

No.	Title	Credited Performer	Length
1.	"The Theme (Original Chill Mix)"	Unique 3
2.	""Let Yourself Go" (303 Mix)"	808 State
3.	"Voodoo Ray"	A Guy Called Gerald
4.	"Koro Koro"	No Smoke
5.	"Bang Bang You're Mine" (Rock Me Gently Original Radio)"	Bang the Party
6.	"My Medusa"	Kalexi Shelby
7.	"The Acid Life"	Farley Jackmaster Funk
8.	"Can't Stop (Acid Rain Forest mix)"	Plez
9.	"In a Vision"	Virgo Four
10.	""Ital's Anthem" (Trebledown/Bassup mix)"	Ital Rockers
11.	""Soul Thunder""	Juno

== Warp 10+2: Classics 89–92 ==
Warp 10+2: The Classics 1989–1992

Compilation album by Various Artists
- Released: October 12, 1999
- Genre: Bleep techno
- Length: 106:29
- Label: Warp

Various Artists chronology
Warp 10+1: The Influences (1999)	Warp 10+2: The Classics 1989–1992 (1999)	Warp 10+3: The Remixes (1999)

Wolk stated similar comments about Classics that outside of LFO and Sweet Exorcist, "the rest of it is pretty flat." Phelan called Classics as "an essential compilation that preserves the roots of the current scene" and that it "engenders a peculiar sensation of nostalgia towards that dated set of simple beeps and bleeps that sounded so revolutionary at the time." Bush found the album compilation "may not work well for those unfamiliar with the label's complete history, it's a fitting tribute to the beginning of electronic dance's move from the club floor to the living room."

In a 2013 article for Fact Magazine, Simon Reynolds noted that Warp 10+2: Classics 89–92 remains one of the only compilations that covers the "bleep techno" of the early 1990s: "[D]espite its time-defying excellence, bleep is poorly served in terms of compilations: basically, there's Warp's Classics double CD, plus out-of-print comps from the original era."

=== Track listing ===
Disc 1

Artist	Title	Warp Catalog Number
Forgemasters	"Track With No Name"	WAP1
Nightmares on Wax	"Dextrous"	WAP2
Sweet Exorcist	"Testone"	WAP3
DJ Mink	"Hey Hey! Can U Relate?"	WAP4
LFO	"LFO" (Leeds Warehouse mix)	WAP5
LFO	"Track 4"	WAP5
LFO	"Probe"	WAP5
Nightmares on Wax	"Aftermath" (LFO remix)	WAP6
Sweet Exorcist	"Testfour"	WAP3R

Disc 2

Artist	Title	Warp Catalog Number
Nightmares on Wax	"I'm For Real"	WAP6
Nightmares on Wax	"Aftermath"	WAP6
Tricky Disco	"Tricky Disco"	WAP7
The Step	"Yeah You" (Robert's mix)	WAP8R
Sweet Exorcist	"Clonk (Freebase)"	WAP9
Tuff Little Unit	"Join the Future"	WAP12
Nightmares on Wax	"A Case Of Funk"	WAP15
Coco Steel and Lovebomb	"Feel It"	WAP18
LFO vs. F.U.S.E.	"Loop"	QUICK1

The final track does not appear on the 4xLP edition, although it is listed on the sleeve.

== Warp 10+3: Remixes track listing ==
Warp 10+3: The Remixes

Compilation album by Various Artists
- Released: October 12, 1999
- Length: 153:42
- Label: Warp

Various Artists chronology
Warp 10+2: Classics 89–92 (1999)	Warp 10+3: The Remixes (1999)

Phelan found the third album in the series, Remixes as "the most interesting of these three albums" proclaiming that it "got the same blend of pure brilliance, sometimes successful avant-garde experimentalism and occasional unlistenable-to rubbish that characterises the label's output." Alternatively, Blashill found Remixes to be "proves that tinnitus-inducing artists like Labradford can turn challenging music into truly difficult listening." Bush of AllMusic found that the compilation "might be too sprawling for fans of just one or two of the acts included, Warp10+3: The Remixes is an effective statement of the electronic/dance world circa the end of the millennium."

=== Disc 1 ===
Artist	Title	Remixer
LFO / Aphex Twin	"Simon From Sydney" / "Untitled" (SAW2 CD1 TRK7)	Pram
DJ Mink	"Hey Hey! Can U Relate?"	Luke Vibert
Boards Of Canada	"Kid For Today"	Stereolab
Seefeel	"When Face Was Face"	Isan
Autechre	"Vletrmx21"	Plaid
Aphex Twin	"Untitled" (SAW2 CD1 TRK1)	Four Tet
LFO	"Nurture"	Surgeon
Sweet Exorcist	"Testone"	Winston and Ross
Nightmares on Wax	"Sal Batardes"	Autechre
Nightmares on Wax	"Playtime"	John McEntire
Broadcast	"Hammer Without A Master"	Underdog
Autechre	"EP7/Envane"	Bogdan Raczynski
Link	"Arcadian"	Mogwai

=== Disc 2 ===
Artist	Title	Remixer
Boards Of Canada	"An Eagle In Your Mind"	Push Button Objects
The Sabres of Paradise	"Wilmot"	Red Snapper
Two Lone Swordsmen	"Spine Bubbles"	Ellis Island Sound
Mike Ink	"Polka Trax 3"	Wechsel Garland
LFO	"Freeze"	Labradford
Squarepusher	"Big Loada"	Oval
Broadcast	"The Book Lovers"	Andy Votel
Aphex Twin	"Come To Daddy"	Richard Devine
Seefeel	"Air-Eyes"	Mira Calix
Sweet Exorcist	"Mad Jack"	Jimi Tenor
Tricky Disco	"Tricky Disco"	Plone
Autechre	"Characi"	Jim O'Rourke
LFO	"Tied Up"	Spiritualized

The final track was previously released on LFO's 1994 single Tied Up.
