= Carboot Soul =

Studio album by Nightmares on Wax
- Released: 12 April 1999
- Genre: Electronic; trip hop; electronica; downtempo; hip hop; nu jazz
- Length: 50:37
- Label: Warp

Nightmares on Wax chronology
Smokers Delight (1995)	Carboot Soul (1999)	DJ-Kicks: Nightmares on Wax (2000)

Singles from Carboot Soul
- 1. "Les Nuits" Released: 1999; 2. "Finer" Released: 1999

Carboot Soul is the third studio album by Nightmares on Wax. It was released in 1999 on Warp. It peaked at number 71 on the UK Albums Chart. Early copies of the album were issued with a designer packet of Rizla rolling papers, which featured the album's artwork.

The opening track and first single, "Les Nuits", is a revised version of Evelyn's tracks Nights Interlude and, subsequently, Nights Introlude, which were featured on the two previous albums respectively. The songs feature samples from the Quincy Jones version of the song Summer in the City. However, instead of using sampling and synthesized tracks like before, the song featured a full orchestral and live recording session, inspired by the samples, which was then mixed by Evelyn.

== Critical reception ==
Professional ratings
Review scores
Source	Rating
AllMusic	4.5/5 stars
Entertainment Weekly	B+
Melody Maker	4/5 stars
Muzik	5/5 stars
NME	7/10
Pitchfork	5.4/10

John Bush of AllMusic gave the album 4.5 stars out of 5, calling it "one of the best arguments yet for the continuing development of trip-hop beyond mere coffee table fare."

== Track listing ==
No.	Title	Length
1.	"Les Nuits"	6:20
2.	"Morse"	6:21
3.	"Ethnic Majority"	4:31
4.	"Jorgé"	2:29
5.	"Finer"	3:30
6.	"Ease Jimi"	5:33
7.	"Argha Noah"	7:56
8.	"Fire in the Middle"	4:17
9.	"Survival"	4:30
10.	"Capumcap"	5:10
11.	"Les Nuits - Hip Hop Reprise [Bonus Track]"	3:46
12.	"Keep On (feat. De La Soul) - Chill Mix [Bonus Track]"	5:47

The 2024 deluxe re-release of the album features two bonus tracks, a hip-hop remix of "Les Nuits", reprising its place as the opening track to close out the album. The other bonus track is titled "Keep On (feat. De La Soul) - Chill Mix", which was previously unreleased, and features a beat by Evelyn accompanied by hip-hop verses by De La Soul.

== Charts ==
Chart (1999)	Peak position
German Albums (Offizielle Top 100)	60
UK Albums (OCC)	71
