= Advance (album) =

Studio album by LFO
- Released: 29 January 1996
- Genre: Electronic music
- Length: 57:42
- Label: Warp
- Producer: Mark Bell

LFO chronology
Frequencies (1991)	Advance (1996)	Sheath (2003)

Advance is the second studio album by British electronic music duo LFO, released 29 January 1996 by Warp. The album peaked at number 44 on the UK Albums charts and was the final album to feature Gez Varley before he left the group shortly after its release. Advance was followed up with Sheath in 2003 with only contributions from Bell.

== Production ==
After the release of their album Frequencies (1991), rumors of LFO's follow-up was discussed from time to time without any new material being released. AllMusic described the album as "Nearly legendary as the album-that-almost-never-happened, Advance was a full five years in the making, with hardly a peep of new material in between." The album was produced by Mark Bell. When asked about the gap between the release dates between Advance and Sheath, he responded that "It's easy doing your first album as you have all the first part of your life to express. The second one is harder unless you’re going to repeat yourself... and repetition bores me a bit, it's a complete wasted opportunity to be creative." Tracks 1, 4, 7, 10 and 11 were recorded at LFO Studios while the other tracks were recorded at FON Studios.

Before the release of Björk's album Post (1995), Mark Bell gave her a cassette of LFO demo material allowing her to use what she wanted for a future release. Björk chose a track that would later become her song "I Go Humble". The song would show up again in instrumental form on Advance as "Shove Piggy Shove".

== Release ==
Advance was released on 29 January 1996. The album was released on vinyl, cassette, compact disc and subsequently as an internet download by Warp Records. Advance charted for one week in the United Kingdom, peaking at 44. Shane Danielsen of The Sydney Morning Herald noted the lack of notability the album had on its release in their review, stating that LFO "rarely attract headlines; who, like contemporaries Reload, have looked on as other peers (Aphex, Leftfield) grabbed the press by the throat and held on until it spluttered praise" while LFO "languished in comparative obscurity." Mark Bell and Gez Varley separated as a group shortly after the release of Advance. Varley focused on a solo career, while Bell focused on production with musicians Björk and Depeche Mode. A third LFO album was released in 2003 that was without any contributions from Varley.

== Reception ==
Professional ratings
Review scores
Source	Rating
AllMusic	4.5/5 stars
The Edge	5/5 stars
Muzik	4/5 stars
The Sydney Morning Herald	4/5 stars

From contemporary reviews, Danielsen stated that Advance was "more accessible than previous releases would allow" and that there was "enough of that mountainous speaker-juddering bass to alienate the timid" and that the group had "learnt to write songs, almost." AllMusic gave the album a favorable review of four and a half stars out of five, stating that the "result isn't as essential as their debut, but growth and maturity are evident, particularly in the focus and depth of composition."

== Track listing ==
All music is composed by Mark Bell except where noted

No.	Title	Music	Length
1.	"Advance"		5:30
2.	"Shut Down"	Mark Bell, Gez Varley	4:51
3.	"Loch Ness"		4:48
4.	"Goodnight Vienna"		3:51
5.	"Tied Up"		5:22
6.	"Them"		4:10
7.	"Ultra Schall"		4:15
8.	"Shove Piggy Shove"		4:20
9.	"Psychodelik"		5:21
10.	"Jason Voorhees"		4:34
11.	"Forever"		5:29
12.	"Kombat Drinking"	Bell, Varley	5:11

== Personnel ==
Credits adapted from Advance liner notes.

- Mark Bell – producer, engineer
- Fisch – engineer (tracks 2, 3, 8, 9 and 12)
- Gamble – engineer (tracks 5 and 6)

== See also ==
- 1996 in music
- Music of the United Kingdom (1990s)

== Notes ==
=== References ===
- Pytlik, Mark (2003). Björk: Wow and Flutter. ECW Press. ISBN 1-55022-556-1.
- Danielsen, Shane (1 April 1996). "Old into the New". The Sydney Morning Herald. p. 13.
