= Now Is the Time (Nightmares on Wax album) =

N.O.W Is the Time

Compilation album by Nightmares on Wax
- Released: 16 June 2014
- Genre: Electronic
- Length: 144:06
- Label: Warp

Nightmares on Wax chronology
Feelin' Good (2013)	N.O.W Is the Time (2014)	Shape the Future (2018)

N.O.W Is the Time is a compilation album by Nightmares on Wax. It was released via Warp on 16 June 2014, to celebrate his 25-year career of releasing music. A standard CD edition comprises 2 discs, titled Nightmares by Day and Nightmares by Night, which consists of 28 of his most popular tracks. A special edition vinyl box set includes Deep Down: Remixes & Rarities, which consists of remixes and rare tracks.

== Critical reception ==
Professional ratings
Aggregate scores
Source	Rating
Metacritic	76/100
Review scores
Source	Rating
AllMusic	4/5 stars
The Irish Times	4/5 stars
The Line of Best Fit	8.5/10
NME	3/5 stars
PopMatters	7/10 stars

At Metacritic, which assigns a weighted average score out of 100 to reviews from mainstream critics, the album received an average score of 76, based on 5 reviews, indicating "generally favorable reviews".

Jim Carroll of The Irish Times gave the album 4 out of 5 stars, describing it as "a classy round-up of the evolution of the Leeds producer's sound over a quarter century, from the bleep adventures of the early days to the hazy, smokey funk and soul of later years."

== Track listing ==
Disc 1: Nightmares by Day
No.	Title	Length
1.	"You Wish"	3:29
2.	"Mind Eye"	7:05
3.	"Argha Noah"	7:54
4.	"Calling"	7:55
5.	"Dreddoverboard"	5:48
6.	"Thinking of Omara"	5:32
7.	"Be There"	5:02
8.	"Les Nuits"	6:19
9.	"Morse"	6:20
10.	"I Am You (Live in Chicago)"	4:09
11.	"Passion"	3:25
12.	"Give Thx"	3:33

Disc 2: Nightmares by Night
No.	Title	Length
1.	"195 Lbs"	5:35
2.	"70s 80s"	5:30
3.	"Flip Ya Lid"	5:24
4.	"Be, I Do"	4:47
5.	"(Man) Tha Journey"	6:20
6.	"Now Is the Time"	3:59
7.	"Bless My Soul"	5:56
8.	"Da Feelin"	4:41
9.	"African Pirates"	6:23
10.	"Mega Donutz"	5:12
11.	"Mission Venice"	2:50
12.	"Dextrous"	4:03
13.	"Aftermath"	3:20
14.	"I'm for Real"	5:20
15.	"Set Me Free (Piano Dub)"	5:03
16.	"Nights Interlude"	3:25

Deep Down: Remixes & Rarities
No.	Title	Length
1.	"Dextrous (JD Twitch Optimo Remix)"	6:01
2.	"Biofeedback (Morgan Geist Remix)"	6:20
3.	"A Case of Funk (Loco Dice Remix)"	7:11
4.	"Aftermath (LFO Remix)"	4:37
5.	"Aftermath (Special Request Redux)"	7:53
6.	"Aftermath (Acid Mondays Remix)"	7:41
7.	"Burn Me Slo" (featuring OC)	4:47
8.	"Keep On (86 in It Mix)" (featuring De La Soul)	5:29
9.	"Gambia via Vagator Beach (Mr Scruff Remix)"	5:04
10.	"Survival Dub"	4:35
11.	"Hiyaself"	4:32
12.	"Da Mess Sticks"	4:43
13.	"Da Feelin (Hungry Ghost Remix)"	4:33
14.	"Now Is the Time (Ashley Beedle Warbox Dubplate Special)"	5:38

== Charts ==
Chart (2014)	Peak position
Belgian Albums (Ultratop Flanders)	140
UK Independent Albums (OCC)	25
