= Forgemasters (band) =

British electronic music act

Forgemasters was a British electronic music act composed of Robert Gordon, Winston Hazel and Sean Maher. Their 1989 single "Track with No Name" was the first release by Warp Records and helped define the sound of Warp and bleep techno.

== History ==
Robert Gordon, Sean Maher and Winston Hazel were colleagues in the FON record shop and studio in Sheffield. Gordon was an engineer at FON Studio and co-founder of Warp Records. The name Forgemasters was taken from a local heavy engineering firm, Sheffield Forgemasters.

Their single "Track with No Name" was the first release by Warp Records. It was of a techno subgenre, the primarily Sheffield-based bleep techno, and written in four hours one evening at Gordon's home studio. Dave Simpson, writing in Fact in 2012, described it as "driven by an eerie pulse, a sound which would soon be called a 'bleep' and become the distinctive signature of hardcore northern techno and, for its first two years, the sound of Warp." Matt Anniss, writing for Resident Advisor in 2014, called it "one of the defining records of the era".

== Discography ==
=== Singles and EPs ===
- "Track with No Name" (Warp, 1989) – released in association with Outer Rhythm
- The Black Steel E.P. (Network, 1991)
- Quabala EP (Hubba Hubba, 1992)

=== Singles with contributions by Forgemasters ===
- "Network Retro #8: Back 2 Back Classics" (Network, 1993) – "Somebody New" by MK* / "Track with No Name (Communique Mix)" by Forgemasters

=== Compilation album appearances ===
- Pioneers of the Hypnotic Groove (Warp, 1991) – includes "Track with No Name".
- Warp 10: Influences, Classics, Remixes – Warp 10+2: Classics 89–92 (Warp, 1999) – includes "Track with No Name"
- Rob Gordon Projects by Rob Gordon (Source, 1996) – includes "Clap Your Hands", "Metalic" [sic] and "Presence"

=== Remixes ===
- "Man Machine (Cyber - Subsonik) mix", Man Machine (Outer Rhythm, 1989) – "Man Machine (Cyber - Subsonik)" and "Man Machine (Elektro - Genetik)" mixed by Forgemasters
- "15 Inches+" (Rebuilt by Forgemasters) – The Wad (Earth, 1997). Included on 7 Hills Clash – Rebuilt EP
- "Commercial Rain (Rub-A-Dub Mix)" – Inspiral Carpets (Mute, 1990). Included on "Commercial Rain"/"She Comes in the Fall (Remixes)"

== See also ==
- Nightmares on Wax
- Sweet Exorcist
- Tricky Disco
