= Sheath (album) =

Studio album by LFO
- Released: 22 September 2003
- Genre: IDM
- Length: 46:47
- Label: Warp
- Producer: Mark Bell

LFO chronology
Advance (1996)	Sheath (2003)

Singles from Sheath
- 1. "Freak" Released: 25 August 2003

Professional ratings
Aggregate scores
Source	Rating
Metacritic	73/100
Review scores
Source	Rating
AllMusic	4/5 stars
Alternative Press	4/5 stars
Dotmusic	8/10
Mojo	3.5/5 stars
The Observer	5/5 stars
Pitchfork	7.3/10
Playlouder	4/5 stars
Q	3.5/5 stars
Stylus	B
Uncut	7/10

Sheath is the third and final studio album by British IDM project LFO. It was released by Warp on 22 September 2003. It peaked at number 27 on the UK Independent Albums Chart.

== Critical reception ==
At Metacritic, which assigns a weighted average score out of 100 to reviews from mainstream critics, Sheath received an average score of 73/100 based on 13 reviews, indicating "generally favorable reviews".

John Bush of AllMusic gave the album 4 stars out of 5 and called Mark Bell "the most imaginative producer in British techno." Dominique Leone of Pitchfork gave the album a 7.3 out of 10, writing, "Bell's strength seems to reside in his softer sides that fools me into thinking his more extroverted outings are lacking."

Paul Sullivan of BBC wrote, "the album manages to re-capture some of the original pioneering spirit that made Frequencies such a tour-de-force." Joshua Klein of Billboard said, "The drum machines sound delightfully (if deceptively) rinky-dink, and the absence of vocalists keeps the focus on the beats and occasionally cacophonous sonic clutter."

== Track listing ==
No.	Title	Length
1.	"Blown"	6:02
2.	"Mum-Man"	3:40
3.	"Mokeylips"	4:02
4.	"Snot"	2:55
5.	"Moistly"	4:12
6.	"Unafraid to Linger"	4:35
7.	"Sleepy Chicken"	3:58
8.	"Freak"	4:13
9.	"Mummy, I've Had an Accident..."	5:02
10.	"Nevertheless"	3:50
11.	"Premacy"	3:22

Japanese edition bonus tracks
No.	Title	Length
12.	"Millionaire Dogs"	1:53
13.	"Butterslut"	5:00

== Uses in media ==
The track “Freak” is notable for being featured on the opening credits for Gaspar Noé’s 2009 film Enter the Void and David Slade’s 2005 film Hard Candy.

== Charts ==
Chart	Peak position
UK Independent Albums (OCC)	27
