= WARP10 =

WARP10 May refer to:

- Windows Advanced Rasterization Platform, a piece of software written by Microsoft.
- Warp 10: Influences, Classics, Remixes, a series of compilation albums released by Warp Records.
