= Shape the Future =

Studio album by Nightmares on Wax
- Released: 26 January 2018
- Genre: Electronic
- Length: 53:01
- Label: Warp

Nightmares on Wax chronology
Now Is the Time (2014)	Shape the Future (2018)	Shout Out! To Freedom... (2021)

Singles from Shape the Future
- 1. "Citizen Kane" Released: 2017

Shape the Future is the eighth studio album by Nightmares on Wax. It was released in 2018 on Warp. It peaked at number 19 on the UK Independent Albums Chart.

== Critical reception ==
Professional ratings
Aggregate scores
Source	Rating
Metacritic	71/100
Review scores
Source	Rating
AllMusic	3.5/5 stars
Exclaim!	7/10
The Line of Best Fit	6.5/10
MusicOMH	4/5 stars
PopMatters	7/10 stars
Resident Advisor	3.1/5
The Skinny	4/5 stars
Spectrum Culture	2.25/5

At Metacritic, which assigns a weighted average score out of 100 to reviews from mainstream critics, the album received an average score of 71, based on 9 reviews, indicating "generally favorable reviews".

Paul Carr of PopMatters gave the album 7 out of 10 stars, calling it "N.O.W's strongest and most cohesive album since the imperious In a Space Outta Sound." Katie Hawthorne of The Skinny gave the album 4 out of 5 stars, writing, "You'll feel like you've heard these songs on the breeze before, or snatched them from the window of a passing car, but you couldn't have caught them without Nightmares on Wax's expert navigation."

== Track listing ==
No.	Title	Length
1.	"Back to Nature" (featuring Kuauhtli Vasquez and Wixarika Tribe)	7:36
2.	"Tell My Vision" (featuring Andrew Ashong)	4:14
3.	"Shape the Future"	6:18
4.	"On It Maestro"	4:15
5.	"Tomorrow" (featuring LSK)	4:30
6.	"Typical" (featuring Jordan Rakei)	4:40
7.	"Tenor Fly"	2:41
8.	"Citizen Kane" (featuring Mozez)	4:00
9.	"Deep Shadows" (featuring Sadie Walker)	3:57
10.	"Gotta Smile"	6:44
11.	"The Other Ship"	4:07

Digital edition bonus track
No.	Title	Length
12.	"Citizen Kane (Rap Version)" (featuring Allan Kingdom and Mozez)	4:09

Japanese CD edition bonus tracks
No.	Title	Length
12.	"World Inside" (featuring Andrew Ashong)	9:06
13.	"Citizen Kane (Rap Version)" (featuring Allan Kingdom and Mozez)	4:09

== Charts ==
Chart (2018)	Peak position
Belgian Albums (Ultratop Flanders)	132
UK Independent Albums (Official Charts)	19
