= Mind Elevation =

Studio album by Nightmares on Wax
- Released: 2 September 2002
- Genre: Electronic
- Length: 59:57
- Label: Warp

Nightmares on Wax chronology
DJ-Kicks: Nightmares on Wax (2000)	Mind Elevation (2002)	Late Night Tales: Nightmares on Wax (2003)

Singles from Mind Elevation
- 1. "Know My Name" Released: 2002; 2. "70s 80s" Released: 2003; 3. "Date with Destiny" Released: 2003

Mind Elevation is the fourth studio album by Nightmares on Wax. It was released in 2002 on Warp. It peaked at number 47 on the UK Albums Chart.

== Critical reception ==
Professional ratings
Aggregate scores
Source	Rating
Metacritic	65/100
Review scores
Source	Rating
AllMusic	3/5 stars
The Guardian	3/5 stars

At Metacritic, which assigns a weighted average score out of 100 to reviews from mainstream critics, the album received an average score of 65, based on 13 reviews, indicating "generally favorable reviews".

== Track listing ==
No.	Title	Length
1.	"Mind Eye"	7:05
2.	"Say-Say"	4:39
3.	"Thinking of Omara"	5:33
4.	"Date with Destiny"	5:11
5.	"Bleu My Mind"	3:50
6.	"Environment"	3:54
7.	"Soul-Ho"	1:45
8.	"Humble"	3:22
9.	"70s 80s"	5:32
10.	"Know My Name"	4:33
11.	"BBH (Bongo-Brk-Haven)"	6:10
12.	"Mirrorball"	1:16
13.	"Thoughts"	7:07

== Charts ==
Chart (2002)	Peak position
French Albums (SNEP)	133
German Albums (Offizielle Top 100)	49
UK Albums (OCC)	47
US Top Dance Albums (Billboard)	20
