= Feelin' Good (Nightmares on Wax album) =

Studio album by Nightmares on Wax
- Released: 16 September 2013
- Genre: Electronic
- Length: 46:56
- Label: Warp
- Producer: George Evelyn

Nightmares on Wax chronology
Thought So (2008)	Feelin' Good (2013)	Now Is the Time (2014)

Feelin' Good is the seventh studio album by Nightmares on Wax. It was released in 2013 on Warp. It peaked at number 24 on the Billboard Top Dance/Electronic Albums chart.

== Critical reception ==
Professional ratings
Aggregate scores
Source	Rating
Metacritic	65/100
Review scores
Source	Rating
AllMusic	2.5/5 stars
Clash	7/10
Consequence of Sound	D−
Exclaim!	8/10
Fact	3/5
MusicOMH	3.5/5 stars
Resident Advisor	4.0/5

At Metacritic, which assigns a weighted average score out of 100 to reviews from mainstream critics, the album received an average score of 65, based on 12 reviews, indicating "generally favorable reviews".

== Track listing ==
No.	Title	Length
1.	"So Here We Are"	4:27
2.	"Be, I Do"	4:47
3.	"Master Plan"	4:01
4.	"Luna 2"	4:52
5.	"Now Is the Time"	4:00
6.	"Give Thx"	3:33
7.	"Eye (Can't See)"	4:11
8.	"Tapestry"	5:28
9.	"There 4U"	4:40
10.	"Om Sweet H(Om)e"	6:57

== Charts ==
Chart (2013)	Peak position
UK Dance Albums (OCC)	21
UK Independent Albums (OCC)	33
US Top Dance Albums (Billboard)	24
