= Mark Bell (British musician) =

British DJ, record producer

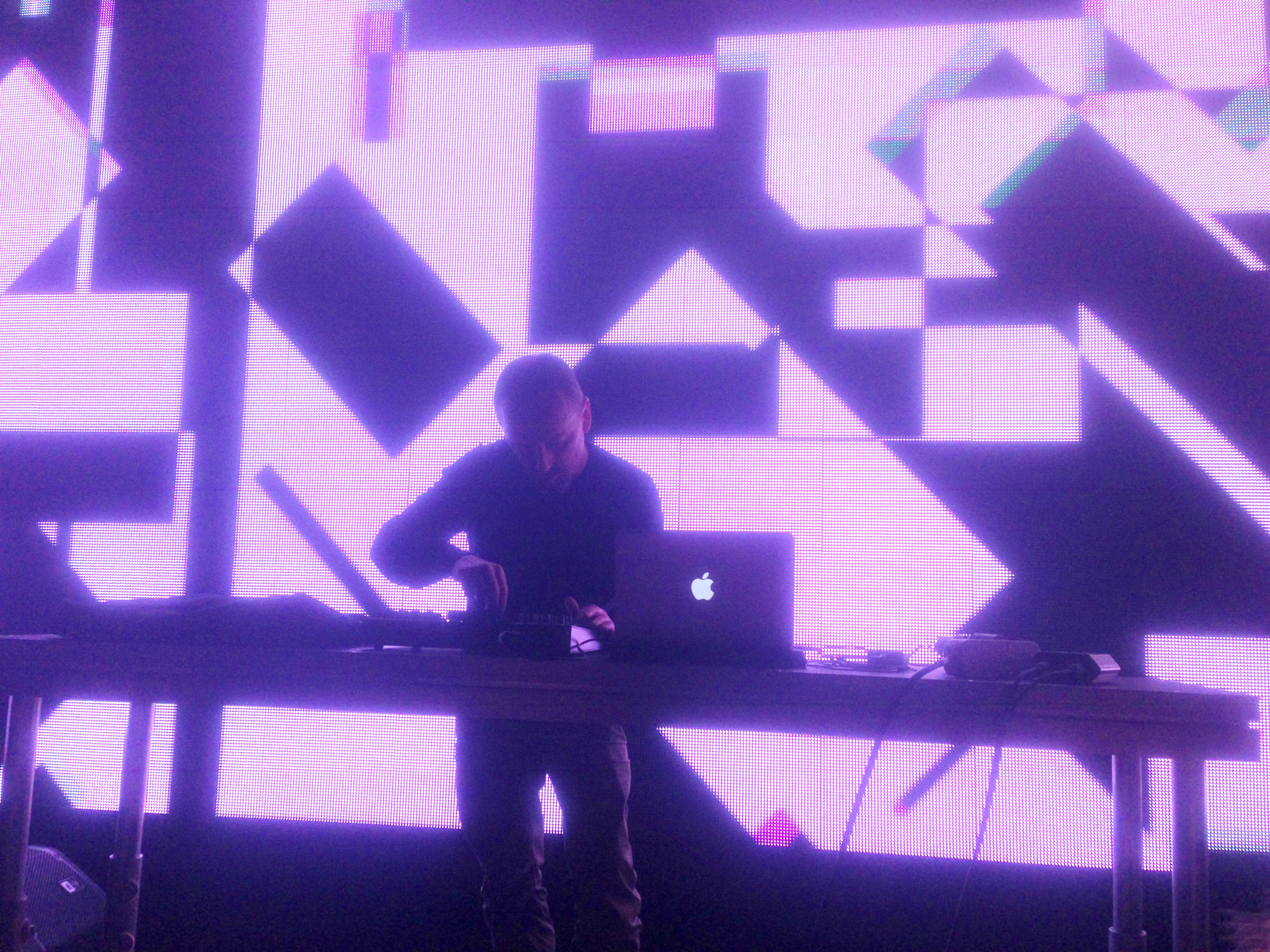
- Mark Bell on stage in Arma 17, Moscow, on 30 March 2013

Background information
- Born: 22 February 1971
- Died: 8 October 2014 (aged 43) Wakefield, Yorkshire, England
- Occupations: DJ; record producer
- Instruments: Synthesizer; turntables
- Years active: 1988–2014
- Label: Warp

Mark Bell (22 February 1971 – 8 October 2014) was a British DJ, record producer, and member of the pioneering techno group LFO. He recorded on Warp Records, and also collaborated with artists such as Björk and Depeche Mode.

== Biography ==
=== Early life ===
Mark Bell's early musical influences came from three specific sources. One was an art teacher in school who taught art and played music by Jean-Michel Jarre and Kraftwerk, an older sister who played disco, funk music and electro from her bedroom, and a music shop in Leeds Mark described as having "arcade games like Tempest and Defender" and that it would play "loads of early hip hop like Schoolly D. I remember feeling this is mine and my friend’s place". Bell's first experiments in electronic music involved him making a deal with his girlfriend's father who made his musical ballads listened to despite disliking them. Bell convinced him he required a real backing band and purchased his drum machine from him.

Bell went to college to study photography and graphic design, where he met the West Yorkshire DJ Martin Williams and Gez Varley. With money from Varley's grandmother, Bell had access to a bedroom full of equipment. In 1988, Varley, Bell and Martin began to play gigs as LFO, named after the low frequency oscillator, a function of many synthesizers.

=== LFO ===
LFO were performing at the Warehouse, a club in Leeds, when Steve Beckett and Rob Mitchell arrived and noticed the positive reception club goers had to the track "LFO". Beckett and Mitchell were the original creators of the Warp record label, but had not officially created the label yet. Despite this, Beckett and Mitchell offered to put out a 12-inch single, which was expected to sell about 2,000 copies but eventually became a Top 20 hit. The label released their first studio album Frequencies in 1991. Following the album's release, Bell continued to release singles for other independent labels such as Carl Craig's Planet E.

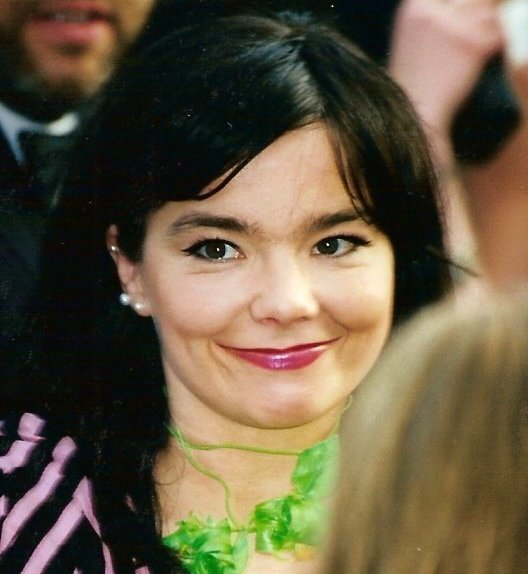
Mark Bell would perform production duties on all of Björk's albums between Homogenic and Biophilia.

While working on a follow-up album, Bell began his partnership with Björk before the release of her album Post. Bell gave her a cassette of LFO demo material allowing her to use what she wanted for a future release. Björk chose a track that would later become her song "I Go Humble", which would show up again in instrumental form as "Shove Piggy Shove" on the LFO album Advance in 1996. When asked about the long gap between records, Bell stated “It’s not intentional...It's easy doing your first album as you have all the first part of your life to express. The second one is harder unless you're going to repeat yourself... and repetition bores me a bit, it's a complete wasted opportunity to be creative." After the release of Advance, Bell and Varley parted ways, with Bell retaining rights to the name LFO. Bell continued to perform under the LFO moniker.

Bell released one more LFO album, Sheath in 2003.

=== Production work ===
Bell worked on almost every Björk album until Biophilia in 2011.

Björk had initially wanted Bell to contribute to her albums Debut and Post, however, he started a real collaboration with her on the album Homogenic. Bell was credited for the majority of the album's production, including the songs "Pluto", "Alarm Call", and the bassline in "Jóga". Björk stated that she "trusts and respects what [Bell] does for me. If I were to say who has influenced me most it would be Stockhausen, Kraftwerk, Brian Eno and Mark Bell".

Bell would also produce Björk's Selmasongs, the soundtrack to the Lars von Trier's film Dancer in the Dark.

Bell also produced Depeche Mode's Exciter. Bell commented that he found working with the group fun but strange, stating he had listened to the group when he was 12 and found the band asking him for days off or for "what they should eat".

=== Other collaborations ===
Other collaborations included contributing to Deltron 3030's self-titled album.

=== Death ===
Bell died on 8 October 2014 at the age of 43. His death was reported on 13 October 2014 due to complications after surgery.

== Select discography ==
=== Albums ===
- Surge (R&S, 1996), as Speedjack

=== Singles ===
- 1994 "Storm", as Speedjack
- 1994 "C.T.C.", as Speedjack
- 1994 "Blue Bossa". as Speedjack
- 1995 "Lofthouse", as Clark
- 1995 Klip EP, as Fawn
- 1996 "Jigsaw", as Counterpoint

=== Production ===
- 1997 Björk – Homogenic
- 2000 Björk – Selmasongs
- 2001 Paul Oakenfold - Perfecto Presents Ibiza
- 2001 Depeche Mode – Exciter
- 2004 Björk – Medúlla
- 2005 Björk – Drawing Restraint 9
- 2007 Björk – Volta
- 2011 Björk – Biophilia
- 2012 Björk – Bastards

=== Composer ===
- 2003 Underworld - Back to Mine
- 2008 Björk – Declare Independence

== General references ==
- "Music producer Mark Bell of LFO has died, label confirms". The Guardian. 14 October 2014.
- "LFO's Mark Bell, Electronic Music Pioneer and Crucial Warp Signee, Dies at 43". Vice.com. 13 October 2014.
- "Mark Bell dead: Long-time Bjork collaborator and member of electronic". The Independent. 14 October 2014.
- "LFO's Mark Bell dies - The Wire". The Wire Magazine - Adventures In Modern Music.
- "Mark Bell, electronic music pioneer, dies aged 43". BBC News. 14 October 2014.
- "Music world reacts to death of LFO's Mark Bell". NME. 14 October 2014.
- Stedman, Alex (13 October 2014). "Mark Bell, Bjork Producer and Member of LFO, Dies".
- "Remembering Mark Bell: His Top 10 Productions". Billboard.
- Pytlik, Mark (2003). Björk: Wow and Flutter. ECW Press. ISBN 1-55022-556-1.
