= Smokers Delight =

Studio album by Nightmares on Wax
- Released: 25 September 1995
- Recorded: 1995
- Studio: Fon Studios (Sheffield, England); T.T.B. Studios (Wakefield, England); Touchwood Studios (Leeds, England)
- Genre: Trip hop; jazzstep; breakbeat; chill-out; electronica; downtempo
- Length: 72:28
- Label: Warp
- Producer: E.A.S.E.

Nightmares on Wax chronology
A Word of Science: The First and Final Chapter (1991)	Smokers Delight (1995)	Carboot Soul (1999)

Smokers Delight is the second studio album by English DJ and record producer Nightmares on Wax. It was released in 1995 on Warp in the United Kingdom, and on Wax Trax in the United States. It peaked at number 84 on the UK Albums Chart.

== Critical reception ==
Professional ratings
Review scores
Source	Rating
AllMusic	4/5 stars
Muzik	4.5/5
Q	4/5 stars

Smokers Delight was included in Robert Dimery's 1001 Albums You Must Hear Before You Die book in 2005. In 2015, Fact placed it at number 15 on the "50 Best Trip-Hop Albums of All Time" list.

== Track listing ==
No.	Title	Length
1.	"Nights Introlude"	4:40
2.	"Dreddoverboard"	5:48
3.	"Pipes Honour"	9:05
4.	"Me + You"	0:56
5.	"Stars"	6:59
6.	"Wait a Minute/Praying for a Jeepbeat"	2:44
7.	"Groove St."	7:29
8.	"Time (To Listen)"	0:29
9.	"(Man) Tha Journey"	6:19
10.	"Bless My Soul"	5:56
11.	"Cruise (Don't Stop)"	7:05
12.	"Mission Venice"	2:50
13.	"What I'm Feelin (Good)"	2:26
14.	"Rise"	5:14
15.	"Rise (Reprise)"	1:46
16.	"Gambia Via Vagator Beach"	4:41
17.	"Aquaself [Bonus Track]"	6:16
18.	"Let's Ascend [Bonus Track]"	6:43
19.	"Dreddoverboard - Funk Mix [Bonus Track]"	6:43
20.	"Nights Introlude - Live in Chicago [Bonus Track]"	7:00

For the digital deluxe re-release, two bonus tracks are added to the album, titled "Aquaself" and "Let's Ascend". A funk remix of "Dreddoverboard", as well as a live version of "Nights Introlude" from a Chicago DJ set/concert by Evelyn, are also added to the album's deluxe bonus disk.

== Charts ==
Chart (1995)	Peak position
UK Albums (OCC)	84

Chart (2020)	Peak position
Scottish Albums (OCC)	26
German Albums (Offizielle Top 100)	75
