= Thought So =

Studio album by Nightmares on Wax
- Released: 26 August 2008
- Genre: Electronic
- Length: 62:58
- Label: Warp

Nightmares on Wax chronology
In a Space Outta Sound (2006)	Thought So (2008)	Feelin' Good (2013)

Singles from Thought So
- 1. "195lbs" Released: 2008

Thought So (sometimes stylized as thought so...) is the sixth studio album by Nightmares on Wax. It was released in 2008 on Warp. It peaked at number 19 on the Billboard Top Dance/Electronic Albums chart.

== Critical reception ==
Professional ratings
Aggregate scores
Source	Rating
Metacritic	57/100
Review scores
Source	Rating
AllMusic	3.5/5 stars
The Guardian	2/5 stars
MusicOMH	3/5 stars
Pitchfork	4.7/10

At Metacritic, which assigns a weighted average score out of 100 to reviews from mainstream critics, the album received an average score of 57, based on 6 reviews, indicating "mixed or average reviews".

== Track listing ==
No.	Title	Length
1.	"Intro"	0:38
2.	"Da Feelin"	4:42
3.	"195lbs"	5:35
4.	"Be There"	5:02
5.	"Bringin It"	6:03
6.	"Calling"	8:02
7.	"Moretime"	5:21
8.	"Pretty Dark"	4:43
9.	"Hear in Colour"	4:20
10.	"Still? Yes!"	3:39
11.	"Hey Ego!"	5:24

Thought So... – digital (bonus track)
No.	Title	Writer(s)	Producer(s)	Length
12.	"Betcha"	Evelyn Taylor-Firth	Evelyn Taylor-Firth	4:45

== Charts ==
Chart (2008)	Peak position
French Albums (SNEP)	187
UK Dance Albums (OCC)	10
UK Independent Albums (OCC)	13
US Top Dance Albums (Billboard)	19
