= Love Is the Message =

Love Is the Message may refer to:

- Love Is the Message (MFSB album) or the title song, 1973
- "Love is the Message", 1991 song by British techno group LFO from their album Frequencies
- Love Is the Message (Misia album), 2000
- "Love Is the Message" (Pose), 2018 television episode
- Love Is the Message, The Message Is Death, 2016 film by Arthur Jafa
