= Bleep techno =

Music subgenre

- Other names: Yorkshire bleep; Sheffield bleep; bleep and bass
- Stylistic origins: Detroit techno; Chicago house; electro; dub; reggae; hip hop; acid house; industrial; chiptune; video game music
- Cultural origins: Late 1980s, Yorkshire
- Typical instruments: Drum machine; analogue synthesizer
- Derivative forms: UK garage; UK bass; dubstep; bassline house

Bleep techno (or simply bleep) is a regional subgenre of techno which developed in the late 1980s in Northern England, particularly Yorkshire. Named after its minimalistic synthesizer sounds, bleep techno combined influence from American techno and house with electro elements and heavy sub-bass inspired by reggae sound system culture. The style was commercially successful between 1989 and 1991, and became associated with artists on the Sheffield label Warp Records. It has been characterized as the first unique British style of electronic dance music.

== Style ==
Bleep techno is a sparse, cold subgenre of techno primarily defined by minimalistic electro-style synthesizer tones (the eponymous "bleeps") and heavy sub-bass inspired by dub and reggae sound systems. The genre's short, melodic synthesizer tones have resemblance to futuristic science fiction noises, chiptune/video game music, or pocket calculator sounds. In addition to aspects of Detroit techno and Chicago house, the style also commonly featured hip hop elements and breakbeat-inspired drum machine patterns, combining acid house's hypnotic pull with "skippy syncopation" that presaged jungle. Tracks often featured clean, precise beats and deep Roland TR-808 bass. Roland TR-909 drum machines with syncopation are frequently used.

== History ==
In the 1980s, the burgeoning British rave music scene was influenced largely by American house and techno records—music which came from cities like Chicago, Detroit, and New York. Original UK tracks were generally considered second-rate at that time. However, this changed with the release of 1988 single "The Theme" by Bradford-based group Unique 3—music characterized as the first bleep techno single owing to its unprecedented blend of Chicago house with elements of hip hop and reggae. The track featured deep sub-bass with "bleepy melodies, shuffling TR-909 rhythms and weird synth tones."

Following the release of "The Theme", a wave of artists in cities like Sheffield, Leeds, Leicester, and Birmingham began making music inspired by this new sound. The newly founded Warp Records became the subgenre's most prominent label in 1989, with artists such as Sweet Exorcist, Forgemasters, LFO, and Nightmares on Wax becoming important figures in the style. Warp's first release was Forgemasters' "Track With No Name", funded by the UK's Enterprise Allowance Scheme, a grant meant to help unemployed youths start businesses. LFO's eponymous single reached no. 12 in the UK charts in 1990. Between 1989 and 1991, bleep techno would serve as one of England's most popular rave styles.

The Warp compilation Warp 10+2: Classics 89–92, released in 1999, contains much of the label's early bleep material.

== Legacy ==
Bleep techno is recognized as the first distinctive electronic dance music scene to emerge in Britain. According to author and DJ Matt Anniss, it would become the immediate foundation of the UK's bass music tradition, influencing many later subgenres. Additionally, he suggested that it represented a continuation of Sheffield's electronic music and industrial heritage, including acts such as the Human League, Heaven 17, and Cabaret Voltaire (whose member Richard H. Kirk co-founded the bleep group Sweet Exorcist). Critic Simon Reynolds noted its influence on styles such as UK garage, dubstep, and bassline house in addition to contemporary artists such as Rustie and Neil Landstrumm.

== See also ==
- Warp Records
