= In a Space Outta Sound =

Studio album by Nightmares on Wax
- Released: 7 March 2006
- Genre: Electronic
- Length: 62:58
- Label: Warp

Nightmares on Wax chronology
Late Night Tales: Nightmares on Wax (2003)	In a Space Outta Sound (2006)	Thought So (2008)

Singles from In a Space Outta Sound
- 1. "The Sweetest" Released: 2006; 2. "Flip Ya Lid" Released: 2006; 3. "African Pirates" Released: 2006

In a Space Outta Sound is the fifth studio album by Nightmares on Wax. It was released in 2006 on Warp. It peaked at number 93 on the UK Albums Chart.

== Critical reception ==
Professional ratings
Aggregate scores
Source	Rating
Metacritic	64/100
Review scores
Source	Rating
AllMusic	3.5/5 stars
MusicOMH	4/5 stars
Pitchfork	6.8/10
PopMatters	6/10 stars

At Metacritic, which assigns a weighted average score out of 100 to reviews from mainstream critics, the album received an average score of 64, based on 13 reviews, indicating "generally favorable reviews".

== Track listing ==
No.	Title	Length
1.	"Passion"	7:00
2.	"The Sweetest"	5:24
3.	"Flip Ya Lid"	5:24
4.	"Pudpots"	3:42
5.	"Damn"	7:38
6.	"You Wish"	3:30
7.	"Deepdown"	6:19
8.	"Chime Out"	1:08
9.	"Me!"	5:56
10.	"I Am You"	6:42
11.	"Soul Purpose"	3:50
12.	"African Pirates"	6:25

== Charts ==
Chart (2006)	Peak position
UK Albums (OCC)	93
US Top Dance/Electronic Albums (Billboard)	12

== Certifications ==
Certifications for In a Space Outta Sound
Region	Certification	Certified units/sales
New Zealand (RMNZ)	Gold	7,500^{‡}
^{‡} Sales+streaming figures based on certification alone.
