= DJ-Kicks: Nightmares on Wax =

Compilation album by Nightmares on Wax
- Released: October 2, 2000
- Genre: Hip hop, downtempo
- Length: 76:47
- Label: Studio !K7 !K7093CD
- Producer: Nightmares on Wax

Nightmares on Wax chronology
Carboot Soul (1999)	DJ-Kicks: Nightmares on Wax (2000)	Mind Elevation (2002)

DJ-Kicks chronology
Stereo MCs (2000)	Nightmares on Wax (2000)	Trüby Trio (2001)

Professional ratings
Review scores
Source	Rating
Allmusic	4/5 stars
Pitchfork	5.5/10

DJ-Kicks: Nightmares on Wax is a DJ mix album, mixed by Nightmares on Wax, released on the Studio !K7 label as part of the DJ-Kicks series.

- CD Cat number: !K7093CD
- Vinyl Cat number: !K7093LP

== CD Track List ==
1. Type - Slow Process – 5:04
2. Only Child - Breakneck – 2:13
3. Saukrates - Ay, Ay Studder – 3:20
4. DJ Paul Nice - Break It Down – 2:05
5. Grand Unified - Shake Up (Jaddle Remix) – 4:05
6. Nightmares on Wax - Ease Jimi – 2:06
7. Jerry Beeks - Flash $ – 1:56
8. D.I.T.C. - Thick – 3:44
9. Nightmares on Wax - Burn Me Slow (featuring O.C. of D.I.T.C.) – 1:57
10. Nightmares on Wax - Play On (featuring Corrina Joseph) – 4:36
11. Kenny Dope - Get On Down – 4:50
12. Kenny Dope - Superkat – 3:09
13. A Tribe Called Quest - Award Tour – 3:23
14. John Cameron - Swamp Fever – 2:04
15. Blackalicious - Alphabet Aerobics – 2:09
16. DJ Trax - This Place – 4:50
17. Freddie Fresh - It's A Latin Thing – 5:44
18. Aim - Underground Crownholders – 1:48
19. Deckwrecka - Catchwrecka – 2:07
20. Martin Brew - Sand Steppin – 2:25
21. Smokers Blend - Overooped – 3:35
22. Deadbeats - Pick Me Up – 4:06
23. Syrup - Chocolate – 5:21

== LP Track List ==
1. Saukrates - Ay, Ay Studder
2. Jerry Beeks - Flash $
3. D.I.T.C. - Thick
4. Nightmares on Wax - Play On
5. Nightmares on Wax - Burn Me Slo
6. A Tribe Called Quest - Award Tour
7. Freddy Fresh - It's A Latin Thing
8. Deckwrecka - Catch Wrecka
9. Martin Brew - Sand Steppin'
10. Smokers Blend - Overooped
11. Deadbeats - Pick Me Up
12. DJ Paul Nice - Break It Down
