= Unique 3 =

English rave band

- Origin: Bradford, England
- Genres: Rave; bleep techno
- Years active: 1988–present

Unique 3 are an English rave band from Bradford, Yorkshire. Formed in 1988, they pioneered the 'bleep techno' sound. Their song "The Theme" captured this sound, and it later appeared in remixed form on the Chemical Brothers' compilation album, Brothers Gonna Work It Out. Their most commercially successful record was "Musical Melody", which reached number 29 on the UK Singles Chart in April 1990 and led to a performance on Top of the Pops.

== Discography ==
=== Albums ===
- Jus' Unique (10, 1990)
- Invasive Signals (Fat!, 2007)

=== Singles ===
Year	Song	UK
1989	"The Theme"	61
1990	"Musical Melody" / "Weight for the Bass"	29
1990	"Rhythm Takes Control"	41
1991	"No More"	—
1991	"Activity"	—
1993	"Open Up Your Mind"	—
2007	"Rocks the Bass"	—
2011	"Shades of Grey"	—
2012	"Serial Killer"	—
2016	"Reconnoitre"	—
"—" denotes releases that did not chart.
