= LFO (British band) =

British electronic band

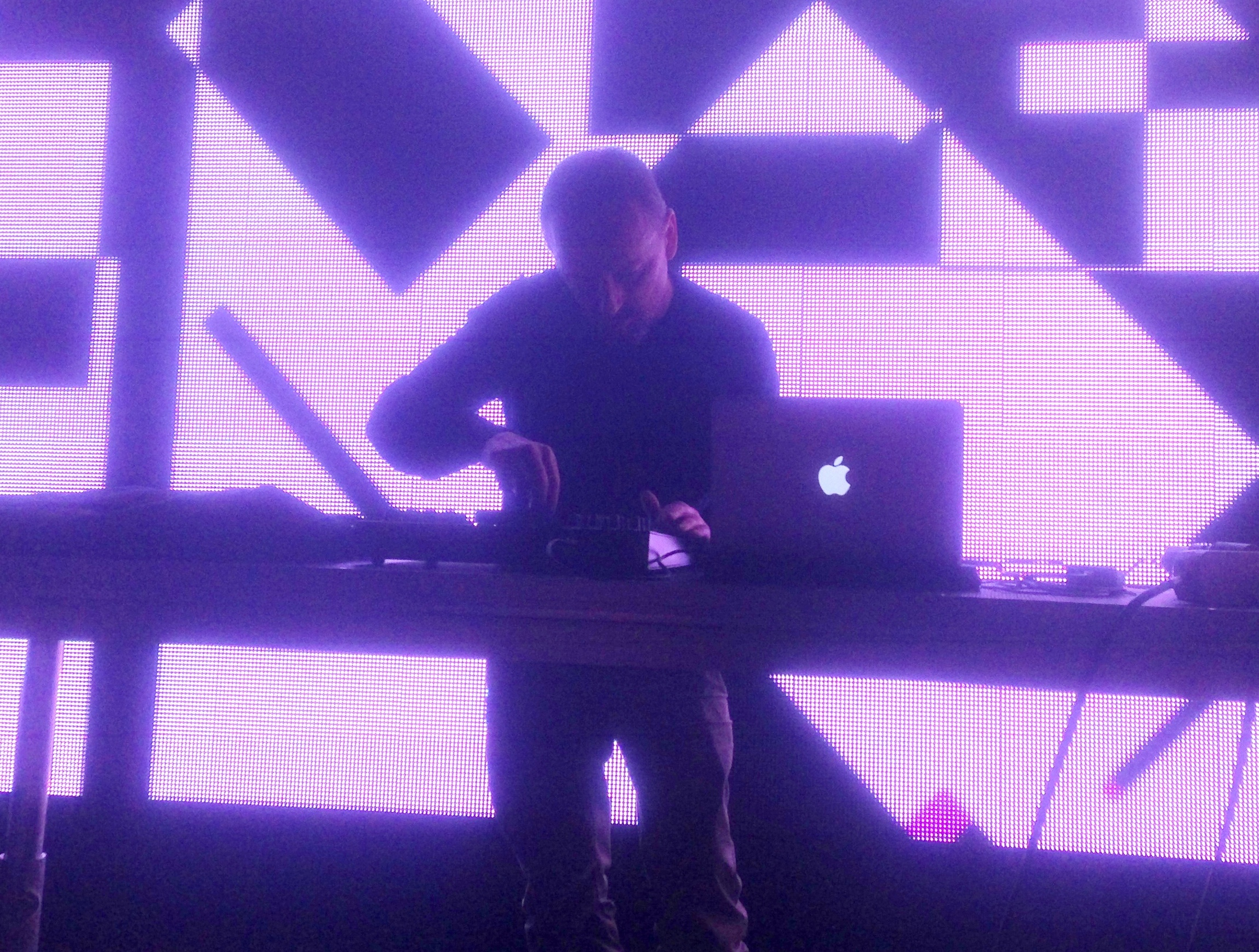
- Mark Bell performing solo as LFO in Moscow, 2013

Background information
- Origin: Leeds, England
- Genres: Techno; bleep techno; IDM
- Years active: 1988–1996; 2003–2014
- Labels: Tommy Boy; Warner Bros. (US); Warp
- Past members: Gez Varley; Mark Bell
- Website: LFO at Warp

LFO was a British electronic music act formed in 1988 consisting of Mark Bell and Gez Varley. They released their debut LP Frequencies in 1991 on Sheffield label Warp. After Varley left the group in 1996, Bell continued solo to release Advance (1996) and Sheath (2003). Bell died in October 2014, ending the project.

LFO are considered to be pioneers of the bass-heavy "bleep techno" style. AllMusic called them "one of British techno's most important, agenda-setting groups."

== History ==
=== Early years ===
Varley and Bell met while studying at Leeds and named their group after the initialism for the common synthesizer function low-frequency oscillation. They gave their first track, "LFO", to Nightmares on Wax. The popularity of the demo in clubs led to the track being released by the Sheffield-based Warp label in 1990, and it was a Top 20 hit in the U.K., reaching number 12 in the singles charts in July.

DJ Martin (Martin Williams) is credited as a cowriter and co-producer of "LFO" but was not a member of the group. Mark Bell explains:

We gave a tape of our recordings to DJ Martin who helped loads with arranging our tracks so it'd work on the dancefloor. We'd just been messing around with drum machines since we were like thirteen, tapping away at them like they were arcade games, making tapes to play our mates at school. Anyway, DJ Martin would play our cassettes in his sets and people would go mental - in a good way - cos they were totally raw.

The duo of Bell and Varley were both 19 years old when they recorded their debut album, Frequencies (1991). According to Bell, most of the album was made by him alone because Varley felt "trapped by the confines of Warp" and wanted to make more direct dance music; the credits were nonetheless split 50/50.

The duo later signed to Tommy Boy Records in the U.S. and remixed Afrika Bambaataa's "Planet Rock", as well as songs from Björk, Radiohead, Depeche Mode, Laurent Garnier, and The Sabres of Paradise.

=== Later years ===
In 1996, LFO released their second album, Advance. Varley left the group in 1997 after the Advance album and formed the group Feedback with Simon Hartley (a.k.a. Wild Planet). Bell produced Homogenic (1997) with Björk and performed with her on her 1997 Homogenic and 2007/08 Volta tours. He also produced Exciter (2001) with Depeche Mode.

In 2003, LFO released their third album, Sheath, produced alone by Bell.

In 2005, LFO and Aphex Twin split an untitled 12" EP credited variously to LFO / AFX or AFX / LFO.

In 2009 the Warp20 (Recreated) compilation featured covers of two early LFO songs, "LFO" by Luke Vibert and "What is House? (LFO Remix)" by Autechre. The original version of "LFO", albeit the Leeds Warehouse Mix, featured on Warp's 10th anniversary album Warp 10+2: Classics 89–92.

LFO's track "Freak" was used in the opening title sequence for Gaspar Noé's 2009 film Enter the Void.

In 2014, Bell died from health complications at the age of 43, resulting in the disbandment of the band.

== Discography ==
=== Albums ===
- Frequencies (1991) – No. 42 UK
- Advance (1996) – No. 44 UK
- Sheath (2003)

=== EPs ===
- What Is House? EP (1992) – No. 62 UK

=== Singles ===
- "LFO" (1990) – No. 12 UK
- "Love is a Message" (1990)
- "Loop" (1990)
- "Frequencies" (1991)
- "We Are Back" (1991) – No. 47 UK
- "Tied Up" (1994) – No. 99 UK
- "Freak" (2003) – No. 79 UK
