= Gez Varley =

British electronic musician and DJ

Gerrard Varley is a British electronic musician and DJ, who was member of LFO during the 1990s and later released his solo works under the moniker G-Man.

== Life ==
Varley founded LFO in 1990 with Mark Bell, whom he had known since 1984. Their first release LFO was released by Warp Records in 1990 and reached the British single charts.

During the mid-1990s Varley focused on his solo productions. His debut album Kushti was released in 1996 as G-Man. In the same year Varley left LFO. He released music on his own imprint G Records as well as on the German labels Studio K7 and Force Inc. Music Works.

In 1999 Varley moved to Wiesbaden, Germany. In 2000, he founded the label GMR Records.

== Discography ==
=== Albums ===
- 1996: G-Man – Kushti (swim ~)
- 1998: Gez Varley – Gez Varley presents Tony Montana (Studio K7)
- 1999: G-Man – Beautiful (i220)
- 2001: Gez Varley – Bayou Paradis (Force Inc. Music Works)
- 2002: G-Man – Avanti (Force Inc. Music Works)
- 2002: David Morley / Nodern / Gez Varley – Personal Settings 2 (Quatermass)
- 2007: G-Man Aka Gez Varley – La Collection (GMR)

=== Singles and EPs ===
- 1995: G-Man – G-Man (swim ~)
- 1996: G-Man – G-Man II (swim ~)
- 1997: Gez Varley – Gez Varley presents Tony Montana (Studio K7)
- 1998: G-Man – IV (G)
- 1999: G-Man – Quo Vadis / El Jem (i220)
- 1999: G-Man – Beautiful (i220)
- 1999: G. Varley – G6 & 7 (Overdrive)
- 2000: G-Man – Spik (i220)
- 2000: G-Man – Knight Trax Volume One (G-Man)
- 2000: Gez Varley – Free Fall (Episode)
- 2001: G-Man – Knight Trax Volume Two (G-Man)
- 2001: Gez Varley – Violator (Force Inc. Music Works)
- 2002: G-Man – Avanti (Force Inc. Music Works)
- 2005: G-Man – Graphite (Defrag Sound Processing)
- 2006: G-Man – Quo Vadis (Remixes) (i220)
- 2006: G-Man – The Way You Move (Wir)
- 2006: Gez Varley – Shon EP (Keys Of Life)
- 2007: G-Man – Quo Vadis (Styrax Leaves)
- 2008: Gez Varley – G 11 (Persistencebit)
- 2009: Gez Varley – Jan Traxs (GMR)
- 2011: Pod / G-Man - Styrax Special (Styrax)
- 2011: G-Man & Nadja Lind - G-Catz EP (Lucidflow)
- 2011: Heckmann vs G-Man - Drive Inn EP (Acid Fuckers Unite)
- 2012: GMAN & MRI - Confusion EP (Resopal Schallware)
- 2012: G-Man + Rob Strobe - Acrophobia EP (Sonic Groove)
- 2014: G-MAN "Cosmic Shores" (BangBang)
