= Frequencies (LFO album) =

Studio album by LFO
- Released: 22 July 1991
- Recorded: 1990–1991
- Genre: Techno; bleep techno; acid house; IDM
- Length: 54:42
- Label: Warp
- Producer: LFO; Martin Williams

LFO chronology
Frequencies (1991)	Advance (1996)

Frequencies is the debut studio album by British electronic music duo LFO, released on 22 July 1991 by Warp. It peaked at No. 42 on the UK Albums Chart and was released to universal acclaim.

== Background ==
Warp originally signed LFO in 1990 after DJ Martin played their tracks at Leeds Warehouse. The duo were both 19 years old when they recorded their debut LP. According to Mark Bell, most of the album was made by him alone because Gez Varley felt "trapped by the confines of Warp" and wanted to make more direct dance music; the credits were nonetheless split equally.

== Release ==
Frequencies was originally released by Warp in the United Kingdom, while it was later released by Tommy Boy Records in the United States. The US edition of the album alters the track listing slightly, inserting "Track 14", which concludes the UK edition, in between "We Are Back" and "Tan Ta Ra"; the rest of the tracks then proceed in the same order as the UK edition.

"LFO", "We Are Back", and "What Is House? (LFO Remix)" (an expanded version of "Intro") were released as singles.

== Critical reception ==
Professional ratings
Review scores
Source	Rating
AllMusic	5/5 stars
Clash	8/10
Mojo	4/5 stars
NME	8/10
State	5/5
Uncut	5/5 stars

In 2006, Frequencies was listed by The Observer as one of the "50 albums that changed music".

In 2012, Fact placed Frequencies at number 47 on its list of the 100 best albums of the 1990s. In a 2013 article for Fact, critic Simon Reynolds called Frequencies "one of electronic dance music's All Time Top 5 Albums".

Mixmag included Frequencies in its 2018 list of the 50 most influential dance music albums of all time.

== Legacy and influence ==
In 2009, the Warp20 (Recreated) compilation featured covers of "LFO" and "What Is House? (LFO Remix)" by Luke Vibert and Autechre, respectively.

Friendly Fires selected Frequencies for inclusion in a 2015 NME list of "cult classic" albums compiled by musicians and NME writers.

In 2021, Squarepusher said that hearing the track "LFO" was instrumental in him becoming more interested in electronic music, as he was struck by the track's futurist sound and use of bass.

== Track listing ==
All tracks are written by Mark Bell and Gez Varley, except "LFO" by Mark Bell, Gez Varley, and Martin Williams.

No.	Title	Length
1.	"Intro"	2:24
2.	"LFO"	3:26
3.	"Simon from Sydney"	5:05
4.	"Nurture"	4:40
5.	"Freeze"	3:56
6.	"We Are Back"	4:45
7.	"Tan Ta Ra"	4:29
8.	"You Have to Understand"	4:04
9.	"El Ef Oh!"	3:49
10.	"Love Is the Message"	3:45
11.	"Mentok 1"	4:17
12.	"Think a Moment"	3:27
13.	"Groovy Distortion"	3:28
14.	"Track 14"	2:57
Total length:		54:42

== Charts ==
Chart (1991)	Peak position
UK Albums (Official Charts)	42
