= Sweet Exorcist (band) =

British music duo

- Origin: Sheffield, England
- Genres: Bleep techno, IDM
- Years active: 1990–1994
- Labels: Warp; Touch; Plastex
- Spinoff of: Cabaret Voltaire
- Past members: Richard Barratt; Richard H. Kirk

Sweet Exorcist were a British music duo consisting of Richard Barratt, also known as DJ Parrot, and Richard H. Kirk. They were among the flagship bleep techno acts on Warp Records in the late 1980s.

== History ==
Sweet Exorcist, which was named after a Curtis Mayfield track, was the project of Sheffield-based musicians Richard H. Kirk (Cabaret Voltaire) and Richard ‘DJ Parrot’ Barratt (later a member of All Seeing I).

Kirk and Barratt knew each other since the mid-1980s. Barratt had already supported a Cabaret Voltaire tour of the UK in 1986. By 1989, Cabaret Voltaire had wrapped up a contract with EMI and had effectively stopped working together. Kirk passed the time by going to clubs and working in the studio with Barratt, who at the time was running Sheffield's main club night, Jive Turkey.

After both worked on several tracks together, Barratt suggested making a club track with studio test tones. In January 1990, the tracks were released as "Testone" on Warp. It defined the bleep techno sound, by making playful use of sampled sounds from Yellow Magic Orchestra's Computer Game (1978) and the film Close Encounters of the Third Kind (1977). The next release was "Clonk", also on Warp. For both singles, remix versions were released.

In 1991, the duo released an album, entitled C.C.E.P on vinyl and C.C.C.D on CD, it was the first album released by Warp Records. The band followed this up with the album Spirit Guide to Low Tech on Touch Records, released in 1994.

2011 saw the release of the compilation album RetroActivity on Warp containing remixes for both singles as well as the tracks such as "Clonk" and "Clonks Coming."

== Discography ==
=== Albums ===
- 1991: C.C.C.D. (Warp)
- 1994: Spirit Guide to Low Tech (Touch Records)
- 2011: RetroActivity (compilation album; Warp).

=== Singles & EPs ===
- 1990: "Testone" (Warp)
- 1990: "Testone Remixes" (Warp)
- 1990: "Clonk" (Warp)
- 1990: "Per Clonk (Remix)" (Warp)
- 1991: "Popcone" (Plastex)
