= Nightmares on Wax =

English DJ

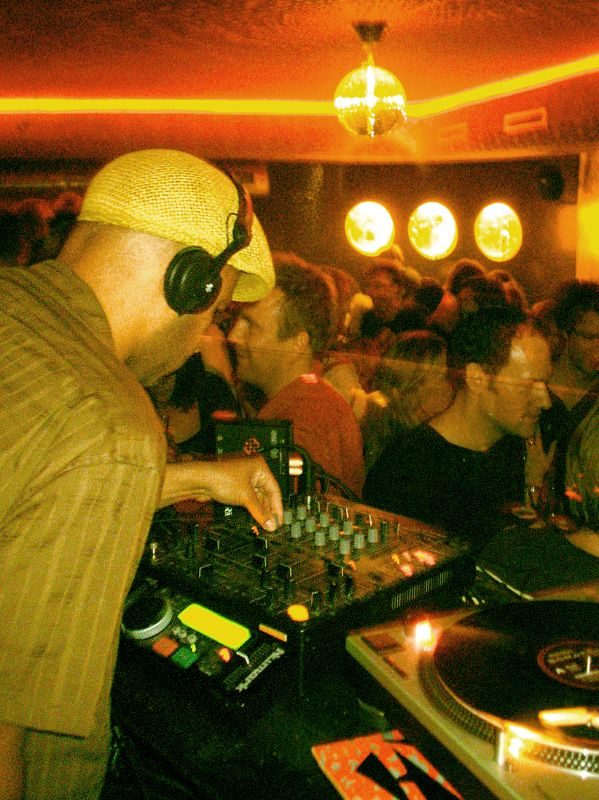
- Nightmares on Wax performing in 2006

Background information
- Also known as: DJ E.A.S.E.
- Born: George Herbert Evelyn; 15 January 1970 (age 56); Leeds, England
- Genres: Trip hop; downtempo
- Occupations: DJ; record producer
- Years active: 1988–present
- Labels: Warp; Wax On
- Members: George Evelyn
- Past members: John Halnon; Kevin Harper
- Website: nightmaresonwax.com

George Herbert Evelyn (born 15 January 1970), better known by his stage name Nightmares on Wax or DJ E.A.S.E., is an English DJ and record producer from Leeds. His music has been released by Warp Records. He is based in Ibiza. Nightmares on Wax was originally a group consisting of Evelyn and John Halnon, and then later with Kevin Harper.

== Early life ==
George Evelyn was born in Leeds. His father and sister introduced him to the soul music of Quincy Jones and Curtis Mayfield. Later, he was fascinated by hip hop tracks such as "Rapper's Delight" and "Buffalo Gals".

== Career ==
Nightmares on Wax was originally formed in 1988 by George Evelyn as a group project with John Halnon, and later with Kevin Harper. Their debut studio album, A Word of Science: The First and Final Chapter, was released on Warp in 1991. After the release of the album, Harper left the group to pursue a career in DJing. Robin Taylor-Firth became a frequent collaborator with Evelyn.

The second studio album for Warp, titled Smokers Delight, was released in 1995. It was placed at number 15 on Fact's "50 Best Trip-Hop Albums of All Time" list. Evelyn released Carboot Soul in 1999, and Mind Elevation in 2002. In 2005, Evelyn started his own record label Wax On.

He released In a Space Outta Sound in 2006, Thought So in 2008, Feelin' Good in 2013, Shape the Future in 2018, and Shout Out! To Freedom... (2021)

== Discography ==
=== Studio albums ===
- A Word of Science: The First and Final Chapter (1991)
- Smokers Delight (1995)
- Carboot Soul (1999)
- Mind Elevation (2002)
- In a Space Outta Sound (2006)
- Thought So (2008)
- Feelin' Good (2013)
- Shape the Future (2018)
- Shout Out! To Freedom... (2021)
- Echo45 Sound System (2025)

=== Compilation albums ===
- Now Is the Time (2014)

=== DJ mixes ===
- DJ-Kicks: Nightmares on Wax (2000)
- Late Night Tales: Nightmares on Wax (2003)
- Coming Home (2009)
- Wax Da Beach (2011)
- Back to Mine (2019)

=== EPs ===
- A Case of Funk (1991)
- Still Smokin... (1996)
- Sound of N.O.W. (2000)
- Ground Floor (2016)

=== Singles ===
- "Dextrous" (1989)
- "Aftermath #1" (1990)
- "Set Me Free" (1992)
- "Happiness!" (1992)
- "Alive" (1994)
- "DreddOverBoard" (1996)
- "Finer" (1999)
- "Les Nuits" (1999)
- "Keep On" (2000)
- "Know My Name" (2002)
- "70s 80s" (2003)
- "Date with Destiny" (2003)
- "Brothers on the Slide (Dub)" (2003)
- "Flip Ya Lid" (2006)
- "The Sweetest" (2006)
- "195lbs" (2008)
- "Citizen Cane" (2017)
- "Back to Nature" (2017)
