= Warp Records =

British independent record label

Warp Records Limited
- Founded: 1989; 37 years ago
- Founder: Steve Beckett; Rob Mitchell; Robert Gordon
- Distributor: FUGA
- Genre: Electronic; IDM; techno; experimental; indie rock
- Country of origin: United Kingdom
- Location: Sheffield (1989–2000); London (2000–present)
- Official website: warp.net

Warp Records is a British independent record label founded in Sheffield in 1989 by Steve Beckett, Robert Mitchell and Robert Gordon. It specialises in electronic, indie rock and experimental music by acts including Aphex Twin, Autechre, Boards of Canada, Squarepusher, Broadcast, Brian Eno, Flying Lotus, Battles and Grizzly Bear.

Warp began as a record shop in 1987 and released its first record, "Track With No Name" by Gordon's band Forgemasters, in 1989. In the early 1990s, Warp became associated with the UK bleep scene, releasing music by acts such as LFO, Sweet Exorcist and Nightmares on Wax. Warp prioritised albums and artist longevity over releasing singles by short-lived acts. Its 1992 compilation Artificial Intelligence helped establish intelligent dance music, a genre of electronic music intended for home listening rather than dancing.

Gordon left in 1991 and Mitchell died in 2001, leaving Beckett as the head. Warp moved to London in 2000. Over the following decade, it expanded its roster to include rock, hip-hop, film soundtracks, neoclassical music and ambient music. In 2001, Warp established a film production company, Warp Films, initially to release films by Chris Cunningham and Chris Morris. In 2004, Warp launched Bleep, one of the first download stores.

Warp is associated with experimental electronic music but has influenced artists of other genres, such as the rock band Radiohead. Publications such as The Independent, The Guardian and Resident Advisor described it as one of the most influential and respected independent labels. In 2017, Beckett received the Pioneer Award at the AIM Independent Music Awards.

== History ==
=== 1980s record shop origins ===
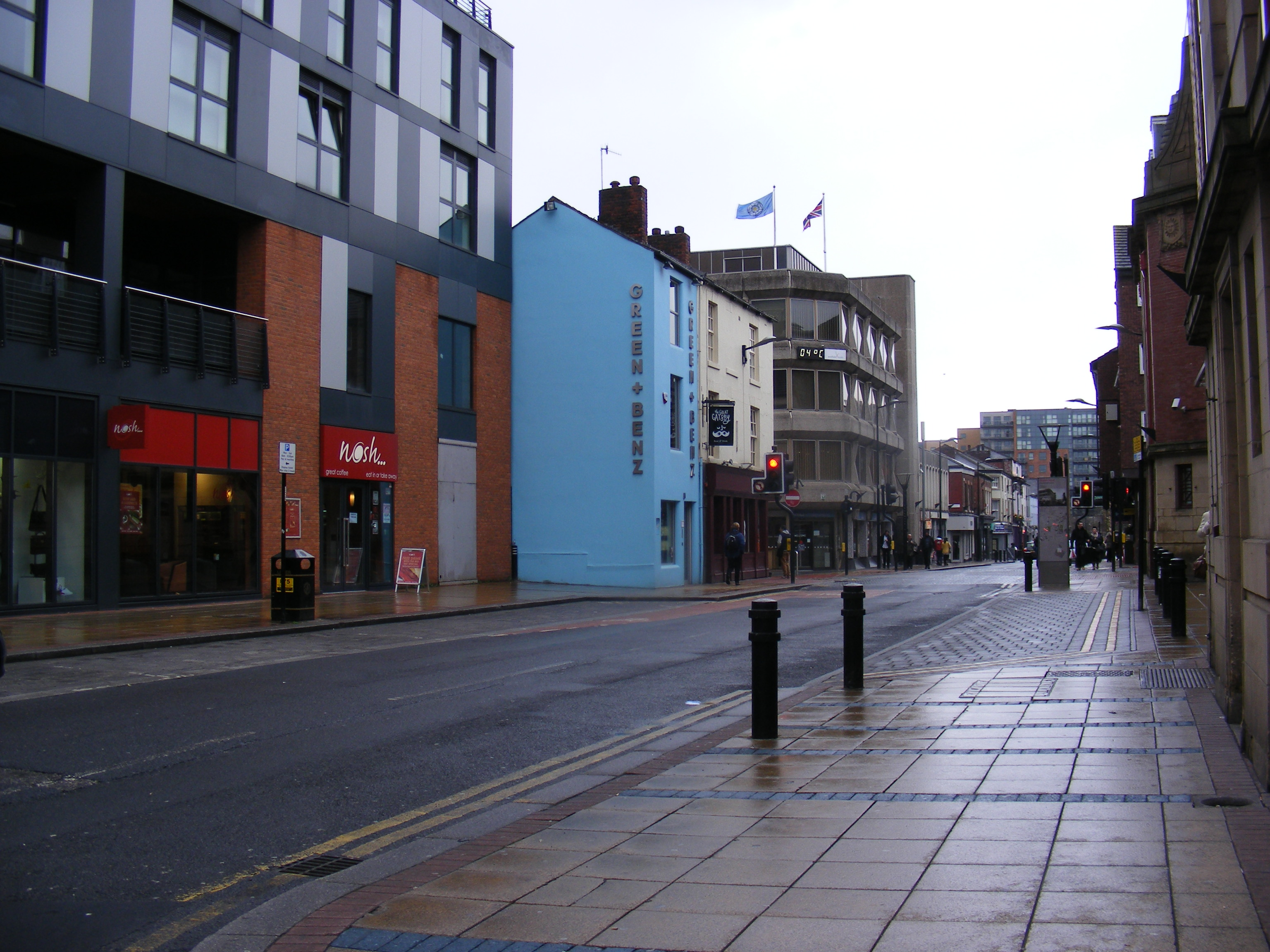
Division Street, Sheffield, the site of the Warp Records shop (1987—1997)

In the mid-1980s, Steve Beckett and Rob Mitchell, then in their early twenties, were active in the music scene of Sheffield in Northern England. Sheffield's steel manufacturing was in decline, and abandoned warehouses were being used for illegal raves as part of the growing subculture of club music and acid house. Sheffield had produced electronic bands including the Human League, Heaven 17 and Cabaret Voltaire.

Beckett and Mitchell worked at FON, a record store on Division Street that was a focal point of Sheffield's music scene. According to Beckett, it mainly sold indie and alternative records before expanding to imported Chicago house records. Beckett had a background in indie rock, and discovered electronic music while working in FON. FON also operated a recording studio used by artists such as David Bowie, Yazz and Chakk.

In 1987, Beckett and Mitchell partnered with the Sheffield musician and producer Robert Gordon to refit FON as Warp Records, funded by selling tickets for events at the University of Sheffield. They originally named it Warped Records, but this was difficult to hear over a telephone. It specialised in imports released by American dance labels such as Transmat, Metroplex, Trax Records and Underground Resistance, which sold out quickly.

=== First singles and bleep ===
Mitchell and Beckett felt there was a market for dance music created by Sheffield musicians, which they felt "sounded fresher" than music being created in the US. In 1989, Warp released its first single, "Track With No Name" by Gordon's band Forgemasters. Financed through a grant from the government's Enterprise Allowance Scheme, they pressed 500 white label copies and distributed them to shops around the UK by car, selling out in a week.

Beckett conceived Warp as a northern independent label similar to Factory Records, sharing 50% of their profits with artists. The Sheffield company Designers Republic created Warp's logo and distinctive purple record packaging. According to Resident Advisor, the packaging became "instantly recognisable in an age when dance music was becoming increasingly disposable". DMY described it as "at one moment garish and brutal, the next pristine and beautiful". Beckett said they did not necessarily think they were creating a record label and instead wanted to see if they could "have an effect". However, the market was larger than they expected.

In 1990, Warp released successful dance singles by acts including Nightmares on Wax, LFO, Sweet Exorcist and Tricky Disco. The singles received attention from the influential BBC DJ John Peel. Warp became associated with bleep, a "minimal, funky" subgenre of techno emerging in Sheffield. Resident Advisor described bleep as a "distinctly British mutation of techno that married the weighty sub-bass of 'steppers' reggae with the rush of rave culture and futuristic vision of Detroit techno". Beckett connected bleep to the advent of music technology such as samplers and software such as Logic, and said its sound evoked the Sheffield steelworks: "You'd almost see sparks and hear anvils clanging." The journalist Richard King described bleep as "an evocation of the nocturnal energy of an industrial city in decline, whose empty, industrial spaces were being turned into illegal and autonomous party zones".

Jarvis Cocker, a member of the Sheffield band Pulp, created music videos for Warp acts between 1990 and 1993. Warp created an imprint, Gift Records, to release records by pop and rock acts including Pulp. After releasing some early Pulp singles, Gift closed after Pulp signed to Island Records.

=== Album focus ===
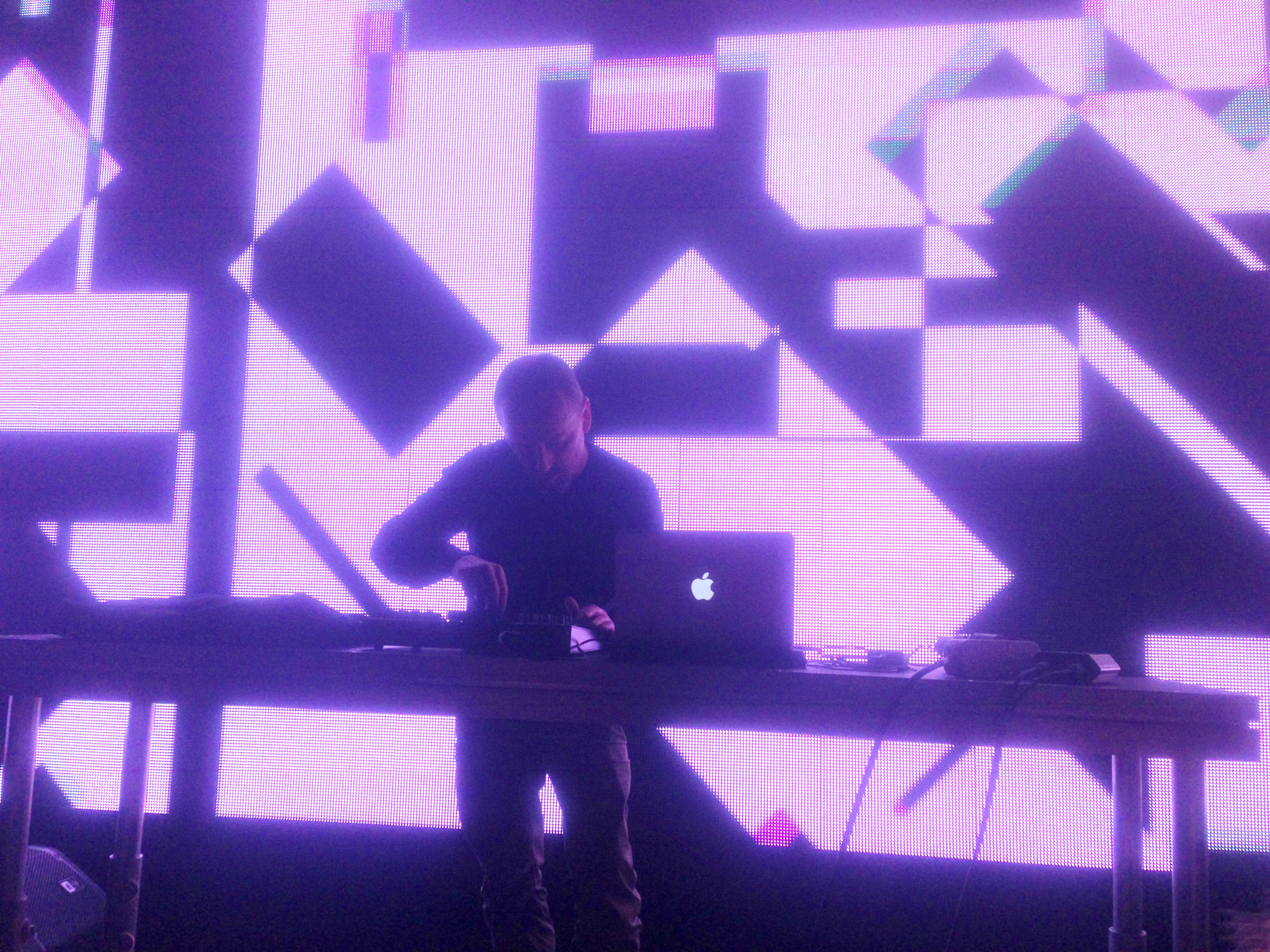
LFO performing in 2013. The LFO album Frequencies (1991) was a "turning point" for Warp and saved them from bankruptcy.

Warp signed a deal with the London label Rhythm King to distribute records. Beckett and Mitchell regretted the deal, as it did not grant them royalties. Coming close to bankruptcy, they signed a new distribution deal with Pinnacle Entertainment. Warp resolved to remain independent and focus on building artists and longevity with albums rather than releasing singles by short-lived acts. Mitchell said many dance acts struggled with the album format: "There's a big difference between a compilation album and an album you put on and don't take off until the final track's played, which is what we're after doing." They also elected not to release rave music, which was popular at the time. Beckett said this bolstered Warp's reputation for ignoring convention.

In 1991, Warp released its first album, CCCD by Sweet Exorcist. It was followed in the same year by Frequencies by LFO, which Beckett cited as a turning point for Warp. As of 1993, Frequencies had sold 80,000 copies, half in the US. The success saved Warp from bankruptcy. Warp used marketing techniques from rock, arranging mentions in the indie music magazine NME and encouraging their acts to tour. In 1991, Gordon left Warp following disagreements with Beckett and Mitchell.

=== Artificial Intelligence and intelligent dance music ===
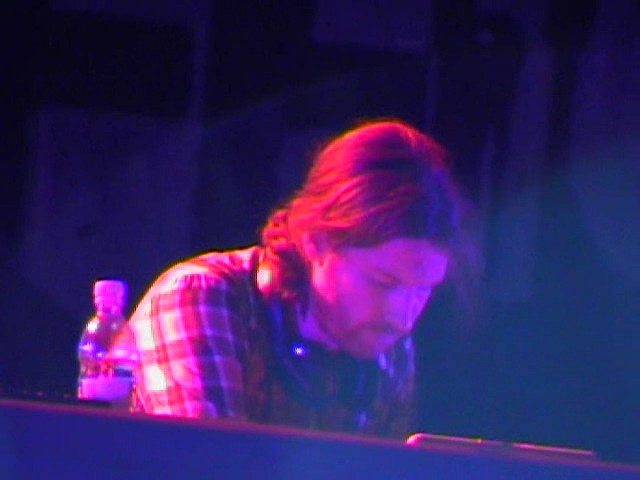
Richard D. James (Aphex Twin) has been described as the most important Warp artist.

In 1992, Warp released Artificial Intelligence, a compilation of tracks by artists such as Aphex Twin (under the name Dice Man), Autechre, B12 (Musicology), Plaid, the Black Dog (AO) and Richie Hawtin (Fuse). Unlike other electronic music of the time, it was intended to be listened to at home rather than in clubs. The Guardian wrote that it "announced techno as music for the mind as well as the feet".

Though Warp proposed the term "electronic listening music", Artificial Intelligence popularised a genre that instead became known as electronica or intelligent dance music (IDM). Though the IDM term was criticised as denigrating other forms of dance music, it endured. Artificial Intelligence is credited for introducing electronic music to rock listeners, particularly in the US, and helped launch the careers of Aphex Twin, Autechre and Hawtin.

Warp continued to prioritise albums, with releases by acts including Aphex Twin, Richard H. Kirk, Squarepusher, Seefeel, the Black Dog, Autechre, Sabres of Paradise and B12. In 1994, Warp released Artificial Intelligence II, accompanied by an hour-long music video on VHS and LaserDisc, Warp Motion, created by the Sheffield artist Phil Wolstenholme. Resident Advisor described the video as "a pioneering attempt to mix music and cutting-edge 3D computer animation".

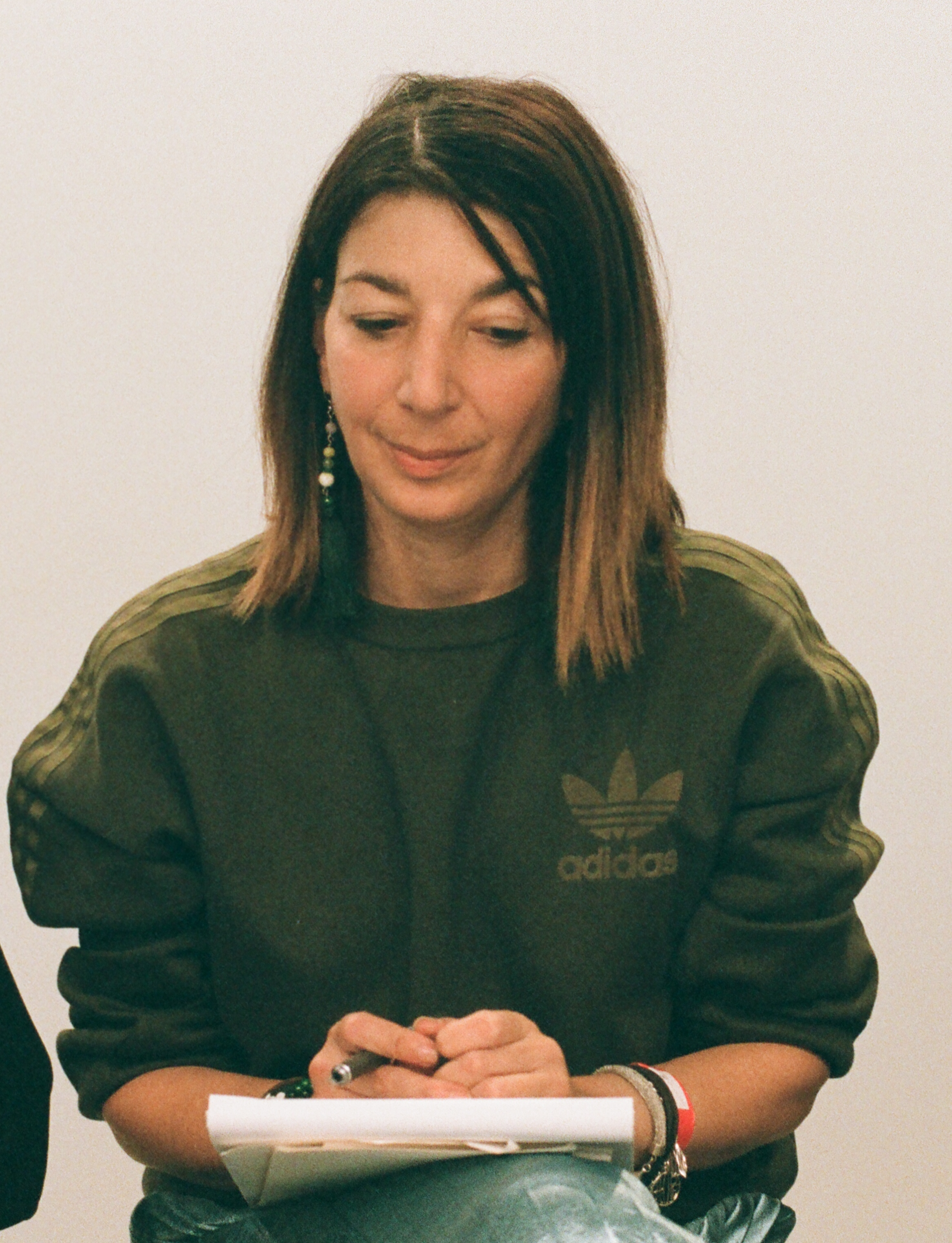
The Warp press officer, Chantal Passamonte (pictured in 2016), also released music as Mira Calix.

In 1996, Chantal Passamonte, who also worked as Warp's press officer, became the first female Warp artist with her debut EP, Ilanga, released under the name Mira Calix. Passamonte was critical of the gender imbalance, but said it came from "a lack of women putting themselves forward and a lack of opportunity" rather than hostility at Warp. In 1998, Warp signed the electronic duo Boards of Canada, whose debut album, Music Has the Right to Children, released that year, became a defining album in British music.

=== Online sales ===
Warp was an early adopter of using the internet for commerce. In 1996, it launched the online store Warpmart to sell physical products. The Warp Records shop closed in 1997 and was sold to the retailer Fopp. In 1999, Warp's tenth anniversary, it released the compilation album Influences, Classics & Remixes. In January 2000, Warp relocated to London to facilitate better access to the wider music industry. That year, Warp signed an album deal with the filmmaker Vincent Gallo. It also released a compilation of sketches from the surreal comedy radio series Blue Jam by Chris Morris, which Vice described as Warp's "boldest act of diversification".

In 2003, Billboard reported that Warp had annual revenues of US$10 million, with Warpmart contributing 10%. In 2004, Warp launched Bleep, one of the first download stores, and made its entire catalogue available to purchase digitally. Its prices were slightly higher than competing online stores such as iTunes, and its MP3s were available at a variable bitrate of 205 kbit/s, higher than the more common 160 kbit/s of the period. Unlike other labels at the time, Bleep sold files free of digital rights management restrictions. The Register wrote that this was a "positive statement" demonstrating faith in Warp's catalogue and customers.

Beckett estimated that Warpmart and Bleep generated 25% of Warp's turnover as of 2007. In January 2009, Warp merged Warpmart into Bleep, selling records from more than 300 independent labels, including Beggars Banquet, Domino and !K7. That year, Warp reported that Bleep had sold more than 1.8 million downloads.

=== Death of Mitchell and Warp Films ===
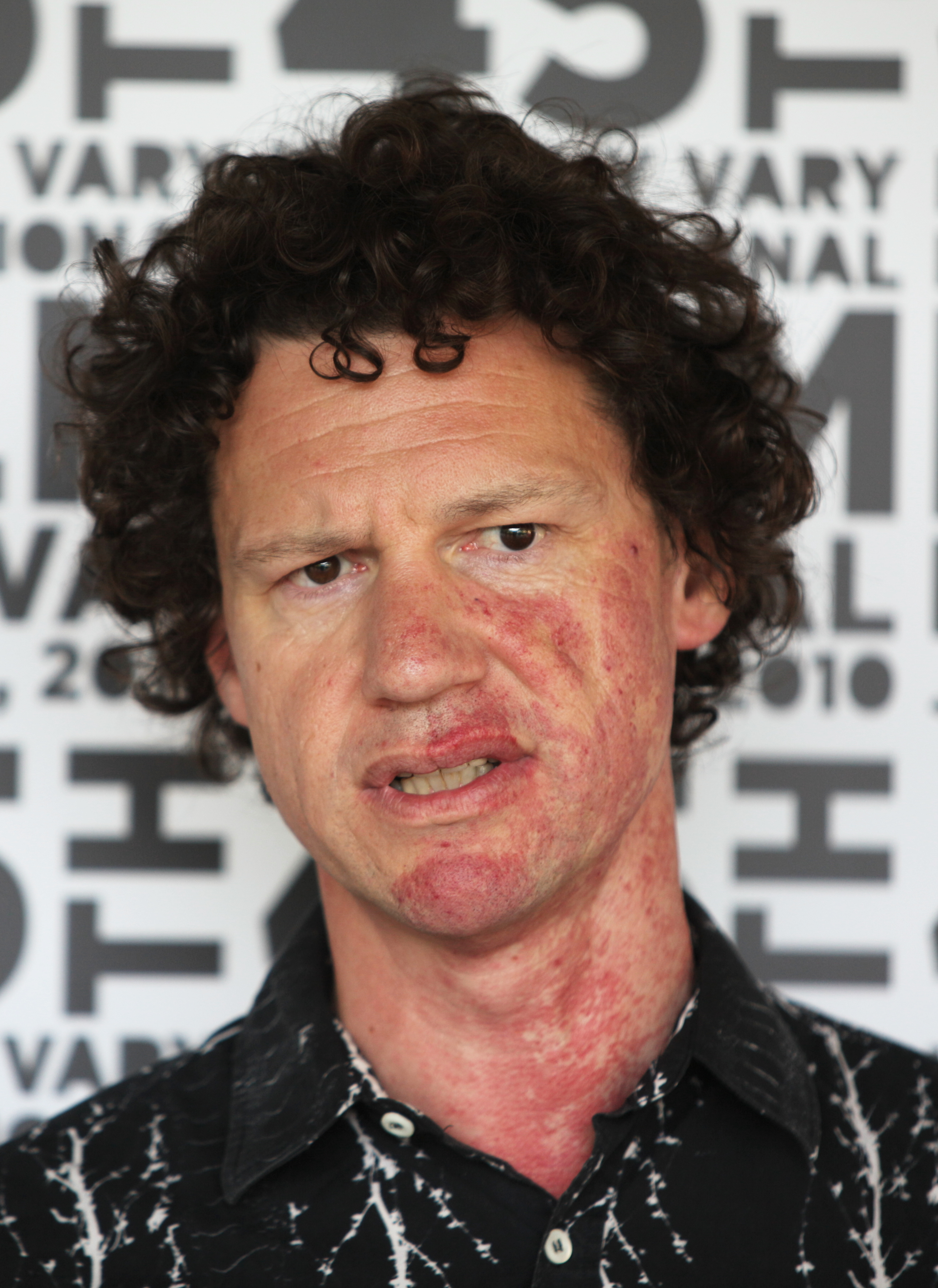
Chris Morris (pictured in 2010) directed the first Warp Films release, My Wrongs 8245–8249 & 117 (2002).

Mitchell died from cancer on 8 October 2001, at the age of 38, leaving Beckett as the head of Warp. Beckett likened him to a brother and said his death made him realise how important it was to "put love and creativity out into the world". Passamonte said: "Between them Rob and Steve were responsible for signing and managing the label's artists. Without being emotional about it, when Rob died that changed. Ultimately, the sound of Warp up until Rob's death was the sound of two people's music taste."

In 2001, Warp established a film production company, Warp Films. It initially produced and released short films by Chris Cunningham, who had created music videos for Warp artists such as Aphex Twin, and by Chris Morris. According to Beckett, Warp found that some music video directors they were working with, such as Cunningham, had similar personalities to the musicians, "pushing the boundaries" of their medium. Additionally, new technology was making it cheaper to create films. The first Warp Films release, Morris's My Wrongs 8245–8249 & 117, won the 2003 Bafta for best short film.

In 2004, Warp released its first feature film, Dead Man's Shoes, directed by Shane Meadows, which was nominated for a Bafta. Meadows's next film, This Is England (2007), won the Bafta for Best British Film. In 2022, The Independent described This Is England as Warp Films' "crowning glory to date: as visceral as any early Warp record, but with the bleeding humanity its best artists have found in their maturity". In 2009, The Independent wrote that Warp Films had "quickly become the UK's most consistent and challenging indie production company". In 2006, Warp launched Warp X to seek new talent in film, with funding by the UK Film Council and FilmFour.

=== Genre expansion ===
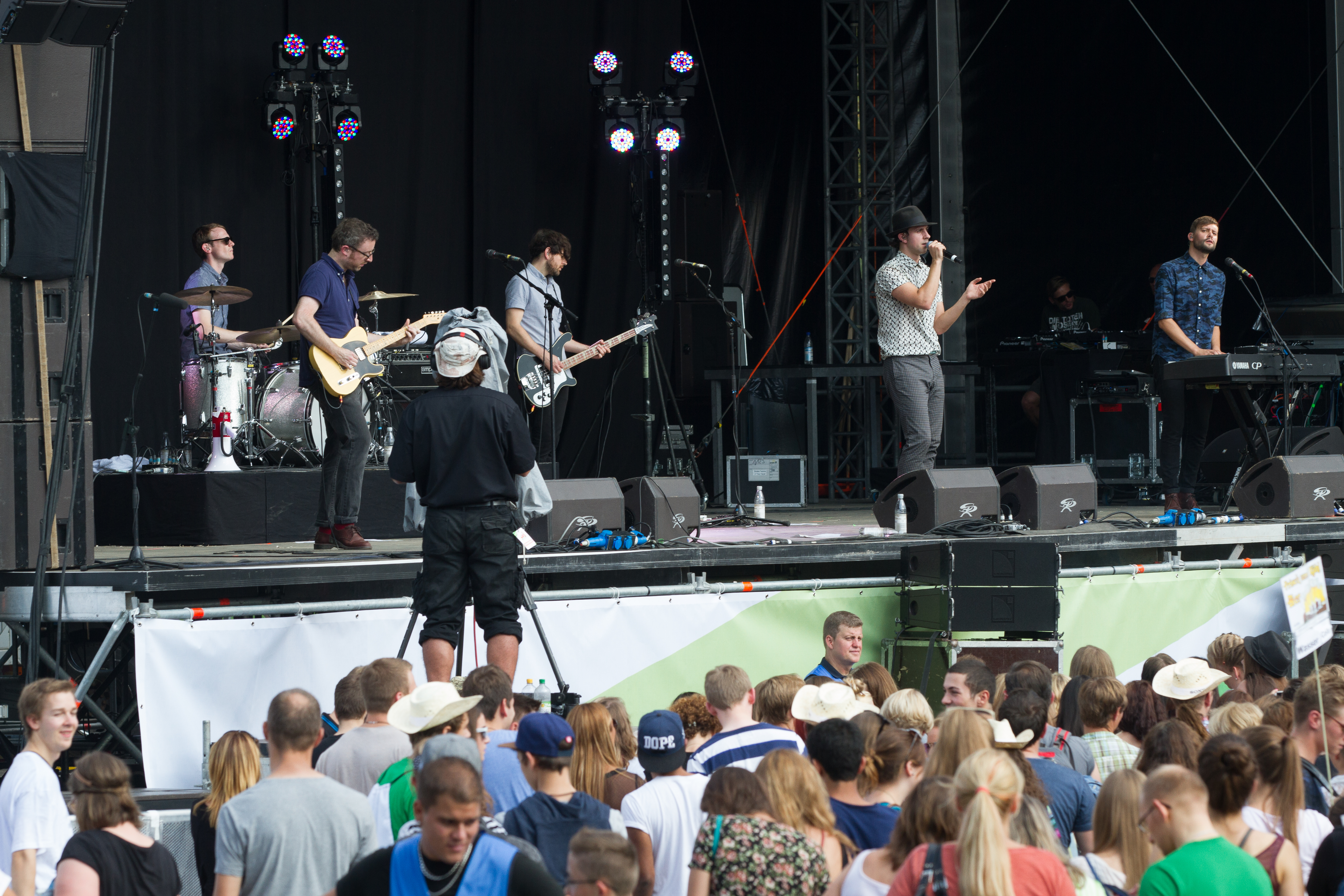
Maxïmo Park in 2006

In the 2000s, interest in electronic music declined following the resurgence of guitar bands. In response, Warp signed rock bands such as Maxïmo Park, !!!, Battles and Grizzly Bear; acts creating different kinds of electronic music, such as the Sabres of Paradise and Broadcast; and experimental hip-hop acts such as Prefuse 73, Antipop Consortium and Flying Lotus.

The diversification drew criticism from some fans. Beckett said the acts' experimental nature and influences fit the ethos of Warp and their roster, and noted that the Sheffield Warp shop had stocked indie music. The !!! member Nic Offer said guitar bands were providing "new and cutting edge" music at the time and were true to Warp's "experimental ethos". In 2009, Pitchfork said Warp had "wisely invited pop-structured acts that carried the spirit and sensibility of electronic music into its fold". The Independent wrote that the Maxïmo Park singer, Paul Smith, "fitted the label snugly, even if the guitars did not", while Grizzly Bear "with their careful sculpting of sound and veiled emotions [...] could be a warmer, softer Autechre".

In 2001, Warp funded an imprint, Lex Records, created by the Warp employee Tom Brown. It focused on hip-hop, releasing records by Sage Francis, Boom Bip and Danger Mouse. Warp specified that Lex could not release albums, sign long-term deals, or release music by acts Warp was considering signing. Through Lex, Warp funded the unsuccessful campaign to release The Grey Album (2004) by Danger Mouse, a mashup of the Beatles' White Album and Jay-Z's The Black Album that was blocked due to copyright problems. When Warp decided to close Lex Records, Brown bought it in 2004.

In April 2003, Warp's 10th anniversary, the comedian Adam Buxton hosted a retrospective show at the BFI Southbank cinema in London. From the mid-2000s, Warp expanded its roster to include more experimental work, including avant-garde film soundtracks, neoclassical music and more "academic" ambient music. Brian Eno, a pioneer of ambient music, signed to Warp in 2010.

In 2009, for its 20th anniversary, Warp held a party in an old steelworks in Sheffield, along with events in Paris, New York City and Tokyo. It also released the Warp20 box set, comprising tracks chosen by listeners and Beckett, cover versions, remixes, unreleased tracks and locked grooves. In 2017, Beckett received the Pioneer Award at the AIM Independent Music Awards. As of that year, according to Beckett, Warp employed 60 people in six offices around the world. In 2019, its 30th anniversary, Warp released WXAXRXP Sessions, a box set compiling radio sessions by Warp artists.

== Legacy ==
Pitchfork said music released by Warp typically emphasises "shifts and melodies and complex rhythm structures over the more subtle builds and crescendos of repetitive dance", using "syncopated rhythms, wit and whimsy, and the blending [of] the abstract and the melodic". Warp is associated with the "cerebral" electronic music of acts such as Aphex Twin, Autechre and Boards of Canada. However, Resident Advisor wrote that it had shifted to encompass "all manner of experimental, progressive and left-of-centre sounds from across the musical spectrum". In 2009, Pitchfork wrote that Warp was a trusted brand that had succeeded by breaking with conventions of electronic music, "embracing artists with wit and charisma over the sometimes monochromatic communalism favoured by techno's more faceless producers". Vice wrote in 2013 that "while not all its artists have enjoyed commercial success, there are precious few follies or embarrassments in its legacy".

DMY wrote that the fact that Warp had thrived while remaining independent, even when many major labels had disappeared, made them a role model for independent labels. Beckett said that, unlike other labels, Warp saw itself "at the service of the artist". In 2002, Mark Blacklock of The Telegraph wrote that Warp was "a truly progressive organisation ... Where other labels claim to be artist-orientated, Warp really is." He wrote that Warp allowing in-demand acts such as Aphex Twin and Squarepusher to avoid publicity boosted their underground credibility and attracted unusual artists such as the satirist Chris Morris. The Independent described Aphex Twin as Warp's most important artist, creating its "creative commercial core", as the Smiths had done for Rough Trade and Arctic Monkeys later did for Domino. Though Aphex Twin also released work through Rephlex Records, Warp released his most successful releases, Richard D. James Album (1996) and the singles "Come to Daddy" (1997) and "Windowlicker" (1999).

In 2007, The Independent described Warp as one of the most pioneering independent labels in history, and in 2009 The Guardian described it as one of the UK's greatest independent labels. Resident Advisor wrote in 2019 that Warp was "one of the most influential and respected institutions in electronic music" and had "championed some of the most groundbreaking artists of its generation". It wrote that its "outsider ethos" was rooted in Beckett and Mitchell's roots in punk, the English north-south divide and the radical politics of 1980s Sheffield. The journalist Richard King described Warp as "the most creatively successful independent label" of the 1990s, ahead of the "perky ordinariness" of Britpop.

Warp Records found audiences beyond listeners of dance music and influenced pop and rock music. Artists such as Aphex Twin and Autechre influenced Radiohead's move into electronic music with their 2000 album Kid A. The singer, Thom Yorke, purchased copies of the entire Warp back catalogue.
